= History of rail transport in Cameroon =

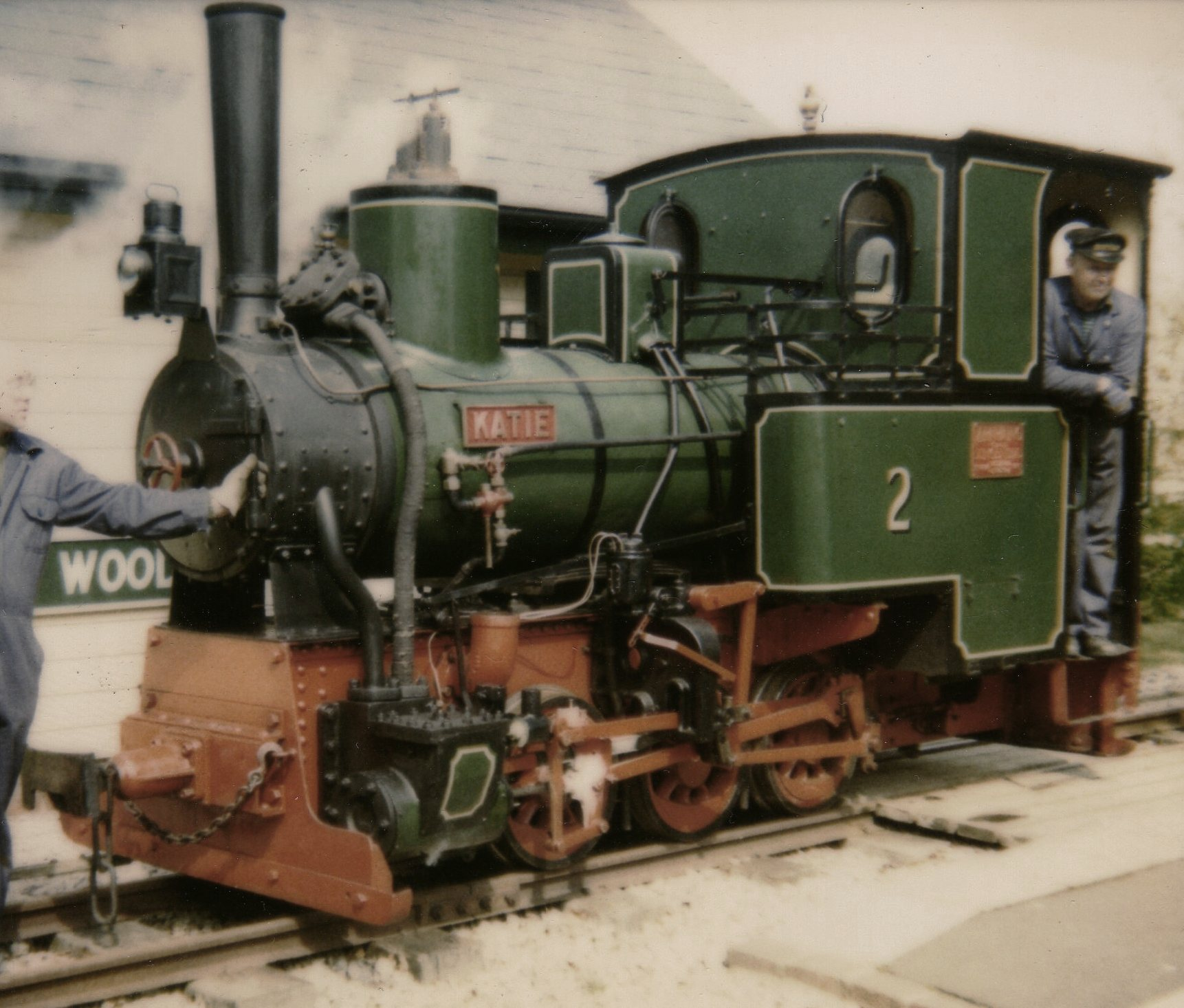
Preserved Arne Jung locomotive, previously used on sugar plantations in Cameroon

The history of rail transport in Cameroon began at around the turn of the twentieth century.

== Colonial period ==
=== German colonial period ===
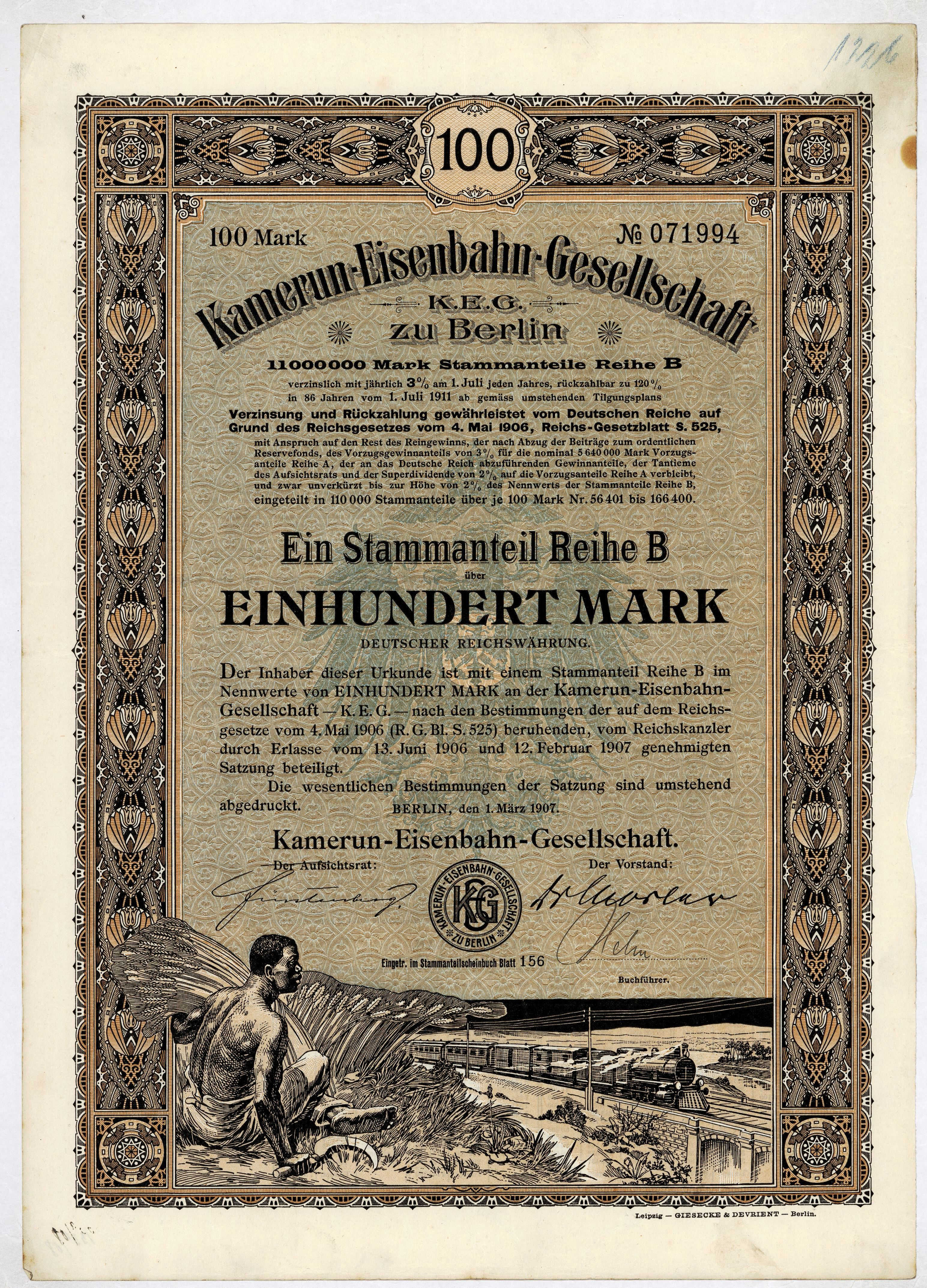
Share of the Kamerun-Eisenbahn-Gesellschaft, issued 1 March 1907

The topography of Cameroon was unfavourable for railway construction: mountains and a dense forest belt in the hinterland of the largest port, Douala, long prevented the entry of Cameroon into the railway era.

The first railway to go into operation in Cameroon was a 600 mm (1 ft 11 5/8 in) narrow gauge Feldbahn line, which was constructed by the private West African Planting Society Victoria (German: Westafrikanische Pflanzungsgesellschaft Victoria) (WAPV). Initially, this railway ran from Zwingenberger Hof in Soppo, near Buea, the colonial capital of German Kamerun from 1901 to 1919, to the small port of Victoria, now known as Limbe, and also offered passenger services. It was later expanded.

A similar 600 mm gauge railway was built by the Cameroon Development Corporation (CDC), more eastern of the (WAPV) and operational until the 1970s.

The second railway to be built in Cameroon was the 160-kilometre-long (99 mi) Douala–Nkongsamba railway, also known as the Northern Railway (Nordbahn), was built between 1906 and 1911 from Bonabéri (opposite Douala on the Wouri estuary) to Nkongsamba. The Cameroon Railway Corporation (German: Kamerun-Eisenbahn-Gesellschaft) was created for this purpose in 1906. The third railway was the Douala–Ngaoundere railway, also known as the Central Railway (Mittellandbahn). These two lines were built in 1,000 mm (3 ft 3 3/8 in) metre gauge and set the standards for future railway construction in Cameroon.

Construction of the third railway, known as the Central Railway, was carried by a German private company in the period 1910-1914 from the port of Douala to Eséka

=== French and British mandate ===
After the Armistice in 1918, the majority of Cameroon was granted to France as a League of Nations mandate, with the rest being granted to the United Kingdom.

The League of Nations "trusteeship" did not animate the French colonial powers to make greater investment in Cameroon's railways. Initially, they did no more than restore the lines constructed under German rule to operating condition. The Northern Railway and the Central Railway were merged as the Chemins de fer de Cameroun (CFC), but continued to operate as two separate networks.

Under the French mandate, the construction of the Central Railway was continued and by 1927 reached Yaoundé. The seat of the colonial administration was then moved there. The closure of the gap to Mbalmayo was first achieved by a 600 mm (1 ft 11 5/8 in) railway from Otélé, with Feldbahn motive power and rolling stock. Only in 1933 was the extension converted to metre gauge.

The changeover to diesel operation was accelerated from 1950, because all coal had to be imported from South Africa and this led repeatedly to irregularities in the course of delivery. In 1955, a structural link was made between the Central Railway and the Northern Railway, via a 12-kilometre-long (7.5 mi) section of line and a 1,850-metre-long (6,070 ft) bridge over the Wouri River.

== Republic of Cameroon ==
Independent from 1960, the Republic of Cameroon devoted its initial rail transport efforts to the construction of a 29-kilometre-long (18 mi) branch from the Northern Railway to Kumba. This line went into operation in 1969.

The new Republic's biggest project was a 622 km (386 mi) extension of the Central Railway from Yaoundé to Ngaoundéré, known as the transcamerounais or Trans-Cameroon Railway. Funds for the Yaoundé-Belabo segment amounting 37.85 million dollars was provided by the European Common Market, France and USAID. Construction started in late 1964 and went into operation in 1974, and the maximum extent reached by the rail network was 1,120 km (700 mi).

In the 1970s, the Cameroon Development Corporation (CDC) commissioned a new railway similar to, and immediately to the east of, Cameroon's original WAPV network. Reports as to its gauge vary between 600 mm (1 ft 11 5/8 in) and 610 mm (2 ft). A lower level section of the Central Railway was partially rerouted between 1975 and 1983. However, the line was closed beyond Nkongsamba, and some of the tracks were removed.

The global privatisation wave reached Cameroon's railway network in 1996. A 30-year (20 year?) concession for the operation of the network was awarded on 19 January 1999 to Camrail, a subsidiary of Groupe Bolloré. Camrail, also known as Cameroon Railways, carries passengers as well as freight.

In 2016 the country suffered the worst rail accident in its history after an overloaded train derailed near the town of Eséka, killing at least 70 people.

In 2020 work started to upgrade Camrail for heavier bauxite traffic from Minim, Martap and Birsok.

In 2022 work started by Portuguese company Mota-Engil of an iron ore railway from Mbalam and Nabeba to the new deep water port at Kribi. A branch from the main line at Edéa, to Kribi was also proposed.

== See also ==
- History of rail transport
- History of Cameroon
- Rail transport in Cameroon
- Railway stations in Cameroon
