= Grand Batanga =

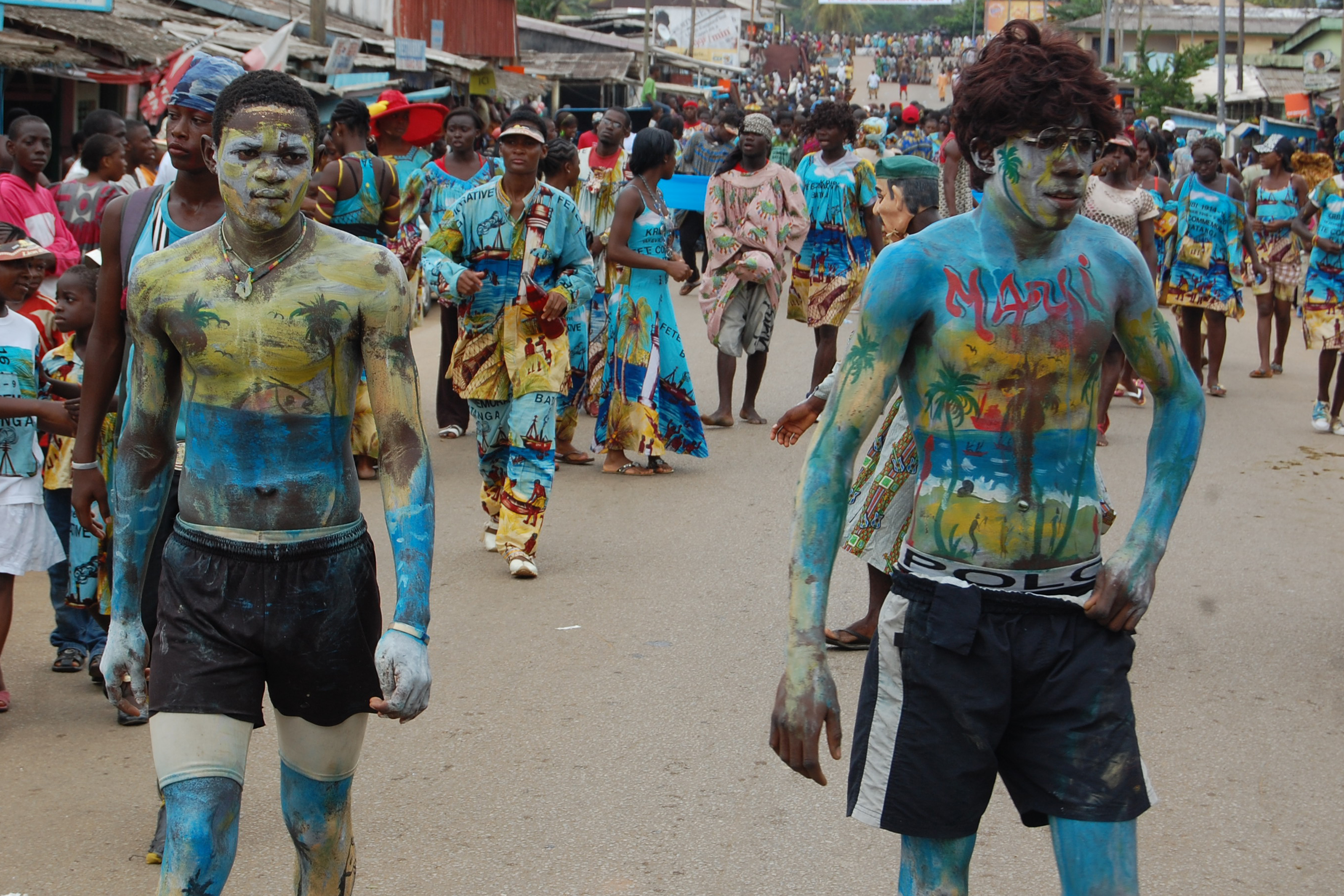
- Batanga festival

- Location in Cameroon
- Coordinates: 2°51′N 9°52′E
- Country: Cameroon
- Province: South Province
- Elevation: 3.3 ft (1 m)

Grand Batanga is a coastal village in the South Province of Cameroon. It lies about halfway between the port of Kribi and the Guinea border to the south.

== Iron Ore ==
Grand Batanga is the possible site of a deep water port for the haulage of iron ore from the Mbalam region about 450 km to the east. As there is no natural harbour in the vicinity, a pier several kilometres long will be needed to access deep water of about 20 metres.

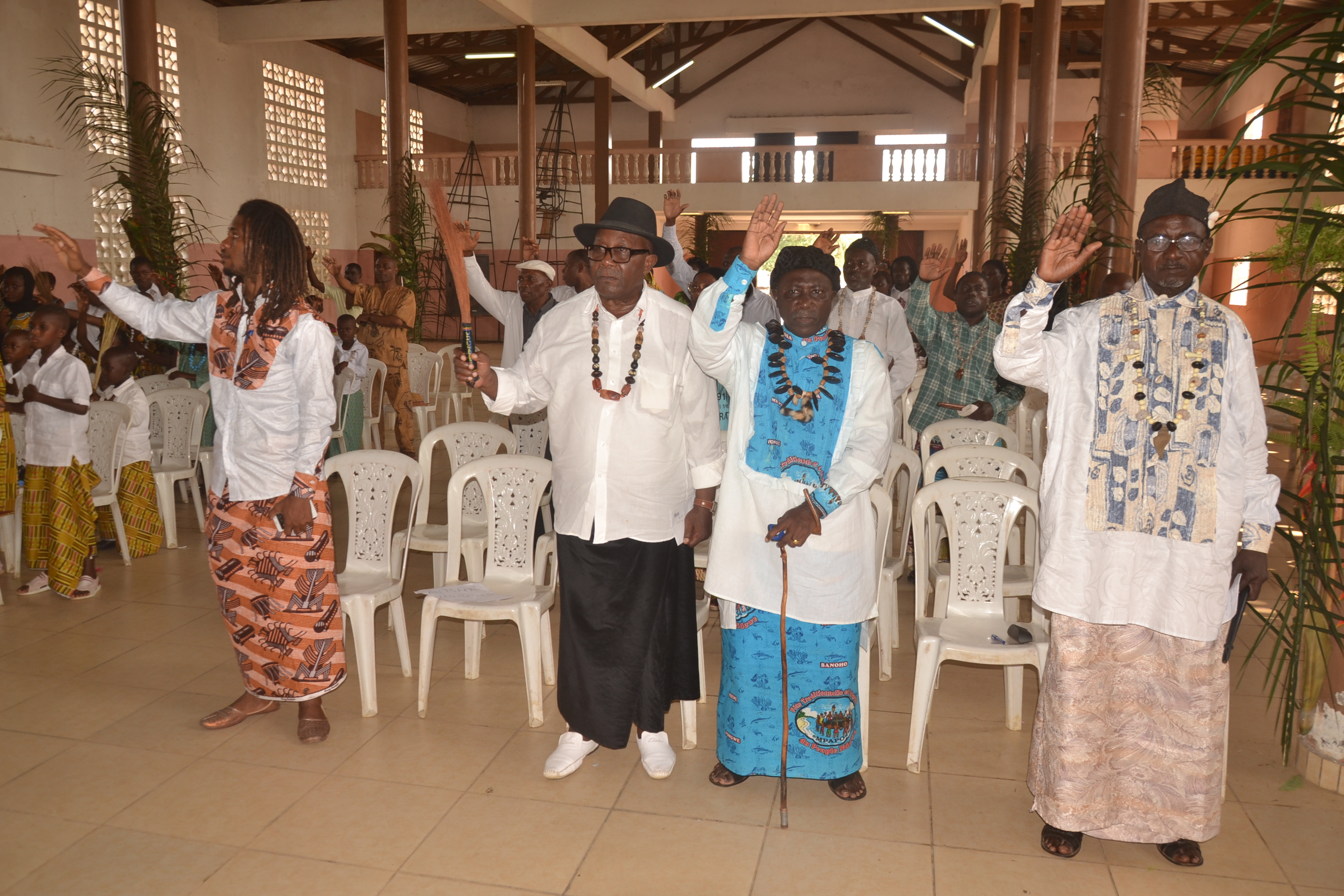
Men in traditional dress

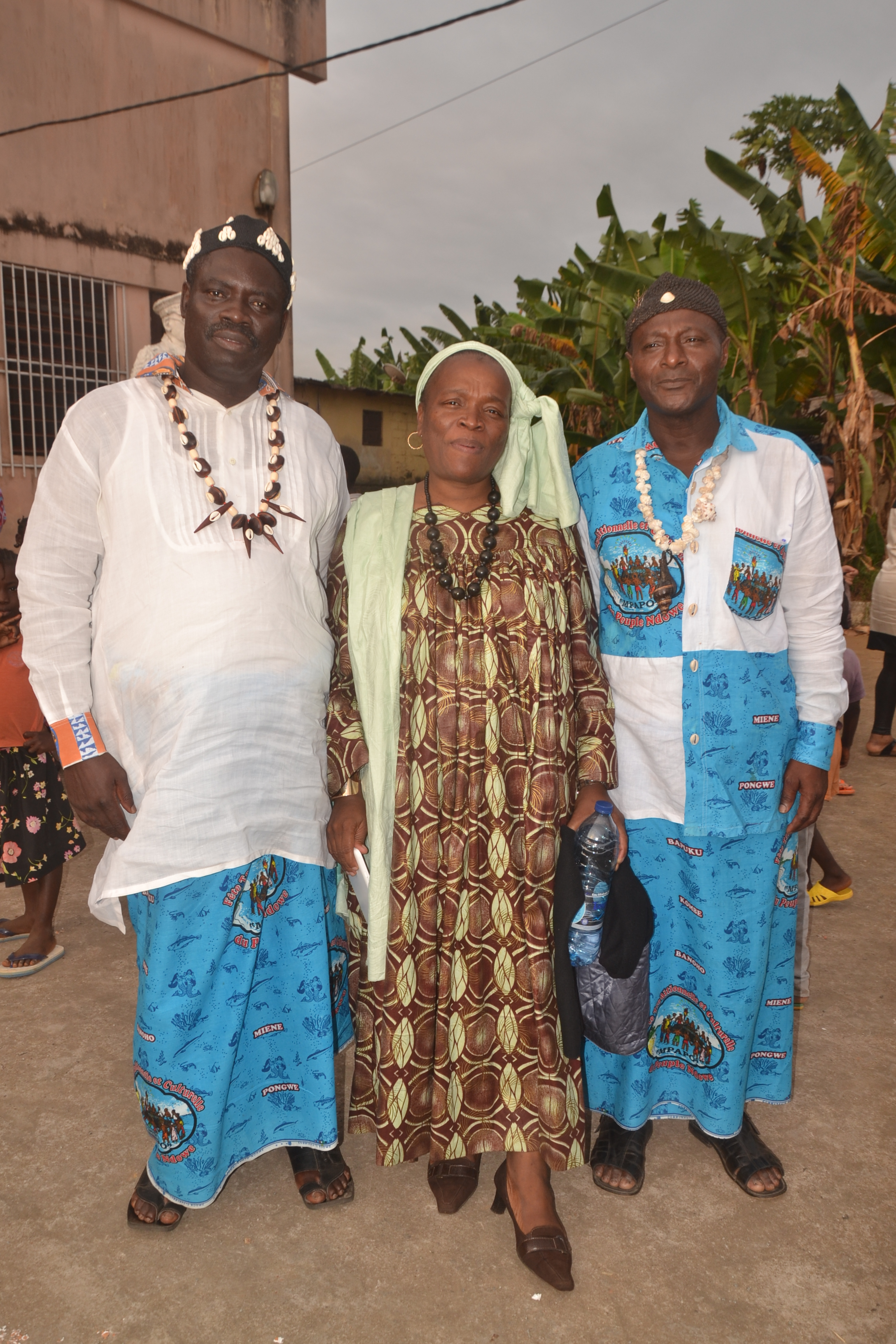
Men and woman in traditional dress

== Quantm software ==
The route of the railway is being designed using Quantm software which analyzes millions of alternative before presenting the operator a handful of the most promising choices. The software determines the quantities of cut and fill which tend to be one of the most important cost factors.

Maps of the Quantm choices can be seen in the Annual General Meeting Presentation.

The most preferred route shows a generally level route from Mbalam to Grand Batanga with one 100 km stretch of falling gradients. The gradients of such a route favours loaded trains.

Batanga Festival

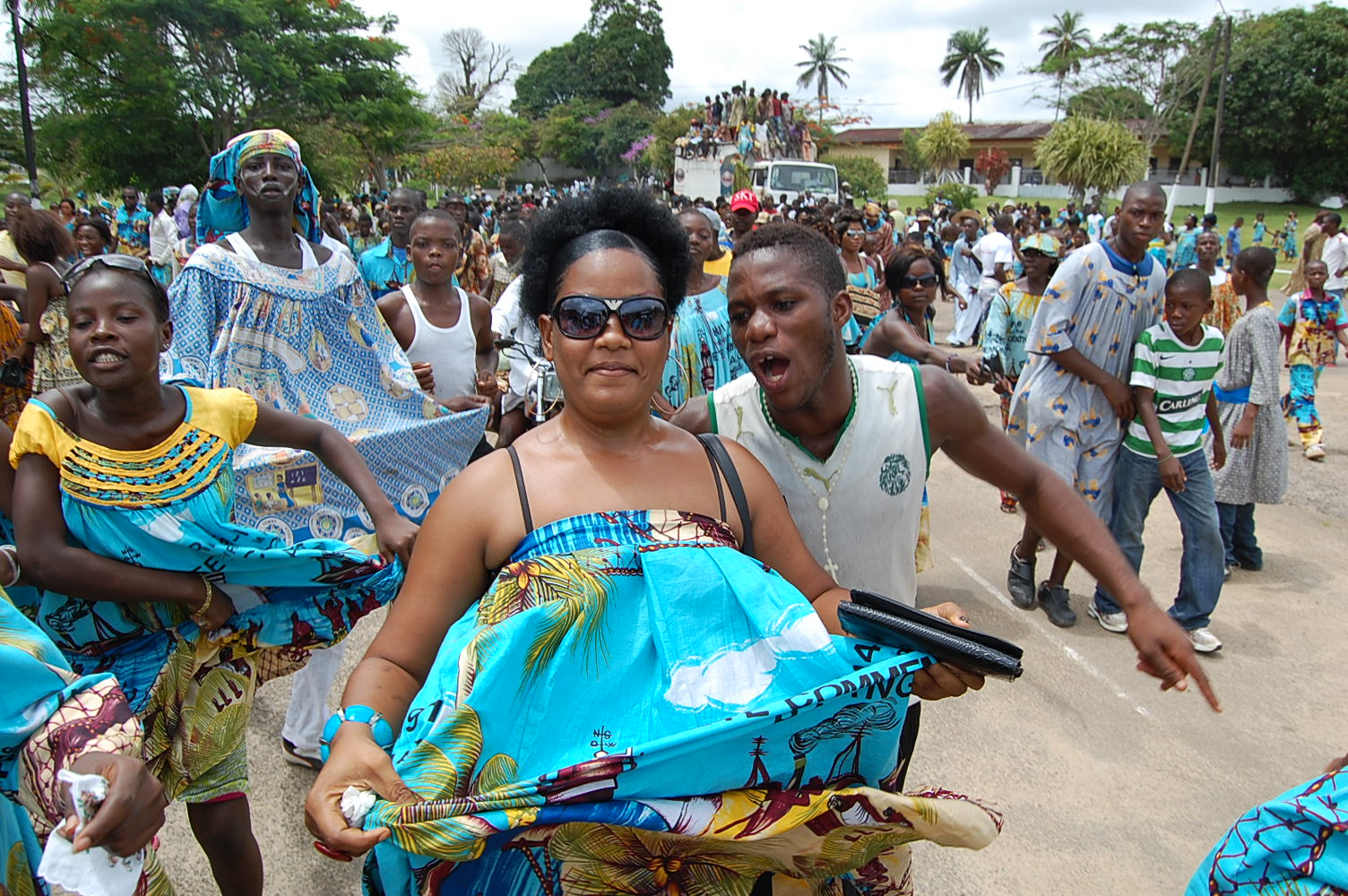

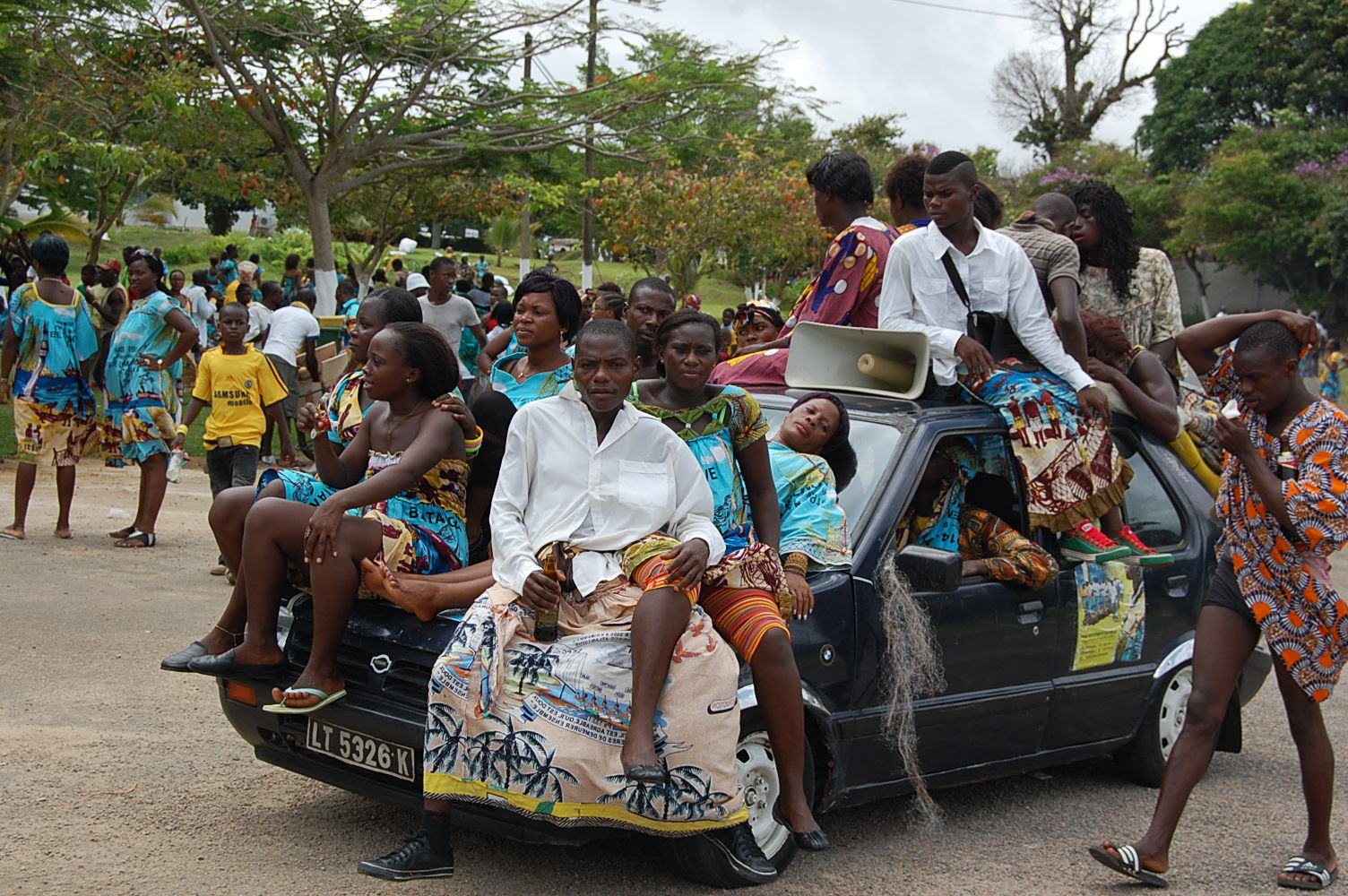

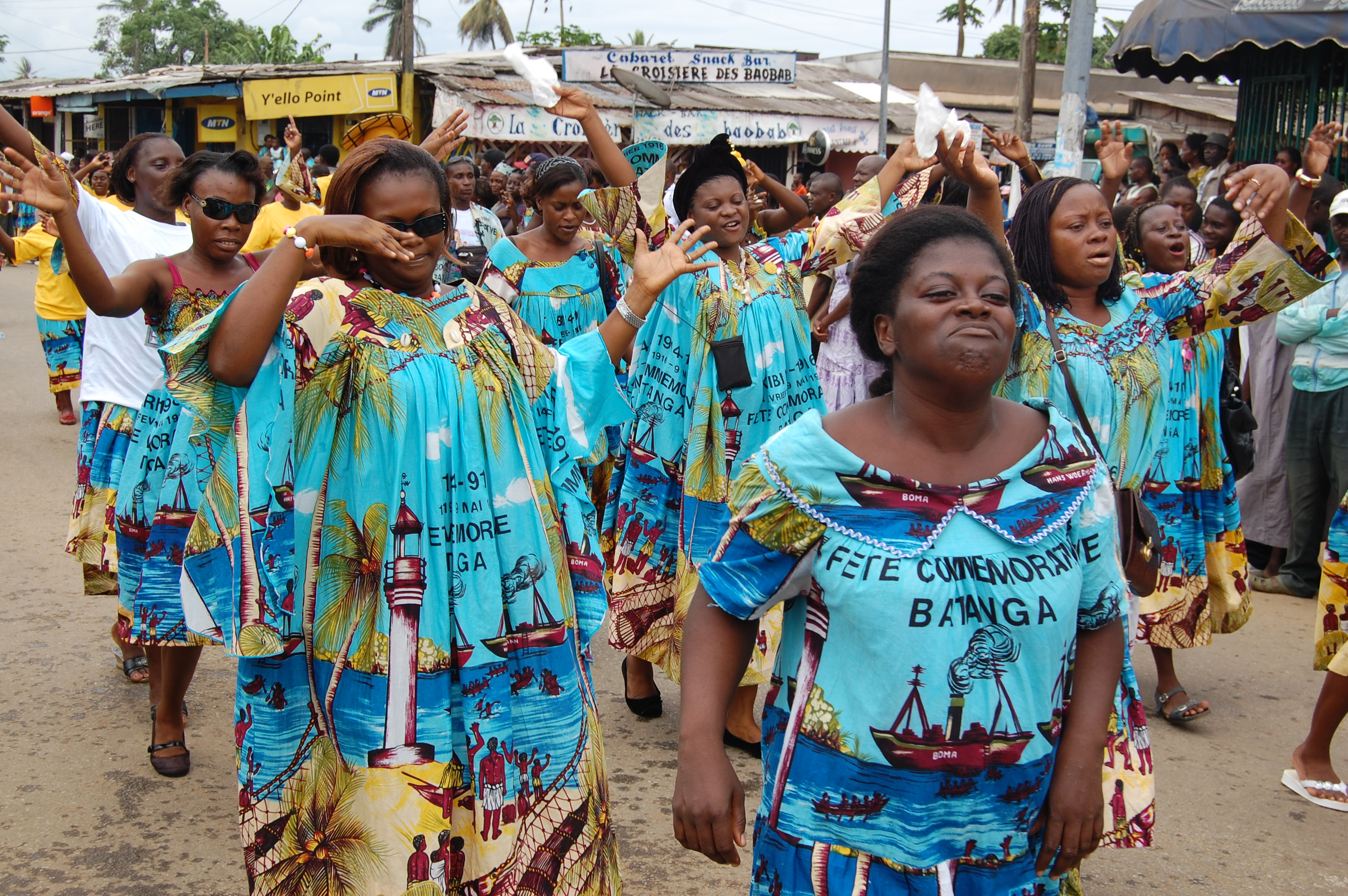

== See also ==
- Transport in Cameroon
- Railway stations in Cameroon
- Communes of Cameroon
