= Ngaoundéré Central Station =

Railway station in Ngaoundéré, Cameroon

Ngaoundéré Central Station Gare centrale de Ngaoundéré
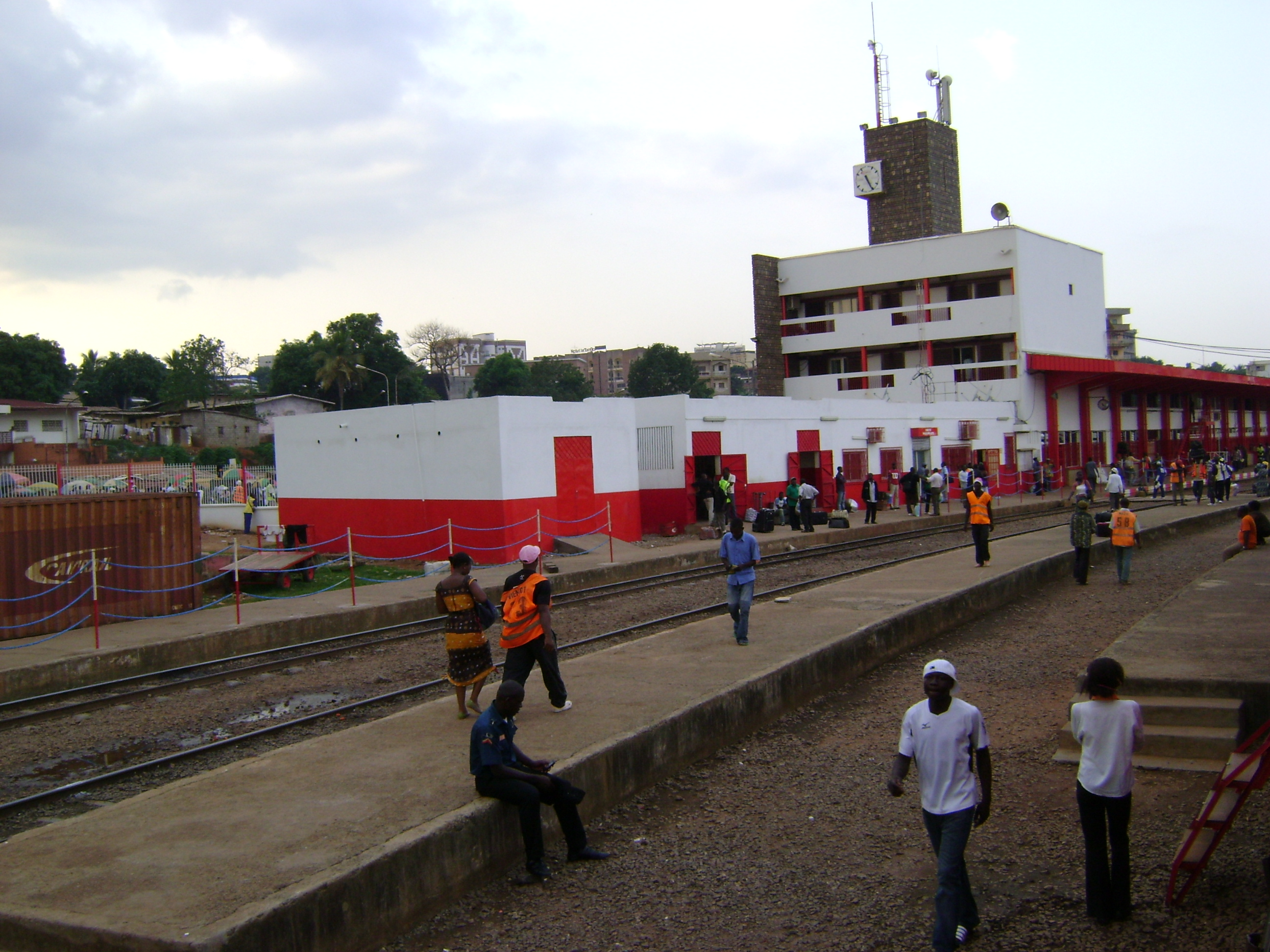
- The station in 2010

General information
- Coordinates: 7.3385°N 13.5898°E
- Operator: Camrail
- Line: Yaoundé-Bélabo-Ngaoundéré line

History
- Opened: December 10, 1974

Services
Preceding station	Camrail	Following station
Bélabo towards Yaoundé	Yaoundé–Ngaoundéré	Terminus
Location

The Ngaoundéré Central Station (Gare centrale de Ngaoundéré in French) is the main railway station in Ngaoundéré, Cameroon. It is located on the Yaoundé-Bélabo-Ngaoundéré line of the Camrail network.

The station was opened on December 10, 1974. It was extensively renovated in 2012, at a cost of around two billion CFA francs. This renovation added 22 benches, 16 lamps, toilet blocks, commercial buildings, the installation of tiles and the construction of offices for the Commissioner of Railways.

The station serves as a discharge point for fresh foods which are then loaded into trucks for transport to points in the north of the country and in Chad. While a true dry port, the railway station in Ngaoundere lacks the appropriate infrastructure for the storage of fresh food. The food items are left in the open air, close to other types of goods, regardless of the type.

== See also ==
- Rail transport in Cameroon
- Railway stations in Cameroon
- Transport in Cameroon
