= African Union of Railways =

Rail transport industry body

The African Union of Railways is an organisation under the auspices of the new African Union dealing with railways. It is similar to the International Union of Railways (UIC).

== Overview ==
Africa's railways are disjointed and disconnected. The AUR hopes to rectify things. By 2012 a number of railway projects had been proposed to rectify this, some of which would make connections between international railway systems. This interconnectivity would require the development of more standardised systems.

=== Standards ===
==== Gauge ====
The AUR sees that conversion to a common gauge is too difficult and expensive due to the gauge muddle, but based on reports from the World Bank, does see the following gauges as preferred in the following regions:

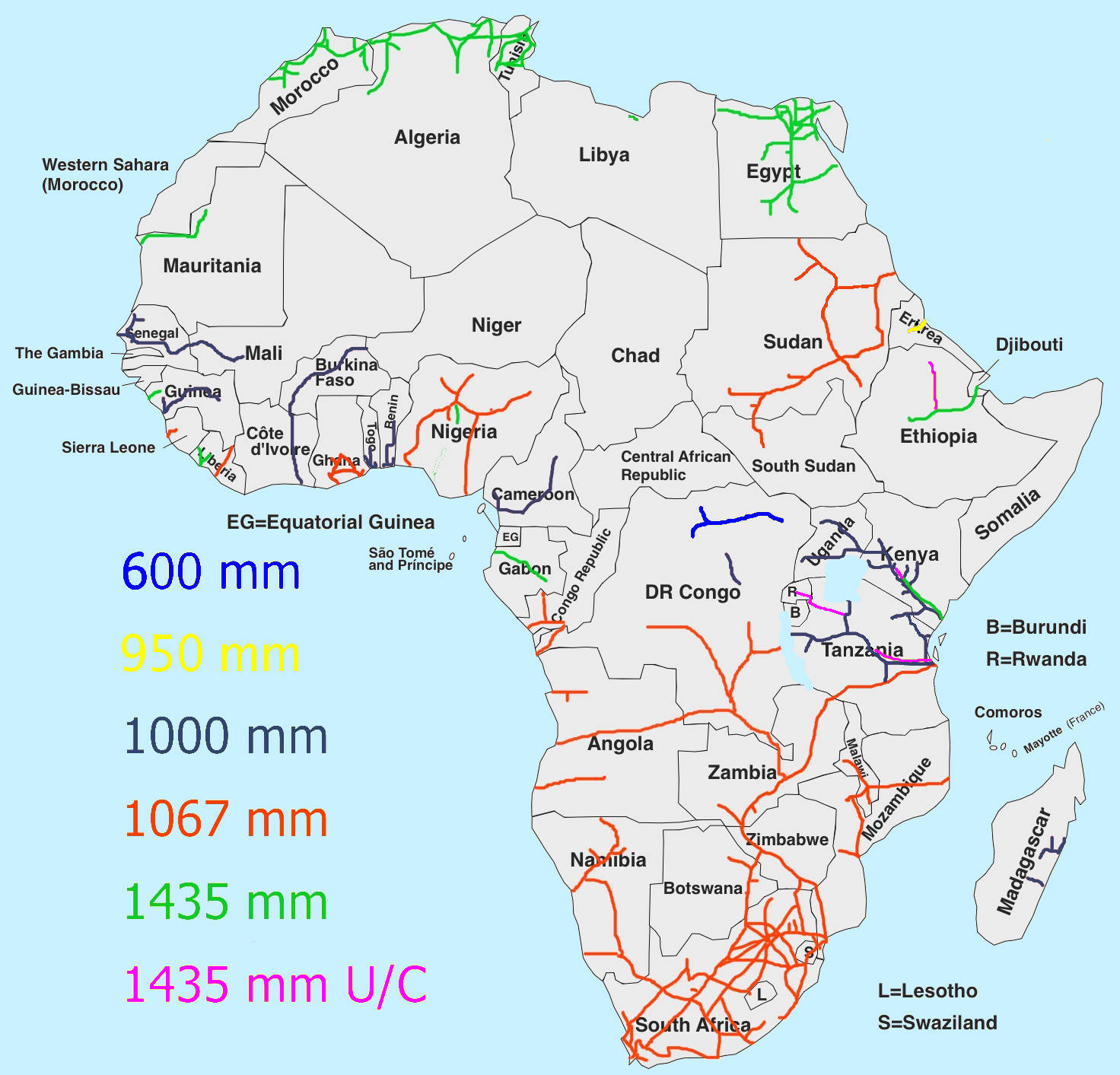
Schematic map of African railways by gauge

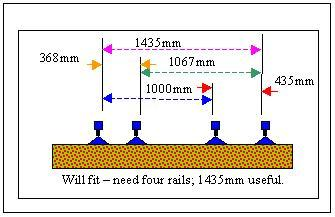
1000 mm and 1067 mm gauges can be combined as a 4 rail dual gauge with bonus 1435 mm gauge

- North – 1,435 mm (4 ft 8 1/2 in)
- South – 1,067 mm (3 ft 6 in) mostly connected and quite strong.
- East – 1,067 mm (3 ft 6 in) (but Tanzania, Kenya, Uganda and isolated Ethiopia are 1,000 mm (3 ft 3 3/8 in) ).
- West – 1,000 mm (3 ft 3 3/8 in) (but Sierra Leone and Nigeria 1,067 mm (3 ft 6 in) are isolated).
- Other
  - 610 mm (2 ft) South Africa TG (ToyG)
  - 950 mm (3 ft 1 3/8 in) Eritrea NG
  - 1,055 mm (3 ft 5 1/2 in) Algeria NG – isolated systems
- Scattered mining railways – 1,435 mm (4 ft 8 1/2 in) plus Gabon.

Several railways such as Senegal, Guinea and Tanzania have talked about conversion to standard gauge, though it remains to be seen if talk develops into action. Guinea built one new branch as standard gauge even though metre gauge is needed to take the ore to the port. Nigeria has built one short branch with dual gauge sleepers, and a network aiming to serve the port of Warri is also standard gauge. An extension from Tanzania into Rwanda is proposed as standard gauge, though it starts at a station that is already an container transhipment dry port. Mining railways that carry very large tonnages (> 10,000 metric tonnes per year) are generally standard gauge.

However, conspicuous by their absence, is the possibility of dual gauge, containerisation, variable gauge axles, bogie exchange, piggy back operation and even triple gauge.

However the African Union now supports the 50-year plan to build the African Integrated High Speed Railway Network.

Triple gauge supports 1,000 mm (3 ft 3 3/8 in), 1,067 mm (3 ft 6 in) and 1,435 mm (4 ft 8 1/2 in). The wide separation or the outer pairs of rails (435 mm and 368 mm) provides space for railclips and suits turnout construction.

=== Timeline ===
==== 2014 ====
Construction of standard gauge lines is being progressed in

- Ethiopia and Eritrea
- Kenya
- Tanzania
- Nigeria
- Ghana
- Cameroon – Kribi–Mbalam (2023 now under construction)

=== Break of gauge ===
Because the mainlines of different countries of different gauges rarely meet, except Kidatu, break of gauge is paradoxically not a problem at the moment.

==== Couplings ====
Couplings in use include:

- European style buffers and chain couplers, the spacing and height of the buffers varying with the gauge;
- Norwegian chopper couplings of various kinds, which are low in strength and obsolete.
- AAR coupler – an automatic type used throughout the contiguous Southern African network.
- SA3 coupler – an automatic type used in the former Soviet Union but rare in Africa.
- Digital automatic coupling – proposal ; connects air brakes and controls
- More than one of the above, such as buffers and AAR coupler such as India
- There are a few other uncommon and obsolete types, such as those used in Benin.

The American AAR coupler is the most widely used of the modern types, and is usable with the heaviest trains of regularly 32,000 t (31,500 long tons; 35,300 short tons).

Whatever the advantages of the modern SA3 coupler, it is not as widely used as the AAR and is in the minority. The SA3 coupler has been used in a train of 43,400 t (42,700 long tons; 47,800 short tons), thus either matching or surpassing the strength of the AAR coupler.

Match wagons can overcome incompatibilities at the price of considerable extra deadweight. Similarly with deadweight of coupling adapters.

The type of coupling is less important when trains travel in fixed block loads.

Modern wagons are usually built with draw-gear designed for easy conversion to some kind of centre coupling such as the AAR or SA3.

==== Brakes ====
Westinghouse air brakes and vacuum brakes (or no continuous brakes at all) are usually fitted. Dual brakes or piped only can overcome incompatibilities. Vacuum brakes are considered to be obsolete. Electronically controlled pneumatic brakes (ECP) are starting to be fitted on faster, heavy-duty trains for higher performance, and the two ECP systems are compatible. Air brakes are to be preferred to vacuum brakes because of their greater power.

==== Electrification ====
Most railways in Africa are diesel-operated, but electrification where it exists it mostly conforms to the modern standard of 25 kV AC, with some obsolete systems using the older 3 kV DC. Trams in cities are usually low voltage such as 750 VDC. Dual and multi voltage locomotives and electric multiple units (EMUs) are proven technology. Africa has great hydro-electric potential to run electric trains with, though this would not happen overnight.

==== Loading gauge ====
Loading gauges vary considerably, and through trains would be forced to use the most restrictive loading gauge along its route. The structure gauge of tunnels and bridges needs to be about 1 m (3.28 ft) taller to allow for piggy back operation of trains of one gauge on the wagons of another gauge.

The loading gauge width for new standard gauge railways in Ethiopia and Kenya is following the 3,400 millimetres (11 ft 2 in) standard, initially used by Mantetsu and Sentetsu, which has become the national standard in China and both Koreas, then followed by Japanese Shinkansen. May also be followed by Algeria, Cameroon, Guinea, Ghana, Niger, Nigeria, Tanzania, Uganda

Platform and carriage floor heights should be standardised, as well as the gap between platform and carriage.

==== Axle loads ====
Axle loads vary considerably, depending on the strength of the track, especially the weight of the rails which are generally too light for modern traffic. A reasonable minimum rail weight is 40 kg/m (80.64 lb/yd), though 50 kg/m (100.80 lb/yd) or 60 kg/m (120.95 lb/yd) would be preferred for heavy duty use.

The Kribi–Mbalam iron ore railway has an axleload of 37.5T.

==== Train lengths and crossing loop lengths ====
Crossing loops should be as long as the longest likely train, considered globally. Some UIC standards are 750 and 1,500 m (2,461 and 4,921 ft). Extra length of the loop enables the rear of the train to clear the main line at more than line speed thus saving time.

Because of dangers imposed by wild animals such as lions, manual control of loops turnouts is not necessarily a good idea, and some degree of automation of these turnouts, and fencing, is desirable.

==== Minimum radius ====
Limits speeds, although speeds are less important on minor branch lines. Minimum radius also affects heaviest trains, due to tendency to pull wagons off the rails and derail them.

==== Language ====
Confusion and even accidents can occur if more than one language (or accent) is used to operate a railway. A simplified language such as seaspeak would be useful to reduce such problems.

- Pécrot rail crash with confusion of Dutch and French speakers.
- Complicated phrases can be simplified and made succinct by using say telegraphic codes.
  - Great Western Railway telegraphic codes
  - Australian railway telegraphic codes
  - Railway block code uses bells.
  - Commercial code
- Words can be spelled out over noisy lines using say the NATO phonetic alphabet.
- Names of stations should be distinguishable from one another. Similarly the Post Office doesn't like towns spoken or written alike.
  - Thus the village of Perth in New South Wales was getting mail intended for Perth, Scotland and Perth, Western Australia, so it was renamed Perthville.
  - Thus Makutopora and Makutupora are two distinct localities.

=== Namibia ===
As of 2007, Namibian railways built nearly 300 km (190 mi) of a line with Angola. Namibia has been using Tubular Modular Track. Tubular Modular Track maintains its track resilience even in harshest sandy desert conditions. Transnet Freight Rail in South Africa uses Tubular Modular Track in the main Ermelo yard on its 70 million tonnes per annum heavy haul coal export line. The continuous support provided by Tubular Modular Track increases rails and turnout life by a factor of two and weld life by a factor of ten (compared to conventional and slabtrack offering discrete support for rails). The Passenger Rail Agency of South Africa (PRASA) uses Tubular Modular Track in stations to ensure fixed vertical alignment between platforms and trains.

=== Nigeria ===
Plans by Nigeria's to change convert its 1,067 mm (3 ft 6 in) gauge lines to 1,435 mm (4 ft 8 1/2 in) have accelerated in 2020. Some new lines are double track replacing single track sections.

=== Libya ===
Libya started in 2007 building a completely new 1,435 mm (4 ft 8 1/2 in) railway system, albeit slowly. A link across the Sahara to Central Africa, probably Nigeria, would also spur the growth of 1,435 mm (4 ft 8 1/2 in) connections, which make use of continuous access to the Middle East, Europe, and even China in the foreseeable future. In March 2011, the works ground to a halt because of the revolution with no news when or even if they would resume.

=== Tanzania, Kenya and Uganda ===
Tanzania, Kenya and Uganda are odd men in the 1,067 mm (3 ft 6 in) South & East zone as they use 1,000 mm (3 ft 3 3/8 in) gauge.

The latest plans for a greatly expanded railway with links to adjoining countries are to build new lines in standard gauge and possibly upgrade and convert existing metre gauge lines to the same wider gauge.

=== Zambia ===
- Mchinji – connects to Malawi Railways
- (Zambia) Chipata (1,212 m or 3,976 ft) – railhead – opened 2010

=== Iron ore railways ===
Heavy duty iron ore railways in Africa carry much more traffic than ordinary railways so they almost always adopt standard gauge to make use of proven off the shelf technology. New such lines are planned for Cameroon, Senegal and Guinea. Gabon is already using 1,435 mm (4 ft 8 1/2 in). The Transguinean Railways is proposed to be standard gauge. Some standard gauge lines in Liberia are to be restored. An isolated 3 ft 6 in (1,067 mm) gauge line in Sierra Leone is to be converted to standard gauge.

=== African Integrated High Speed Railway Network ===
The planned African integrated high-speed rail network, part of the African Union's Vision 2063 project. Accelerated pilot projects and a few pilot projects reached the planning phase in 2022.

In 2013, the African Union (AU) passed Agenda 2063: a 50-year development trajectory which includes a continental free trade zone, a common passport, an end to armed conflict, an annual African economic forum, a space program, a Great African Museum, establishment of e-universities, and a high-speed rail network. Africa has the lowest rail density of any inhabited continents, with 16 countries lacking rail altogether (especially in Central Africa); most rail lines are single-track freight lines operating at 30|km/h, traveling from ports to industrial zones such as mines and forests.

The AU signed a memorandum of understanding with China in 2014 for the 30– to 50-year development of a continental rail system connecting all African capitals with modern rail technology, facilitating interoperability by using one gauge instead of the current nine. The network's goal is to facilitate intra-African trade and lower shipping costs. Its initial timeline for 2022 was the completion of preparatory work; only 12.3 percent of the network was studied, however, largely due to funding constraints. Completed pre-feasibility studies include the 2,891-kilometre (1,796 mi) Cotonou-Niamey-Ouagadougou-Abidjan Railway, which would cost US$5.022 billion to build and rehabilitate and US$866 million to equip. The Djibouti-Libreville corridor was estimated to be 2,366 kilometres (1,470 mi) long and cost $5.277 billion, and the Dakar-N'Djamena-Djibouti corridor was estimated to be 5,139 kilometres (3,193 mi) in length and cost $14.05 billion. It has not yet been specified which rail lines would operate at 330 km/h (205 mph), 250 km/h (155 mph), or 160 km/h (100 mph).

A master plan for 2033 envisions 35,828 kilometres (22,262 mi) of rail construction with the following projects. The first three are accelerated pilot projects under study or construction. The objectives by 2033 are to connect 16 landlocked countries to seaports and connect regions with trans-Africa corridors. The 2043 master plan would expand the network to connect Africa's political and economic capitals by rail.

- Accelerated pilot projects:
  - Kigali-Dar Es Salaam: 1,476 km (917 mi)
  - Kampala-Bujumbura: 596 km (370 mi)
  - Walvis Bay-Windhoek-Gaborone-Johannesburg: 1,643 km (1,021 mi)
- 2033 master plan:
  - Nairobi-Mombasa: 459 km (285 mi)
  - Bamako-Ouagadougou-Niamey-N'Djamena-Khartoum: 5,384 km (3,345 mi)
  - Addis Ababa-Djibouti: 637 km (396 mi)
  - Pointe Noire-Brazzaville-Kinshasa-Bujumbura: 1,755 km (1,091 mi)
  - Johannesburg-Maputo: 524 km (326 mi)
  - Pretoria-Durban: 626 km (389 mi)
  - Algiers-Abuja-Lagos: 4,111 km (2,554 mi)
  - Lobito-Lusaka: 2,253 km (1,400 mi)
  - N'Djamena-Bangui-Brazzaville-Luanda: 2,240 km (1,390 mi)
  - Addis Ababa-Nairobi-Dodoma-Lusaka-Gaborone: 4,812 km (2,990 mi)
  - Khartoum-Addis Ababa
  - Luanda-Windhoek: 1,882 km (1,169 mi)
  - Mbeya-Lilongwe-Harare-Johannesburg-Maseru: 3,115 km (1,936 mi)
  - Lilongwe-Nacala: 815 km (506 mi)
  - Lamu-Juba: 1,547 km (961 mi)
  - Bangui-Juba: 1,551 km (964 mi)
  - Juba-Kampala: 672 km (418 mi)
- 2033 pilot projects:
  - Tunis-Algiers-Casablanca: 1,981 km (1,231 mi)
  - Douala-Bangui
  - Kampala-Nairobi
  - Dakar-Bamako 1,147 km (713 mi)
  - Asmara-Addis Ababa: 771 km (479 mi)
  - Lusaka-Beira
  - Alexandria-Khartoum
  - Ouagadougou-Abidjan: 1,120 km (700 mi)
  - Niamey-Cotonou: 955 km (593 mi)
- 2043 master plan:
  - Alexandria-Benghazi-Tripoli-Tunis: 2,770 km (1,720 mi)
  - Casablanca-Laayoune-Nouakchott-Dakar: 2,733 km (1,698 mi)
  - Dakar-Banjul-Conakry-Monrovia-Abidjan-Accra-Lagos-Douala: 7,595 km (4,719 mi)
  - Yaoundé-Bata-Libreville: 594 km (369 mi)
  - Mogadishu-Addis Ababa
  - Windhoek-Cape Town: 1,632 km (1,014 mi)
  - Maseru-Cape Town: 1,135 km (705 mi)
  - Tripoli-N'Djamena: 2,437 km (1,514 mi)

High Speed Lines

== Conferences ==
- – a conference held in Brazzaville on 10–14 April 2006.
- 35th General Assembly
- 2006

== Timeline ==
=== 2023 ===
The rail link on the Brazzaville–Kinshasa Bridge will be single track. Both sides of the bridge use the same 1067mm gauge. For compatibility with future AIHSRN a third rail or Dual Gauge sleepers should be provided.

=== 2010 ===
- Dakar-Port Sudan Railway

=== 2007 ===
- Railway Corridors in Continent to be Connected – The UAR is set to work out modalities on how to link all railway corridors in the continent.

== Related organisations ==
- Northern Corridor Transit and Transport Coordination Authority
- Southern African Railway Association
- United Nations Conference on Trade and Development (UNCTAD)
- Southern African Railway Association
- ECOWAS rail

== Similar organisations ==
- Association of American Railroads (AAR)
- International Union of Railways (UIC)
- OSShD

== See also ==
- African Integrated High Speed Rail Network (AIHSRN)
- AfricaRail
- East African Railway Master Plan
- North-South Corridor Project
- Timeline of African Union of Railways
- Trans-Asian Railway
