= Lolabé =

Village in South Province, Cameroon

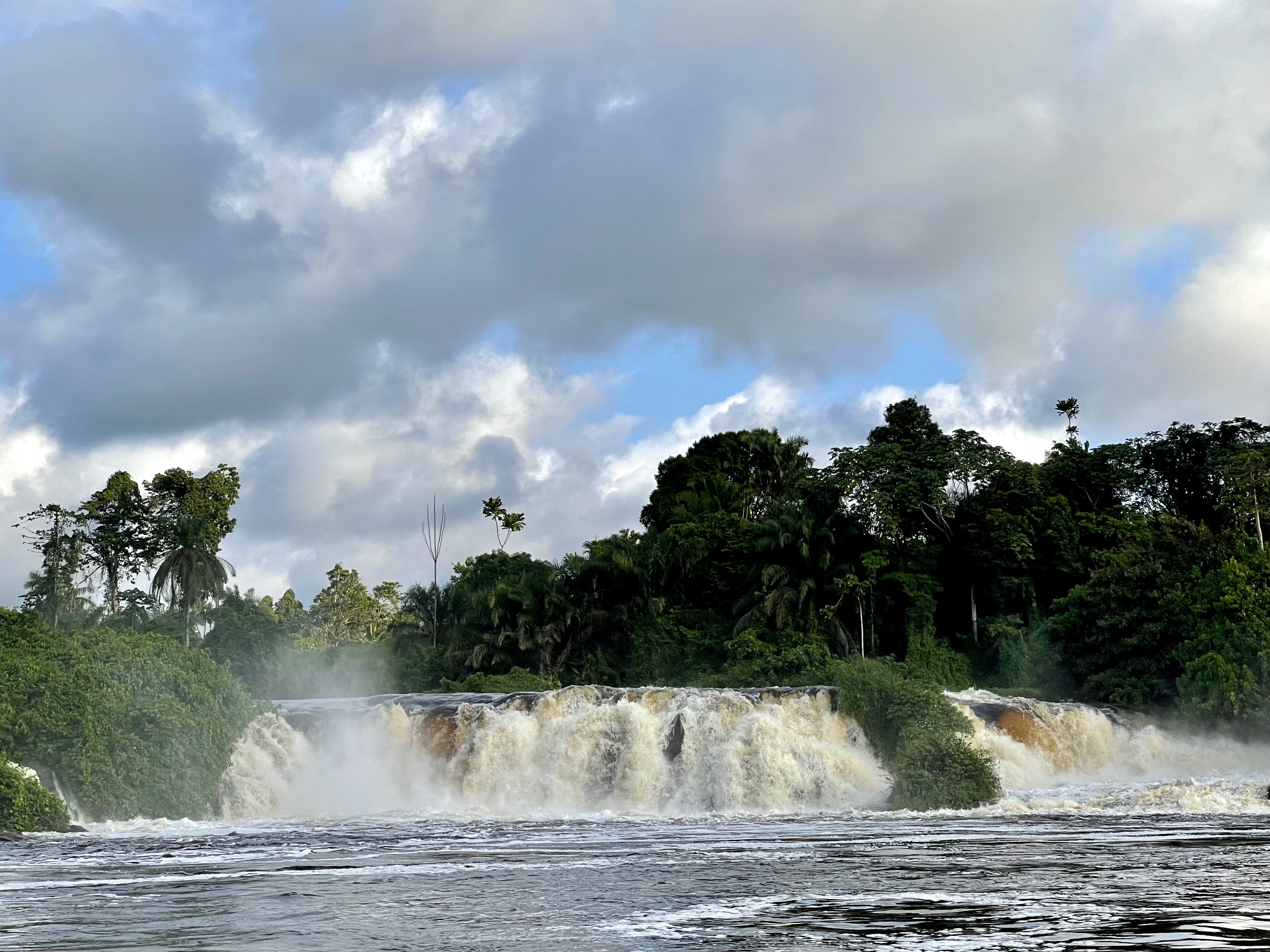

- Location in Cameroon
- Coordinates: 02°40′00″N 09°51′00″E
- Country: Cameroon
- Province: South Province

Lolabé is a small coastal town in Cameroon. It lies on the Atlantic Ocean, about halfway between Kribi and the border with Equatorial Guinea.

== Port ==
The town has been chosen as the site for a port serving an iron ore railway (or slurry pipeline) from Mbalam. There will be a causeway about 700m long followed by a jetty 400m long. An area will be dredged to 22m to take 250,000 DWT Capesize ships or 24m to take 300,000 DWT Chinamax ships. In September 2010, Sundance signed an MoU with China Harbour Engineering Co Ltd (CHEC) for construction of the port, which would be able to handle 35 million tons of iron ore per year for 25 years. Contracts for construction of port, railway and mine, signed in June 2014.

The location of the port has no natural outcroppings, so the port will consist of a long pier extending out to sea, with suitable dredging.

== Timeline ==
=== 2014 ===
- Contracts signed to build mine, railway and Chinamax port for iron ore traffic.

== See also ==
- Transport in Cameroon
- Railway stations in Cameroon
- Iron ore in Africa
- List of Panamax ports
