= Mésondo =

- Location in Cameroon
- Coordinates: 3°41′0″N 10°29′0″E
- Country: Cameroon
- Elevation: 581 ft (177 m)

Mesondo is a town in the Nyong-et-Kéllé department, Centre Region, Cameroon.

== Transport ==
It has a station on the Cameroon Railways.

== See also ==
- Railway stations in Cameroon
- Transport in Cameroon
