= Mbalam mine =

Planned iron ore mine in East, Cameroon

- Location within Cameroon
- Location: outside Mbalam, East Region, Cameroon; 2.22°N 13.89°E
- Products: Iron ore
- Company: Disputed

The Mbalam mine refers to a series of ongoing attempts to mine iron ore from the Mbalam iron ore deposit in Cameroon and the Republic of the Congo.

== Mbalam Deposit ==
The Mbalam deposit is located primarily in south-east Cameroon in the East Region, along its southern border with the Republic of the Congo. It also extends into the Congo, where it connects to the Nabeba and Ibanga deposits. The deposit is variously estimated to contain 2.5 billion tonnes (2.5 trillion kg; 5.5 trillion lb) of ore at 40% iron composition, or 800 million tonnes (800 billion kg; 1.8 trillion lb) with 62% iron composition. The deposit was initially identified by the United Nations Development Programme (UNDP) in the 1970s and 1980s. Mining proposals in the 2010s aimed for 35-40 million tonnes of annual production from the deposit.

== Status ==
Attempts to perform large-scale mining on the Mbalam deposit date back to at least 2005, but plans for the mines have been consistently delayed.

=== 2000s ===
In 2005, Australia's Sundance Resources incorporated a subsidiary company, Cam Iron SA, to begin mining. Sundance/Cam Iron's exploratory drilling began in 2007.

=== 2010s ===
Nothing more than installation and exploratory work had begun by the mid-2010s, according to Sundance reports and a UNDP grant application. Sundance completed its Definitive Feasibility Study on the first phase of its mining plans in 2011. In 2014, production was expected to start in 2017.

However, Sundance encountered difficulties in finding investors. They were granted at least two extensions to secure additional funding, in July 2017 and early 2018. By 2021, both Cameroon and the Congo had revoked its mining rights to the deposit. Sundance and the two countries have a pending case before the International Court of Arbitration, with an expected resolution no sooner than 2026 for the Cameroonian component.

=== 2020s ===
In December 2022, Cameroonian President Paul Biya announced the "start of major mining projects", and a joint Cameroonian-Congolese meeting in February 2023 confirmed that work on the joint Mbalam-Nabeba mining project was moving forward. In 2024, Sangha Mining, a Chinese mining company, started a mining project on the deposit. Iron production is supposed to begin in December 2025.

== See also ==
- List of mines in Cameroon
- List of iron mines
