= Rail transport in Chad =

Up to 2012 Chad had no rail system. Two lines are planned to Sudan and Cameroon from the capital, with construction expected to start in February 2016 and be complete in 4 years.

== History ==
=== Early railroad schemes – 19th century ===
A 1905 book describes the history of a German railroad syndicate's exploration of Chad:

In 1885, the new German colony of Kamerun came into being. A number of influential Germans determined that the colony’s economic potential could be realized only through the construction of a railroad. They established a Cameroon railroad syndicate in 1900, which in 1902 obtained a concession from the German government to build a line that would open the colony’s interior to trade. The syndicate sponsored expeditions in 1902–3 and 1904 to survey the projected route.

=== 20th century ===
Several plans or proposals to build railways during the French colonial period (French Equatorial Africa) in Chad, and to connect Chad to other African railway networks (Cameroon, Nigeria, Oubangui/Central African Republic). Early proposals include a line extending from the Cameroon rail system at Douala into Chad in the 1930s. One early unofficial plan was a study for a railway from Douala in Cameroon to Bangui, which was part of the pre-World War I German Imperial expansionist policy known as Mittelafrika.

In the 1950s, a line through Chad from Port Sudan to Nigeria was proposed but opposed by Chad governmental organisations.

In 1958, plans for a line from Cameroon the Société Civile d'Études du Chemin de Fer Douala-Tchad (SEDOT) was formed, and continued planning led to start of construction in 1964 - the line was constructed as far as Ngaoundéré in Cameroon (the Trans-Cameroon Railway, completed 1975.). Initial plans were for an extension to Moundou in Chad, but this was not completed.

In 1959, a multinational agency, the Agence Transéquatoriale des Communications (ATEC) was formed to manage cooperation between Chad, the Central African Republic, Gabon and Republic of Congo, and administer a system of river and railway links (named Route Fédérale) serving the interior via a coastal termination at Pointe Noire; a line from Bangui (CAF) to Chad (Bangui-Chad railroad, or Le chemin de fer Bangui-Tchad.) was under consideration as part of this scheme. The Bangui-Chad railroad project reached the preliminary planning stage, including costing studies – the project was terminated in 1962.

=== 21st Century ===
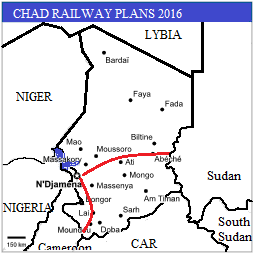
Map of the proposed Railway System in Chad.(Routes indicative).

In March 2011, Chad and China Civil Engineering Construction Corp (CCECC) reached agreement on a (estimated $7 billion) contract to build over 1300 km of standard gauge railway lines in Chad. The lines would be built primarily for freight, but would also carry passengers. In August 2011, Sudan, Chad and the Export-Import Bank of China were reported to have reached an agreement to construct a cross border line from Chad's capital to the rail line at Nyala, Sudan. On 24 December 2011, the Ministry of Transport & Civil Aviation of Chad and CCECC signed the agreement (then valued at $5.6 billion) for the line's construction - with construction planned to start in February 2012.

Two lines are planned: one from the capital N'Djamena to Moundou and Koutéré on the Cameroon border (528 km), and one from the capital to the border with Sudan (836 km) via Abéché and Adré. The lines are to be built to standard gauge and for 120 km/h running, and equipment for the line will be sourced in China.

There were no railways in Chad before 2012.

=== 2011 ===
Cameroon-Chad

=== 2014 ===
In 2012, construction was reported started on a new 161km, standard (1435mm) gauge from Adré, on the border with Sudan, to Abéché. However, it would appear that little progress has been made, despite a further report that construction was under way in 2016. If eventually completed, this will be the first railway in Chad; it is proposed that it would connect with a new railway in Sudan from Port Sudan on the Red Sea. A further 575km section in Chad would run from Abéché to the capital, N’Djamena.

=== 2015 ===
- Cameroon-Chad railway
- Sudan-Chad railway

=== 2021 ===
Funding was approved in 2021 for a feasibility study into a 528 km line from N’Djamena to Koutéré on the border with Cameroon, where it would connect with a new railway from the rail head at Ngaoundéré.

=== 2023 ===
- Since the rail line in Cameroon from the Port of Douala to the Chad border, recently upgraded, is metre gauge (1000mm) a break of gauge problem will occur when the standard gauge line in Chad meets a new line from Ngaoundéré in Cameroon at the Chad border.

A new standard gauge railway for iron ore traffic is under construction between Kribi and Mbalam with a future connection to the existing metre gauge railway

Talgo RD gauge-changing trains may be able to overcome this break of gauge.

== Maps ==
- UN Map - no railways yet

== Stations ==
=== Proposed ===
- Nyala, Sudan
- Ndjamena, Chad capital
- Abahe-Adre, Chad
- Ngaoundéré, Cameroon railhead
- Yaoundé, Cameroon capital
- Douala, Cameroon.

== See also ==
- Economy of Chad
- Transport in Chad
- Railway stations in Cameroon
