= Southern African Railways Association =

Association of railway companies in southern Africa

The Southern African Railways Association (SARA) is the association of railway companies in the SADC region, especially those using 3 ft 6 in (1,067 mm) gauge. Besides railway operating companies, it welcomes also other stakeholders of the railway industry, like suppliers of railway technology and some important customers. SARA was founded in 1996 and is a not for profit organisation. SARA has its seat in Harare, Zimbabwe.

Besides promoting and lobbying for rail transport, SARA aims to promote interconnectivity and cross border operability of railways for a regional and continental rail network connectivity in Southern Africa.

15 railway companies from 10 countries (Angola, Botswana, D.R. Congo, Mozambique, Namibia, South Africa, Tanzania, Zambia and Zimbabwe) are members of SARA, as well as regulation authorities and other companies.

== See also ==
- African Union of Railways
