= Quantm =

Quantm is a software package, marketed as Trimble Quantm, used to design roads and railway alignments. The program performs an otherwise tedious and laborious task where an immense amount of data are involved and choices have to be made between a considerable number of options. The Quantm software takes the data and constraints into account and generates a prioritised list of optimised alignments that the user can choose between.

Quantm was originally developed by the Australian research organisation CSIRO. The software was bought in 2006 by Trimble Navigation (now Trimble, Inc.) and further developed at Trimble Alignment Planning Solutions in Melbourne, Australia.

== Examples ==
- - Iron ore railway in Cameroon from Mbalam.
