= Rail transport in Cameroon =

System map.

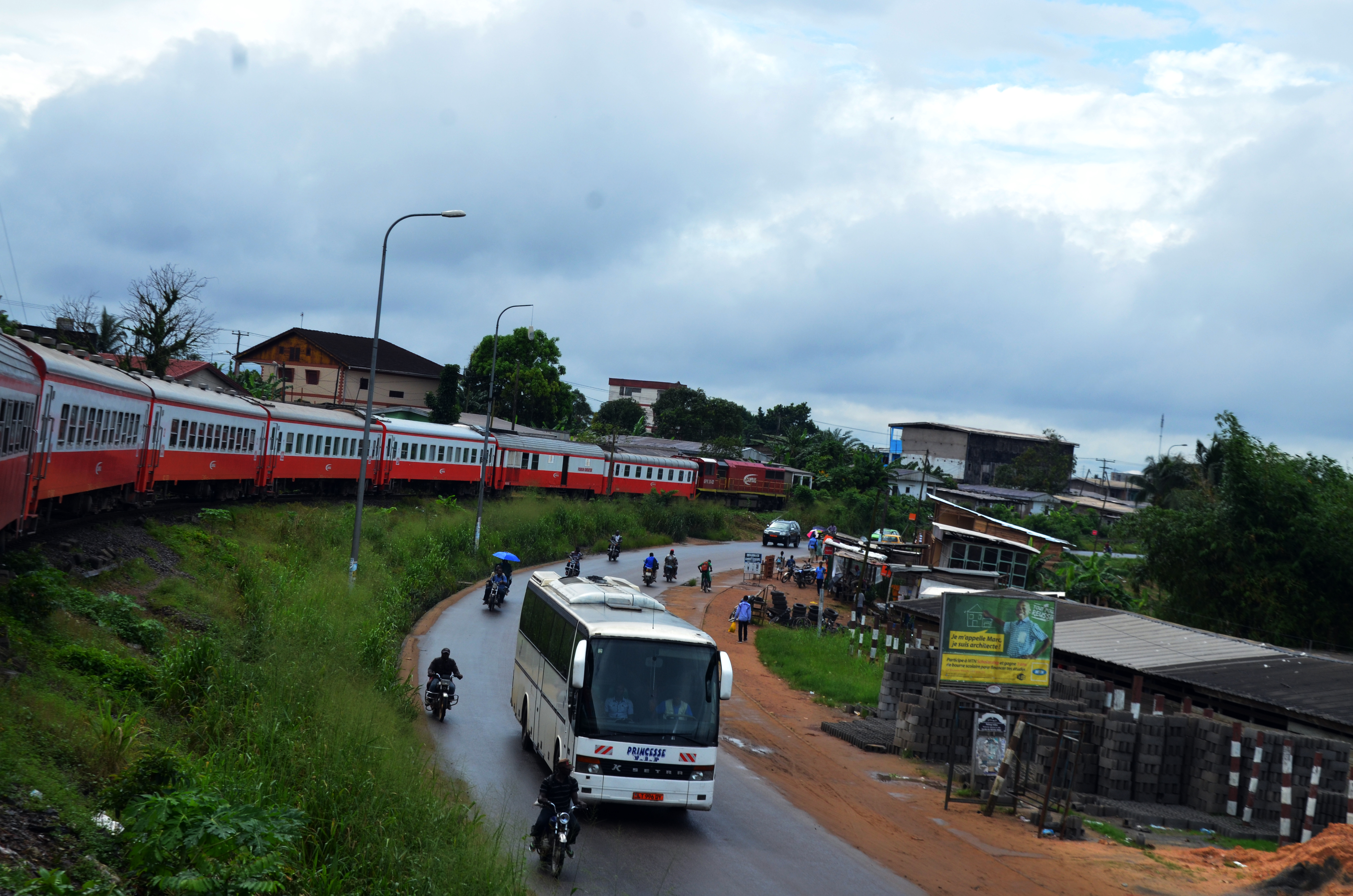
A train in circulation in Douala

Rail transport in Cameroon is primarily operated by Camrail, a subsidiary of Bolloré Africa Logistics.

== History ==
In January 2022, it was announced that container shipping company MSC would take over Bolloré Africa Logistics, the parent company of Camrail. It is uncertain whether MSC, which has an annual turnover of around €30 billion, will maintain passenger transport on Cameroon's railways or prioritise the movement of its own containers. The development contrasts with the railways of neighbouring Nigeria, where passenger transport is making a profit and freight transport is in decline.

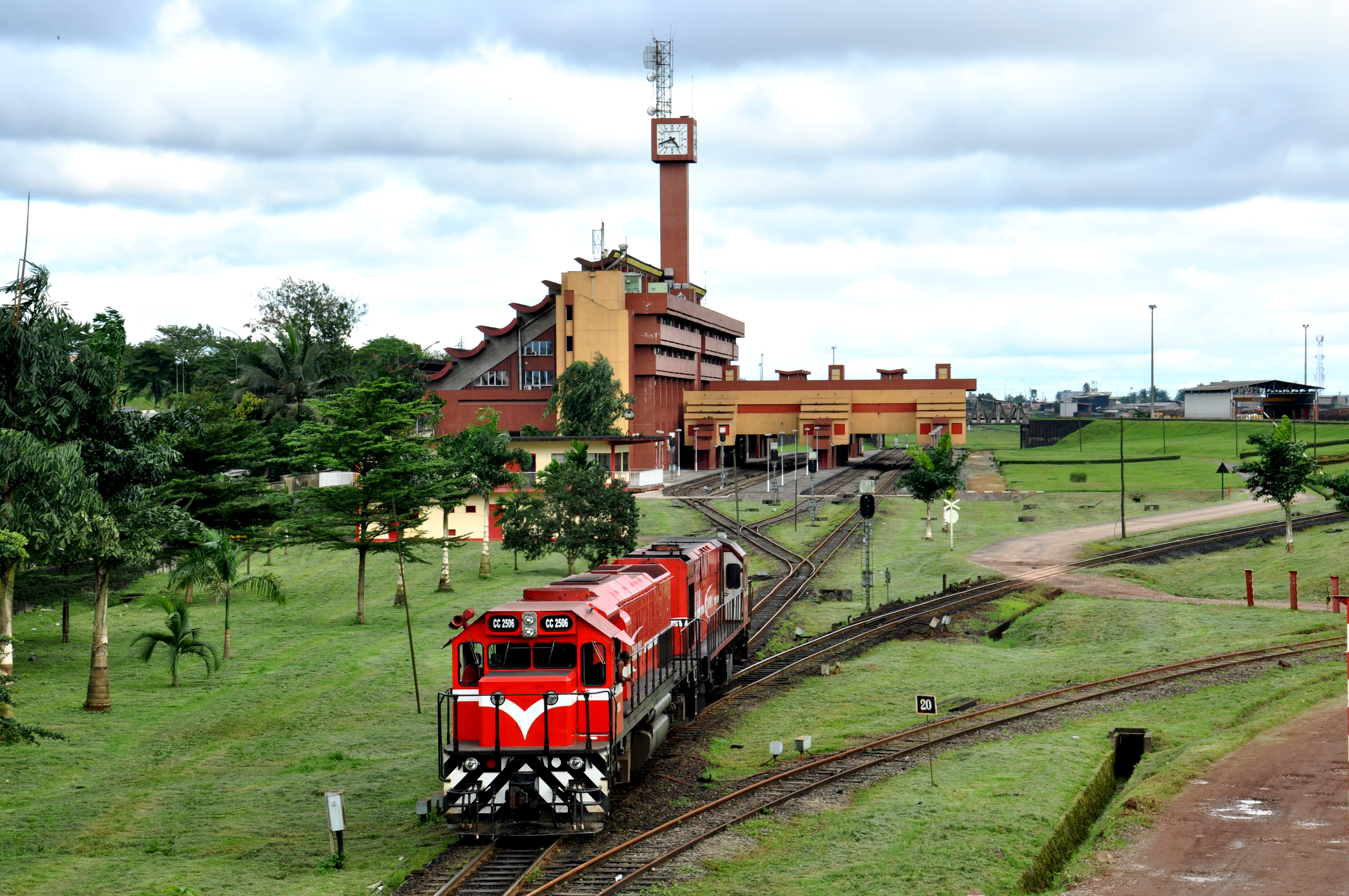
Train leaving the Douala railway station.

== Infrastructure ==
Separate from the metre gauge mainlines were narrow gauge plantation railways, especially in the Tiko area. These served cocoa and sugar plantations.

=== Possible extensions ===
There are plans for an iron ore railway, which however might be isolated from existing railways. The distance from the mine to a port is about 510 km. A connection to the nearest Camrail line at Mbalmayo on the Nyong River would be 350 km long. Because of the heavy tonnages to be carried, this railway is to be 1,435 mm (4 ft 8 1/2 in) (standard gauge). The railway would run from mines near Mbalam to a new port at Kribi. The expected traffic is 35 million tonnes per year for 25 years.

Extensions of the rail network to Maroua and Yokadouma to promote the forestry industry have also been recommended.

In December 2010, it was reported that a South Korean consortium planned to build new railways in Cameroon.

== Adjacent countries ==
There are no links yet to railways in adjoining countries. The nearest the Nigerian railway system (3 ft 6 in (1,067 mm)) approaches Cameroon is Maiduguri over 100 km from the northern Cameroon border. The Gabon rail system (1,435 mm 4ft 8.5in) and Congolese rail systems 3 ft 6 in (1,067 mm) gauge do not run near to the Cameroonian border.

In 2011 funding for construction of a standard gauge railway line in Chad was obtained; the construction would include a line to Moundou and Koutéré near the Cameroon border, as well as a link to Nyala on the border with Sudan.

== Rolling stock ==
=== Locomotives ===
Type	Built	Manufacturer	#	?	№	2nd?	Notes
BB 1000	1978	Moyse	?		?		Only one (BB 1039) left in service in 2012 in Douala
BB 1100	1981	Alstom	20		1101–1120		
BB 1200	1968	Alstom	20		1201–1213		3 remained in 2012
CC 2200	1980	MLW/Bombardier	30		2201–2230		
CC 2600	1975	GM-EMD	6		2601–2606	(South Africa)	Series 34-800 obtained from Spoornet, South Africa
CC 3301	2009	NREC	2		3301–3302		Freight locomotives
CC 35.2	1974	GM-EMD	6		?	(South Africa)	Series 35-200 leased 2000–2003 from Spoornet, South Africa
ZE 500	1976	Alstom	5		501–505	(Portugal)	Former series 9600 obtained from CP (Portugal) in 2005

== Standards ==
=== Metre gauge ===
- Brakes: Westinghouse Air
- Couplings: SA3
- Loading gauge width
- Curve radius minimum
- Axleload 20.0 tonne

=== Standard gauge ===
- Brakes
- Couplings
- Loading gauge width.
- Curve radius minimum
- Axleload 37.5 tonne

== See also ==
- Railway stations in Cameroon
