= Sundance Resources =

Sundance Resources Limited
- Type: Public
- Industry: Mining
- Headquarters: Perth, Australia
- Products: Iron ore
- Revenue: ▼$1,806,383 (2020); $4,123,768 (2019)
- Net income: ▲ -$6,655,546 (2020); -$199,145,941 (2019)
- Total assets: ▲$2,325,870 (2020); $349,889 (2019)
- Website: www.sundanceresources.com.au

Sundance Resources Limited is an Australian mining company, based in Perth, Western Australia, whose main assets are iron ore leases in Cameroon near Mbalam, and across the border in the Republic of Congo. Following the loss of the Congo mining licence in 2020, Sundance Resources delisted from the Australian Securities Exchange and sued Congo to acquire $8.76 billion in compensation.

To exploit these leases, a 500 km railway (or perhaps a slurry pipeline) is required to a new multi-user port at Lolabé on the Atlantic coast. However, the development of the project has been postponed due to the market conditions for ore.

The company made headlines in June 2010 when all of the company's directors and some other officers were killed in an airplane crash in the Republic of Congo.

== Company history ==
Sundance Resources was listed on the Australian Securities Exchange, the ASX, in 1993, then under the name of St Francis Mining NL (SFM). It changed this name to St Francis Mining Limited in October 1999. It traded under this name for only a short time before becoming the St Francis Group Limited (SFG) in June 2000. In December 2003, the St Francis Group Limited became Sundance Resources Limited (SDL), the company's current name.

The company was listed on the ASX and also traded on over-the-counter markets in Frankfurt, Munich, Berlin, Hamburg and Stuttgart, Germany.

== Mbalam project ==
Sundance announced the acquisition of a 100% interest, since reduced to 90%, in Cam Iron SA, a company incorporated in Cameroon, in March 2006. Cam was the owner of exploration permit No 92 which covered an area of 875 square kilometres over the Mbalam iron ore province. Mbalam is located about 300 km east-southeast of the capital city of Yaoundé in the southern part of Cameroon. The deposit was identified in 1982 by the United Nations Development Fund.

=== Republic of Congo ===
Sundance also holds an 85% interest in iron ore deposits across the border in the Republic of Congo, which would be served by a branch off the main railway.

=== Timeline ===
2010

- In September a deal was reached to build the railway.

2011

- A deal was struck with Legend Resources, also of Australia, to share railway and port infrastructure.

2016

- January – the development of the project was put on hold until market conditions improve, after a key infrastructure contractor postponed the signing of a contract, citing low ore prices.

== Accident ==
On 19 June 2010, an airplane crash in the Republic of Congo killed many of the company's executives including the entire board of directors, consisting of the following people:

- Geoff Wedlock, Non Executive Chairman
- Don Lewis, Managing Director / Chief Executive Officer
- Ken Talbot, Non Executive Director
- Craig Oliver, Non Executive Director
- John Carr-Gregg, Company Secretary / General Manager Corporate Services
- John Jones, Non Executive Director

Additionally, a further five people were killed in the accident: two pilots, a consultant for Sundance and a British and a French citizen.

The company halted its African operations and ordered staff to help find the plane. Trading of its shares was also halted and Peter Canterbury was named acting chief executive. Former chairman George Jones said that the disappearance of the entire board would not spell the end for the company.

=== Aftermath ===
Strictly speaking, if there are no surviving board members, then there is no-one to appoint new members to a new board. However, ASIC, the corporate regulator, has approved the co-option of a former chairman to co-opt other members to a new board, which will be put before a shareholder's meeting at the earliest practical opportunity.

== Hanlong takeover attempt ==
In October 2011, the Chinese Hanlong Group launched a takeover attempt for Sundance. Although an agreement was reached to purchase the company, the deal fell through in April 2013 when Hanlong was unable to meet its funding obligations.

== See also ==
- Iron ore in Africa
- Railway stations in Cameroon
