= Otélé =

- Location in Cameroon
- Coordinates: 3°35′0″N 11°15′0″E
- Country: Cameroon
- Province: Centre Province
- Elevation: 2,467 ft (752 m)

Otele is a town in central Cameroon.

== Transport ==
It is served by the main line of Cameroon Railways. It is the junction for a short branch line to the river port of Mbalmayo.

== Climate ==
Köppen-Geiger climate classification system classifies its climate as tropical wet and dry (Aw).

Climate data for Otélé
Month	Jan	Feb	Mar	Apr	May	Jun	Jul	Aug	Sep	Oct	Nov	Dec	Year
Mean daily maximum °C (°F)	29.3 (84.7)	29.7 (85.5)	29.5 (85.1)	29.5 (85.1)	28.7 (83.7)	27.3 (81.1)	26.3 (79.3)	26.3 (79.3)	26.9 (80.4)	27.5 (81.5)	28 (82)	28.6 (83.5)	28.1 (82.6)
Daily mean °C (°F)	24.6 (76.3)	24.8 (76.6)	24.6 (76.3)	24.5 (76.1)	24.3 (75.7)	23.3 (73.9)	22.6 (72.7)	22.4 (72.3)	23 (73)	23.2 (73.8)	23.5 (74.3)	24.1 (75.4)	23.7 (74.7)
Mean daily minimum °C (°F)	19.9 (67.8)	19.9 (67.8)	19.8 (67.6)	19.5 (67.1)	19.9 (67.8)	19.4 (66.9)	19 (66)	18.5 (65.3)	19.2 (66.6)	18.9 (66.0)	19.1 (66.4)	19.7 (67.5)	19.4 (66.9)
Average precipitation mm (inches)	27 (1.1)	59 (2.3)	157 (6.2)	203 (8.0)	238 (9.4)	172 (6.8)	83 (3.3)	115 (4.5)	272 (10.7)	319 (12.6)	136 (5.4)	31 (1.2)	1,812 (71.5)
Source: Climate-Data.org, altitude: 688m

== See also ==
- List of municipalities of Cameroon
- Transport in Cameroon
- Railway stations in Cameroon
