= Koutéré =

Koutéré كوتيري
- Location in Chad
- Coordinates: 8°08′N 15°31′E
- Country: Chad
- Region: Logone Occidental Region
- Department: Lac Wey
- Sub-Prefecture: Koutéré
- Elevation: 400 m (1,300 ft)

Population (2012)
  - Total: 14,000
- Time zone: +1

Koutéré (Arabic: كوتيري) is a small town in Chad on the border with Cameroon.

== Transport ==
A standard gauge railway in Chad is proposed to cross the border at or near this town.

In 2020, the Central African Economic and Monetary Community (CEMAC) called for bidding to create a single checkpoint in Koutéré, with the plan to build an infrastructure that will improve transit and border crossing conditions. This infrastructure is expected to reduce transport time, transport cost, customs clearance time, and physical and non-physical barriers along the Douala-Ndjamena corridor.

== See also ==
- Rail transport in Chad
