= Minim, Martap =

Minim
- Location within Cameroon
- Coordinates: 6.9683°N 12.8702°E
- Country: Cameroon
- Region: Adamawa
- Department: Vina
- Commune: Martap

Population (2005)
  - Total: 432

Minim (or Minim II, or Menim) is a village in the commune of Martap, in the department of Vina, in the Adamawa Region, Cameroon. The village contains Cameroon's main source of bauxite.

== Population ==
In 1967, Minim contained 90 inhabitants, mostly from the Kaka ethnic group. In the 2005 census, the settlement contained 432 people.

== Economy ==
Along with Ngaoundal, Minim is part of a large project to mine the bauxite of the Adamawa Plateau. Covering an area of 1000 km^{2}, the deposit represents an important component of the Adamawa plateau and the gentle slopes which surround it make it easy to access. Studies of feasibility and environmental impact were carried out and a mining development plan was completed in May 2016. Financing for the construction of a facility for refining the bauxite into aluminium and for transport infrastructure is still outstanding.

The metre gauge railway line and many of its bridges are being upgraded.

== Bibliography ==
- S.-M. Eno Belinga & François Desthieux, « Histoire géologique de Minim-Martap et du Ngaoundal », Annales de la Faculté des Sciences du Cameroun 5, pp. 27–32
- Jean Boutrais (ed.), Peuples et cultures de l'Adamaoua (Cameroun) : actes du colloque de Ngaoundéré, du 14 au 16 janvier 1992, ORSTOM, Paris; Ngaoundéré-Anthropos, 1993, 316 p. ISBN 2-7099-1167-1
- Dictionnaire des villages de l'Adamaoua, ONAREST, Yaoundé, octobre 1974, 133 p.
