= Bélabo =

- Location in Cameroon
- Coordinates: 4°56′N 13°18′E
- Country: Cameroon
- Province: Eastern Province

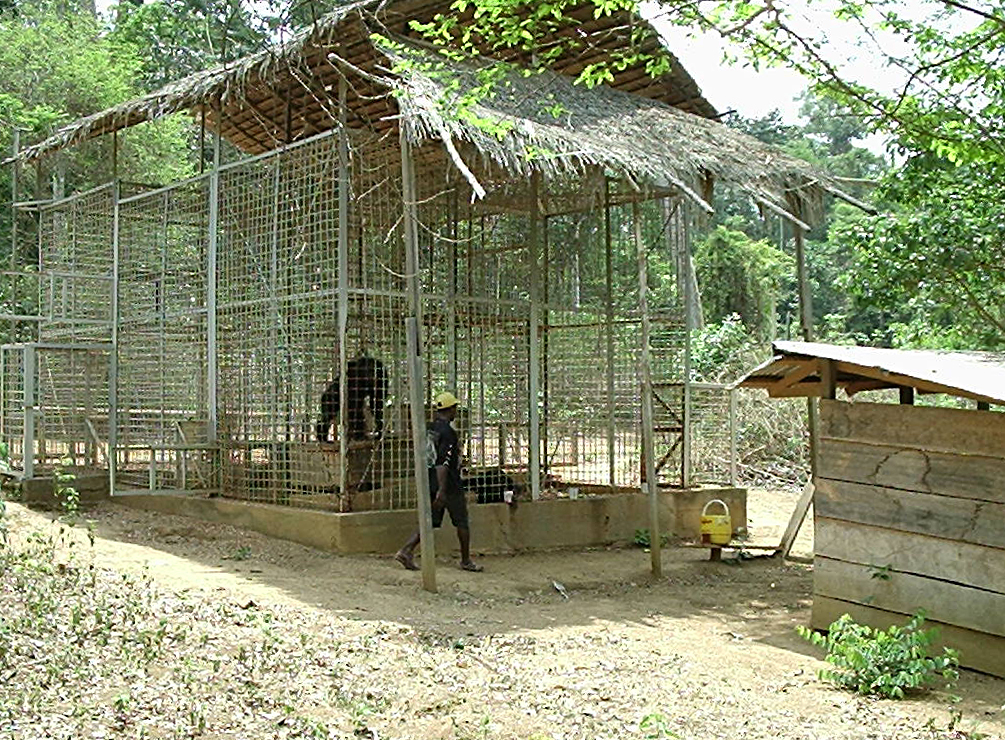
Chimpanzee rescue centre near Belabo

Bélabo is a town and commune in Cameroon, lying on the Yaoundé – N'Gaoundéré railway line. Near the town lies the Sanaga-Yong chimpanzee rescue centre.

== Transport ==
The town has a railway station served by Camrail, and lies on the Sanaga River.

== Factory ==
The town has a quarry supplying ballast and aggregate for a factory making concrete sleepers.

== Statistics ==
- Population = 22,553

== See also ==
- Railway stations in Cameroon
