= Railway stations in Cameroon =

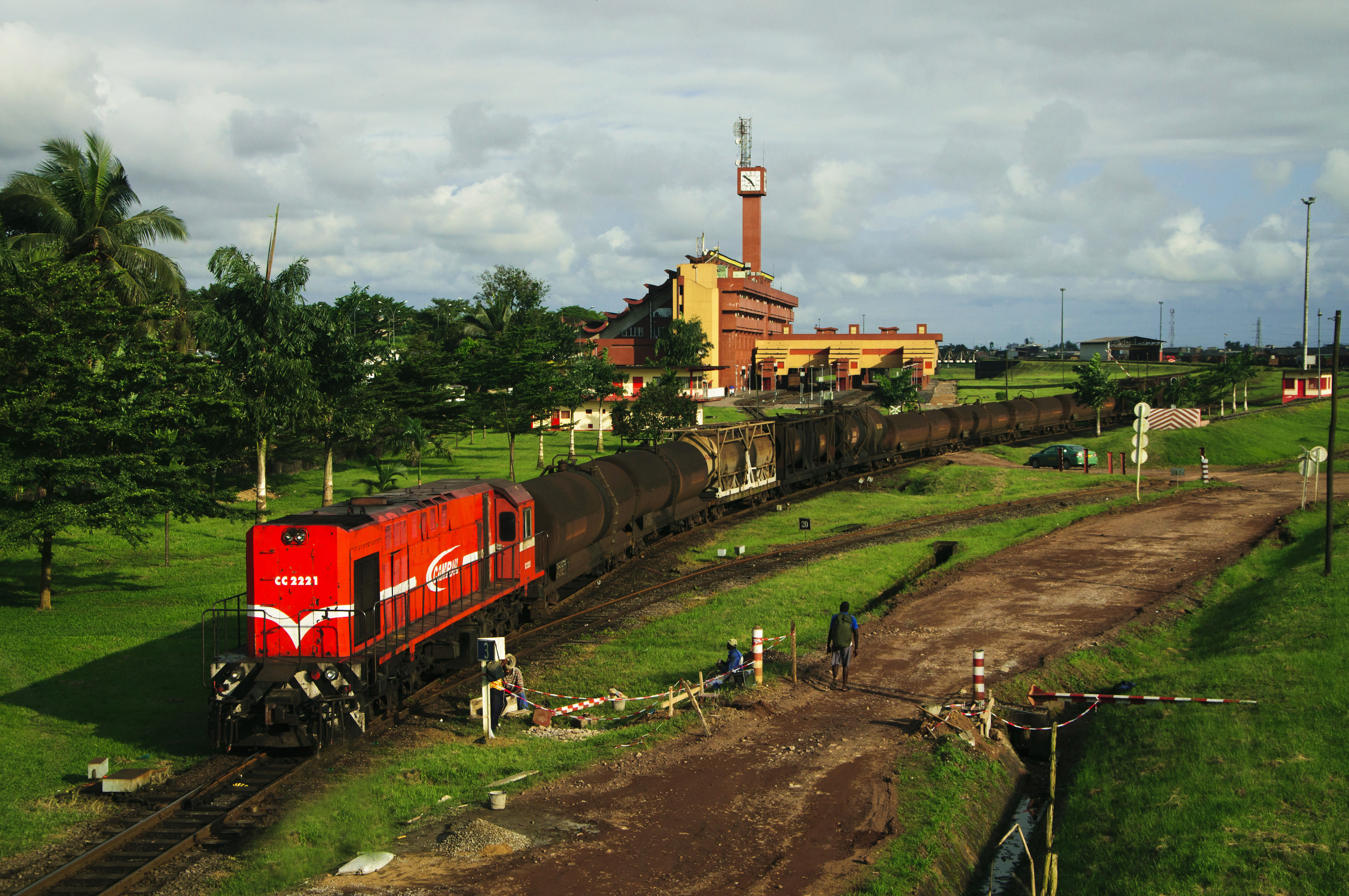
Douala railway station

The list of railway stations in Cameroon includes:

== Stations served by passenger trains ==
Order	Station name	Route(s)	Diesel Depot	Remarks	
10	Belabo	Ngaoundéré – Yaoundé	Depot		
000 km	Bessengué	Douala – Kumba; Douala – Yaoundé	Depot		
069 km	Edéa	Douala – Yaoundé		069 km	
-9	Ediki	Kumba – Mbanga			
75	Eséka	Douala – Yaoundé	Limited; Depot	Start steep incline	Overweight passenger tax
120	Kumba	Douala – Kumba; Kumba – Mbanga			
180	Makak	Douala – Yaoundé		End steep incline	
700	Mbandjock	Ngaoundéré – Yaoundé			
600	Minim	Ngaoundéré – Yaoundé			
000	Mbanga	Douala – Kumba; Kumba – Mbanga			
000	Nanga Eboko	Ngaoundéré – Yaoundé			
000	Ngaoundal	Ngaoundéré – Yaoundé			
750	Ngaoundéré Central Station	Ngaoundéré – Yaoundé	Depot		
400	Obala	Ngaoundéré – Yaoundé			
283 km	Yaoundé	Douala – Yaoundé; Ngaoundéré – Yaoundé	Depot		

== Towns served by rail ==
=== Existing ===
(600 mm (1 ft 11 5/8 in) gauge plantation railway)

- Limbe - port, terminal, cement works

(1,000 mm (3 ft 3 3/8 in) gauge)

- Nkongsamba (W) – railhead in northwest - rehabilitate
- Mbanga (W) – junction in west
  - Kumba (W) – branch terminus in west
- Bonabéri (W) – port in west

- Douala – river port - cement works - 62 km
- Edéa – river crossing Sanaga River; future junction to ocean port Kribi (114 km)
- Mésondo
- Eséka
- Makak located in Center Province
- Otélé junction for Mbalmayo
- Yaoundé national capital – cement works
- The railway line was extended from Yaoundé to Ngaoundéré, a distance of 622 km, and was inaugurated in 1974 2.

==== Rehabilitate ====
- Nanga Eboko
- Bélabo – ballast quarry and concrete sleeper plant
- Ngaoundal
- Ngaoundéré – bauxite – railhead
- Ngoumen
- Otélé – junction for Mbalmayo
  - Mbalmayo – river port branch railhead in east

=== Under construction ===
- There are plans for an iron ore railway belonging to Sundance Resources, isolated from existing railways, going from mine(s) around Mbalam to a port at Kribi. This line will be 1,435 mm (4 ft 8 1/2 in) gauge. This line would also extend a short distance into the Republic of Congo. In September, 2011, a deal was struck with Legend Resources, also of Australia, to share railway and port infrastructure for another iron ore mine. This line will be 1,435 mm (4 ft 8 1/2 in) gauge, but later on it links with the existing1,000 mm (3 ft 3 3/8 in) Camrail system. Contracts for construction were signed in June 2014. Since the tonnage to be carried on this line is about 35MTpa, it needs powerful locomotives, which implies 1,435 mm (4 ft 8 1/2 in). The line is said to be mostly double track.

The line will be built by the Portuguese company Mota-Engil

- (Cameroon) Kribi – port (0 km)
- (junction) (cross border extension to other mines) at Nabeba in (Republic of the Congo) Congo Brazzaville.
- (Cameroon) Mbalam – mine (510 km)

- Kribi - ocean port
- 130 km link for alumina traffic in 1000mm gauge or dual gauge (1435mm + 1000mm)
- Edéa – junction to Kribi.

- (junction) (0 km)
- (Cameroon) (Republic of the Congo) (border)
- (Republic of the Congo) Nabeba, Congo – iron ore mine (70 km)
- (Republic of the Congo) Avima, Congo

=== Proposed or upgrade ===
- In 2002, there were plans to extend a railway line from Kribi via Mbalmayo to Bangui in the Central African Republic.
- In September 2009, a Korean proposal surfaced to upgrade and duplicate the national railway system.
- In November 2013, Cameroon and China signed an agreement to build a high-speed standard gauge railway from Douala (port) to Yaoundé

- (eastwards)
- Mbalam
- Yokadouma for timber traffic

- (northwards)
- Ngaoundéré
- Maroua for timber traffic

- Ngaoundéré, Cameroon – northern railhead 0 km
- (Cameroon) (Chad) border
- N'Djamena – capital of Chad 1400 km

- These rail routes are
  - Edéa – proposed junction and possible break of gauge
  - Kribi – deep water ocean port and possible break of gauge
  - Douala – shallow river port
  - Limbe
  - Douala
  - Ngaoundéré

=== Break of gauge train ===
A passenger service across the standard gauge/metre gauge break of gauge near Kribi can be provided using the Swiss technology of the GoldenPass Express. This connects the mine at Mbalam with Douala port and Yaoundé the national capital. See Stadler Rail.

== Timeline ==
=== 2023 ===
- Mbalam to Kribi railway started.

=== 2020 ===
- Alumina mine at Minim, Martap and Birsok to Kribi port.

=== 2015 ===
- Cameroon-Chad railway

=== 2018 ===
- Cameroon started clearing the ground for a 130-km road and rail link from Edéa to the new ocean port at Kribi.

=== 2014 ===
- Birsok leases adjacent to Minim, Martap leases.

== Maps ==
- UN Map
- UNHCR Atlas Map

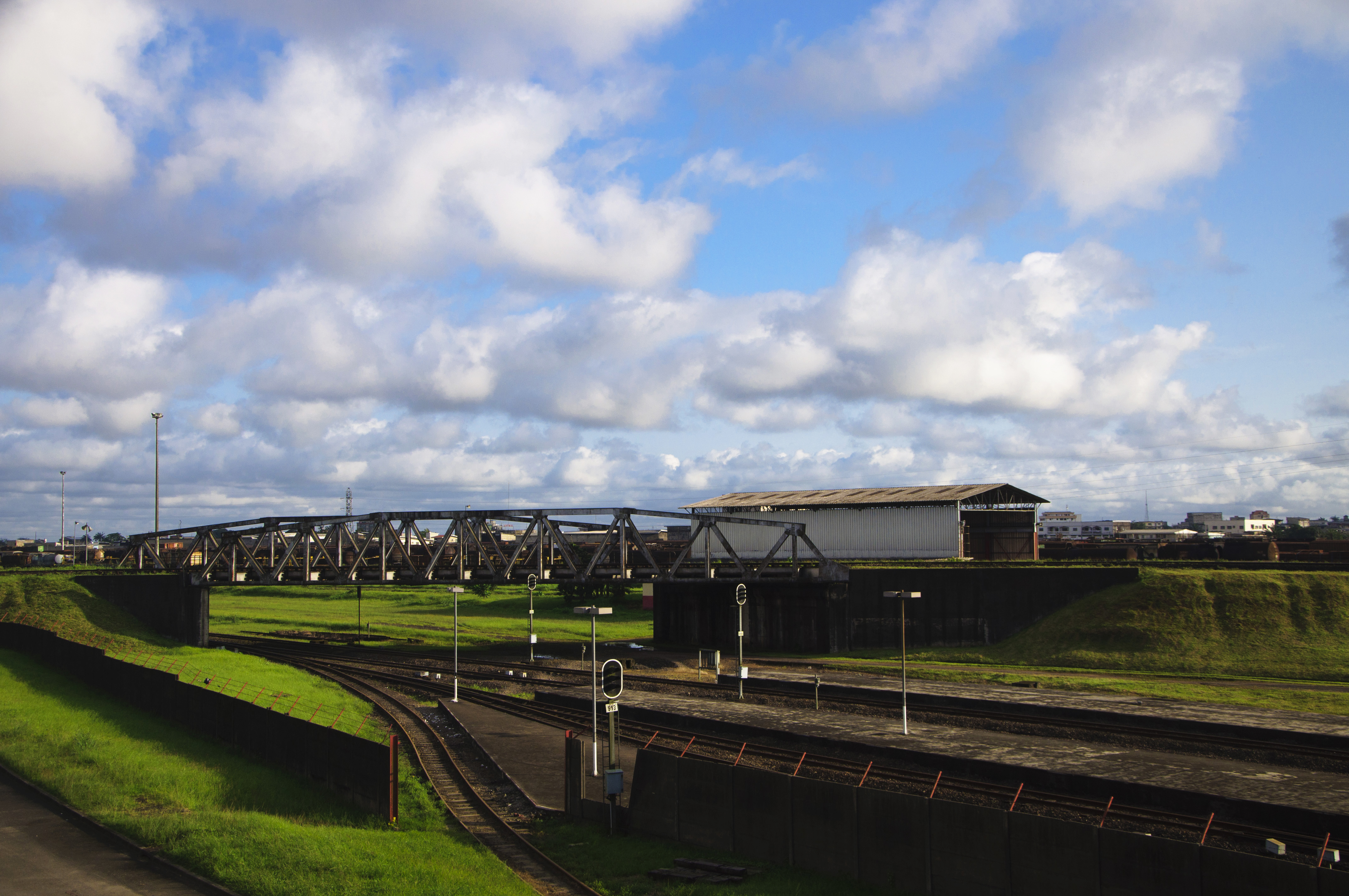
Bessengue railway station

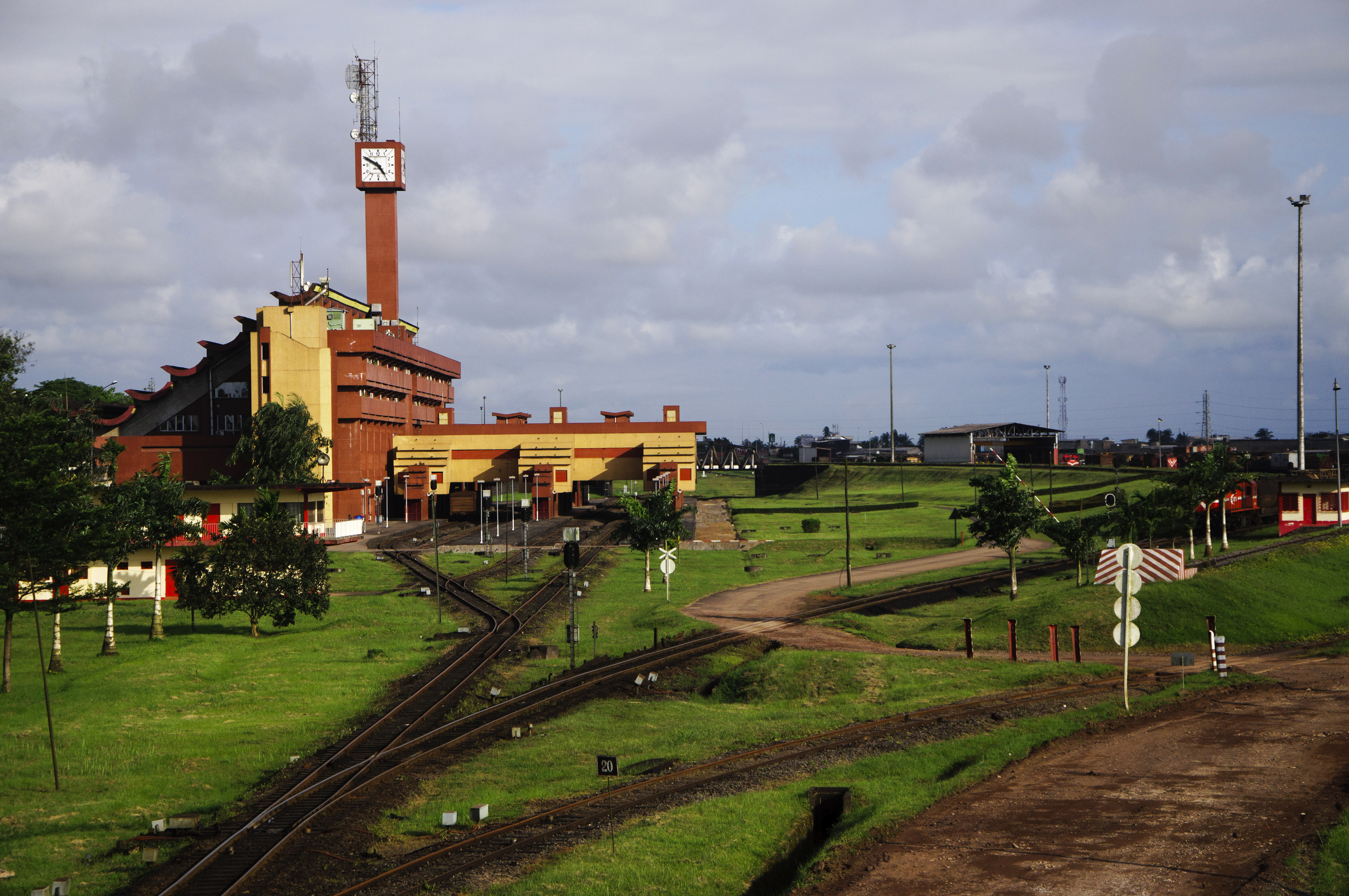
Buildings at Bessengue Railway Station

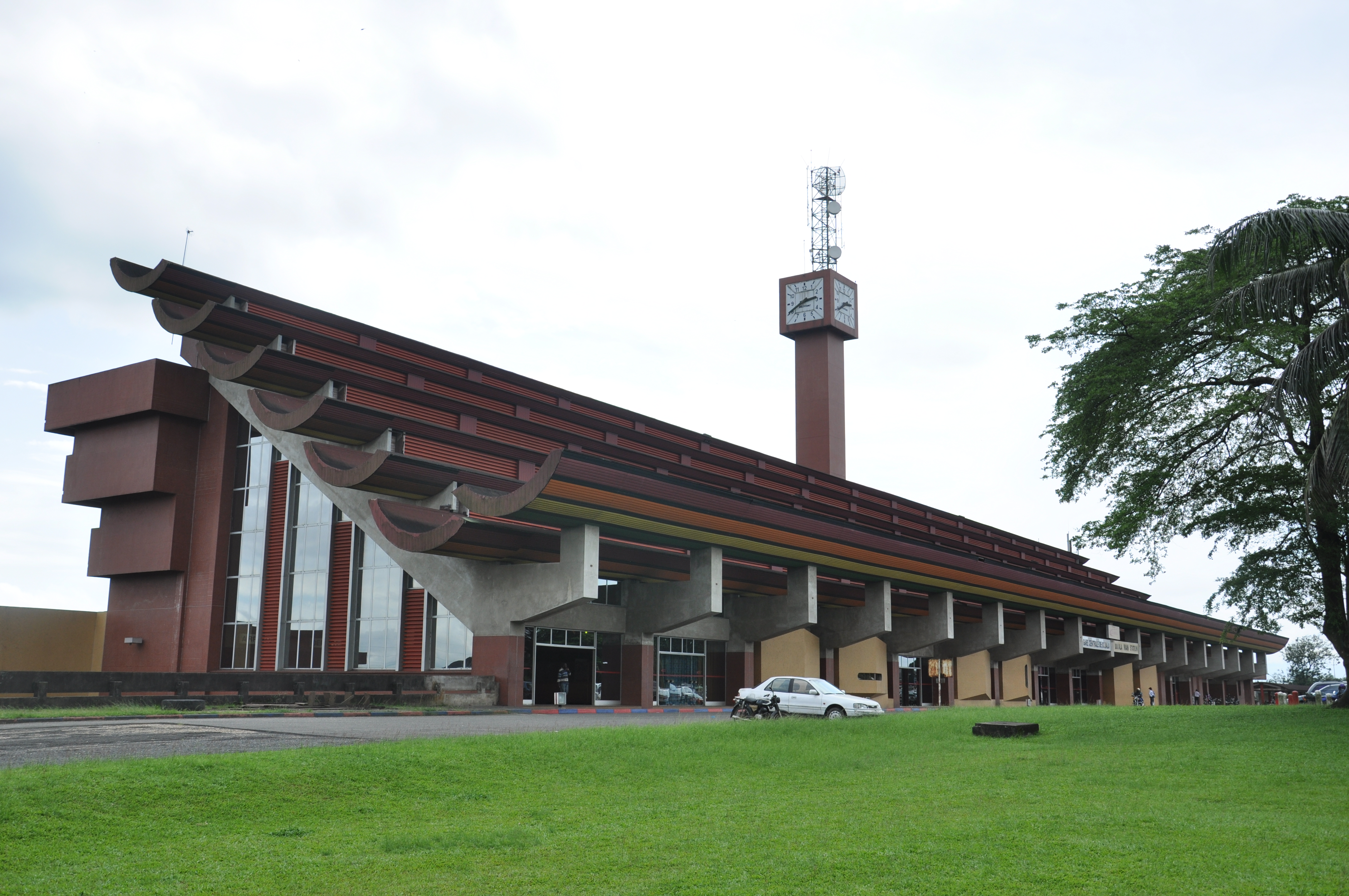
Clock at Bessengue Railway Station

There are diesel depots at Douala-Bassa, Yaoundé, Bélabo and Ngaoundéré. The two-road

== See also ==
- Rail transport in Cameroon
- Railway stations in Chad
- Cement in Africa
