= Transport in Cameroon =

Different transportation options available in Cameroon. These options are available to citizens and tourists such as railways, roadways, waterways, pipelines, and airlines. These avenues of transport are used by citizens for personal transportation, of goods, and by tourists for both accessing the country and traveling.

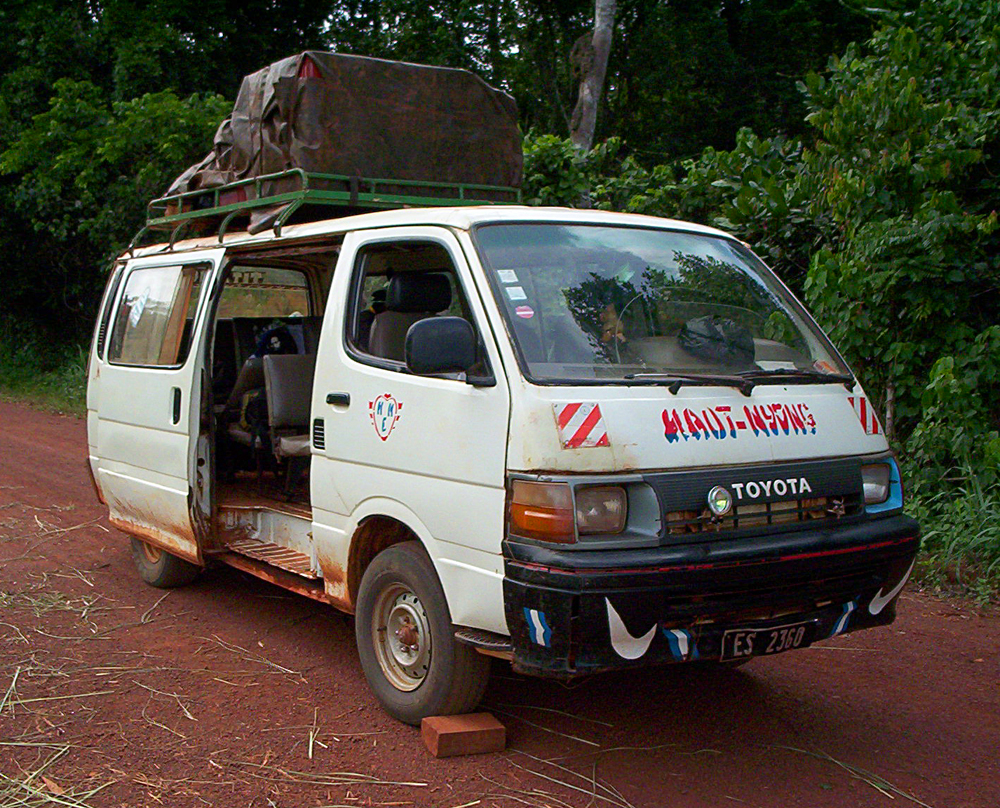
Bush taxi in the East Province

== Railways ==
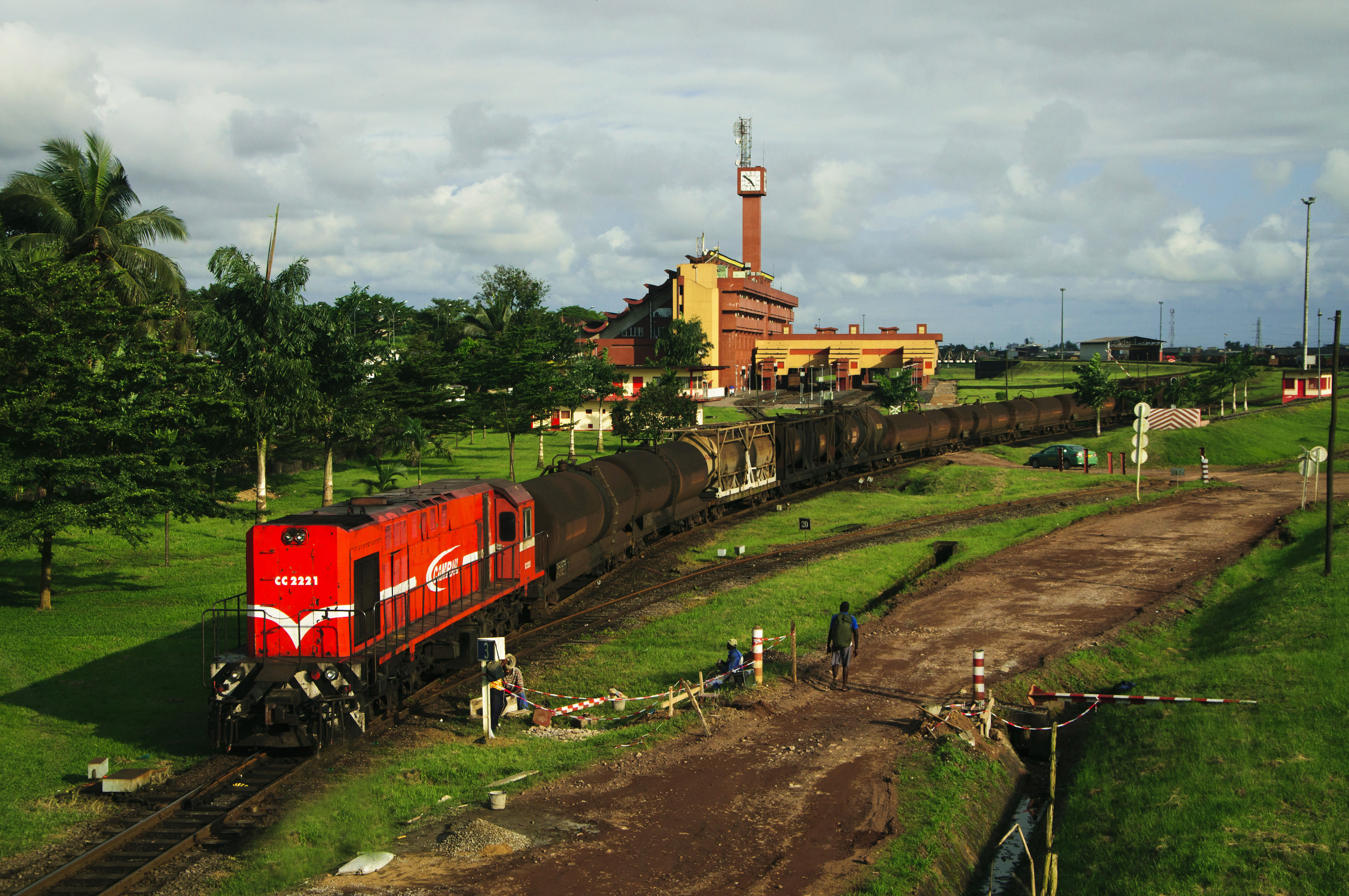

Railways in Cameroon are operated by Camrail, a subsidiary of French investment group Bolloré. As of May 2014, Camrail operated regular daily services on three routes:

- Douala - Kumba
- Douala - Yaoundé
- Yaoundé - Ngaoundéré
- Kribi - Mbalam and Nabeba in Republic of the Congo - under construction in 2022.
- Edéa - Kribi - proposed connection to deep water port.

There are no rail links with neighboring countries except Republic of the Congo.

== Roadways ==
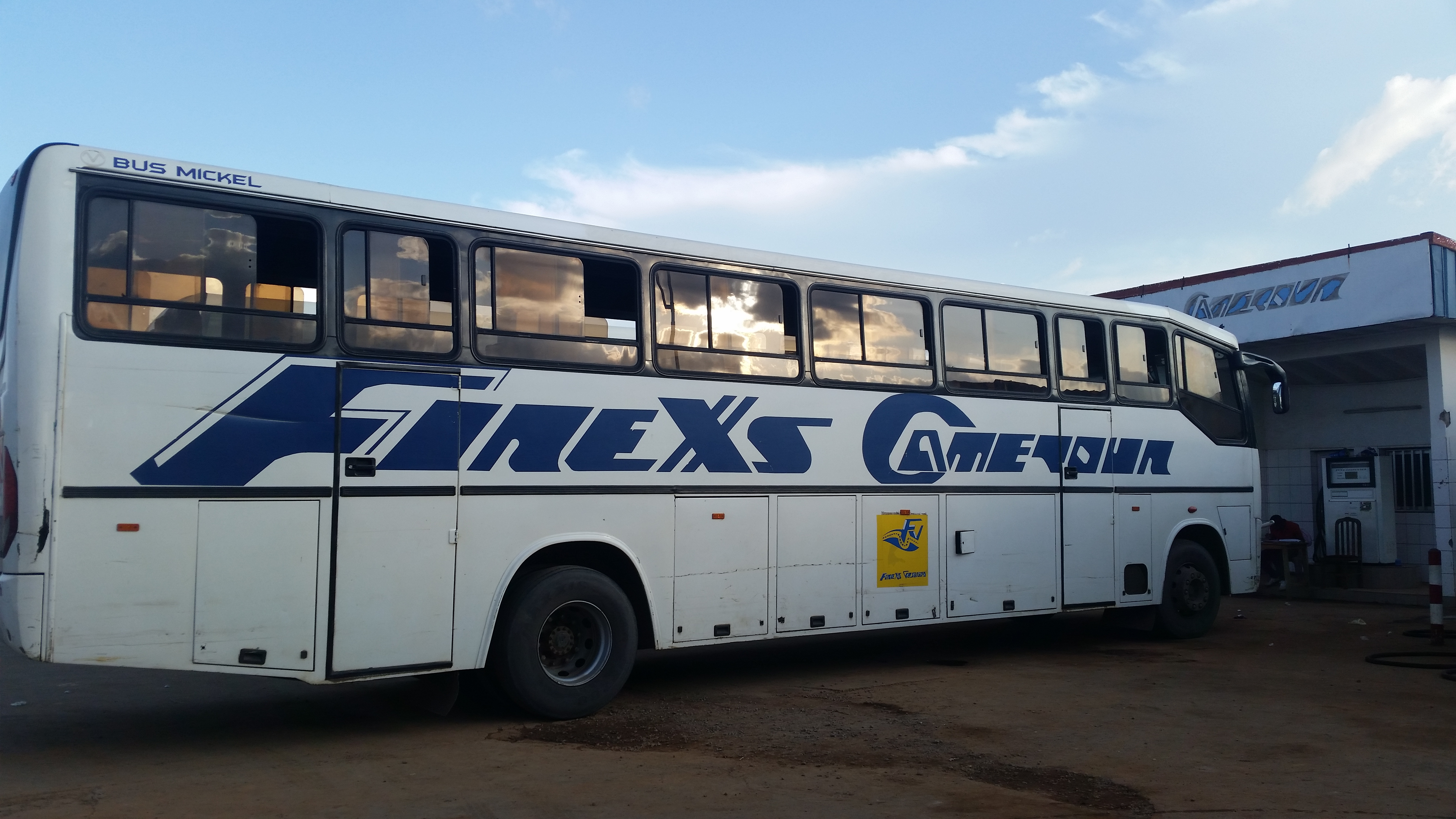
Bus Finexs Voyage

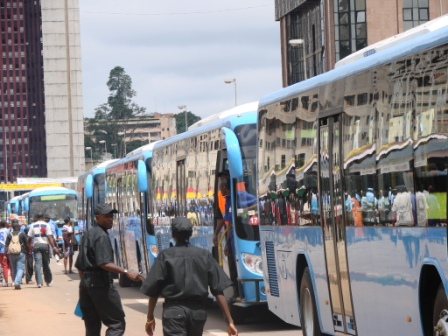
Buses in Yaoundé

As of December 2023 Cameroon’s road network totaled roughly 121,873 km, with about 8.39% paved (~10,576 km). Most rural roads remain unpaved and maintenance is uneven; multiple sources report ongoing road-rehabilitation programs.

Cameroon lies at a key point in the Trans-African Highway network, with three routes crossing its territory:

- Dakar-N'Djamena Highway, connecting just over the Cameroon border with the N'Djamena-Djibouti Highway
- Lagos-Mombasa Highway
- Tripoli-Cape Town Highway

Cameroon's central location in the network means that efforts to close the gaps in the network across Central Africa rely on Cameroon's participation in maintaining the network, and the network has the potential to profoundly influence Cameroon's regional trade. Except for the several relatively good toll roads that connect major cities (all of them one-lane) roads are poorly maintained and subject to inclement weather, since only 10% of the roadways are tarred. It is likely that within a decade, a great deal of trade between West Africa and Southern Africa will be moving on the network through Yaoundé.

National highways in Cameroon:

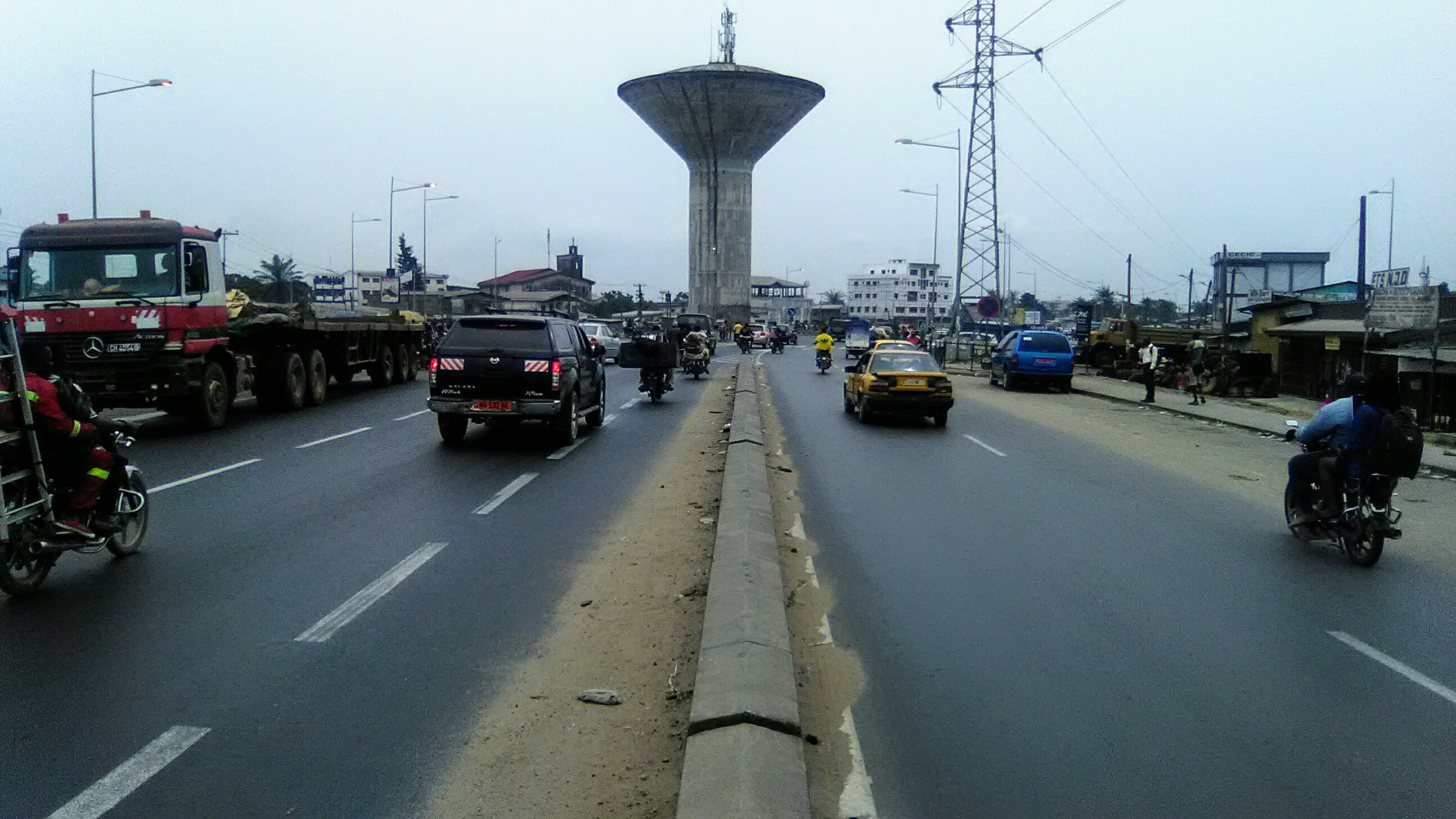
Rues et pistes de Douala 04

- N1: Yaoundé - Bertoua - Ngaoundéré - Garoua - Maroua - Kouséri, border with Chad.
- N2: Yaoundé - Mbalmayo - Ebolowa - Woleu Ntem, border with Gabon.
- N3: Yaoundé - Edéa - Douala - Idenau.
- N4: Yaoundé - Bafia - Bafoussam.
- N5: Douala - Nkongsamba - Bafang - Bafoussam.
- N6: Ejagham, border with Nigeria - Bamenda - Bafoussam - Tibati - Lokoti.
- N7: Edéa - Kribi.
- N8: Mutengene - Kumba - Mamfé.
- N9: Mbalmayo - Nki, border with Congo.
- N10: Yaoundé - Bertoua - Batouri - Kenzou, border with the Central African Republic.
- N11 Bamenda Ring Road Linking, Mezam, Ngokitujia, Mbui, Boyo and Menchum

Prices of petrol rose steadily in 2007 and 2008, leading to a transport union strike in Douala on 25 February 2008. The strike quickly escalated into violent protests and spread to other major cities. The uprising finally subsided on 29 February.

== Waterways ==
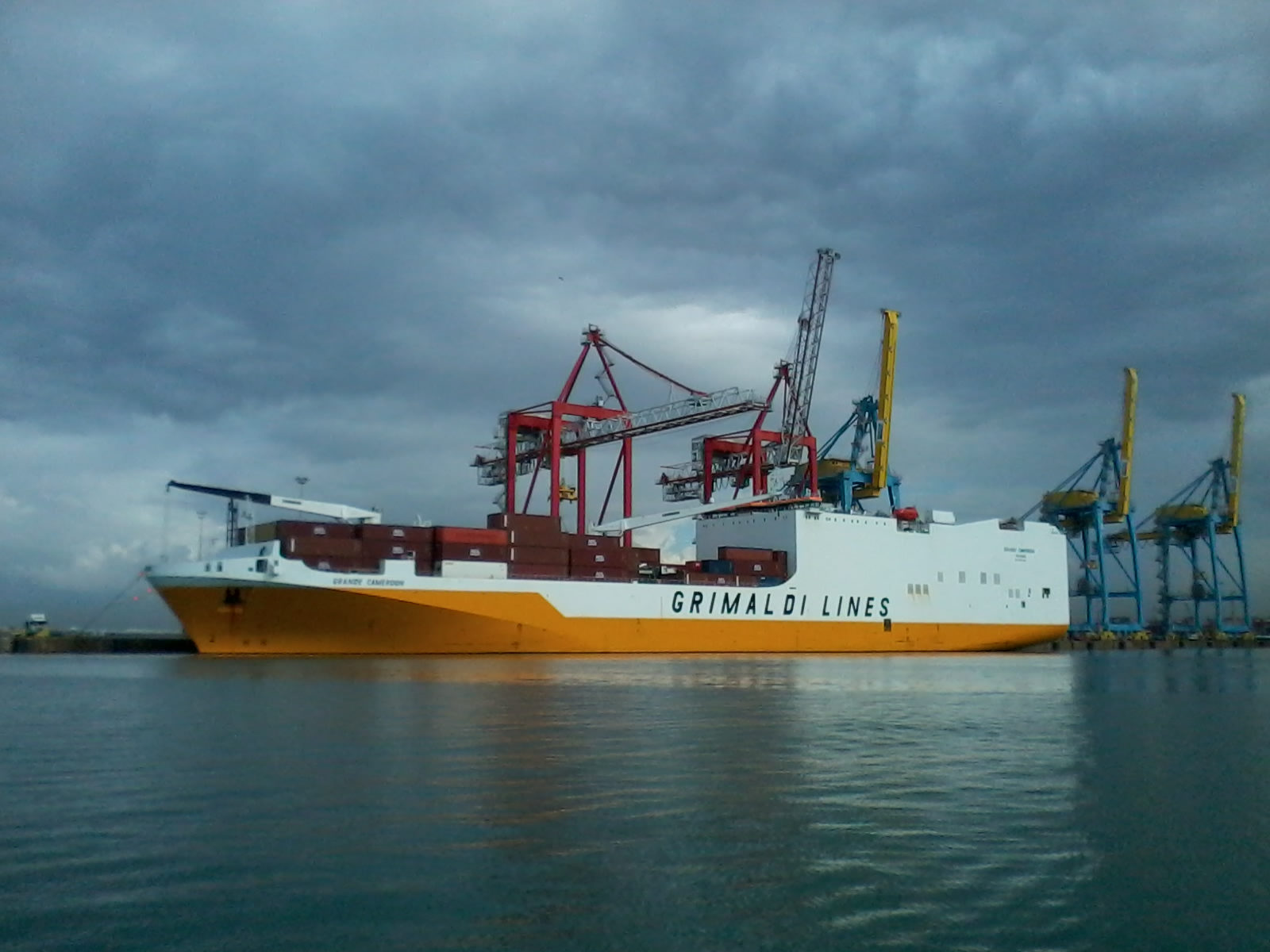
Car carrier GRANDE CAMEROON à Casablanca

2,090 km; of decreasing importance. Navigation mainly on the Benue River; limited during the rainy season.

== Seaports and harbors ==
Cameroon's port and harbors function under the oversight of the National Ports Authority (APN); and is supported by the Port Authority of Douala and the Port Autonome de Kribi

All cargo destined for Cameroon must comply with the Bordereau Électronique de Suivi des Cargaisons (BESC) regulation, an electronic cargo tracking system required for imports. The BESC certificate is issued before shipment and is used by authorities to monitor freight flows and facilitate customs clearance at Cameroonian ports.

As of May 2025, additional documentation is required for Roll-on/roll-off (RO-RO) vehicle shipments when applying for a BESC certificate. Importers must provide proof of registration in the Fichier des Importateurs/Exportateurs (FIMEX) or a valid special import authorization alongside the standard shipping documents.

all of the above operate as members of the International Association of Ports and Harbors (IAPH).

- Douala - main port, railhead, and second-largest city
- Bonaberi - railhead to northwest
- Garoua
- Kribi - oil pipeline from Chad
  - Kribi South - proposed iron ore export port, about 40 km south of Kribi.
- Tiko

== Pipelines ==
888 km of oil line (2008)

== Airports ==
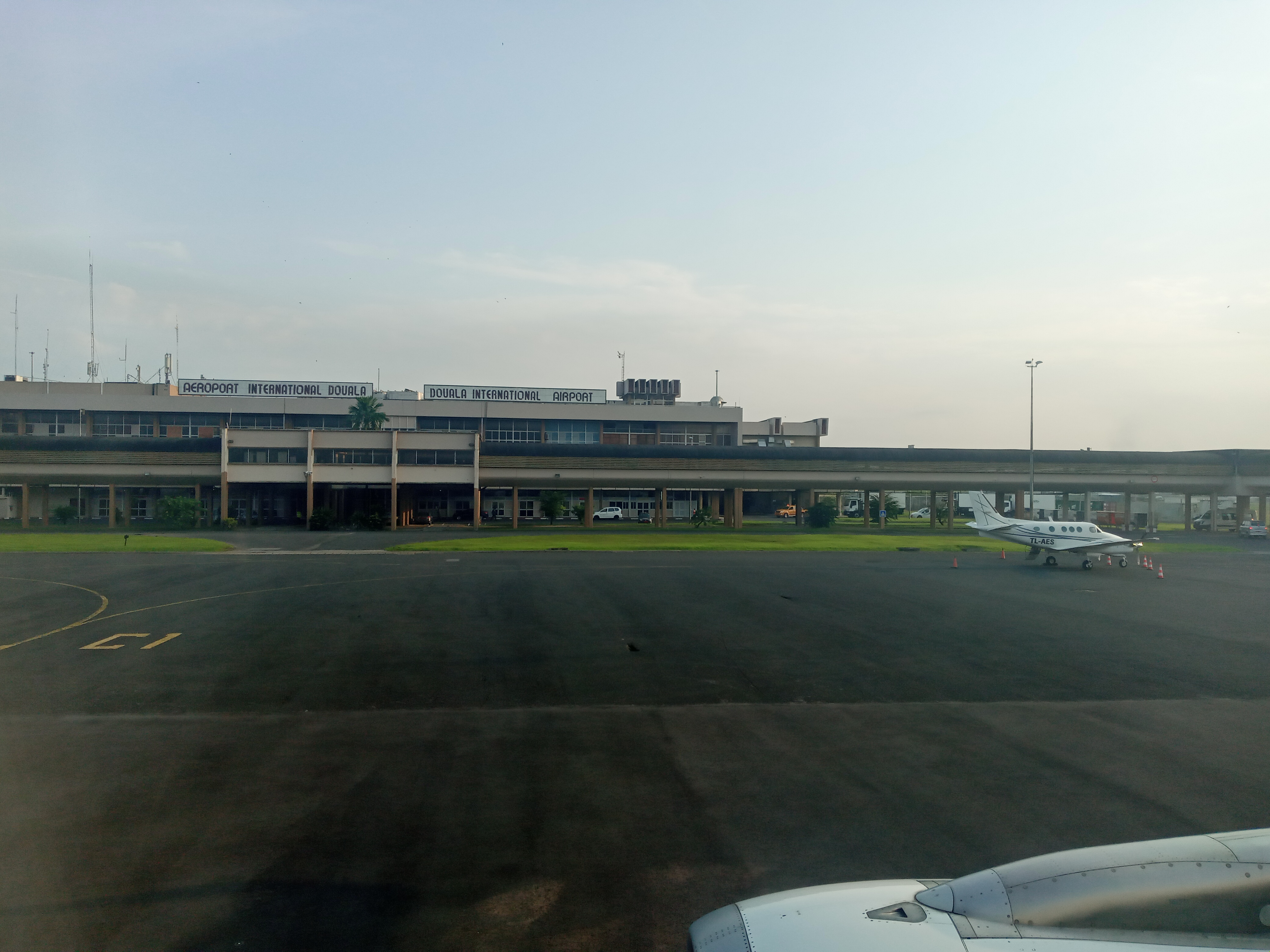
Aéroport de Douala

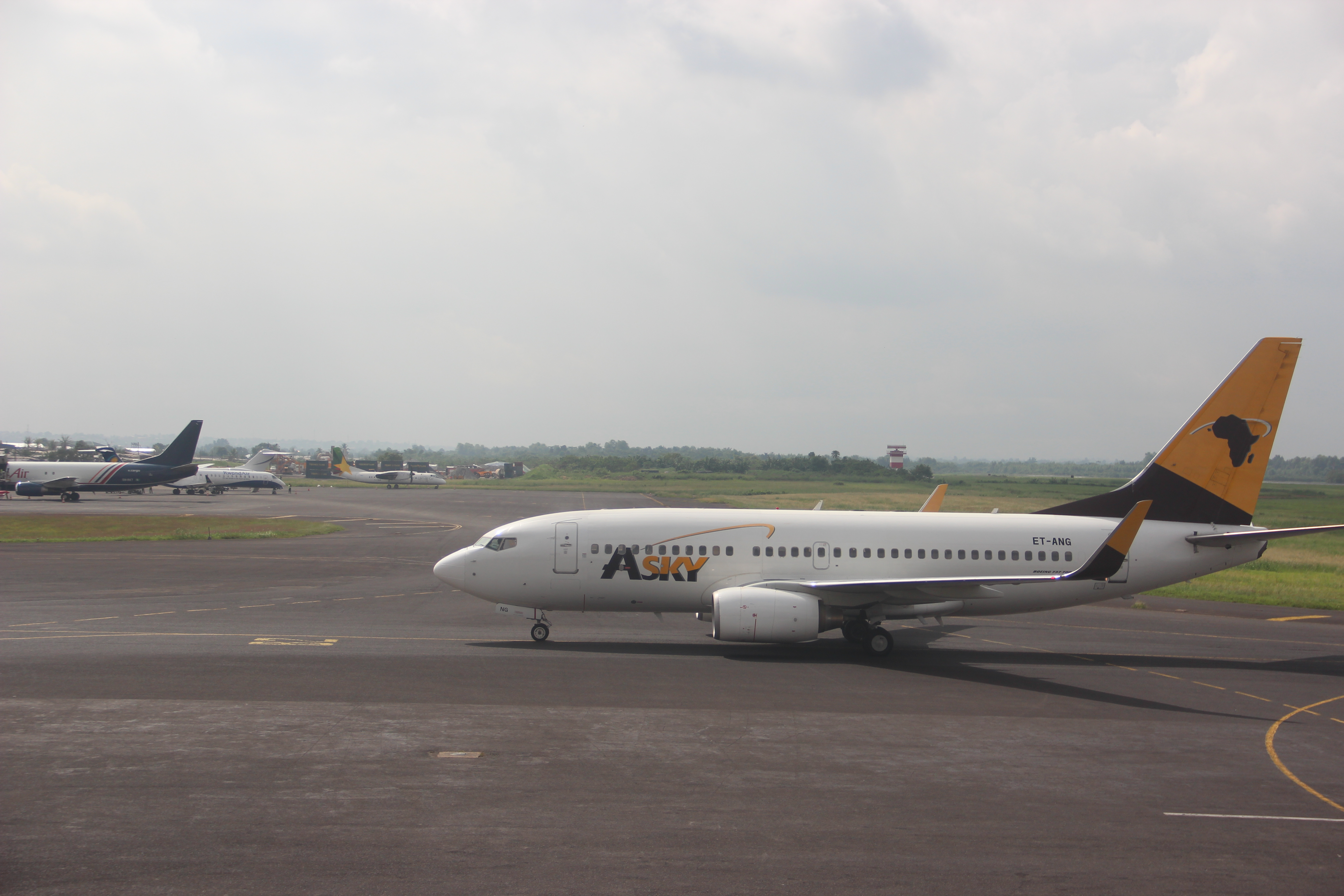
Aircraft at the Douala International Airport, Cameroon

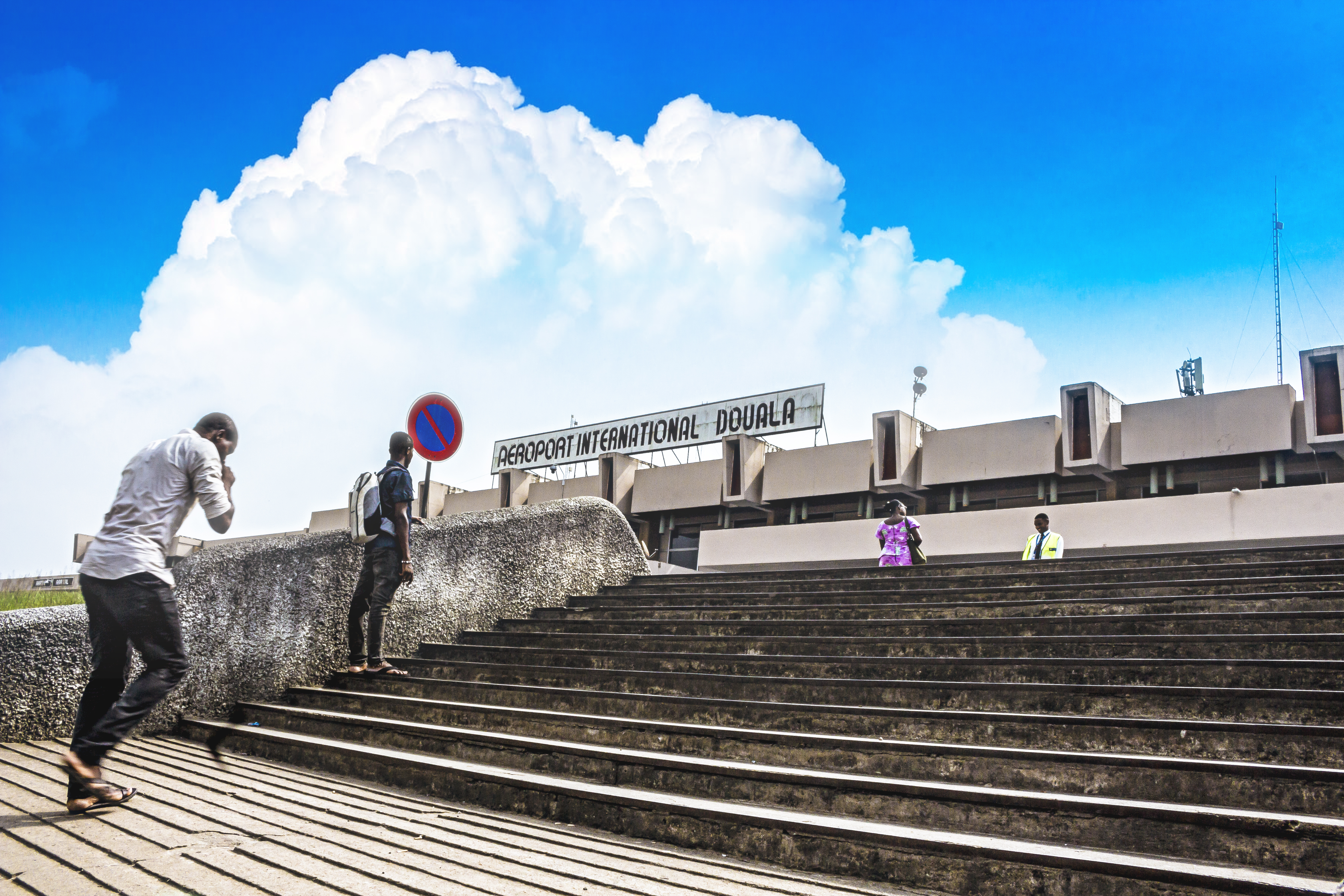
Front view of Douala International Airport

The main international airport is the Douala International Airport and a secondary international airport at Yaoundé Nsimalen International Airport. As of May 2014, Cameroon had regular international air connections with nearly every major international airport in West and Southwest Africa and several connections to Europe and East Africa.

In 2008 there were 34 airports, only 10 of which had paved runways.

- List of airports in Cameroon

=== Airports - with paved runways ===
total: 10
over 3,047 m: 2
2,438 to 3,047 m: 4
1,524 to 2,437 m: 3
914 to 1,523 m: 1 (2008)

=== Airports - with unpaved runways ===
total: 24
1,524 to 2,437 m: 4
914 to 1,523 m: 14
under 914 m: 6 (2008)

== See also ==
- Camrail
- Cameroon
- African Integrated High Speed Railway Network (AIHSRN)
- Railway stations in Cameroon
