= Mbalam =

- Location in Cameroon
- Coordinates: 02.2167°N 13.8167°E
- Country: Cameroon
- Province: East Province

Mbalam is a place in Cameroon near the southern border with the Republic of the Congo where there are significant deposits of iron ore. The mining company is Sundance Resources Limited.

== Namesakes ==
There are two other places in Cameroon with the same name.

== Railway ==
A 510 km standard gauge railway connection to a deepwater port is required to exploit these ore deposits efficiently. Several routes were planned using Quantm software. The railway will start at an elevation of about 650m at the mine, proceed along a fairly level alignment for 350 km, drops steeply for 100 km down to the coastal plain, then traverses that plain for 50 km to the port. The gradients generally favour loaded trains.

In September 2010, Sundance Resources signed a memorandum of understanding with CRCC China-Africa Construction Ltd, which outlined construction plans for a 490 km railway linking the planned iron ore mines to a proposed port near Kribi. Another Chinese company, China Harbour Engineering Co Ltd (CHEC), will build the port.

A two-stage development of a mine, railway and port for the cross-border iron ore deposits in Cameroon and Congo is estimated to cost US$7.7 billion.

== Traffic ==
The new railway is expected to carry 35 million tonnes of ore per year for 25 years.

== See also ==
- Railway stations in Cameroon
