= Tikar people =

Ethnic group in Cameroon

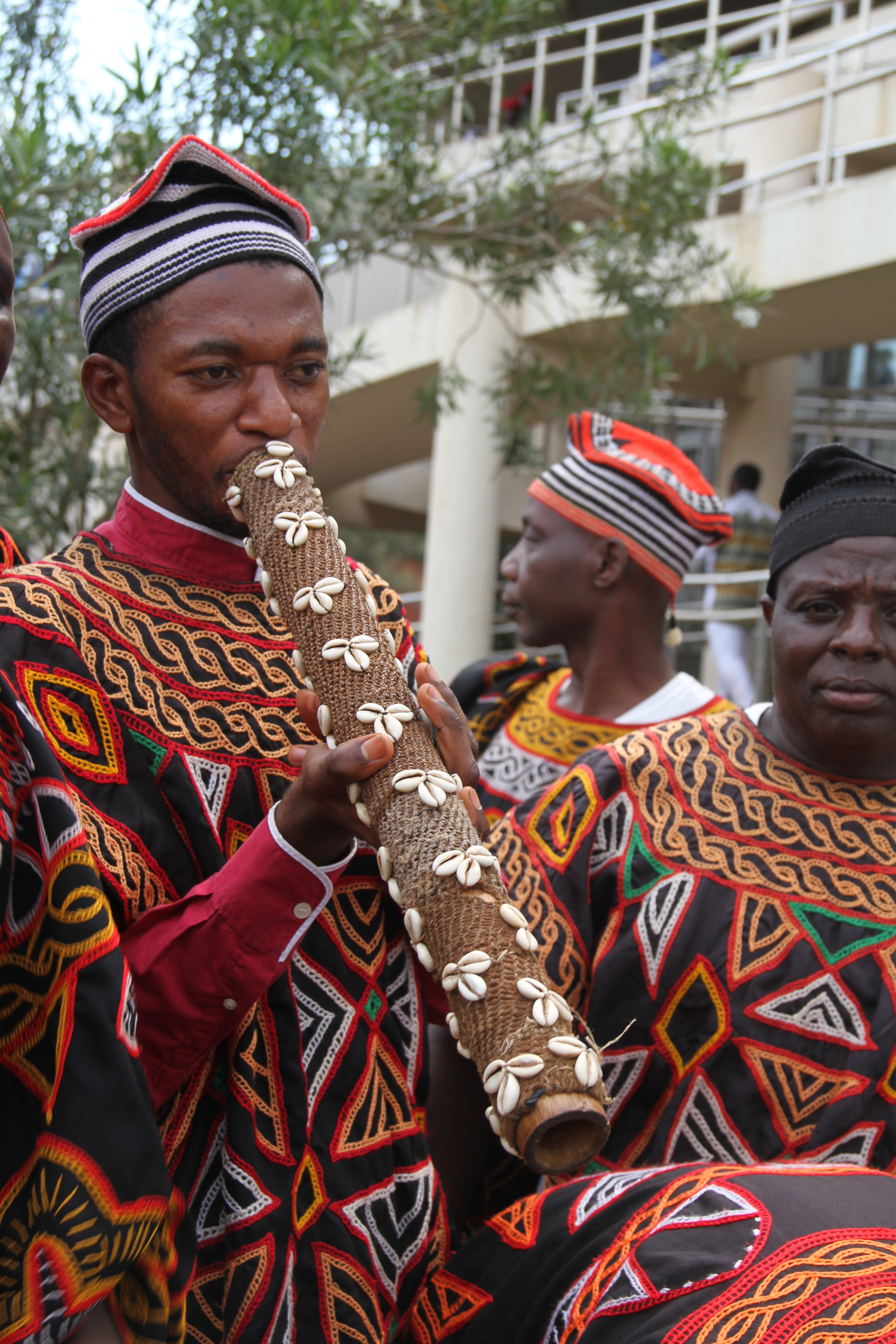
- A Tikar man (wearing Toghu cloth) plays the end-blown horn, a traditional instrument from the Northwest Region of Cameroon

Regions with significant populations
- Northwest Region of Cameroon

Languages
- Tikar • Grassfields languages • English • French

Religion
- 65% Christianity; 25% Traditional central African religions; 10% Islam

Related ethnic groups
- Bafut • Bamileke • Bamum • Kom • Nso

The Tikar (formally known as Tikari, Tigar, Tigari, and Tigre throughout their history) are a Central African ethnic group in Cameroon. They are known to be great artists, artisans and storytellers. Once a nomadic people, some oral traditions trace the origin of the Tikar people to the Nile River Valley in present-day Sudan. Such ethnic groups were referred to in the 1969 official statistics as "Semi-Bantus" and "Sudanese Negroes." They speak a Northern Bantoid language called Tikar. One of the few African ethnic groups to practice a monotheistic traditional religion, the Tikar refer to God the Creator by the name Nyuy. They also have an extensive spiritual system of ancestral reverence.

Grassfields ethnic groups make up approximately 9.9% of Cameroon's population. This could be due to the high number of Tikar people who were kidnapped and sold into slavery in the Americas. The Bamum people and other ethnic groups have also asserted their link to the Tikar people through Tikar rulers in the Kingdom of Bamum. However, the Kom, Nso, Bamum, Ndop-Bamunka, and Bafut peoples are the only ethnic groups that anthropologists and historians believe have a legitimate claim to Tikar lineage.

There are currently six adjoining Tikar kingdoms: Bankim (Kimi), Ngambé-Tikar, Kong (Nkong/Boikouong), Nditam (Bandam), Ngoumé, and Gâ (Ntchi). The boundaries of these kingdoms have remained since German colonizers arrived in Cameroon.

== Etymology ==
During the reign of Sultan Njoya, ruler of the Kingdom of Bamum, French missionary and translator Henri Martin documented that the Bamum people translated the word Tikar as "those who wander".

Today, there is ongoing debate about whether the Tikar should be considered a distinct ethnic group, like the Hausa people, or if the term serves as a general label for multiple groups. Some smaller communities assert that they descend from the Tikar people. Although these claims are heavily contested, one ethnic group in modern Cameroon identifies as Tikar and is recognized as directly descending from the original Tikar people.

Debates persist regarding the broader use of the term Tikar/Tikari to designate many villages and towns in northwestern Cameroon. Additionally, some ethnic groups in the region claim Tikar descent through royal bloodlines. However, oral traditions and DNA testing conducted by companies such as African Ancestry, Inc. have demonstrated that these groups are genetically distinct. While some individuals receive Tikar of Cameroon results, others are identified as Bamileke of Cameroon.

The Bamum and other groups have also asserted connections to the Tikar people through Tikar rulers of the Kingdom of Bamum. According to Molefi Kente Asante, the "Bamum and the Tikar are renowned as great artists who create monumental sculptures of bronze and beads. Cultural exchanges between the Tikar and the Bamum have enriched both groups. For instance, the Bamum adopted numerous words from the Tikar language, as well as from other languages, including Bafanji, Bamali, and Bambalang." Anthropologists have also noted cultural similarities between the Tikar and the Bamum. E. M. Chilver and Phyllis Mary Kaberry suggested that claims of Tikar ancestry by smaller Grassfields groups may often be political in nature.

Small communities of Hausa people in Cameroon also identify as Tikar. Groups claiming descent from Tikar fondoms include the Bambili, Oku, Kom, Bum, Bafut, Nso, Mbiame, Wiya, Tang, War, Mbot, Mbem, Fungom, Weh, Mmen, Bamunka, Babungo, Bamessi, Bamessing, Bambalang, Bamali, Bafanji, Baba (Papiakum), Bangola, Big Babanki, Babanki Tungo, Nkwen, and Bambui. However, anthropologists and historians generally agree that only the Kom, Nso, Bamum, Ndop-Bamunka, and Bafut peoples have credible claims to Tikar ancestry.

== Origin ==
Oral tradition asserts that the Tikar people originally inhabited the Nile River valley in present-day Sudan. Some sources further claim that the ancestors of the Tikar migrated from the Kingdom of Kush. For reasons that remain unclear—possibly war or famine—the Tikar settled in Cameroon, where they established several kingdoms throughout history. Upon their arrival, they were perceived as "Sudanese conquerors," transforming northern-central Cameroon and earning recognition for their ironmaking expertise.

Professor and social anthropologist David Zeitlyn analyzed Tikar origin theories proposed by various historians, including Eldridge Mohammadou, who researched the history of central Cameroon and Tikar-speaking groups. Zeitlyn noted that "the main question at issue is the origin of the founders of the dynasties and the palace institutions of the different Tikar-speaking groups. How much credit is to be given to claims of Mbum origin? To answer this, a variety of evidence must be considered, including oral tradition and historical linguistics." While some researchers argue there is no evidence that the Tikar ever lived along the Nile, others contend that there is also no evidence to disprove it. These opposing views, supported by oral traditions and the overall uncertainty of Tikar origins, underscore the need for further exploration.

Eldridge Mohammadou hypothesized that Tikar kingdoms were established by invaders from the Bare-Chamba group, who overthrew local Mbum rulers in the 18th century. According to him, the term Tikar originally referred to the political and military elite of these invaders. Mohammadou also suggested that the Mbum were the region's original inhabitants and spread their culture and language through peaceful interactions and trade. However, Zeitlyn identified several issues with Mohammadou's arguments, including the lack of concrete evidence for Bare-Chamba invasions, confusion between groups with similar names, and insufficient consideration of oral traditions and linguistic evidence.

Zeitlyn also questioned Mohammadou's claim that the Bamum history diverges significantly from that of Claude Tardits, who argued that the Bamum resulted from a gradual process of cultural and political integration rather than a sudden conquest. Zeitlyn compared Mohammadou's conclusions with those of Jean Hurault, who attributed regional change primarily to the influence of the Fulbe, rather than the Bare-Chamba.

== History ==
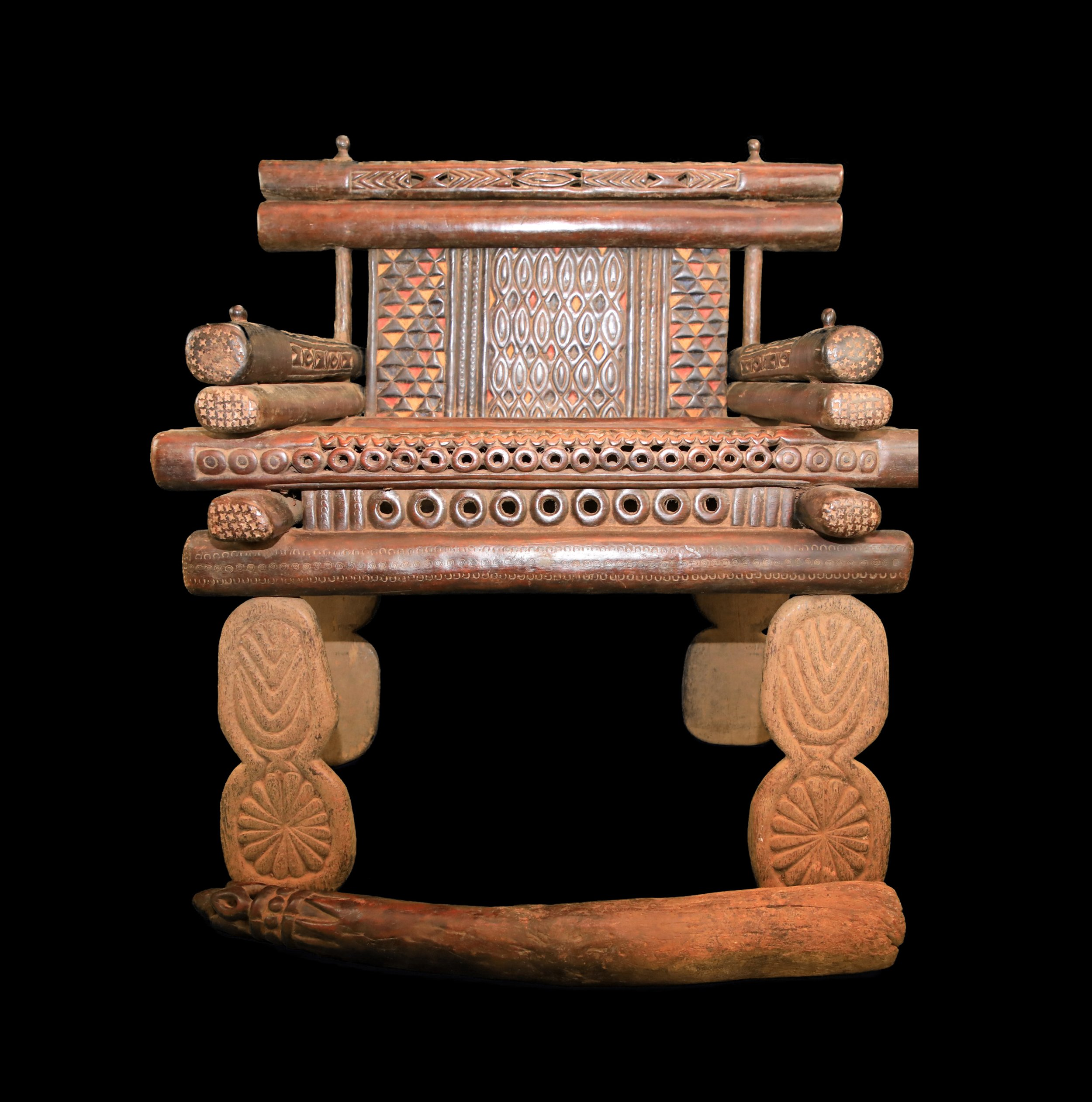
Tikar Throne, Tikar Bamum artist, wooden, 42' high; 27" deep, 38" wide. Photo by Bruno Kemayou. Released by David W. Reed, PhD.

According to Mbum oral tradition, after migrating and settling in the Far North Region of Cameroon, the Mbum ancestors of the Tikar people were ruled by Nya Sana. Little is known about his reign, but oral accounts state that a royal lineage emerged from Nya Sana, eventually producing Took Gokor. Another Mbum Fon (king) and Yesum or Yelaa (queen consort) are credited with founding the Kingdom of Nganha. Their daughter, Princess Wou-Ten (also called Betaka or Belaka), is said to have left her parents' kingdom, traveling to the Adamawa Region, where she established the Kingdom of Tinkala. This is recognized as the first official Tikar fondom (dynasty), and she is believed to have ruled the Tikar people as Fon from 1201 to 1246.

=== Founding of Tikar kingdoms ===
In the late 14th century, two Tikar brothers, Tinki and Guié, founded two autonomous Tikar kingdoms: the Kingdom of Bankim (also called Kimi) at Rifum, and the Kingdom of Ngambé-Tikar. These lineages gave rise to Tikar princes and princesses who embarked on significant migrations, creating new dynasties.

In the first wave of migrations, Prince Ncharé (also called Njáré) founded the Kingdom of Bamum, Princess N'Gouen (also called Nguonso) established the Kingdom of Nso (also called Banso), and Prince Doundje established the Kingdom of Nditam (also called Bandam), ruling alongside Queen Mother Nduingnyi. Later Prince Kpo departed Nditam to found the Kingdom of Ngoumé, and Prince G'Batteu created the Kingdom of Gâ.

In the second wave of migration, Prince Mbli left Bankim to establish the Kingdom of Kong, while Prince Indie and Prince Ouhin migrated south, founding the villages of We and Ina, respectively. However, these settlements never developed into full-fledged kingdoms.

=== Alternate oral tradition ===
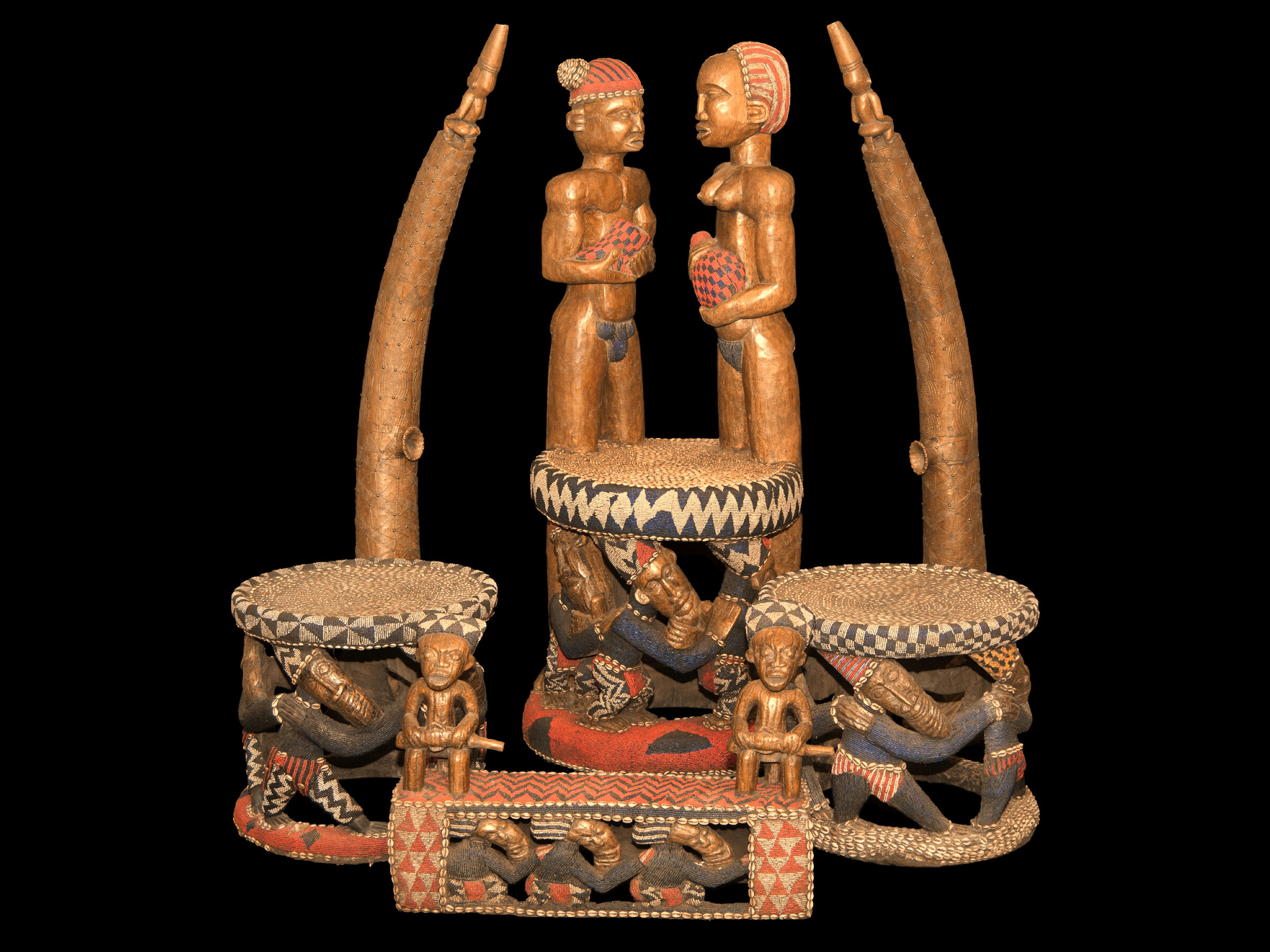
Madou-Yenou thrones commissioned by the Tikar chieftaincy of Rifum, crafted by Njikam Isidore, grandson of Nji Gbetom Salifou. Two thrones were made simultaneously as a customary precaution.

An alternate account suggests that Chief Tinki eventually became Fon and ruled until his death in 1387, which triggered a series of violent battles for the throne at Rifum. Ultimately, his son Mveing ascended to the throne, ruling until 1413. However, many believed that Tinki's other son, Nchare Yen, was the rightful heir. In this version, Nchare Yen, along with his siblings Mbe (also called Morunta) and Ngonnso (or Nguonso), fled Rifum fearing for their lives. The siblings parted ways at Mbam: Mbe traveled east to found the Kingdom of Nditam at Bandam, while Ngonnso went west to establish the Nso Kingdom at Kumbo.

=== Bamum connection ===
Fon Nchare Yen established the Kingdom of Bamum at Foumban in the late 14th or early 15th century. According to King Idrissou (Ibrahim) Mborou Njoya, a later Bamum ruler named Manju bestowed the Bamum people with their name. As the kingdom expanded, Foumban became its capital, and the Bamum Kingdom emerged as one of the largest in Cameroon's grasslands. Both the kingdom and its capital are believed to be named after Nchare Yen's mother, Mfoumban.

Despite the historical ties between the Bamum and Tikar peoples, they are considered distinct ethnic groups today.

=== Impact of the Atlantic slave trade ===
During the 18th and 19th centuries, the Tikar people suffered devastating losses due to the Atlantic slave trade. Chamba and Fulani slave traffickers, drawn by the Tikar's prosperous iron-working and mask-making industries, targeted the Tikar population. While many enslaved Cameroonians and Nigerians were shipped from the Bight of Biafra, significant numbers of Tikar and Duala were sold upriver to Sierra Leone and downriver to Angola. From there, they were transported to the Americas. Records indicate that Tikar captives constituted a significant proportion of enslaved Cameroonians brought to the Americas, contributing to the steep decline of the Tikar population in Africa. Despite this, the remaining Tikar preserved their heritage through oral tradition and sustained their cultural practices.

== Geography ==
There are currently six adjoining Tikar kingdoms: Bankim (Kimi), Ngambé-Tikar, Kong, Nditam (Bandam), Ngoumé, and Gâ. The boundaries of these kingdoms have remained since German colonizers arrived in Cameroon. Today, the Tikar people inhabit the Adamawa Region and certain regions of Bamenda Province. The Northwest is composed of the Fungum, Bum, and Kom. The Northeast is composed of Mbem, Mbaw, Wiya, War and Tang. The Southeast is composed of Banso (Nsaw), Ndop and Bafut.

== Languages ==
The Tikar people, speak a Northern Bantoid, semi-Bantu language called Tikar, which is hypothesized to be a divergent language in the Niger-Congo language family. The Tikar language (also called Tigé, Tigré or Tikari) has four regional dialects, including Túmú, which spoken in Bankim and Nditam. Linguist Roger Blench stated that the Tikar language and other Bantuoid languages belong to a branch of the Niger-Congo family related to but distinct from Bantu, and do not have a classical Bantu noun-class system. They also speak a host of other Grassfield languages across the Bamenda Plateau.

== Genetics ==
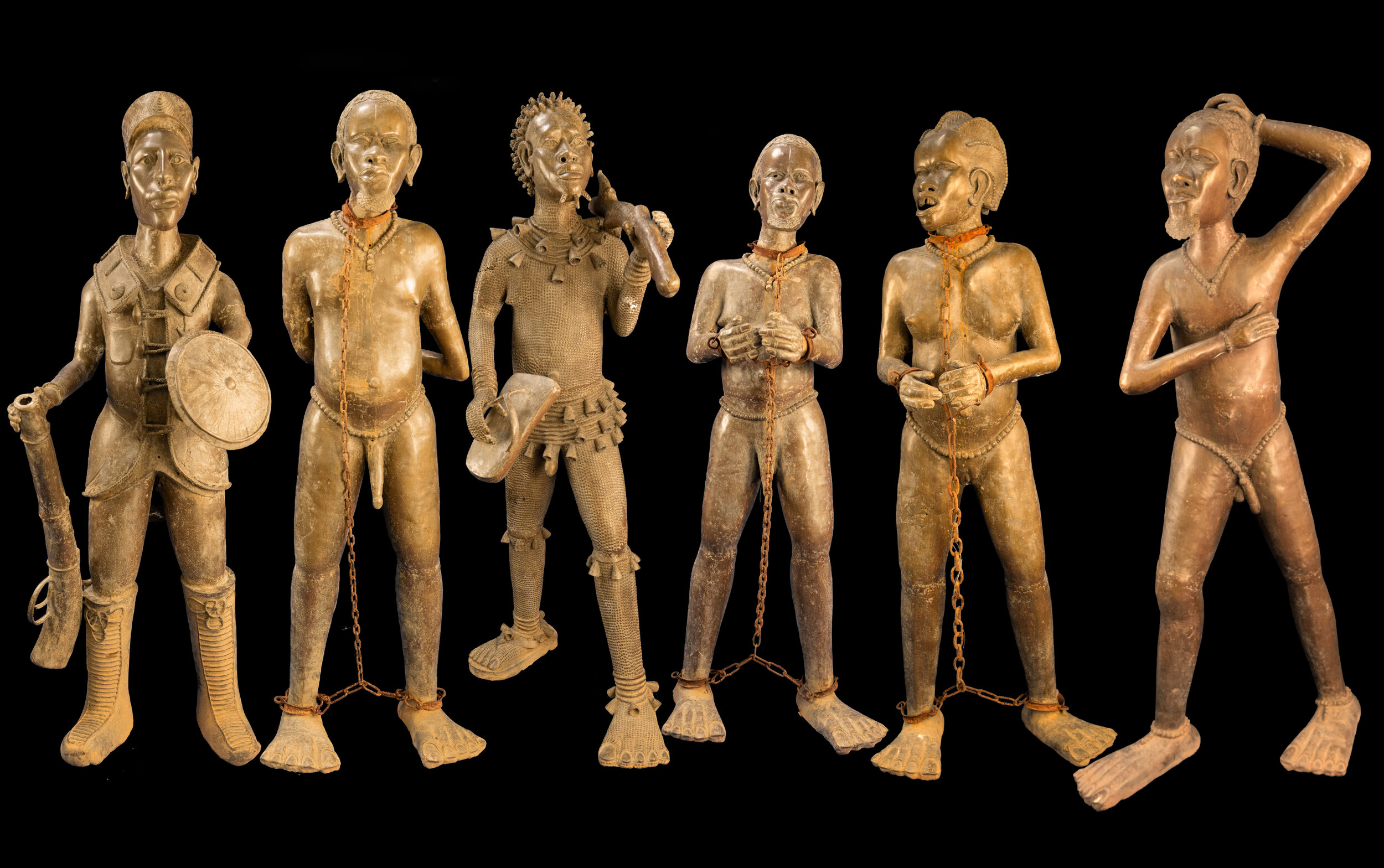
Bronze figurines of four enslaved Tikar being marched by a Moorish colonial guard and a Mboum royal guard toward the coast to be exported to the Americas, by Nji Gbetkom Salifou, a Bamoun sculptor from Cameroon's Grasslands, 1946–1950. Photo by Bruno Kemayou. Released by Chief Mongbet Vessah Ibrahim and David W. Reed, PhD.

Genetic testing found that many Tikar belong to Haplogroup L3e1, which is also prevalent in Madagascar, Angola, Yemen, and the Canary Islands. The L3e haplogroup is believed to have an origin "in the Central Africa/Sudan region ~45,000 years ago."

A 2023 study of twelve indigenous African populations across Central, Eastern, and Southern Africa uncovered genomic variants that researchers used to reconstruct admixture events and phylogenetic relationships. The results revealed that the Tikar people have "23% ancestry related to an archaic population that diverged prior to the divergence of all modern human populations (possibly reflecting introgression from an archaic population into modern populations) and 77% ancestry from a population related to the Nilo-Saharan-speaking Mursi" people of Ethiopia. The study also found that "The Fulani derived 50% of their ancestry from a population related to the Amhara and 50% from a population related to the Tikari (consistent with TreeMix results with three migration events)."

A 2010 study showed that the Tikar are a genetic outlier to peoples of Nigeria's Cross River region, Igboland and Ghana, showing significant differences. Similarly, a 2023 study found that self-identified Tikar who live in the Adamawa region and speak the Tikar language belong to a different genetic cluster than the self-identified Tikar who live amongst other Grassfields ethnic groups and do not speak the Tikar language. It concluded that persons from Cameroon and Sudan "showed the greatest reduction in genetic similarity with distance, which remained even after only comparing people belonging to the same ethnic group". The same study found Tikar-related genetic variations amongst the Bakongo people of Democratic Republic of Congo, Bantu ethnic groups in Kenya, the Himba people and Damara people of Namibia, and the Eland Cave Bay remains in South Africa, the latter of which is believed to be more than 3,000 years old.

Through DNA testing with African Ancestry, Inc., founded by geneticist Dr. Rick Kittles and entrepreneur Dr. Gina Paige, people of African descent across the United States, South America and the Caribbean have been able to trace their lineages to the Tikar people of Cameroon. Genetic testing showed that the descendants of these stolen people of the Tikar-Pygmy cluster translocated the mtdna Haplogroup L3 to the Americas when they were forcibly taken. As a result, L3 is fairly common in the United States and Brazil today.

== Culture ==
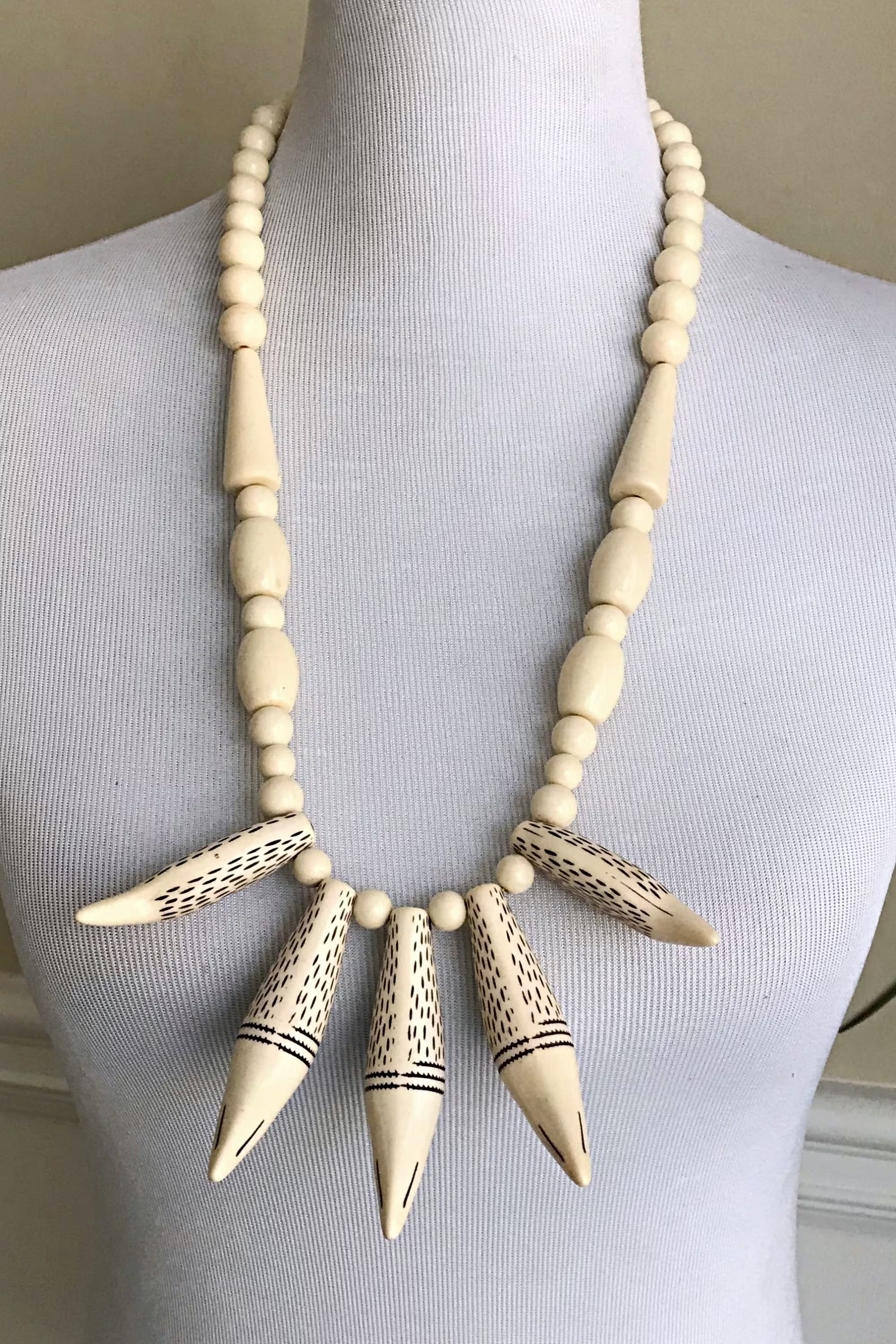
Lion teeth necklace created by the Tikar people

The Tikar are an artistically and culturally significant people. The design of Toghu and Ndop cloth print became a cultural marker of the Tikar and Grassfields peoples, creating a unique style that made them easily distinguishable from other peoples outside of the region. These intricate designs is still used today for clothing, architecture, art and to demarcate royal ritual spaces.

Menang is a traditional dance of the Tikar.

=== Artistry ===
The Tikar are renowned for their highly detailed masks. Their artistry put the Tikar people at the center of trade and politics in Cameroon and made them a force to reckoned with in the eyes of neighboring ethnic groups, especially considering they are thought to be the only people in the region who were skilled in iron-working. Their masks are often characterized by their strongly defined noses and large eyes. They are also known for their beautifully decorated brass pipes. Along with the Bamileke people, the Tikar are also known for their intricate elephant masks, which became renowned in the town Bali.

Tikar horns and trumpets play a significant role in spiritual and cultural ceremonies with each design being purposefully sculpted for a specific event. The same can be said for elaborate grassland palaces, which feature hand-carved pillars supporting the roof overhangs, an ensemble of door posts, lintels and sills framing the entrance, as well as the interior doorways facing the open courtyards.

=== Cultural beliefs ===
Surrounded by great grasslands, the Tikar people developed a unique understanding of nature and performed planting rituals to bless seeds and work implements. Other ethnic groups in the region were known to offer animal sacrifices when it was time to plant.

The Tikar also had their own cultural beliefs regarding birthing. It was once believed that during pregnancy, the blood that the woman would normally release during menstruation forms parts of the fetus. This blood was said to form the skin, blood, flesh and most of the organs. The bones, brain, heart and teeth were believed to be formed from the father's sperm. In the case of a son, the masculinity also came from this.

== Spirituality ==
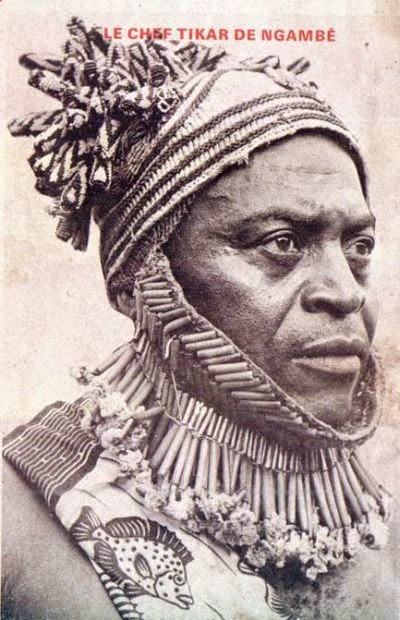
This is a picture of the late fon (king) of Ngambe, one of the Tikar villages. Around his neck is an ivory collar made of elephant tusks. He carries it only once per year, during the time of the festival called "Sweety". It is a traditional Tikar festival during which one calls upon the spirits of the ancestors and asks them to bless the community.

The Tikar people predominantly practice Christianity today. However, there are a small number who practice traditional religions and Islam. Despite the differences between the spiritual practices, the Tikar are known to refer to God the Creator as Nyuy, and the Bamileke people refer to Nyuy as Si. Both groups, along with the other peoples of the Grasslands, believe God requires them to reverence their lineage ancestors. This is pivotal to their spirituality; as they traditionally believed their ancestral spirits were embodied in the skulls of the deceased ancestors and still present.

"The skulls are in the possession of the eldest living male in each lineage, and all members of an extended family recognize the same skulls as belonging to their group. When a family decides to relocate, a dwelling, which must be first purified by a diviner, is built to house the skulls in the new location. Although not all of the ancestral skulls are in the possession of a family, they are not forgotten. These spirits have nowhere to reside, though, and may as a result cause trouble for the family. To compensate when a man's skull is not preserved, a family member must undergo a ceremony involving pouring libations into the ground. Earth gathered from the site of that offering then comes to represent the skull of the deceased. Respect is also paid to female skulls, although detail about such practices is largely unrecorded." -Molefi Kete Asante

Much of Tikar oral tradition speaks of their journey to flee the spread of Islam. After they settled in Cameroon, the Tikar people soon found themselves fleeing northern Cameroon for Adamawa to avoid forced-conversion to by Muslim Fulani invaders, who moved southward into Cameroon to take advantage of the lucrative, west-central trade route. The Tikar then migrated southward to what would become known as the city of Foumban in Northwest Cameroon. Once the Fulani followed to the south, holy war began, forcing some ethnic groups to flee yet again. Others, like the Bamun, remained, hoping to resist Islam. The Fulani conquest was brief and did not result in Islamization, although this faith was accepted by a later Bamum ruler, Sultan Ibrahim Mbouombouo Njoya, in the early 20th century. This created the division between the Bamum and Bafia people.

== Notable people of direct Tikar descent ==
- Naomi Achu, Cameroonian singer of Mendankwe-Nkwen (Bamenda-Nkwen) ethnicity
- Simon Achidi Achu, Cameroonian politician of Bafut ethnicity
- Justin Che, Cameroonian-American footballer of Bafut ethnicity
- Collins Fai, Cameroonian footballer of Nso ethnicity
- Bernard Fonlon, Cameroonian politician and educationist of Nso ethnicity
- John Ngu Foncha, Cameroonian politician of Bamenda-Nkwen ethnicity
- Libianca, Cameroonian-American singer of Bamenda-Nkwen ethnicity
- Magasco, Cameroonian singer of Kom ethnicity
- John Fru Ndi, Cameroonian politician of Bamenda-Nkwen ethnicity
- Ndamukong Suh, Cameroonian-American NFL player of Jamaican and Bamenda-Nkwen descent

== Notable people of distant Tikar ancestry ==
- Anthony Anderson, American actor, comedian, writer, and game show host
- Blair Underwood, American actor
- Condoleezza Rice, American diplomat and political scientist who served as the 66th U.S. Secretary of State
- Don Cheadle, American actor, author, director, producer and writer
- Ebro Darden, American media executive and radio personality
- Flying Lotus, American hip hop producer
- Papoose, American rapper
- Quincy Jones, American music producer
- Sheryl Lee Ralph, American actress, singer, author, and activist
- Sinbad, American stand-up comedian and actor
- Spike Lee, American film director, producer, screenwriter, actor, and professor
- Tasha Smith, American actress, director and producer
- Vanessa E. Williams, American actress and producer
- Vinícius Júnior, Brazilian footballer
- Wanda Sykes, American stand-up comedian, actress, and writer
