= Diko Madeleine =

First wife of Chief Konaka of Somié

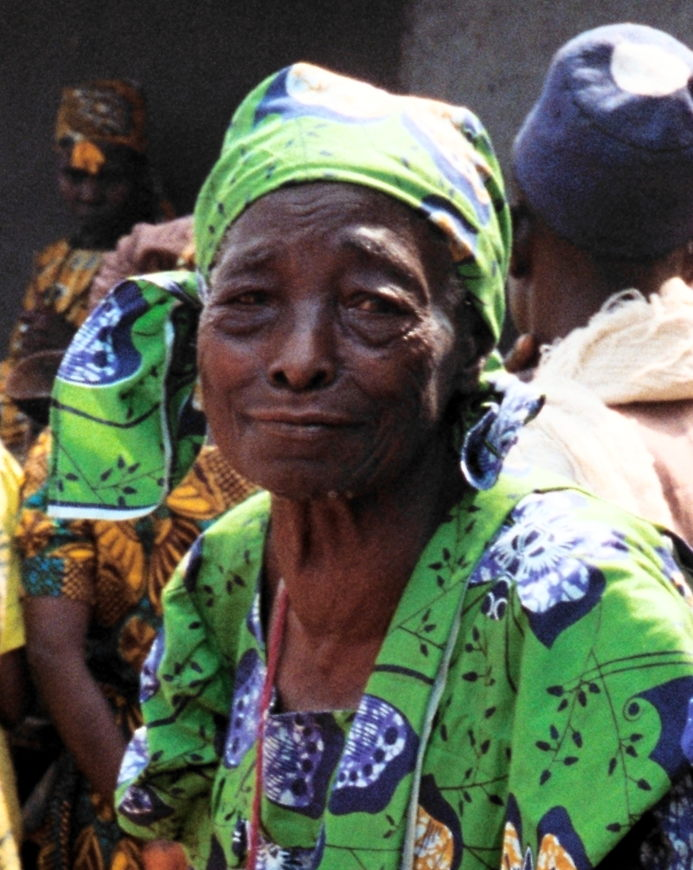
Diko in Jan 1995 during Nggwun

Diko (Dikɔ́ɔ) Madeleine (c. 1910 – 27 January 2005) was the first wife of Chief Konaka of Somié and with him was one of the major actors negotiating the transition to Colonial rule and the introduction of Christianity among Mambila people in Cameroon. Konaka is a variant of Kwunakal (pronounced kwúnákàl), personal name of many figures, including chiefs, in the history of the Mambilla Plateau and the Ndom Plain. Indeed, the particular Konaka discussed above is a descendant of other Kwunakals traceable to the Nyo Heights of the Mambilla Plateau before the descent to Ndom, and the name was successively replicated in the customary Mambilla patronymy. Much of what we know of Chief Konaka of Ndeba (Somie) comes from the writings of David Zeitlyn, although "Kwunakal" was discussed by a few highland-based habitués of Somie who met him in his lifetime.

== Early life ==
Diko Madeleine was born in Chana village around 1910 during the German occupation of Kamerun (Cameroon) in what is now Nigeria. While a young woman in Chana she met and then married a young man, Konaka, who subsequently became chief of Somié, now in Cameroon.

== Career ==
As the first wife of Chief Konaka she had a titled position in the village and was a significant actor in village ritual. She was an extremely influential woman among the Mambila of the Tikar Plain. Diko and Konaka managed the switch from the suzerainty of the Fulani/Fulbe Lamido of Banyo to the post-World War I French administration and the arrival of Christianity.

Diko and Konaka had five sons and two daughters together. When Konaka died in December 1949, His replacement as chief was one of these sons, Ndi. Ndi died in an accident in 1953. By being the first wife of a chief, then the mother of the chief, later still grandmother of the chief Ndi Adam who became chief in 2002, Diko remained an important person in the village, unofficially consulted by senior men including the chiefs. As such, she was an arbiter of Mambila tradition.

== Public recognition ==
In 2003-2004 her life was the subject of a series of lectures (Evans Pritchard Lectures) at All Souls College, Oxford given by David Zeitlyn. Some of the lectures as given are available online and subsequently an article has been published about the background to these lectures and her life.
