= Tapawa-Wawa =

- Coordinates: 6.52°N 11.40°E
- Country: Cameroon
- Region: Adamawa
- Department: Mayo-Banyo

Population (2005)
  - Total: 726

Tapawa-Wawa (also Tappawa-Wawa) is a village in the commune of Banyo in the Adamawa Region of Cameroon. et le département du Mayo-Banyo au Cameroun.

== Population ==
In 1967, Tapawa-Wawa contained 291 inhabitants, mostly Wawa. At the time of the 2005 census, there were 726 people in the village.

== Bibliography ==
- Jean Boutrais, 1993, Peuples et cultures de l'Adamaoua (Cameroun) : actes du colloque de Ngaoundéré du 14 au 16 janvier 1992, Paris : Éd. de l'ORSTOM u.a.
- Dictionnaire des villages de l'Adamaoua, ONAREST, Yaoundé, October 1974, 133 p.
