= Joseph Chila =

Cameroonian photographer

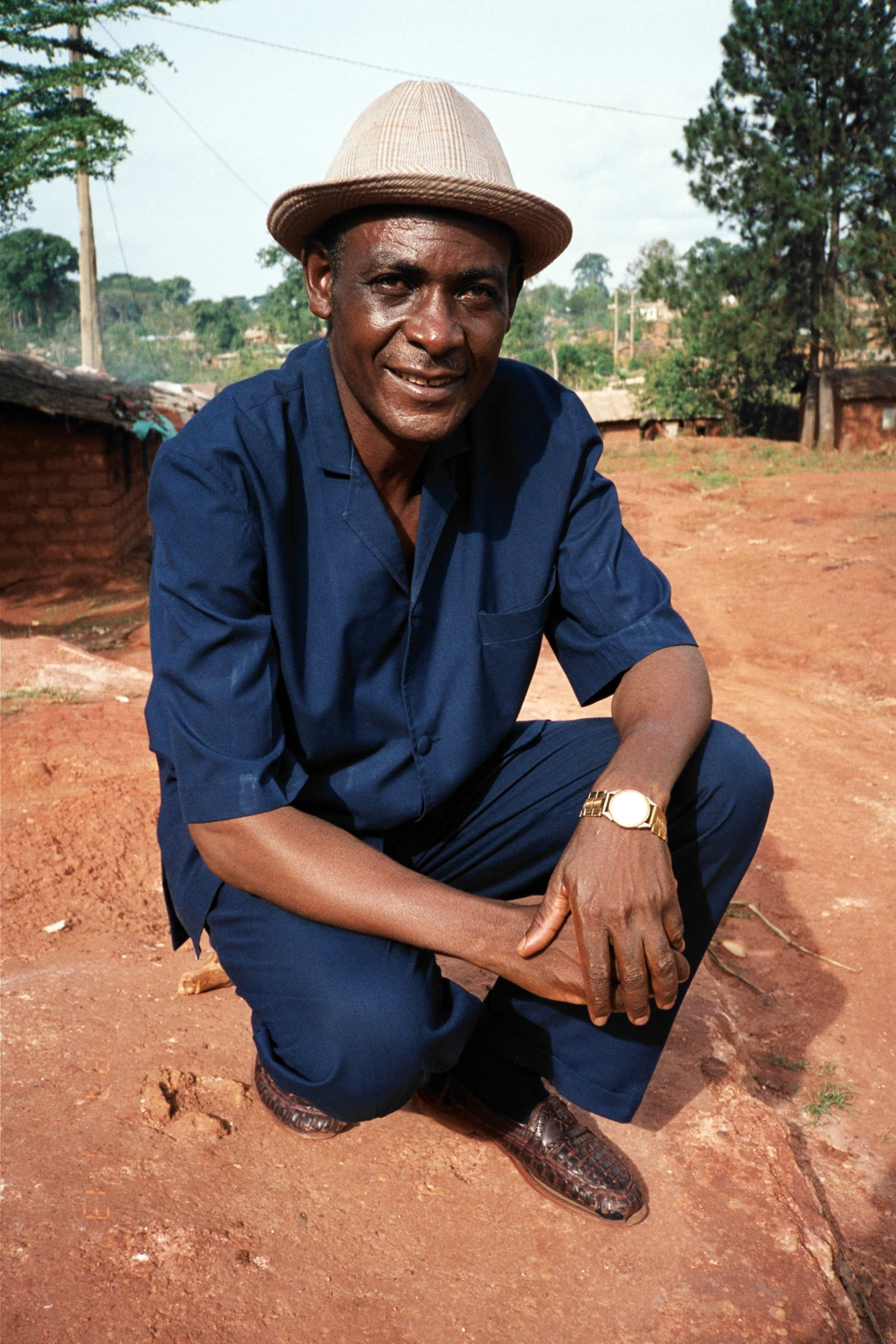
Chila in April 2000

Joseph Chila is a Cameroonian photographer from Mbouda in the West Region of Cameroon. For most of his working life he was based in Mayo-Darlé in Adamawa Region.

== Early life ==
Joseph Chila was born in 1948 near Mbouda in the West Region of Cameroun, in the Bamiléké area. He was apprenticed to an uncle, Jacques Toussele, in Mbouda from 1969 to 1974; then he set up a studio for some six months in Mbouda before moving to Mayo-Darlé in the Adamaoua Region in 1975 after one of his relatives told him that there was no photographer there.

== Career ==
Joseph Chila worked as a studio photographer in Mayo-Darlé, a small town that then had a tin mine operating that brought wealth to the residents. He remained in Mayo-Darlé until the mid-1990s when he retired to Bankim (some 70 km from Mayo-Darlé) where he currently (2020) lives, farming and undertaking occasional photographic commissions.

His work has been exhibited in Yaoundé, Douala and Bamenda and in the National Portrait Gallery (London). In Joseph Chila and Samuel Finlak: Two Portrait Photographers in Cameroon, which accompanied the London show, Andrew Wilson points out how different Chila's work is from Irving Penn's images from Cameroon; (Note: An example of Penn's work.) and while there are parallels with other African photographers such as Seydou Keïta, Chila's work is distinct. Chila's work has also been discussed by the art historian Graham Clarke. Of one of Chila's portraits, Clarke makes parallels with Richard Avedon and says "The effect is to both suggest an extraordinary sense of presence which, in relation to Barthes' use of the [']mask', achieves, once again, a remarkable sense of the individual subject." (Note: Clarke is referring here to something Roland Barthes writes in Camera Lucida.)

== Exhibitions ==
- Cameroon: Faces and places: A photographic exhibition by two Cameroonian photographers. With Samuel Finlak. Except where noted, curated by David Zeitlyn and David Reason
  - British Council, Yaoundé Seminar Room, 16–30 Jan 2004
  - British Council Library, Bamenda, 1–8 March 2004 (during Commonwealth week)
  - British Council Offices, Douala, February 2005
  - National Portrait Gallery, London, Summer 2005. Curated by NPG staff.
- Photo Cameroon: Studio Portraiture 1970-1990s: a major exhibition at the Fowler Museum at UCLA in the second half of 2021: See https://www.fowler.ucla.edu/exhibitions/photo-cameroon/. Curated by Erica Jones and David Zeitlyn.

== Collections ==
- National Portrait Gallery, London. Two portraits.
