= Mbondjanga =

- Location within Cameroon
- Coordinates: 6.24°N 11.30°E
- Country: Cameroon
- Region: Adamawa
- Department: Mayo-Banyo
- arrondissement: Bankim
- Elevation: 782 m (2,566 ft)

Population (2005)
  - Total: 1,043

Mbondjanga is a village in the commune of Bankim in the Adamawa Region of Cameroon, near the border with Nigeria.

== Population ==
In 1967, Mbondjanga had 94 inhabitants, mainly Kondja.

At the time of the 2005 census, there were 1043 people in the village.

== Bibliography ==
- Jean Boutrais, 1993, Peuples et cultures de l'Adamaoua (Cameroun) : actes du colloque de Ngaoundéré du 14 au 16 janvier 1992, Paris : Éd. de l'ORSTOM u.a.
- Dictionnaire des villages de l'Adamaoua, ONAREST, Yaoundé, October 1974, 133 p.
