= Mbamti-Laïnde =

- Coordinates: 6.48°N 12.01°E
- Country: Cameroon
- Region: Adamawa
- Department: Mayo-Banyo

Population (2005)
  - Total: 1,332

Mbamti-Laïnde is a village in the commune of Banyo in the Adamawa Region of Cameroon.

== Population ==
In 1967, Mbamti-Laïnde contained 291 inhabitants, mostly Fula people.

At the time of the 2005 census, there were 1332 people in the village.

== Bibliography ==
- Jean Boutrais, 1993, Peuples et cultures de l'Adamaoua (Cameroun) : actes du colloque de Ngaoundéré du 14 au 16 janvier 1992, Paris : Éd. de l'ORSTOM u.a.
- Dictionnaire des villages de l'Adamaoua, ONAREST, Yaoundé, October 1974, 133 p.
