= Ribao =

- Coordinates: 6.5000°N 11.4333°E
- Country: Cameroon
- Region: Adamawa
- Department: Mayo-Banyo
- Elevation: 1,276 m (4,186 ft)

Population (2005)
  - Total: 2,073

Ribao is a village in the commune of Mayo-Darlé in the Adamawa Region of Cameroon, near the border with Nigeria.

== Population ==
In 1967, Ribao contained 1184 inhabitants, mostly Mambila.

At the time of the 2005 census, there were 2073 people in the village.

== Bibliography ==
- Jean Boutrais, 1993, Peuples et cultures de l'Adamaoua (Cameroun) : actes du colloque de Ngaoundéré du 14 au 16 janvier 1992, Paris : Éd. de l'ORSTOM u.a.
- Dictionnaire des villages de l'Adamaoua, ONAREST, Yaoundé, October 1974, 133 p.
