= David Zeitlyn =

British anthropologist

David Zeitlyn FRAI
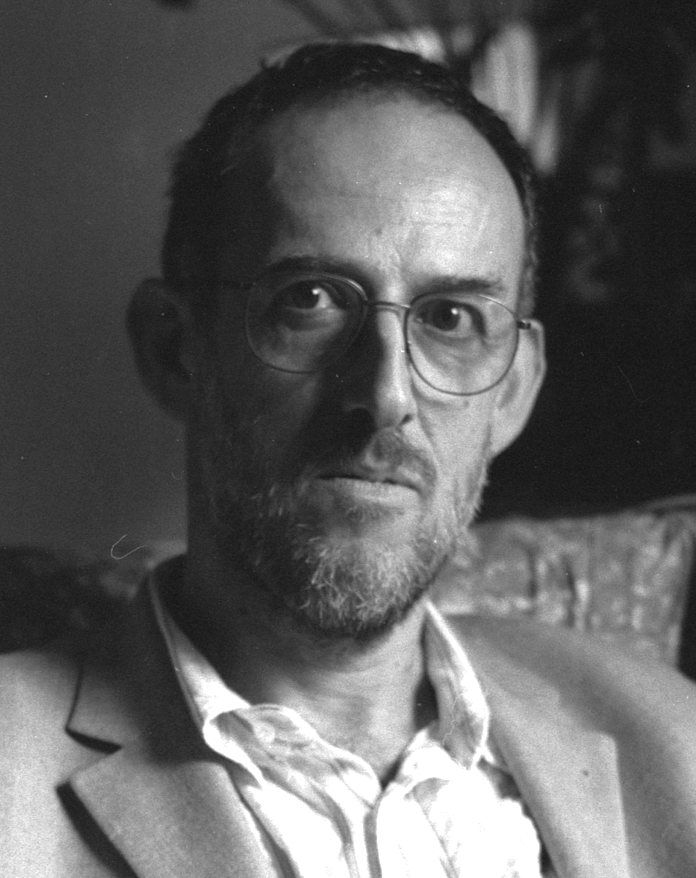
- Zeitlyn in 2005
- Born: 1958 (age 67–68); Cambridge, England
- Occupations: Anthropologist; Sociolinguist; Photo Historian

Academic background
- Education: Wadham College, Oxford; Trinity College, Cambridge; London School of Economics
- Thesis: Mambila Traditional Religion: Sua in Somié (1990)

Academic work
- Notable works: Virtual Institute of Mambila Studies
- Website: users.ox.ac.uk/~wolf2728/

David Zeitlyn FRAI (born 1958) is a British anthropologist. He is Professor of Social Anthropology at the University of Oxford, and a supernumerary-Fellow of Wolfson College, Oxford. His research has concentrated on the Mambila people of Cameroon, endangered languages and Cameroonian photographers such as Samuel Finlak, Joseph Chila and the late Jacques Toussele. Working on anthropological archives has led him to write on the ethics of archiving fieldwork data, and he has helped revise the Association of Social Anthropologists (ASA) ethical guidelines for anthropology. He has worked extensively on divination especially the form known as spider divination or nggam.

== Early life and education ==
David Zeitlyn was born in 1958 in Cambridge, England. He was educated at The Perse School, Cambridge. He studied physics and philosophy at Wadham College, Oxford, before converting to anthropology by taking an anthropology master's degree at The London School of Economics and Political Science. He received his Doctor of Philosophy (PhD) degree in anthropology from the University of Cambridge in 1990 supervised by Esther Goody. His thesis was Mambila Traditional Religion: Sua in Somié.

== Career ==
After a Junior Research Fellowship between 1988 and 1991 at Wolfson College, Oxford, Zeitlyn had a British Academy fellowship also at Wolfson 1992–1995. Following that, he spent a brief spell as the inaugural IT officer at the Pitt Rivers Museum during which time he developed a networked catalog using a relational database system.

In 1995, Zeitlyn moved to the University of Kent at Canterbury as a lecturer in Social Anthropology, in the Department of Sociology and Social Anthropology. By 2007 he was Professor of Anthropology there. In 2010, he moved to the University of Oxford as a part-time Professor of Social Anthropology.

In 1995, he was appointed as Hon. Editor of the RAI's bibliographic database, the "Anthropological Index Online" and was concerned behind the scenes with some of the quiet, unseen and unacknowledged work to index and make work discoverable. Some of this was later discussed by Carocci and Earl-Fraser.

He also served for many years on the ESRC Resources Board which was funding the Social Science Data archive (now renamed as the UK Data Archive at the University of Essex which included the Qualidata archive, and some of the development of eSocial Science.

== Research ==
As well as his ongoing research in Cameroon (mainly with Mambila People), Zeitlyn has been involved in ways of using the Internet to make anthropological material available since before the web was invented. His first internet publication used Gopher to make one of the first sound recordings of a non-Indo-European language available online.

At the University of Kent Zeitlyn worked with Mike Fischer to develop the Centre of Social Anthropology and Computing (CSAC) on a variety of projects.

The CSAC vision as developed over the years was to make a wide range of research materials available for others to be able to use in various ways. This started with teaching: they wanted students to be able to see more of what the teaching staff-as- researchers had dealt with and synthesised into the articles and books which were the staple stuff of reading lists. This turned into a large project Experience Rich Anthropology the results of which are still online. This was discussed independently by Sarah Pink and others as well as by Zeitlyn himself.

He wrote a highly cited paper: "Gift economies in the development of open source software" that was in an early, formally-open, special issue of the journal 'Research Policy' His work on archives and ethics has led to some open access articles: "Archiving ethnography?" and "For Augustinian archival openness and laggardly sharing"

Following a workshop in Yaoundé, Cameroon in 2013 he helped found an online journal with two Cameroonian colleagues "Vestiges: Traces of Record".

In August 2025, his essay on Mambila spider divination was published by Aeon magazine.

== Honours ==
In 2003–2004 Zeitlyn was elected to be the Evans-Pritchard Lecturer, All Souls College Oxford. He won the 2023 Curl Essay Prize awarded by the Royal Anthropological Institute of Great Britain and Ireland.

== Exhibits ==
- 2024-5 (December–April) Zeitlyn was co-curator with Dr Michelle Aroney of the exhibition "Oracles, Omens and Answers" at the Weston Library, Oxford, part of the Bodleian Library
- 2021 (July–December), "Photo Cameroon: Studio Portraiture 1970-1990s" co-curated with Erica Jones, exhibition at the Fowler Museum at UCLA.
- Organiser/curator of 'Cameroon- faces and places: a photographic exhibition by two Cameroonian photographers', first at the British Council, Yaoundé, in January 2004, and second at the National Portrait Gallery, London in Summer 2005 as part of Africa'05.
- Collaboration with the artist Tomás Saraceno was reflected in the summer 2023 exhibition in the Serpentine Gallery London.

== Books and monographs ==
- Aroney, Michelle; Zeitlyn, David (2024). Divination Oracles Omens. Bodleian Library Press. ISBN 978-1-85124-633-5.
- Zeitlyn, David (2022). An Anthropological Toolkit: Sixty Useful Concepts. Berghahn. ISBN 978-1-80073-535-4.
- Zeitlyn, David (2020). Mambila Divination: Framing Questions, Constructing Answers. Routledge. ISBN 978-1-032-17408-2.
- Banks, Marcus; Zeitlyn, David (2015). Visual Methods in Social Research. Second Edition London: Sage. SAGE Publications. ISBN 978-1-4462-6975-6.
- Zeitlyn, David; Just, Roger (2014). Excursions in Realist Anthropology. A Merological Approach Newcastle: Cambridge Scholars Press. Cambridge Scholars Pub. ISBN 978-1-4438-6403-9.
- Zeitlyn, David (2005). Words and Processes In Mambila Kinship: the Theoretical Importance of the Complexity of Everyday Life. Lexington Books (Rowman & Littlefield), Lanham, Maryland. ISBN 978-0-7391-0801-7.
- Zeitlyn, David (2001). Reading in the Modern World: Anthropological Perspectives on Writing and the Virtual World (CSAC Monographs Online 17). Archived from the original on 22 April 2004.
- Zeitlyn, David; Mial, Nicodeme; Mbe, Charles (2000). Trois Études sur les Mambila de Somié, Cameroun (PDF). Groupe de Recherches sur l'Afrique Francophone, Boston, Mass.
- Zeitlyn, David; Fischer, Mike (1999). Experience Rich Anthropology. Resource Guide and Sampler CD for teachers and Students. CSAC.
- Zeitlyn, David; Bex, Jane; David, Matthew (1999). Knowledge Lost in Information, British Library Research and Information Group Research Report RIC/G/313. Office for Humanities Communication.
- Zeitlyn, David; Fowler, Ian (1996). African Crossroads: Intersections between history and anthropology in Cameroon. Berghahn Books. ISBN 978-1-57181-859-1.
- Zeitlyn, David (1994). Sua in Somié: Mambila Traditional Religion, Collectanea Instituti Anthropos v. 41. Academia Verlag. ISBN 978-3-88345-375-0.
