= Somié =

Somio
- Location within Cameroon
- Coordinates: 6°24′N 11°27′E
- Country: Cameroon
- Region: Adamawa
- Division: Mayo-Banyo
- Sub-division: Somie

Population (2001)
  - Total: 5,000
- Time zone: UTC+1 (WAT)

Somié is a village in Bankim, Mayo-Banyo in the Adamawa Region of Cameroon. It appears as Tchokmon on some early maps. It is located near the Nigeria – Cameroon border at 6°28' N, 11° 27' E. It has an officially designated "second degree" chief, several schools, churches and mosques as well as a government health centre. There is a small solar power installation that has been providing electricity to the village since 2018. The Mambila people who live there are predominantly farmers.

== List of the chiefs of Somié ==
1. Tuloom
2. Ndinyura
3. Chomo/Chókmo
4. Nyura: first contact with the Germans (Hurault)
5. Menandi: 8 wives; 10 as chief
6. Konaka (Kolaka in official documents): chief from 1923? to 1949 died in Nov. 49
7. Ndi Etienne: chef from 1950 to end June 1953
8. Mɔgɔ Michel: 6 wives; chief from 1954 to December 1976
9. Dega François: born in 1950 died 29 April 2002; chief from November 1977 to 2002.
10. Ndi Adam: Died 15 September 2017 chief from 2003 to 2017
11. Ernest Konaka: chief from Jan 2018

The first wife of Konaka and mother of Ndi was Diko Madeleine
