= Samuel Finlak =

Cameroonian photographer (1958–2023)

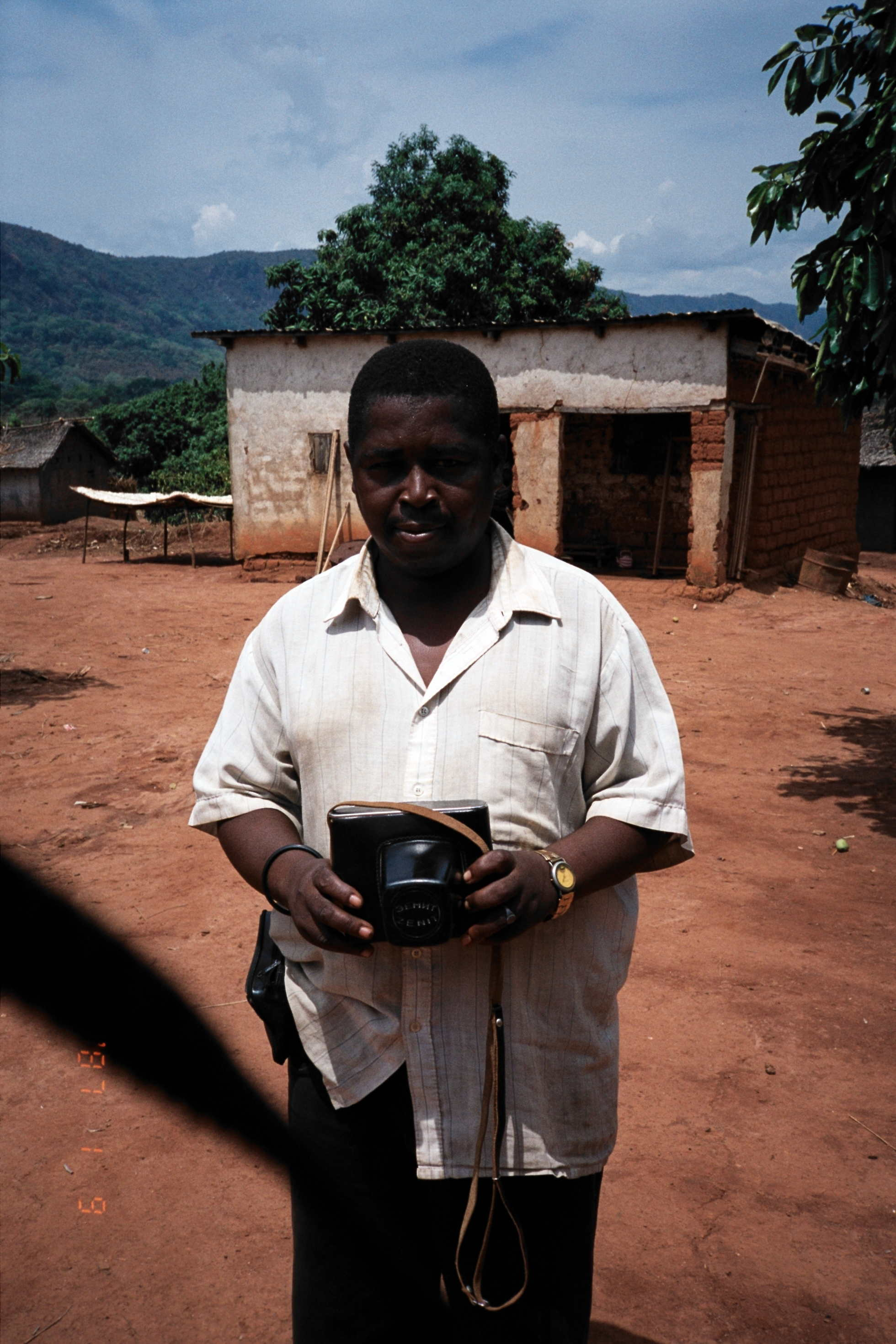
- Born: Samuel Finlak; 1958; Ngwa, Donga-Mantung
- Died: 8 January 2023 (aged 64–65)
- Occupation: Photographer

Samuel Finlak (1958 - 8 January 2023) was a Cameroonian photographer originally from the Yamba village of Bongor, Ngwa, in Northwest Province (now Northwest Region) of Cameroon. For most of his working life he was the resident photographer in Atta Village, Adamawa Region. He died on 8 January 2023.

== Early life ==
Samuel Finlak was born in 1958 at Bongor, Ngwa village in Donga-Mantung department, where he trained as a photographer via a correspondence course.

== Career ==
Having l photography in Ngwa, in February 1986 Finlak moved some fifty kilometres to the village of Atta on the Tikar Plain in the Adamawa Region, where he established himself as the village photographer and also worked in neighboring villages such as Songkolong and Somié.

Finlak's work has been exhibited in Yaoundé, Douala, and Bamenda, and in the National Portrait Gallery (London). In Joseph Chila and Samuel Finlak: Two Portrait Photographers in Cameroon, which accompanied the London show, Andrew Wilson singles out the joy of the people depicted in Finlak's work; and while there are parallels with other African photographers such as Malick Sidibé, Finlak's style is distinct. Finlak's work has also been discussed by the art historian Graham Clarke. Clarke comments on the power of Finlak's portraits and the compositional skill of the group images.

== Exhibitions ==
- Cameroon: Faces and places: A photographic exhibition by two Cameroonian photographers. With Joseph Chila. Except where noted, curated by David Zeitlyn and David Reason.
  - British Council, Yaoundé Seminar Room, 16–30 Jan 2004.
  - British Council Library, Bamenda, 1–8 March 2004 (during Commonwealth week).
  - British Council Offices, Douala, February 2005.
  - National Portrait Gallery, London, Summer 2005. Curated by NPG staff.
- Photo Cameroon: Studio Portraiture 1970-1990s: a major exhibition at the Fowler Museum at UCLA in the second half of 2021: See Photo Cameroon: Studio Portraiture, 1970s-1990s. Curated by Erica Jones and David Zeitlyn.

== Collections ==
- National Portrait Gallery, London. Two portraits.
