= Bafut people =

African people

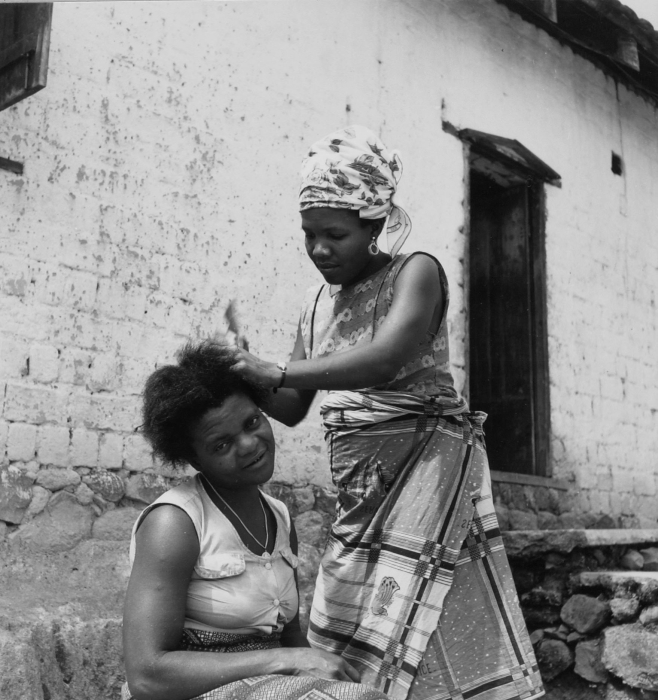
Bafut women (1960)

Bafut people, also known as Fut or Bufu people are a Grassfields ethnic group located in the Bafut Subdivision of the North West Province, Cameroon.

== Language and Literacy ==
Around 134 000 Bafut people speak the Bafut language, an Eastern Grassfields language of the Niger-Congo languages. Thirty percent of the Fut people read and write the language. Expanding Literacy in Fut language is supported by ten schools and thirty churches.

Bafut people were once multilingual. Most of the upper Bafut can speak the Bafut language and Cameroonian Pidgin English. Also, in a minor degree, they can speak local languages such as Mankon, Meta', or Mungaka.

== Religion ==
Christianity is the predominant religion between Bafut people, accounting for 74% to 95% of the population. A minor group still follows their ancestral religion. Bafut Christians divide between Roman Catholic, Protestants, and other independent churches.

The New Testament has been translated to the Bafut language and gospel recordings can be also heard.

== History ==
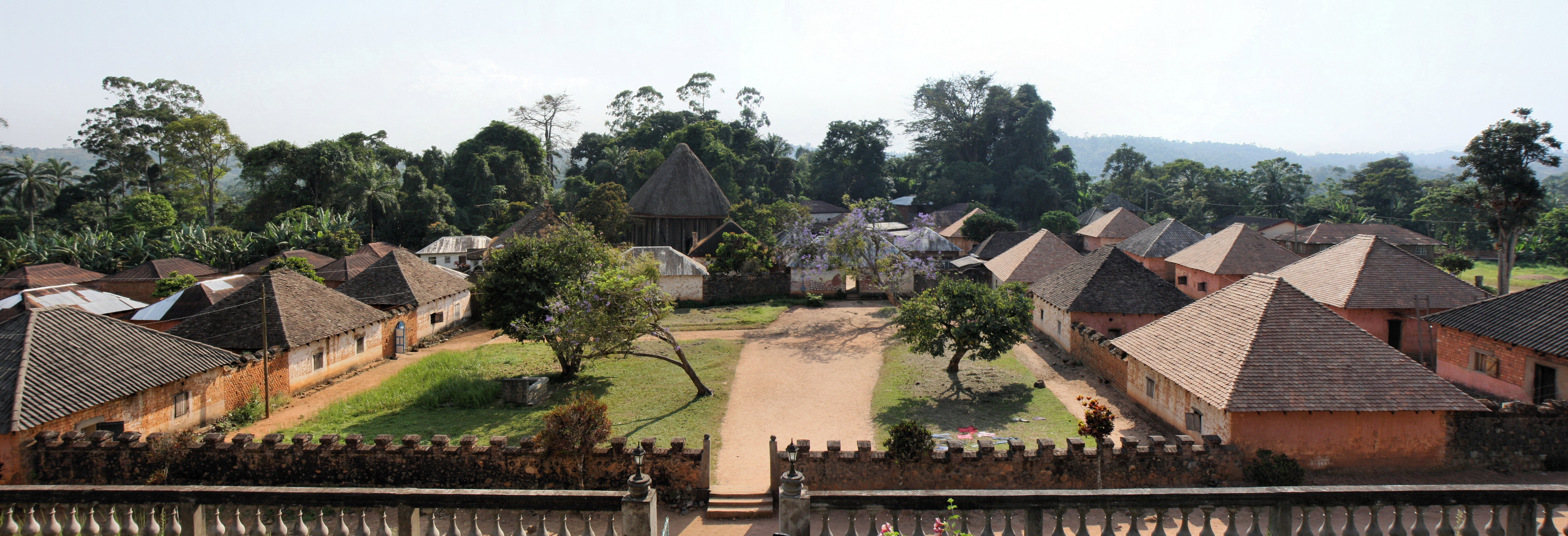
Fondom of Bafut, north of Bamenda. The main courtyard with the women's houses on the right, covered with tiles, the sacred forest in the background.

According to local ethnohistories collected by British colonial administrators, Bafut people arrived around 300 years ago from the area to the east-northeast of their present site. However, some researchers consider that the Bafut people area a composite community of several groups of different places.

At the end of the nineteenth century, Bafut fought against Germans and their allies in the Bafut wars.

== Social organization ==
The Fon of Bafut is appointed directly by the prime minister of the Republic of Cameroon, and it's considered a civil servant. Bafut people divide traditionally between the court and the commoners. The fon, their wives, the princes, and the princesses made up the court and they concentrated in the fon quarter. Main families of commoners participate in the management of polity to counterbalance fon's potentially absolute power.
