= Bankim =

- Location within Cameroon
- Coordinates: 6°4′58″N 11°29′24″E
- Country: Cameroon
- Region: Adamawa
- Division: Mayo-Banyo
- Sub-division: Bamkin
- not estimated
- Time zone: UTC+1 (WAT)

Bankim, M'Bankim, Bamkin or Kimi is a town and commune of the division Mayo-Banyo in Adamaoua in Cameroon. It is about 95 km from Foumban and 125 km from Banyo The area's vegetation is of shrub savanna type.

== History ==
Bankim is said to have been founded in 1395 by the local chief Kimi who founded the Tikar kingdom. Eldridge Mohammadou has given a date of 1760 to 1780 as the foundation date for the chiefdom.

== Hazards ==
Loaiasis is hyperendemic in this area, but is regarded as a generally mild and painless disease. It is reported that about 17% of the population in this area carry HIV/Aids, however the survey is based on urban surveys in the capital.

== Communications ==
Bankim is on the main road from Foumban to Banyo. The provincial road (P26) goes from nearby Nyamboya to Ndu via Sonkolong, Atta, and Sabongari. There is a post office, a hotel, some medical facilities and branches of Union Express and Exchange Express. Mobile phone coverage is good.

== Notable residents ==
- Joseph Chila, a local photographer who has exhibited in the National Portrait Gallery in London

== See also ==
- Communes of Cameroon
