= Ngambè-Tikar =

Coordinates: 5.7890°N 11.4936°E

- Commune and town
- Interactive map of Ngambè-Tikar
- Country: Cameroon
- Time zone: UTC+1 (WAT)

Ngambè-Tikar is a town and commune in Mbam-et-Kim department of Centre Region in Cameroon.

== See also ==
- Communes of Cameroon
