= Mbouda =

- Town
- Location in Cameroon
- Coordinates: 5°38′N 10°15′E
- Country: Cameroon
- Province: West Province

Government
  - Mayor: Claude Kamtchueng
  - Deputy Mayor: Aimé Ngahane
  - City Manager: Édouard Mbiandou
  - Deputy City Manager: Gaël Tientcheu
- Elevation: 249 m (817 ft)

Population (2012)
  - Total: 49,313

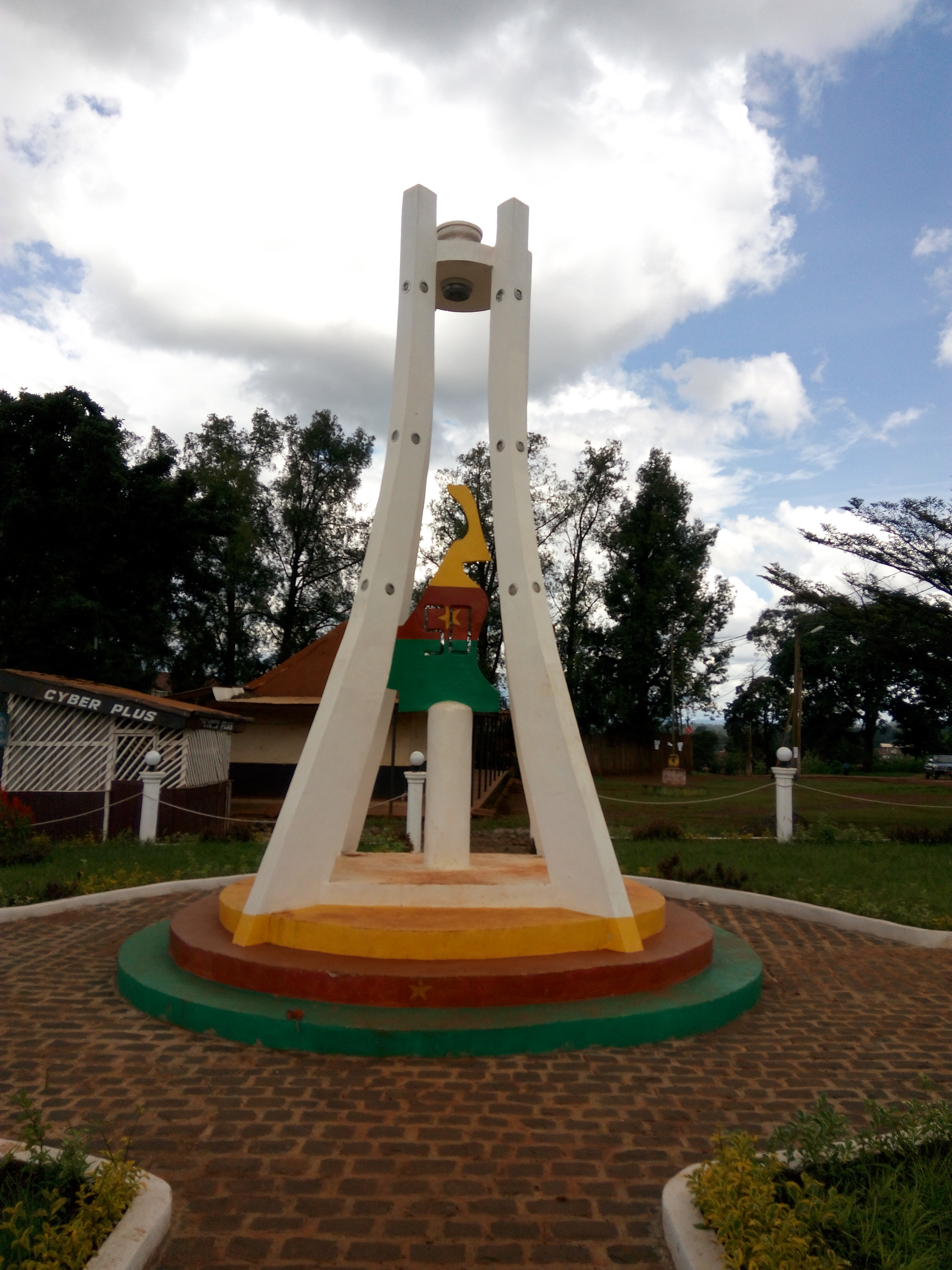
Mbouda

Mbouda is the capital of the Bamboutos department of West Province, Cameroon. Projected to be the fourteenth fastest growing city on the African continent between 2020 and 2025, with annual growth estimated at 5.16 percent per annum during that period.

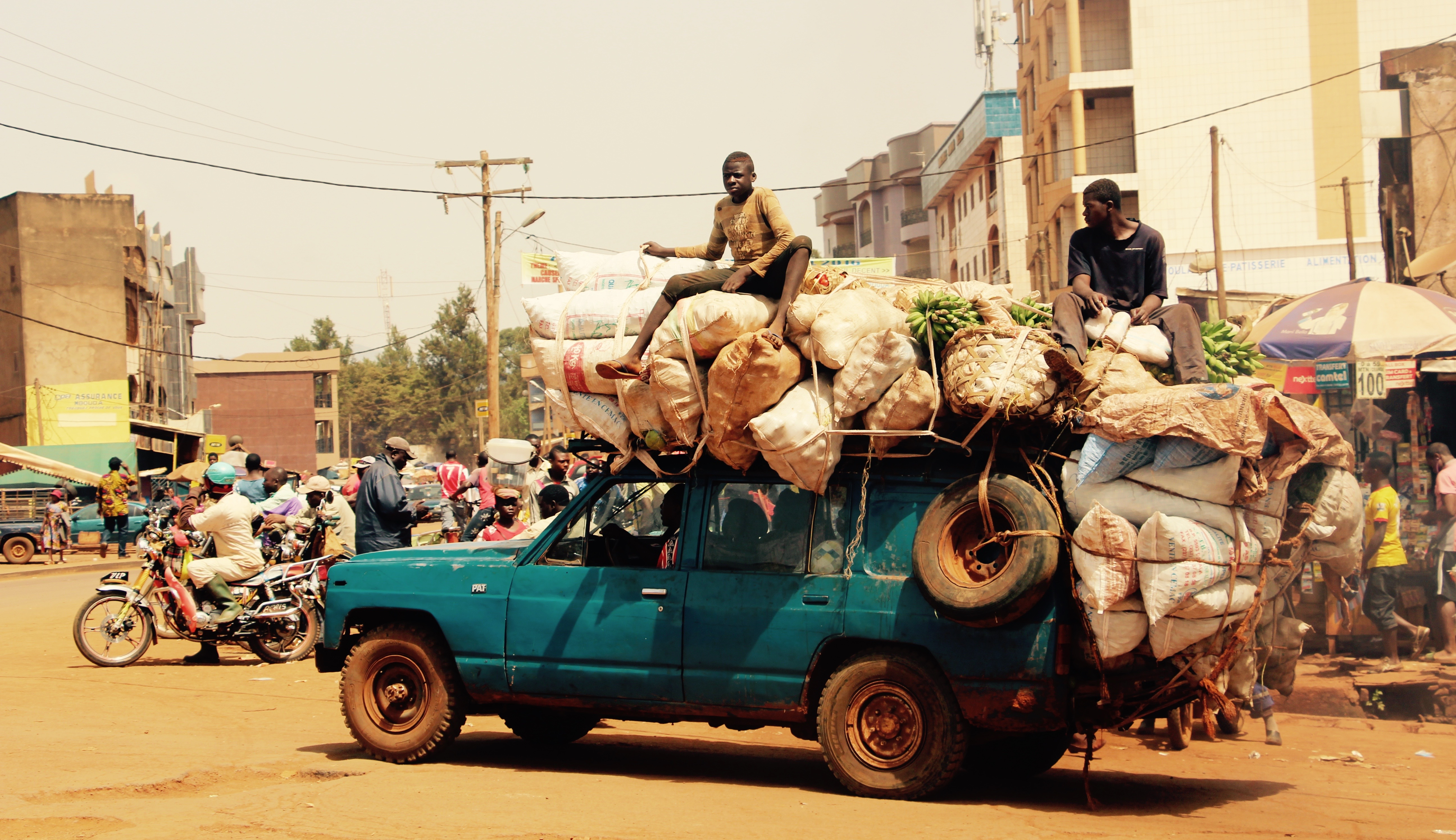
Vehicle loading in Mbouda

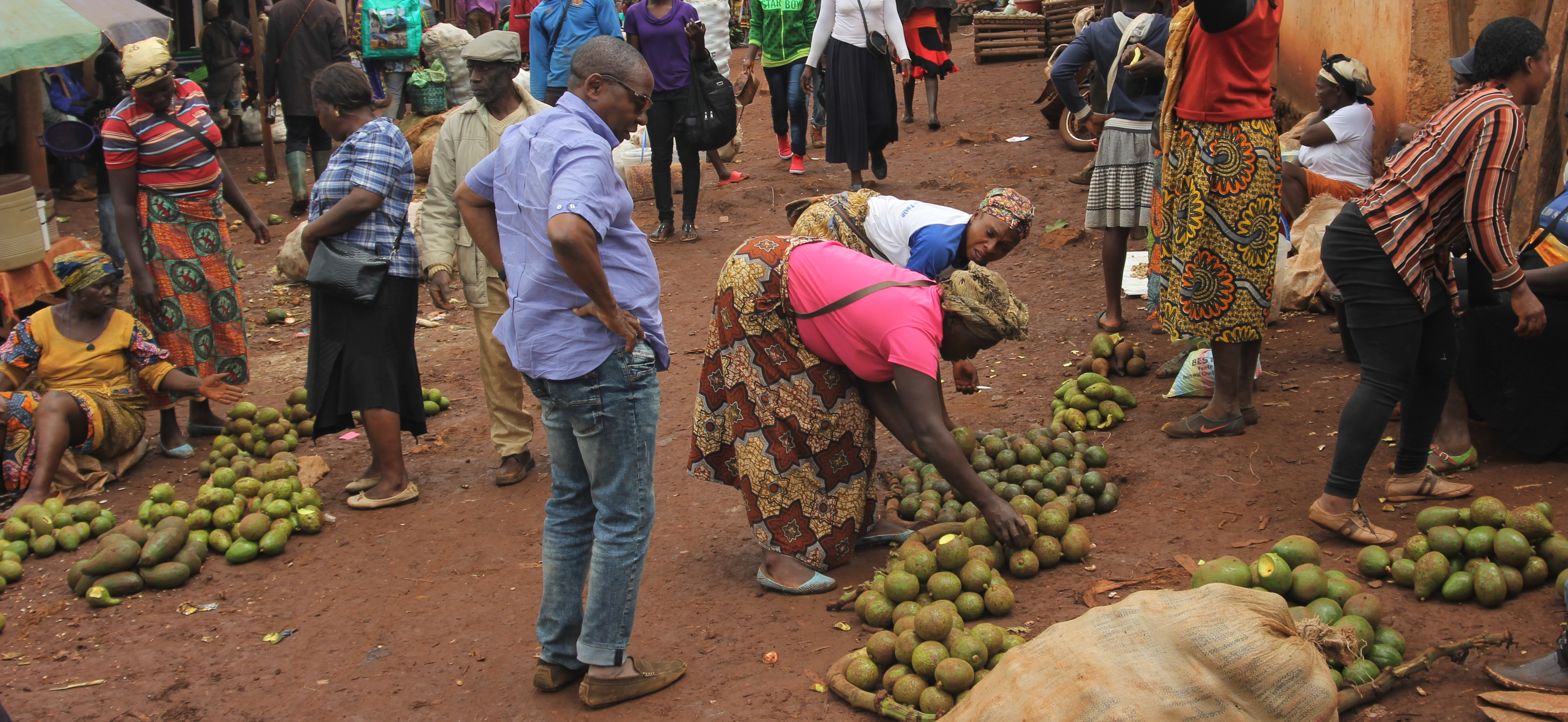
Sale of avocados in Mbouda

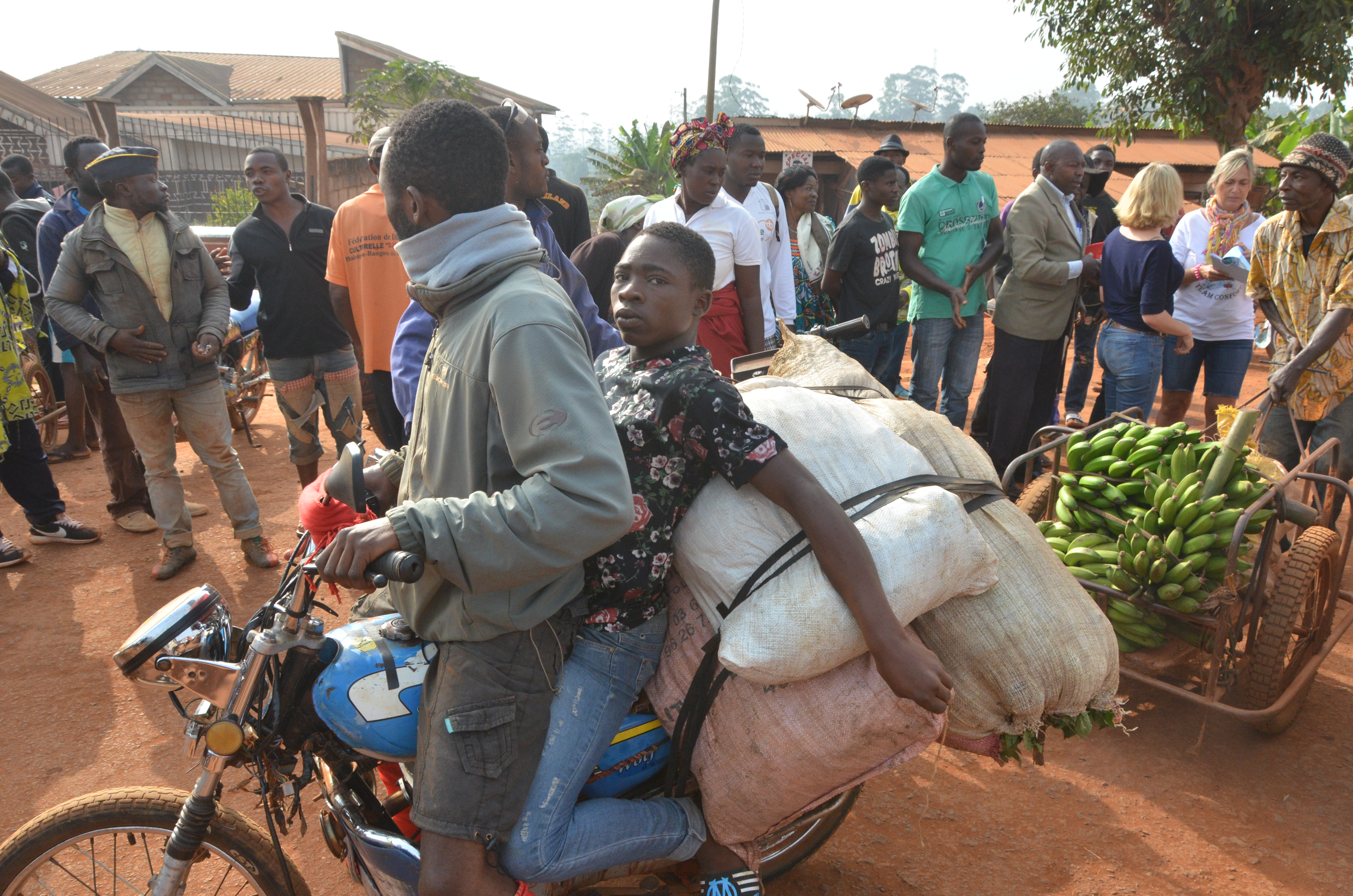
Moto-taxi in Mbouda - 2017.

== Notable people born in Mbouda ==
- Tony Sunshyne (Gilbert Nguita Noumessi), author / composer.
- Emmanuel Nganou Djoumessi, politician.
- Dieudonné Watio, Catholic bishop, born in Balatchi in 1946.
- Jacques Toussele, photographer, born in Bamessingué

== Buildings ==
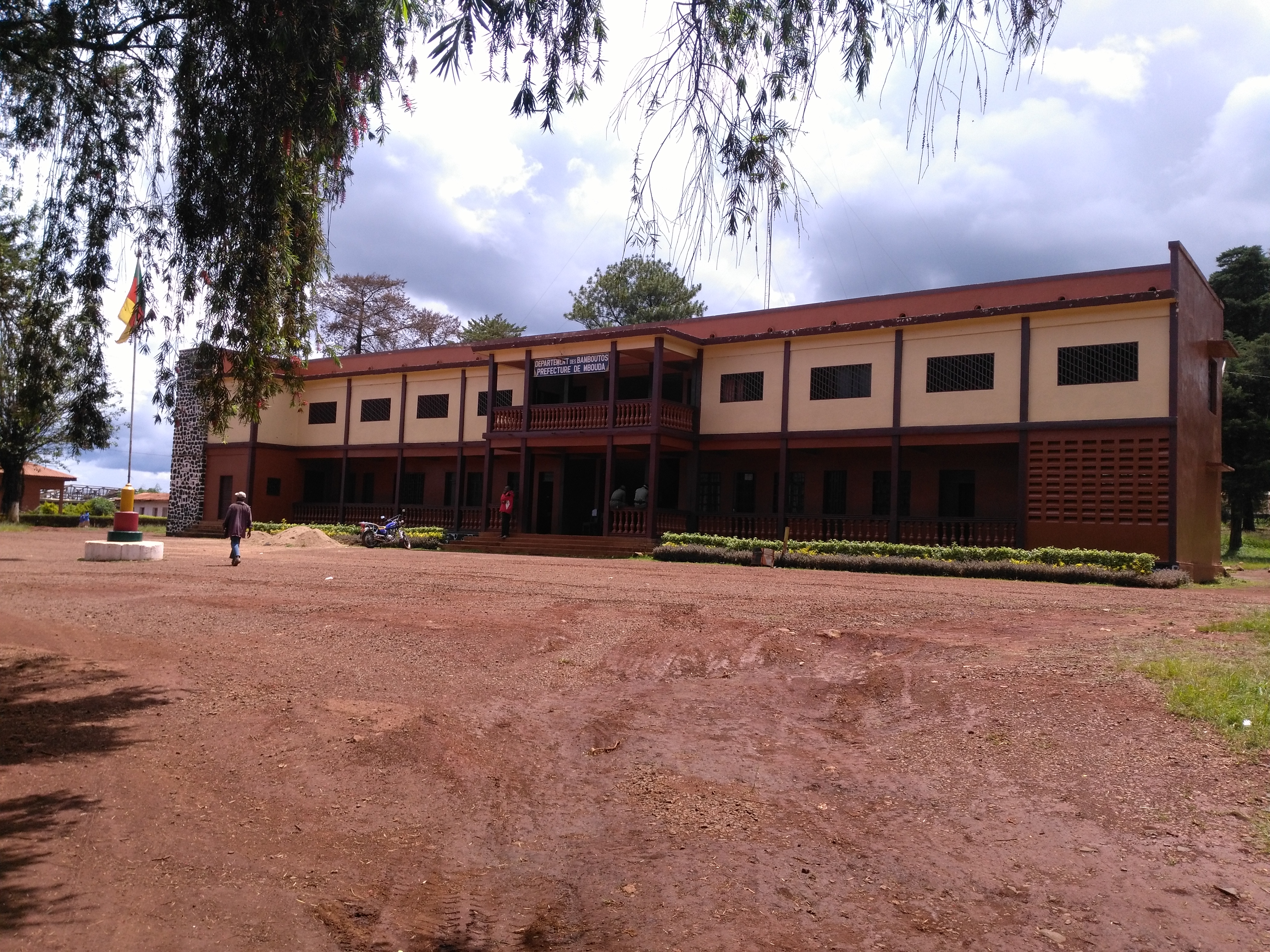
Mbouda Prefecture building

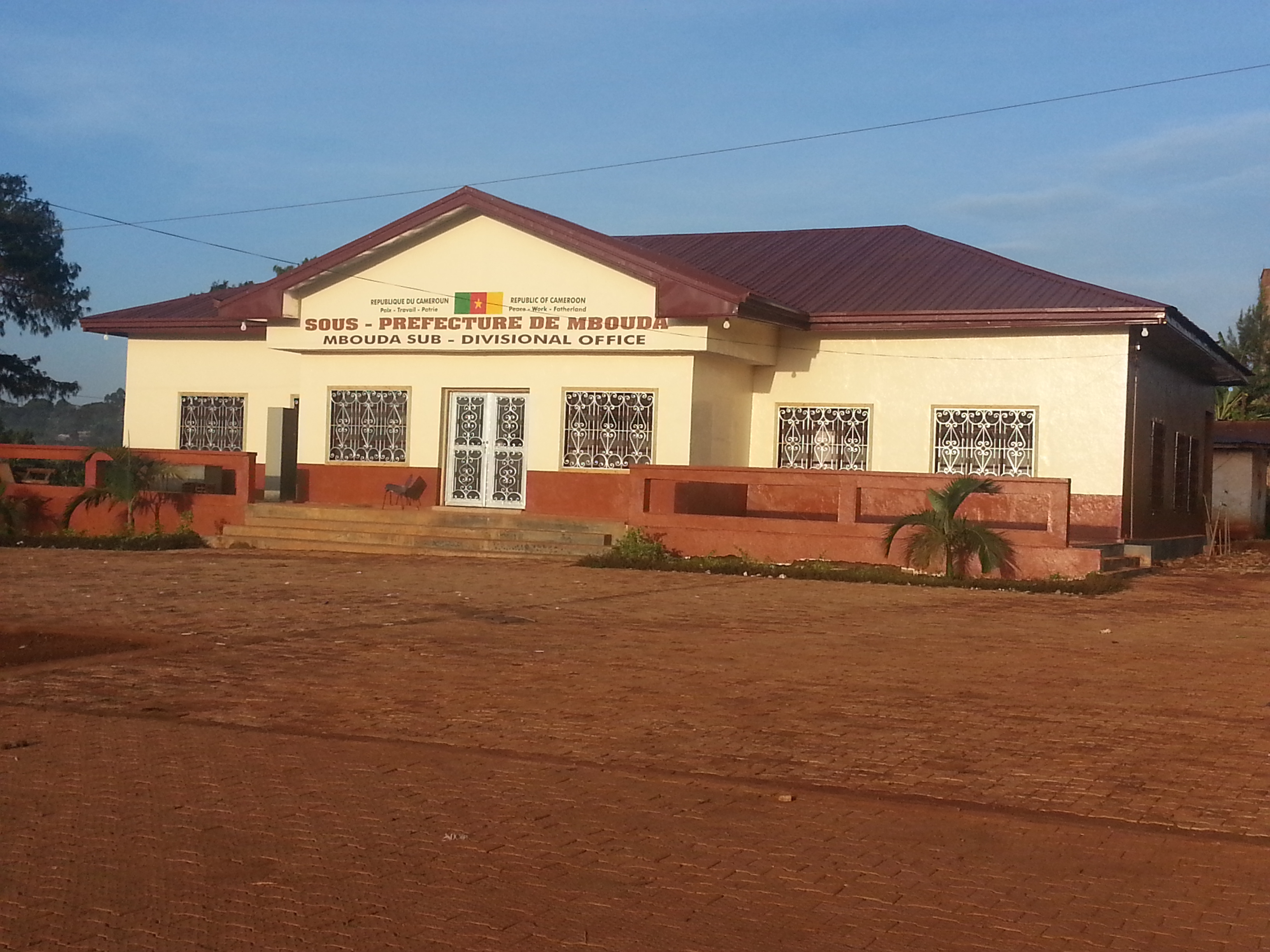
Mbouda sub-prefecture

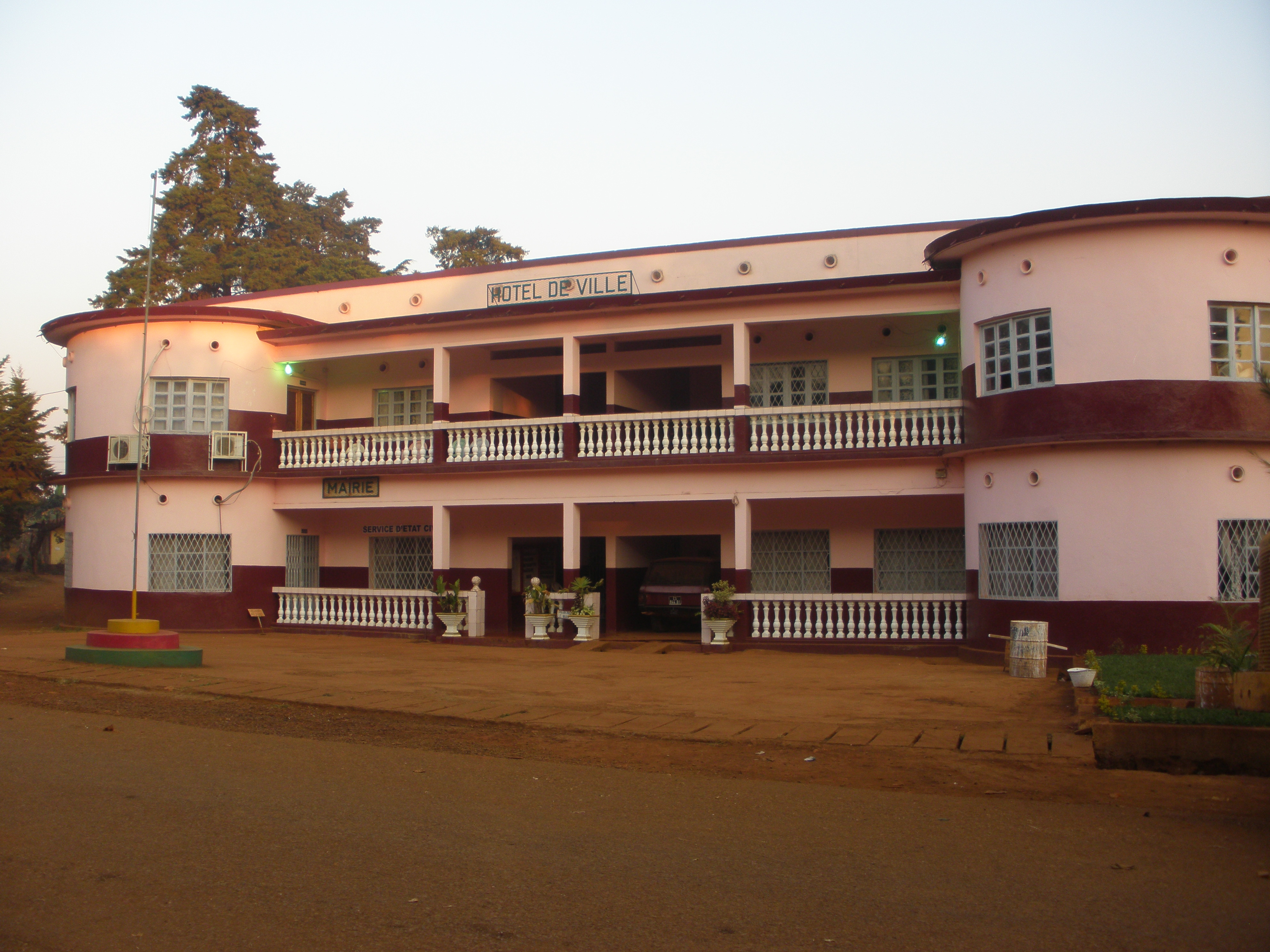
Mbouda City Hall

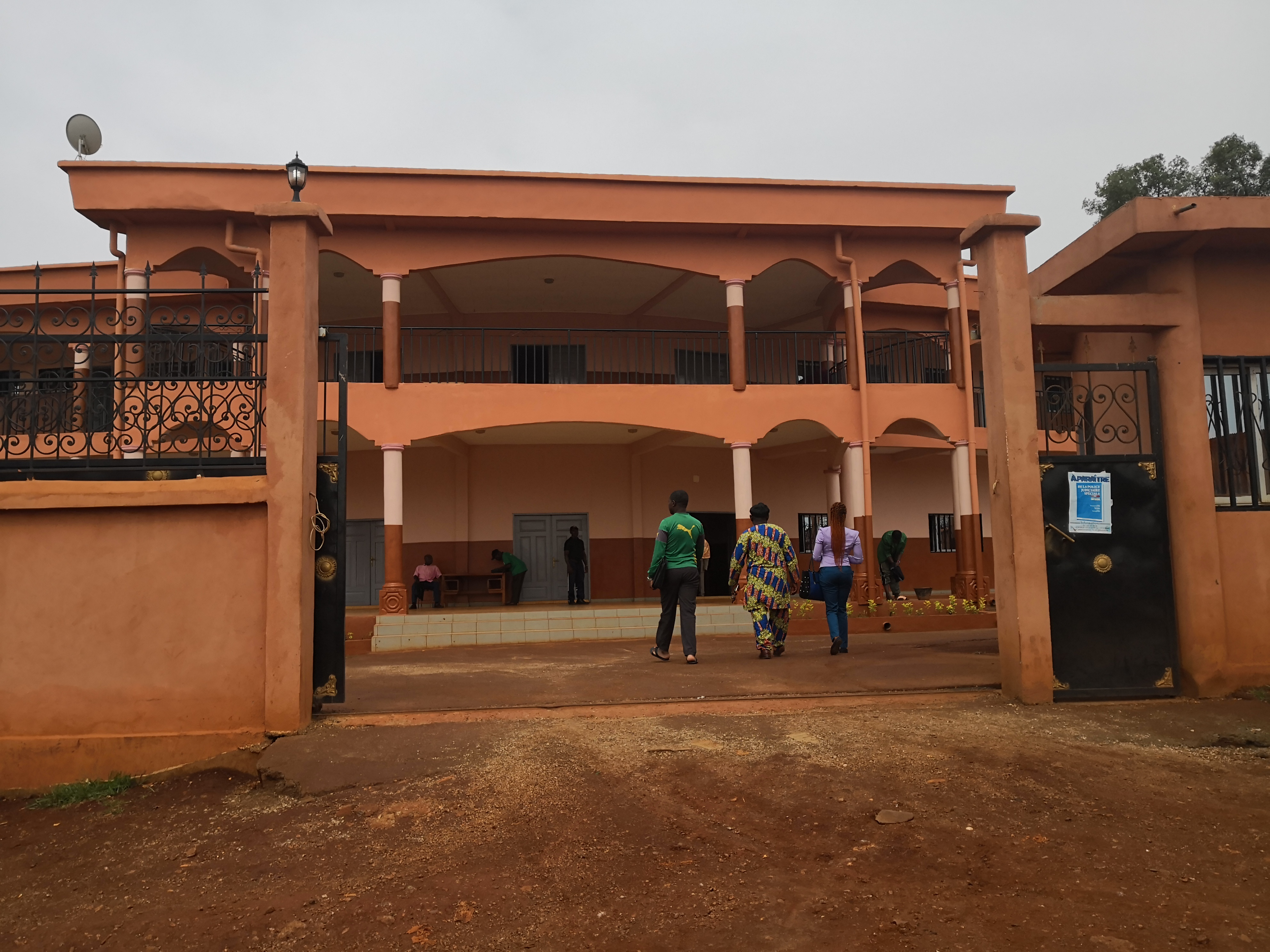
Mbouda Palace of Justice.

In 2022, American YouTuber MrBeast built a well in the city.

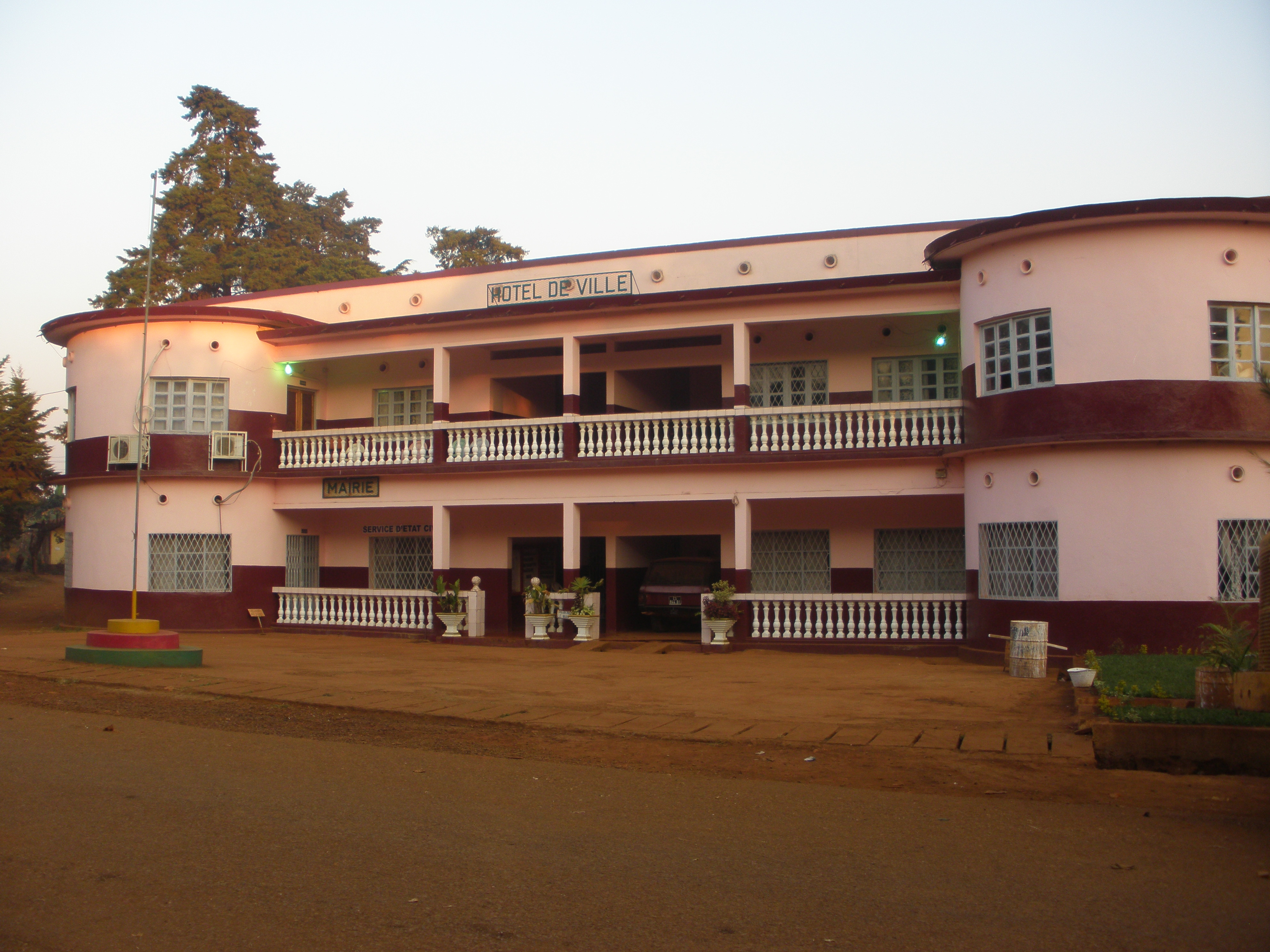
Marie de Mbouda

== Sport ==
Mbouda has a municipal stadium, renovated from 2007 to 2009, then a second time between 2018 and 2020 to be a training stadium for the Africa Cup of Nations 2021. It is the home of Bamboutos FC.

Renovation of the stadium for the ACN 2021

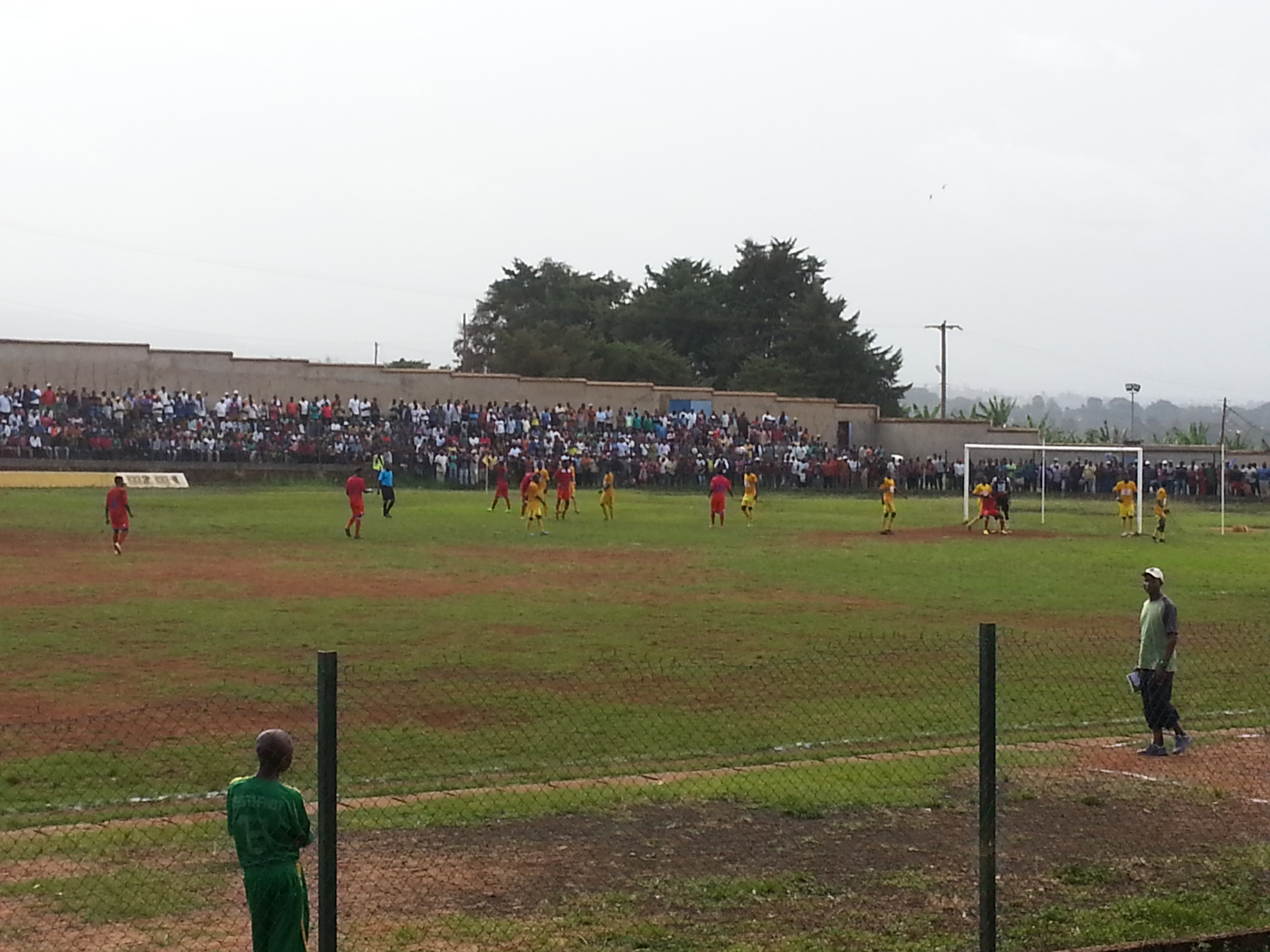
May 2015

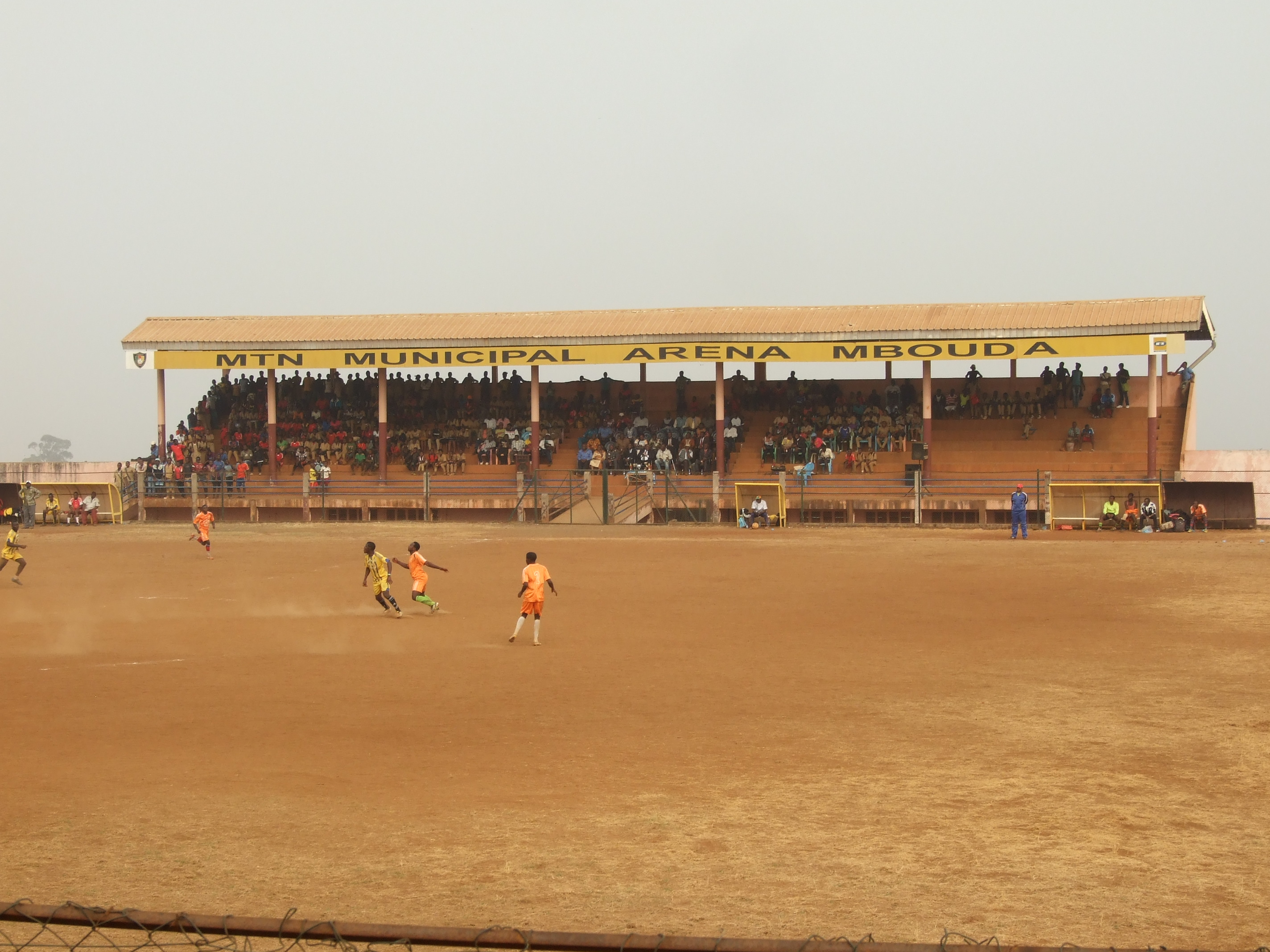
February 2016

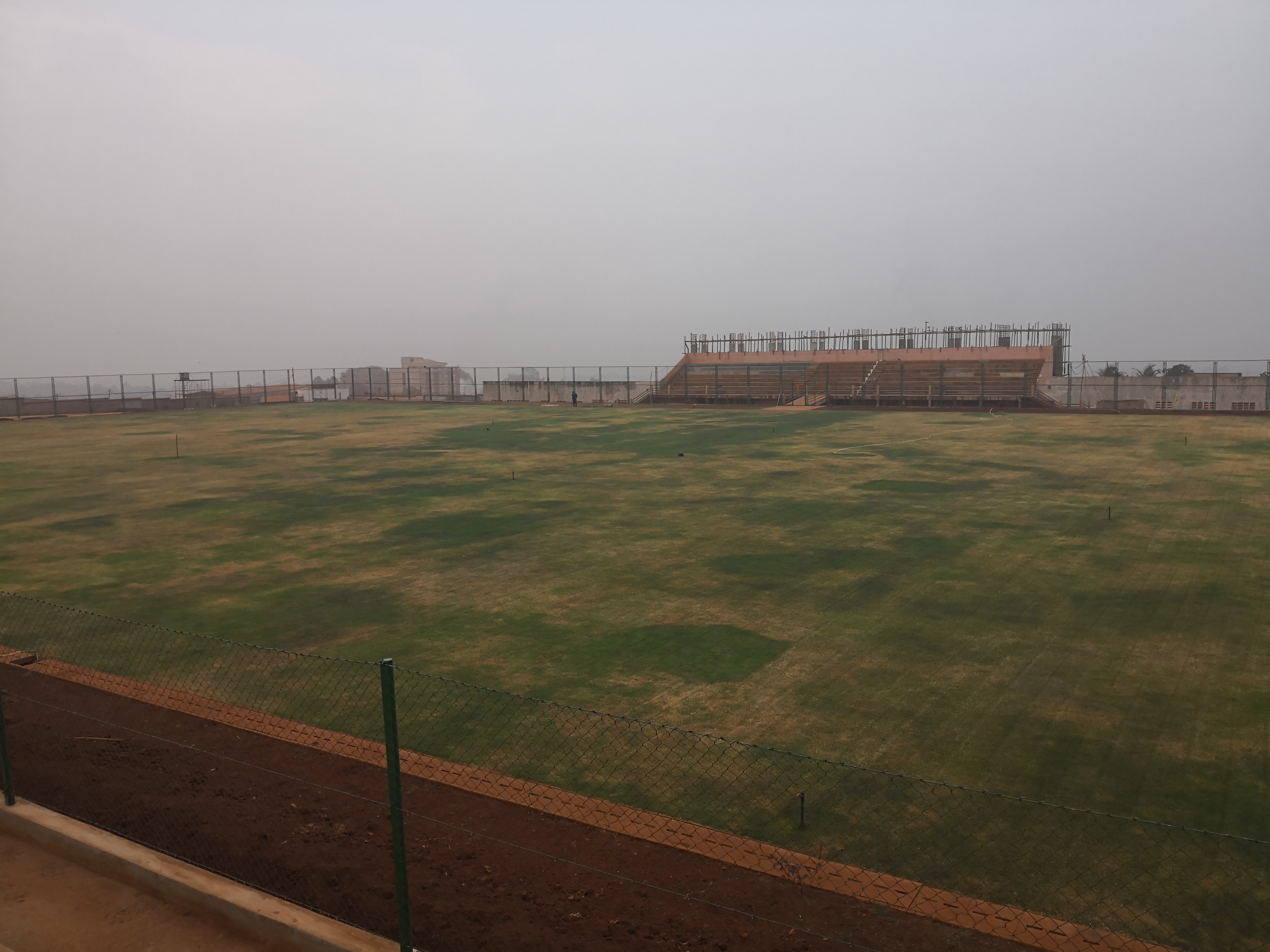
January 2019

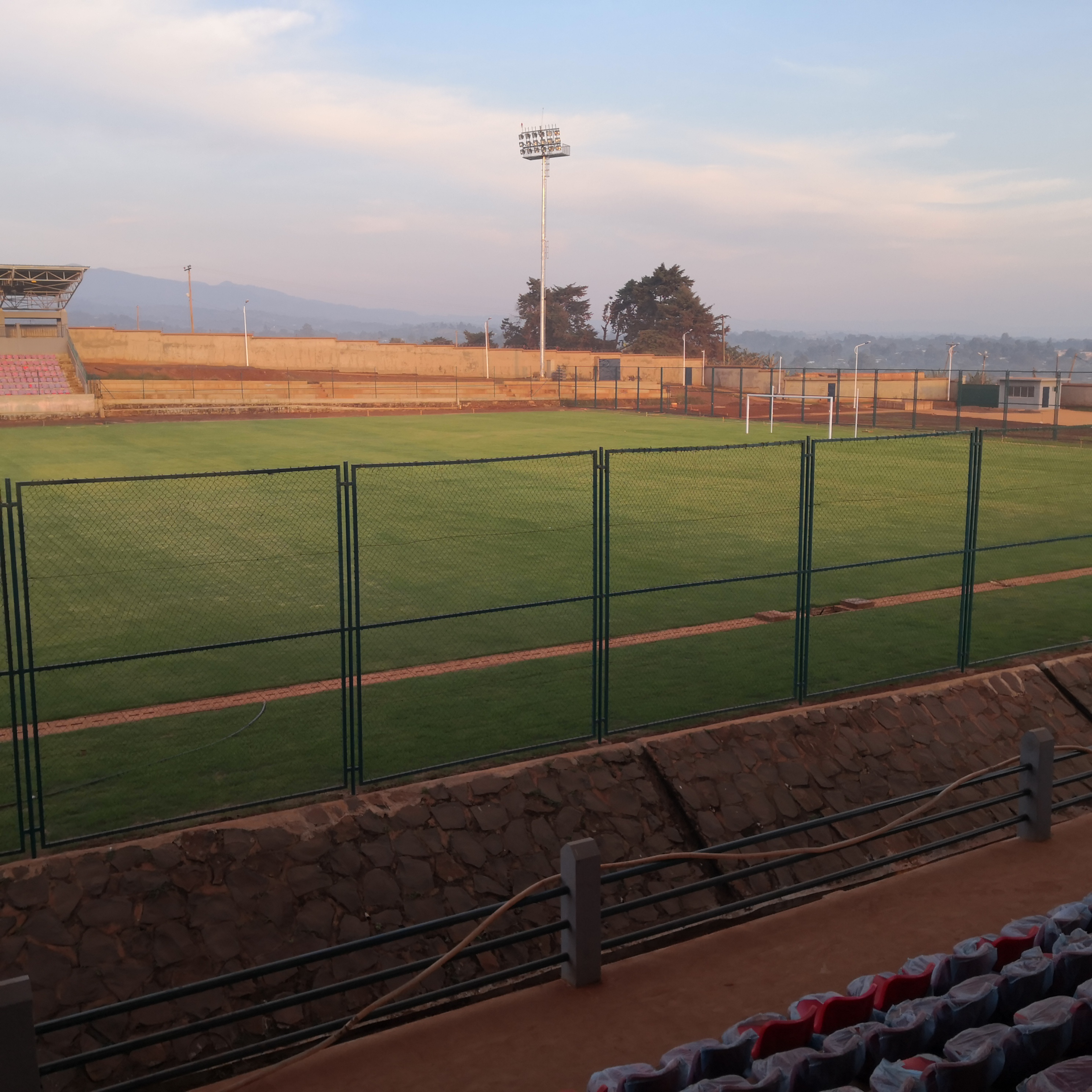
November 2019

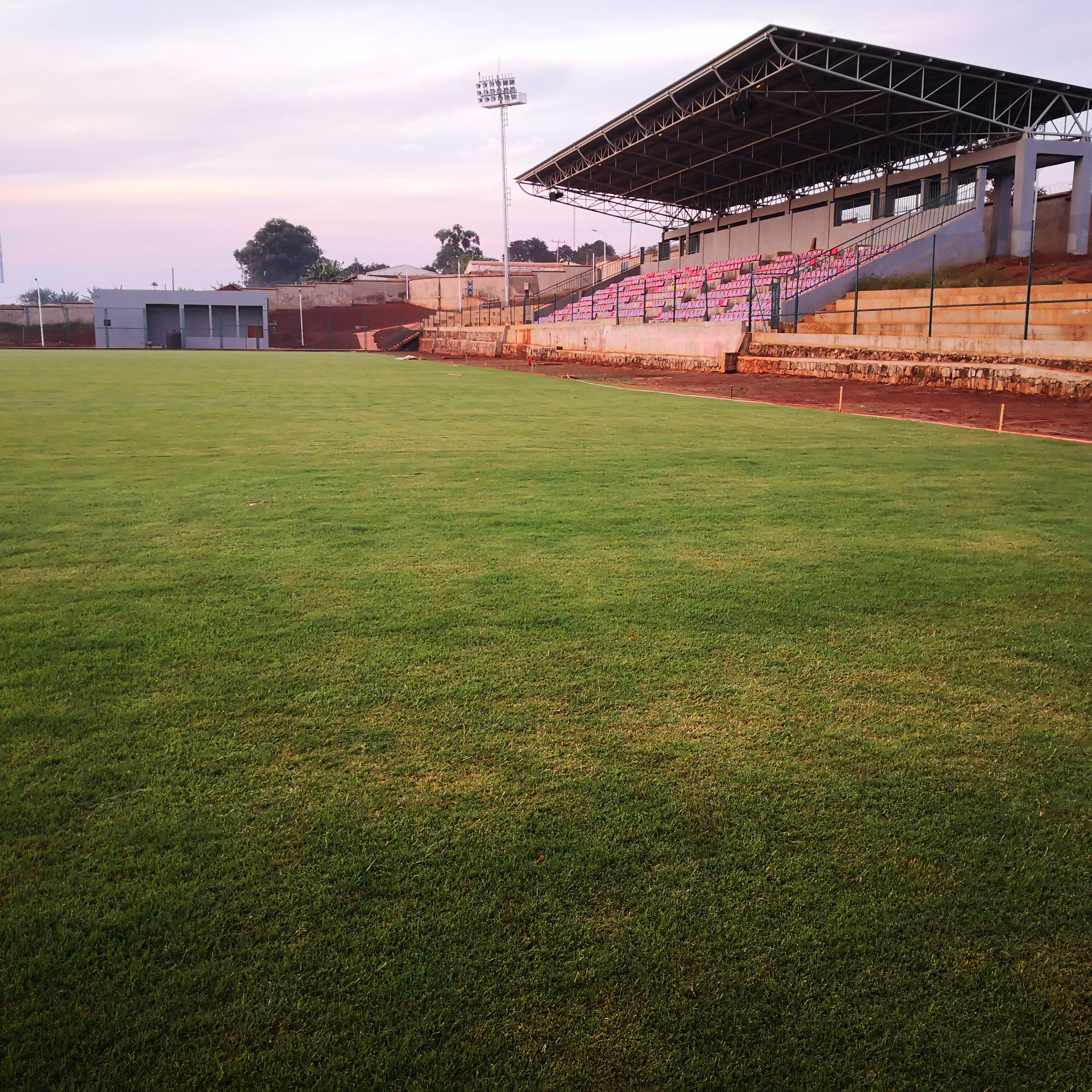
November 2019
