= Jacques Toussele =

Cameroonian photographer (1939-2017)

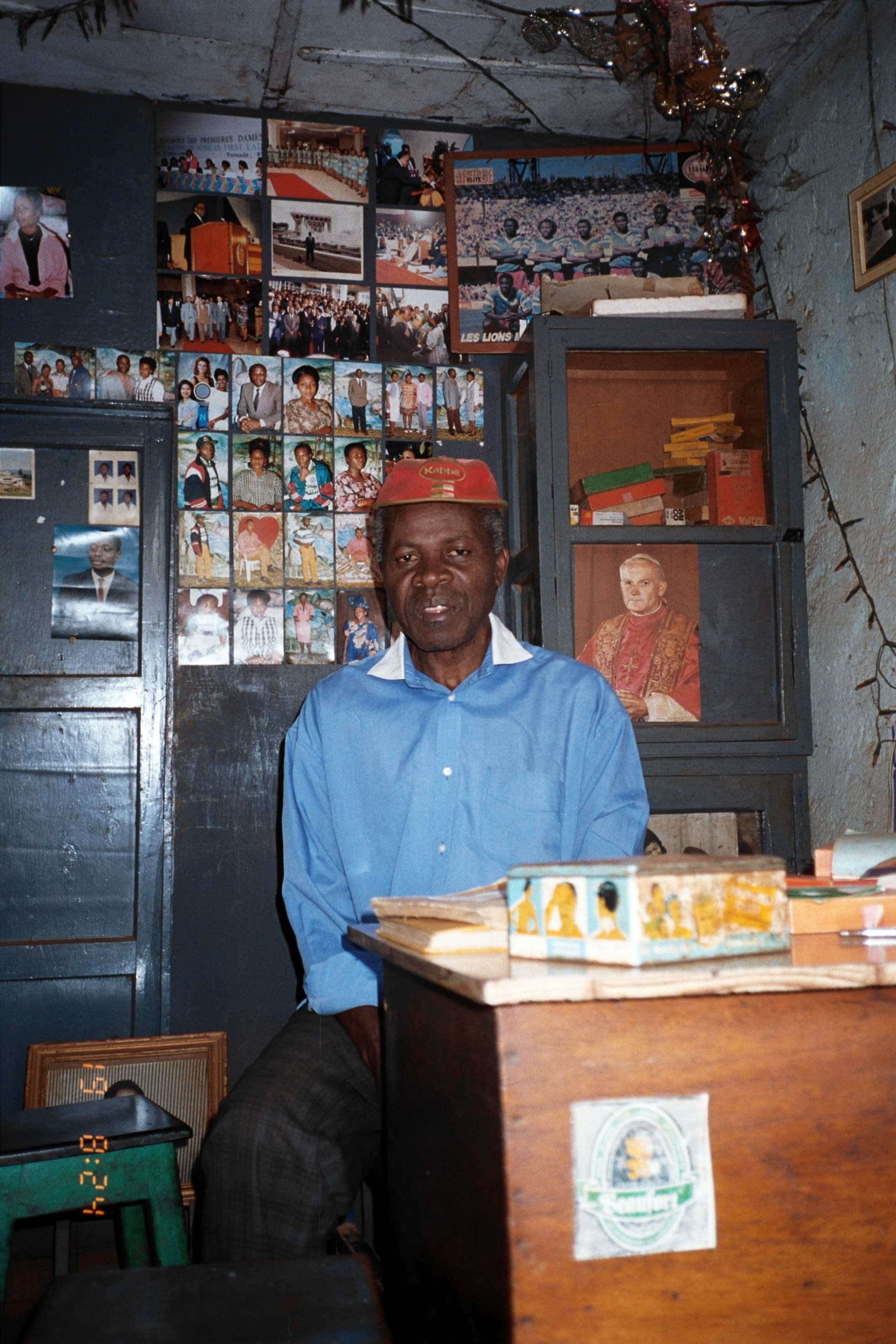
- Jacques Toussele in his last studio in Mbouda
- Born: 1939; Bamessingué, Cameroon
- Died: 30 June 2017 (aged 77–78)
- Citizenship: Cameroonian
- Occupation: Photographer
- Writing career
- Language: French
- Notable work: Metropolitan Museum of Art, New York

Jacques Toussele (1939 – 30 June 2017) was a Cameroonian photographer from Bamessingué near Mbouda in the Western Region of Cameroon.

There are several variant spellings of his Bamiléké name: Toussile, Tousellé, Tousselle, and Touselle are all attested. The spelling on his identity card is Toussele without an accent (but pronounced in the French fashion (Tousselé, phonetically [tus sεlε]). When his work was exhibited at the Pitt Rivers Museum, an accented variant of his name was used.

== Early life ==
Jacques Toussele was born in 1939 at Bamensingue.

== Career ==
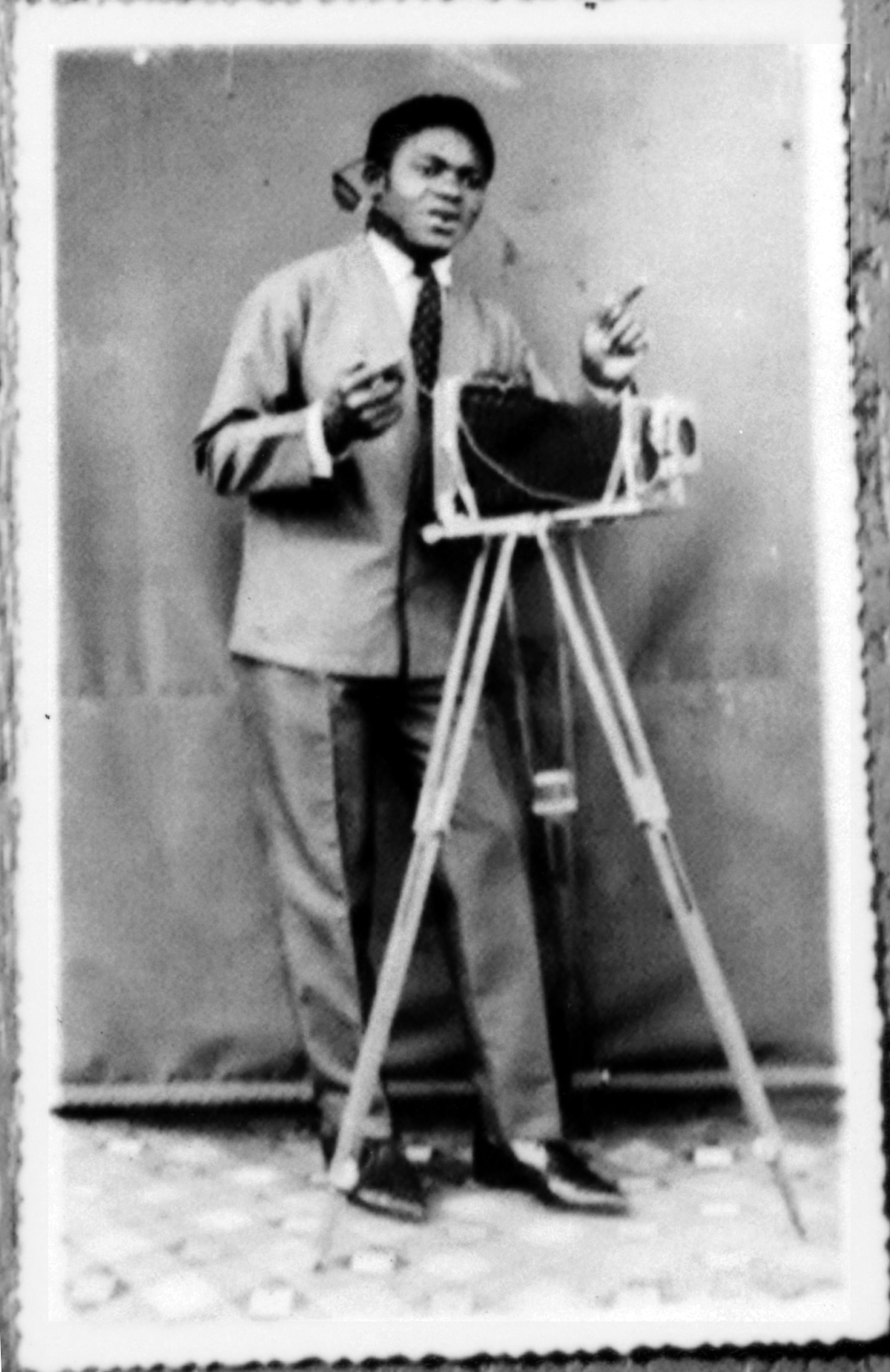
Toussele Jacques with plate camera 1965

The first Mbouda-born photographer working in Mbouda, he was taught photography by a Nigerian-born photographer. He worked in Bamenda at the height of the troubles but then returned to Mbouda where he worked since mid 1960s until his eventual retirement in the early 2000s.

== Death ==
He died in Douala on Friday 30 June 2017.

== Notable achievements ==
His work is in the collection of the Metropolitan Museum of Art, New York and Carleton College and was included in an exhibition on fashion at the Fowler Museum, Los Angeles opening late 2017.

A small exhibition of his work was held at the Pitt Rivers Museum, Oxford curated by Philip Grover & Chris Morton "Studio Cameroon: the everyday photography of Jacques Toussellé". 9 Nov 2007–29 July 2008.

His work was the subject of a major archiving project as part of the British Library’s Endangered Archive Programme. Scanned copies of his works are available online via the BL link. His work is included in a major exhibition at the Fowler Museum at UCLA in the second half of 2021: See Photo Cameroon: Studio Portraiture, 1970s–1990s.

Jacques Toussele is one of 25 photographers with an entry in Amy Sall’s 2024 survey volume (see pp. 138–143). Two of his images are included in Joachim Baur’s 2026 illustrated volume on African Prints: images 112 p280 and 121 p345-6.
