= Mayo-Darlé =

Coordinates: 6°28′N 11°33′E

- Commune and town
- Interactive map of Mayo-Darlé
- Country: Cameroon
- Time zone: UTC+1 (WAT)

Mayo-Darlé is a town and commune in Cameroon. It had a tin mine nearby from c 1935 to c 1980 (see Nguene 1982). One of the commonly known villages in Mayo-Darle are Wouro-Bouguéré and Wouro-Yobi which are known for rearing cattle and farming of corn and vegetables.

== See also ==
- Communes of Cameroon
