= Banyo, Cameroon =

Banyo
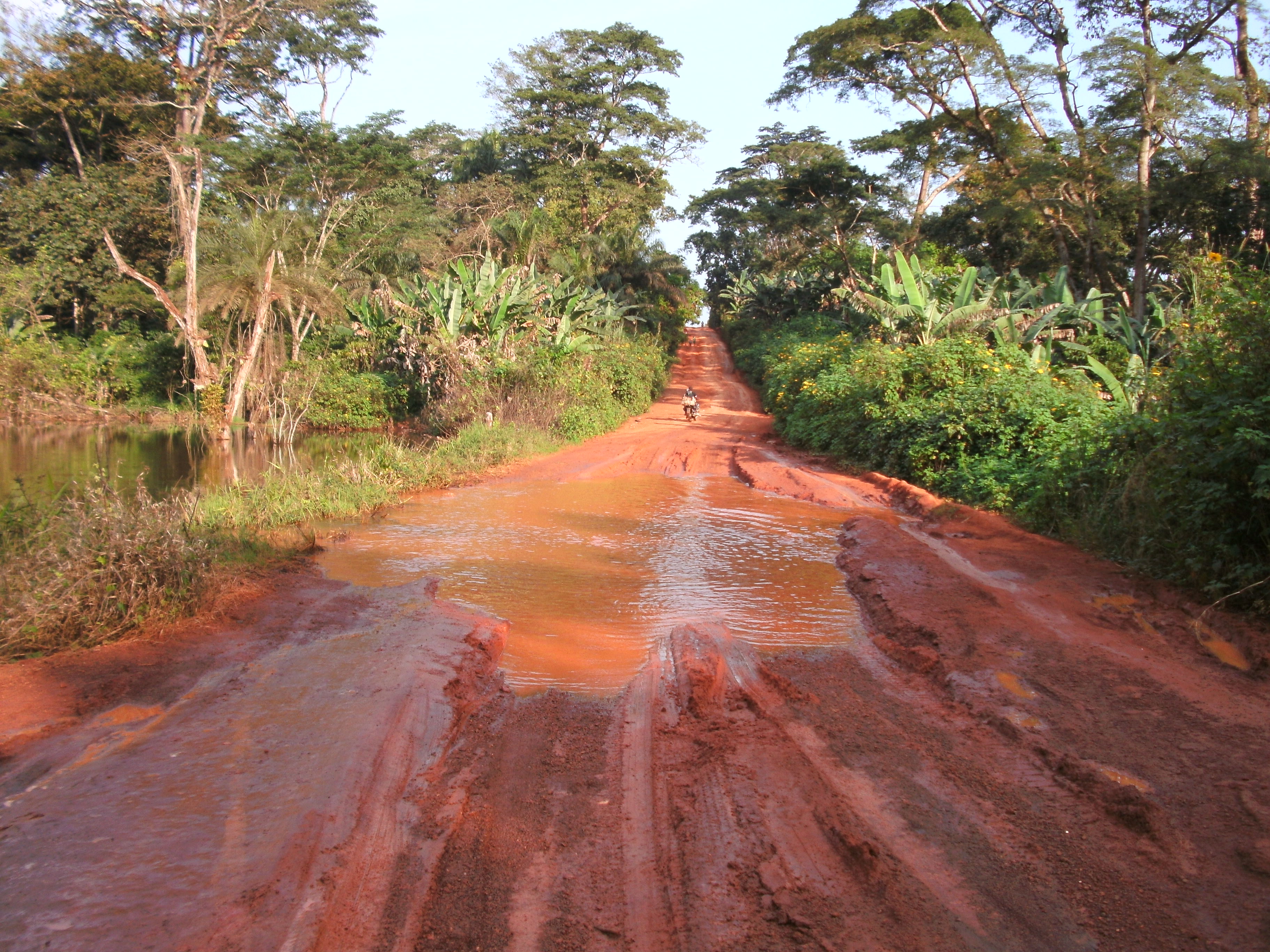
- Tibati-Banyo road

- Location in Cameroon
- Coordinates: 6°46′48″N 11°49′12″E
- Country: Cameroon
- Province: Adamawa Province
- Division: Mayo-Banyo
- Elevation: 1,259 m (4,131 ft)

Banyo (Fula: Banyo 𞤦𞤢𞤲𞤴𞤮) is a town and commune in Adamawa Province, Cameroon. It is located at around 6.78°N 11.82°E, and is predominantly Muslim. Though a government prefect serves in the town, the lamido still holds great sway among the population. The current lamido, S. E. Mohaman Gabdo Yahya, has written his own history (2009). The geographer Jean Hurault has published on the demography of the area, and summarized some of the history in his 1955 work (see references below). In the nineteenth century, Banyo separated from Koncha and Tibati (see Adama, H. & T. M. Bah 2001).

== History ==
- Battle of Banjo in November 1915

== Climate ==
Banyo has a tropical savanna climate (Aw) with moderate to little rainfall from November to March and moderate to heavy rainfall from April to October.

Climate data for Banyo
Month	Jan	Feb	Mar	Apr	May	Jun	Jul	Aug	Sep	Oct	Nov	Dec	Year
Mean daily maximum °C (°F)	30.4 (86.7)	31.5 (88.7)	31.3 (88.3)	28.6 (83.5)	28.1 (82.6)	26.8 (80.2)	25.7 (78.3)	25.8 (78.4)	26.7 (80.1)	27.7 (81.9)	29.1 (84.4)	29.9 (85.8)	28.5 (83.2)
Daily mean °C (°F)	22.8 (73.0)	23.8 (74.8)	24.7 (76.5)	23.0 (73.4)	23.0 (73.4)	22.2 (72.0)	21.7 (71.1)	21.6 (70.9)	21.9 (71.4)	22.2 (72.0)	22.7 (72.9)	22.5 (72.5)	22.7 (72.8)
Mean daily minimum °C (°F)	15.3 (59.5)	16.2 (61.2)	18.2 (64.8)	17.5 (63.5)	18.0 (64.4)	17.6 (63.7)	17.7 (63.9)	17.5 (63.5)	17.1 (62.8)	16.8 (62.2)	16.3 (61.3)	15.1 (59.2)	16.9 (62.5)
Average rainfall mm (inches)	4 (0.2)	14 (0.6)	75 (3.0)	155 (6.1)	204 (8.0)	212 (8.3)	279 (11.0)	267 (10.5)	292 (11.5)	203 (8.0)	30 (1.2)	5 (0.2)	1,740 (68.6)
Source: Climate-Data.org

== See also ==
- Communes of Cameroon
