= Mayo-Banyo =

Coordinates: 6°45′N 11°50′E

- Department
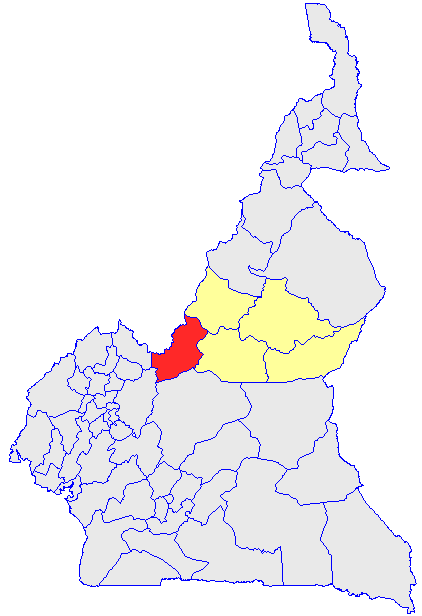
- Department location in Cameroon

- Location within Cameroon
- Country: Cameroon
- Province: Adamawa Province
- Capital: Banyo

Area
  - Total: 8,520 km^{2} (3,290 sq mi)

Population (2001)
  - Total: 134,902
  - Density: 15.8/km^{2} (41.0/sq mi)
- Time zone: UTC+1 (WAT)

Mayo-Banyo is a department of Adamawa Province in Cameroon. The department covers an area of 8,520 km^{2} and as of 2001 had a total population of 134,902. The capital of the department lies at Banyo.

== Subdivisions ==
The department is divided administratively into arrondissements and communes and in turn into villages.

- Bankim
- Banyo
- Mayo-Darlé
