= Ngaoubela =

Ngaoubela N'Gaoubela
- Commune and village
- Location in Cameroon
- Coordinates: 6°31′23.4″N 12°35′56.5″E
- Country: Cameroon
- Region: Adamawa Region
- Department: Djérem

Population
  - Total: > 1,000 (estimates only)
- Time zone: UTC+1 (WAT)
- Area code: CM-AD

Ngaoubela village in the Cameroonian province of Adamawa Region of Cameroon, 15 km west from Tibati and 3 km from the "Axe lourde", i.e. Tibati to Ngaoundéré. The village has more than 1000 inhabitants, some estimates surpass 1500. For its history it is inhabited by a range of ethnicities, among many others there are mainly Gbaya, Mboum, Fulbe and the Haussa.

== Hospital ==
The hospital in Ngaoubela (Hôpital Protestant Ngaoubela) forms part of the Cameroonian Lutheran Evangelic Church (Eglise Evangelique Lutherienne du Cameroun, EELC). It comprises 150 beds in total, and it is equipped with two operating rooms, an ultrasonic device, an X-ray apparatus, a laboratory, running water and emergency power supply. Thus it is the best equipped hospital in the entire Djérem district. Cameroon lacks a functioning social welfare system; people have to pay for health services. In this extremely poor region of Cameroon, this results in financial issues both among patients as for the hospital itself. It mostly relies upon donations from organizations abroad. It is supported by the American Lutheran Church, the Austrian association "Entwicklungspartnerschaft für Kamerun", but also Care and other organizations sporadically aid to ensure the functioning of the most basic health services. The Catholic community of Frastanz enables and supports young Austrian men to do social services. The Austrian medical practitioner Elisabeth Neier has lived and worked in Ngaoubla since 1986.

== History ==
The hospital was founded in 1947 by Norwegian missionaries - originally to be used as a station for treatment of Leprosy. The Lamido from Tibati at that time offered the land, in order to have the patients treated far from the city, to minimize the risk of contagion to healthy locals. After some time, the focus shifted towards operating as a regular hospital, since the hospital became technically and medically well-equipped as it has always enjoyed foreign support from various organizations. This resulted in achieving the status of "district-hospital" (hôpital de district) in 2003, something uncommon among private hospitals in Cameroon. Since 2000, the Chinese have become active in this region. Thus, in about 2007, a new well was built, supplying the village with high quality drinking water from approximately 60 metres below the surface.

== Religion ==
The village is split between the Muslims and Christian Protestant communities. While the Christian community dominates the village in numbers, both are estimated to be equal in the surrounding district. There is one church in Ngaoubela and one small Mosque.
