= Neminaka =

- Coordinates: 6.8833°N 14.1000°E
- Country: Cameroon
- Region: Adamawa
- Department: Vina
- Elevation: 1,276 m (4,186 ft)

Population (2005)
  - Total: 694

Neminaka (also Nemounaka) is a village in the commune of Nyambaka in the Adamawa Region of Cameroon, on the road from Ngaoundéré to Meiganga.

== Population ==
In 1967, Neminaka contained 141 inhabitants, mostly Mboum. At the time of the 2005 census, there were 694 people in the village.

== Bibliography ==
- Jean Boutrais (ed.), Peuples et cultures de l'Adamaoua (Cameroun) : actes du colloque de Ngaoundéré, du 14 au 16 janvier 1992, ORSTOM, Paris; Ngaoundéré-Anthropos, 1993, 316 p. ISBN 2-7099-1167-1
- Dictionnaire des villages de l'Adamaoua, ONAREST, Yaoundé, October 1974, 133 p.
