= Walkossam =

- Coordinates: 7.23°N 12.33°E
- Country: Cameroon
- Region: Adamawa
- Department: Faro-et-Déo
- arrondissement: Tignère

Population (2005)
  - Total: 885

Walkossam is a village in the commune of Tignère, in the Adamawa Region of Cameroon.

== Population ==
In 1967, Walkossam contained 70 inhabitants, mainly Kutin.

At the time of the 2005 census, there were 885 people in the village.

== Bibliography ==
- Jean Boutrais (ed.), Peuples et cultures de l'Adamaoua (Cameroun) : actes du colloque de Ngaoundéré, du 14 au 16 janvier 1992, ORSTOM, Paris; Ngaoundéré-Anthropos, 1993, 316 p. ISBN 2-7099-1167-1
- Dictionnaire des villages de l'Adamaoua, ONAREST, Yaoundé, October 1974, 133 p.
