= Mbum language =

Adamawa language of Cameroon

Mbum
- Mboum, Buna, Mboumtiba and Wuna
- Native to: Cameroon, Central African Republic
- Native speakers: (51,000 cited 1982–1996)
- Language family: Niger–Congo?: Atlantic–Congo; Volta-Congo; North; Adamawa–Ubangi; Adamawa; Mbum–Day; Mbum; Mbum

Language codes
- ISO 639-3: mdd
- Glottolog: mbum1254

Mbum Proper (also Mboum, Buna, Mboumtiba and Wuna) is a Adamawa–Ubangi language of Central Africa. It is spoken by about 50,000 people in Cameroon and the Central African Republic.

== History ==
The Mbum language is spoken by the Mbum people who inhabit Cameroon, the Central African Republic, and Chad. While their origins are unclear, some believe that the Mbum were one of the earliest ethnic groups of the Adamawa Region.

The Mbum people have such a close relationship with the Dii people, and one which has persisted for so long, that outsiders often have a hard time distinguishing them. In the early nineteenth century, both groups came under the rule of the Fulani Muslims, who they are said to have intermarried in large numbers. Despite this, the Mbum and Dii peoples still managed to hold on to their traditional spiritual beliefs until the twentieth century. The Mbum converted to Islam, while the Dii converted to Christianity.

== Varieties ==
Mbum is a complex dialect continuum consisting of several varieties. ALCAM (2012) considers Mbum, Larang, Pana and Gbata to be four distinct but closely related languages. Pana (also spoken in Chad), Karang, Kali-dek and Kuo are eastern varieties that may be separate languages.

To the south, Gbata is spoken in the northern part of the arrondissement of Bélabo in Lom-et-Djerem department, Eastern Region. There, it is spoken in Woutchaba and Deng-Deng, located to the west and east of the Sanaga River, respectively. Blench (2006) considers Gbete (Gbata) to be a separate language.

== Distribution ==
Mbum is spoken in:

- Adamaoua Region
  - Vina department (Ngaoundéré and Mbe communes)
  - Djerem department (Ngaoundal and Tibati communes)
  - Faro-et-Déo department (Tignère communes)
- North Region
  - Mayo-Rey department (Touboro commune)
  - Faro department (Poli commune)

== Phonology ==
=== Consonants ===
		Labial	Alveolar	Palatal	Velar	Labio- velar	Glottal
Nasal		m	n	ɲ	ŋ		
Plosive/ Affricate	voiceless	p	t		k	k͡p	
Plosive/ Affricate	voiced	b	d		ɡ	ɡ͡b	
Plosive/ Affricate	prenasal	ᵐb	ⁿd		ᵑɡ	ᵑᵐɡ͡b	
Plosive/ Affricate	implosive	ɓ	ɗ				
Fricative	voiceless	f	s				h
Fricative	voiced	v	z				
Fricative	prenasal	ᶬv	ⁿz				
Trill/Tap		ⱱ	r				
Lateral			l				
Approximant				j		w	

=== Vowels ===
	Front	Central	Back
Close	i ĩ		u ũ
Mid	e		o
Open		a ã	
