= Mbakaou =

- Coordinates: 6.31667°N 12.8167°E
- Country: Cameroon
- Region: Adamawa
- Department: Djérem

Mbakaou is a village in the Adamawa Region of Cameroon. It is part of the commune of Tibati. The economy is based mainly on fishing.

The town has a hydroelectric power plant with an energy output of 213 Kw operated by Enéo, Cameroon's national electricity service. The plant is designed supplies energy to around 300 households in eight communes. From 2019 to 2022, a dam was built in Mbakaou, feeding the artificial Lake Mbakaou. The dam is one of three built on the Sanaga river, the longest river in Cameroon.

== Bibliography ==
- P. Dubreuil, J. Guiscafre, J.-F. Nouvelot, J.-C. Olivry, « Le Djerem à Mbakaou », in Le bassin de la rivière Sanaga, ORSTOM, Paris, 1975, p. 134
- Sirri Gerrard, « Fishery and Gender in Mbakaou, a Northern Cameroonian Village », in Mega-Tchad, 1994, No. 2, p. 43-46.

== See also ==
- Lake Mbakaou
