= Mbakaou Hydroelectric Power Station =

Power station in Cameroon

Mbakaou Power Station
- Map of Cameroon showing the location of Mbakaou Power Station
- Country: Cameroon
- Location: Mbakaou, Djérem Department, Adamawa Province
- Coordinates: 06°18′17″N 12°48′31″E
- Purpose: Power
- Status: Operational
- Construction began: September 2019
- Opening date: December 2021
- Construction cost: €6.8 million
- Owner: IED Invest
- Operator: IED Invest

Dam and spillways
- Impounds: Djérem River

Power Station
- Commission date: December 2021
- Type: Run-of-the-river
- Turbines: Kaplan type: 2 x 0.74 MW
- Installed capacity: 1.48 MW (1,980 hp)
- Annual generation: 11.2 GWh

The Mbakaou Power Station is an operational 1.48 megawatts (1,980 hp) mini hydroelectric power station in Cameroon. Commercially commissioned in December 2021, the renewable energy project was jointly developed by the Government of Cameroon, in collaboration with IED Invest, an independent power producer (IPP) based in France, and Eneo Cameroon S.A., the Cameroonian national electric distribution parastatal company. The power generated at this power plant, amounting to 11.2 GWh annually, is sold to Eneo Cameroon, under a 20-year power purchase agreement, and is distributed to an estimated 40,000 people in the Adamawa Province of Cameroon.

== Location ==
The power station is located across the Djérem River, which is a tributary of the Sanaga River, in the town of Mbakaou, in Djérem Department, in Cameroon's Adamawa Province. Mbakaou is located approximately 34 kilometres (21 mi) southeast of Tibati, the nearest large town. This is approximately 489 kilometres (304 mi), northeast of Yaounde, the national capital city.

== Overview ==
The installed capacity at this mini hydro installation is two 0.74 MW Kaplan type turbines, for maximum capacity of 1.48 megawatts. The power station is owned by IED Invest, an IPP headquartered in Francheville, France. The power generated here is sold to Eneo Cameroon, the national public electric utility company.

The power generated at this power station is evacuated via a 40 kilometres (25 mi) long 30 kV medium voltage transmission line from the power station to an Eneo Cameroon substation, where the energy enters the national electricity grid.

== History ==
Construction began in September 2019. The completed mini hydro installation was commercially commissioned in December 2021.

== Construction costs and funding ==
The construction cost was reported as €6.8 million (XaF 4.5 billion). Funding for the project was sourced from the European Union, French Facility for Global Environment and the BGFIBank Group, headquartered in Libreville, Gabon.

== Other consideration ==
There is a possibility of increasing capacity at this power station in the future, to 2.8 megawatts.

== See also ==
- List of power stations in Cameroon
