= Lamido Grand Mosque =

Mosque in Ngaoundéré, Cameroon

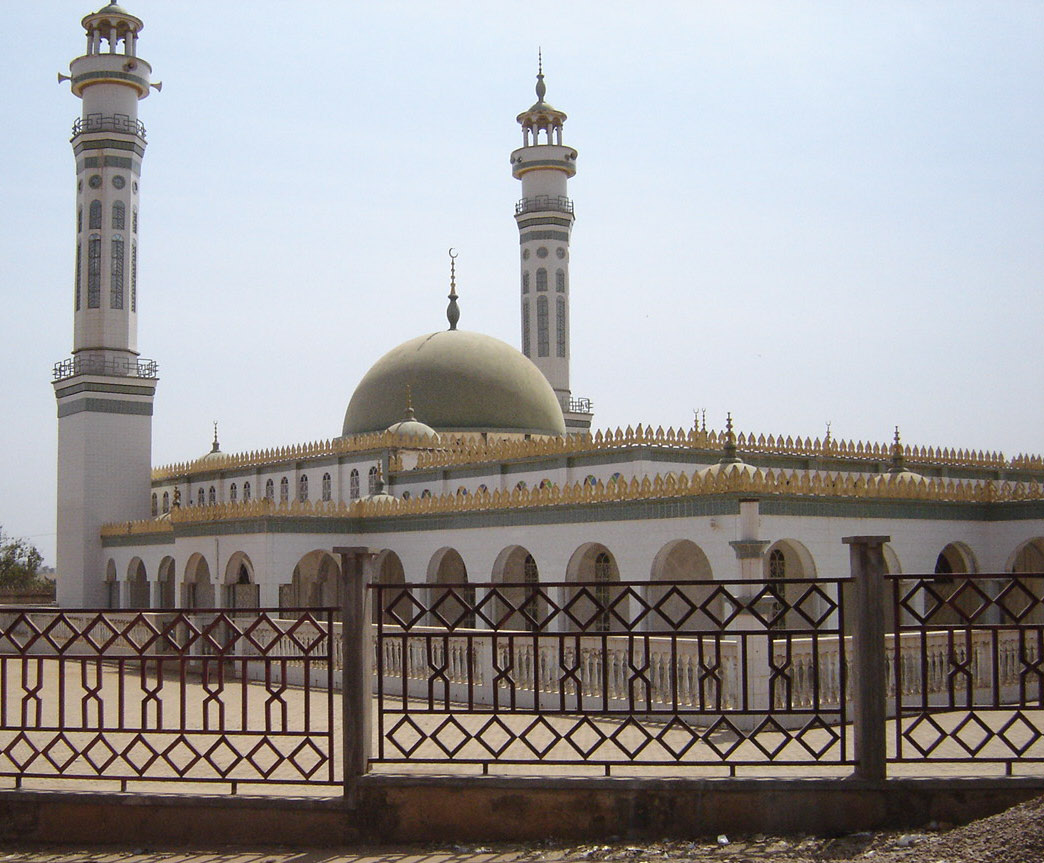

- Location of the mosque in Cameroon

Religion
- Affiliation: Islam
- Ecclesiastical or organizational status: Mosque
- Status: Active

Location
- Location: Ngaoundéré, Adamawa
- Country: Cameroon
- Interactive map of Lamido Grand Mosque
- Coordinates: 7°19′15″N 13°35′08″E

Architecture
- Type: Mosque

Specifications
- Dome: 1
- Minaret: 2

The Lamido Grand Mosque is a mosque in Ngaoundéré, Cameroon.

== See also ==
- Islam in Cameroon
- List of mosques in Cameroon
