= List of mosques in Cameroon =

This is a list of mosques in Cameroon.

Name	Images	Location	Year (CE)	Remarks
Lamido Grand Mosque		Ngaoundéré		
New-Bell Central Mosque		Douala		

== See also ==
- Islam in Cameroon
- List of mosques in Africa
