= René Philombé =

Cameroonian writer (1930–2001)

René Philombe
- Born: 13 November 1930; Ngaoundéré, Cameroon
- Died: 25 October 2001 (aged 70); Yaoundé, Cameroon

René Philombé (René Philombe), pen name of Philippe Louis Ombedé (13 November 1930 – 25 October 2001), born in the city of Ngaoundéré, was a Cameroonian writer, journalist, poet, novelist, and playwright who mostly wrote in French. He was one of the founders of the Association of Cameroonian Poets and Writers (APEC) of which he was the secretary for 20 years. He received the Mottart Prize from the Académie Française and the Fonlon-Nichols prize from the African Literature Association.

== Biography ==
=== Early years ===
René Philombe's father was Nkoulou, writer-performer, a descendant of the Nkoulou, Batschenga chiefs. His mother was Princess Berthe Manyan, granddaughter of Tidadi, king of the Babouté. His name received at birth was Yaka Nkoulou, but upon arrival of a white priest, his father renamed him to Philippe Louis Ombedé, whom the author transformed into a pen name René Philombe : rené (de renaître) Phi-L-Ombe, sometimes written in French with accent: René Philombé.

He began high school in Yaoundé in 1945. He became a Marxist there and was dismissed from it in 1946. He continued as an autodidact and followed correspondence courses, among others at the school of arts and sciences in Paris. His first publications were from this time. His Araignée disgracie won a prize for the best tale from the Committee of Cultural Expression of France overseas. He also founded a cultural association in his father's village, where he then lived.

In 1949 or 1950, he was admitted to the competitive examination for police secretary and became a police officer in Douala. Straddling two cultures, soaked in French literature and texts from the Negritude movement, he was both a nationalist and a Marxist, and he was secretly engaged in the Union of the Peoples of Cameroon (UPC). He attended, among other things, a pan-Cameroonian assembly in 1951. This earned him a disciplinary correction, but did not prevent him from being the first class of the Yaoundé police academy in 1952.

=== Professional writer ===
In 1955, struck by poliomyelitis which left his legs paralyzed for life, he had to leave the service. He then devoted himself to Cameroonian literature on which he began a documentation which would result years later, in 1984, in the publication of the monumental book, The Cameroonian book and its authors: a contribution to the literary history of the United Republic of Cameroon from 1895 to the present day with a bio-bibliographic record of the authors.

He wrote Lettres de ma cambuse(published in 1964) in his first years of paralytic. fine observations of the life of his village, in the same vein as Lettres de mon moulin by Alphonse Daudet. In 1957 of 1959, he created a French newspaper, The voice of the citizen, and a newspaper in Ewondo, Bebela ebug. He founded the Association of Cameroonian Poets and Writers (APEC) with some friends in 1960, and acted as its secretary from 1960 to 1981.

=== Prison and censorship ===
Cameroon became independent in 1960 under the first president Ahmadou Ahidjo of the Union Camerounais. Ahidjo considered the members of the Union of the Peoples of Cameroon (UPC) as masquisards or rebels. René Philombe was subjected to censorship, then he was put in prison for several months in 1961. There he wrote Choc anti-choc: a novel in poems which would not be accepted for publication until 1978. In 1963, Philombe was accused of having recreated the UPC and he returned to prison.

=== Author and editor ===
Philombe's first books were published by Éditions CLE in Yaoundé, created in 1963 with the help of Dutch and German Protestant churches. For greater freedom of publication, and for the sake of promoting Cameroonian literature, René Philombe created his own publishing house Semences Africaines in 1972, which allowed him to edit his own texts for a large part which had remained unpublished until then.

== Rewards ==
In 1965, he received the Mottart Prize from the Académie Française for all of his work.

In 1993, he was the first, along with Mongo Beti, to receive the Fonlon-Nichols Prize from the African Literature Association.

== Works ==
- 1964 Lettres de ma cambuse, Éditions Clé, Yaoundé.
- 1965 Le hibou, Editions APEC.
- 1966 Sola ma chérie', Éditions Abbia, Yaoundé.
- 1966 La Voix des poètes camerounais (anthologie par R.Philombe), Éditions APEC, Yaoundé.
- 1969 Un sorcier blanc à Zangali, Éditions Clé, Yaoundé.
- 1971 Histoires queue-de-chat : quelques scènes de la vie camerounaise, Yaoundé : Éditions Clé, 1971.
- 1973 Les blanc partis, les nègres dansent, Éditions Semences africaines, Yaoundé.
- 1977 Petites gouttes de chant pour créer l'homme (poèmes), Éditions Semences africaines, Yaoundé.
- 1977 Le livre camerounais et ses auteurs : une contribution à l'histoire littéraire du Cameroun avec notice bio-bibliographique, Éditions Semences africaines, Yaoundé.
- 1978 Les trouble-fêtes d'Africapolis (tragédie), Éditions Semences africaines, Yaoundé.
- 1978 Choc anti-choc : roman en poèmes : écrits de prison 1961, Éditions Semences africaines, Yaoundé.
- 1982 Espaces essentiels, Éditions Silex, Paris.
- 1984 Le livre camerounais et ses auteurs : une contribution à l'histoire littéraire de la République Unie du Cameroun de 1895 à nos jours avec une notice bio-bibliographique des auteurs, Éditions Semences Africaines, Yaoundé
- 1994 Nnan Ndenn Bobo : conte politico-philosophique : suivi de Lamentations d'un joueur de mvet, poème, Éditions du CRAC, Yaoundé.
- 2001 Le testament de René Philombe, 1930-2001 : entretien vidéo K7 du 28 mai 2001 avec Stella Engama Éditions FUSEE, Yaoundé.
- 2002 Bedi-Ngula, l'ancien maquisard, E. Breitinger, Universität Bayreuth
