= Tibati =

- Commune and town
- Location in Cameroon
- Coordinates: 6°28′N 12°38′E
- Country: Cameroon
- Region: Adamawa Region
- Department: Djérem
- City Founded: 1821
- Commune Established: 31 Dec 1960

Government
  - Type: Commune / Traditional Lamidate
  - Lamido: Amadou Dahratou
  - Lamido: Mohamadou Hadi Barkindo
- Elevation: 838 m (2,749 ft)

Population (2023)
  - Total: 80,000
- Time zone: UTC+1 (WAT)

Tibati (Fulfulde: Tibati 𞤼𞤭𞤦𞤢𞤼𞤭) is a town and commune in the Adamawa Region, Cameroon. The town and region are ruled by a local monarch, the Lamido.

== History ==
The Vute and Mboum people are the native inhabitants of the Tibati area.

The town of Tibati was founded in the 1820s by Hamman Sambo, a flag-bearer of Modibo Adama, in turn a vassal of Muhammad Bello, leader of the Sokoto Caliphate. His group of Fulani immigrants intermarried with local communities, built institutions integrating local traditions with Fulbe ones, and waged jihad against those who refused to convert to Islam. At the southernmost point of the Adamawa Emirate, Tibati was a center of slave raiding and perhaps the most powerful Lamidate in the region.

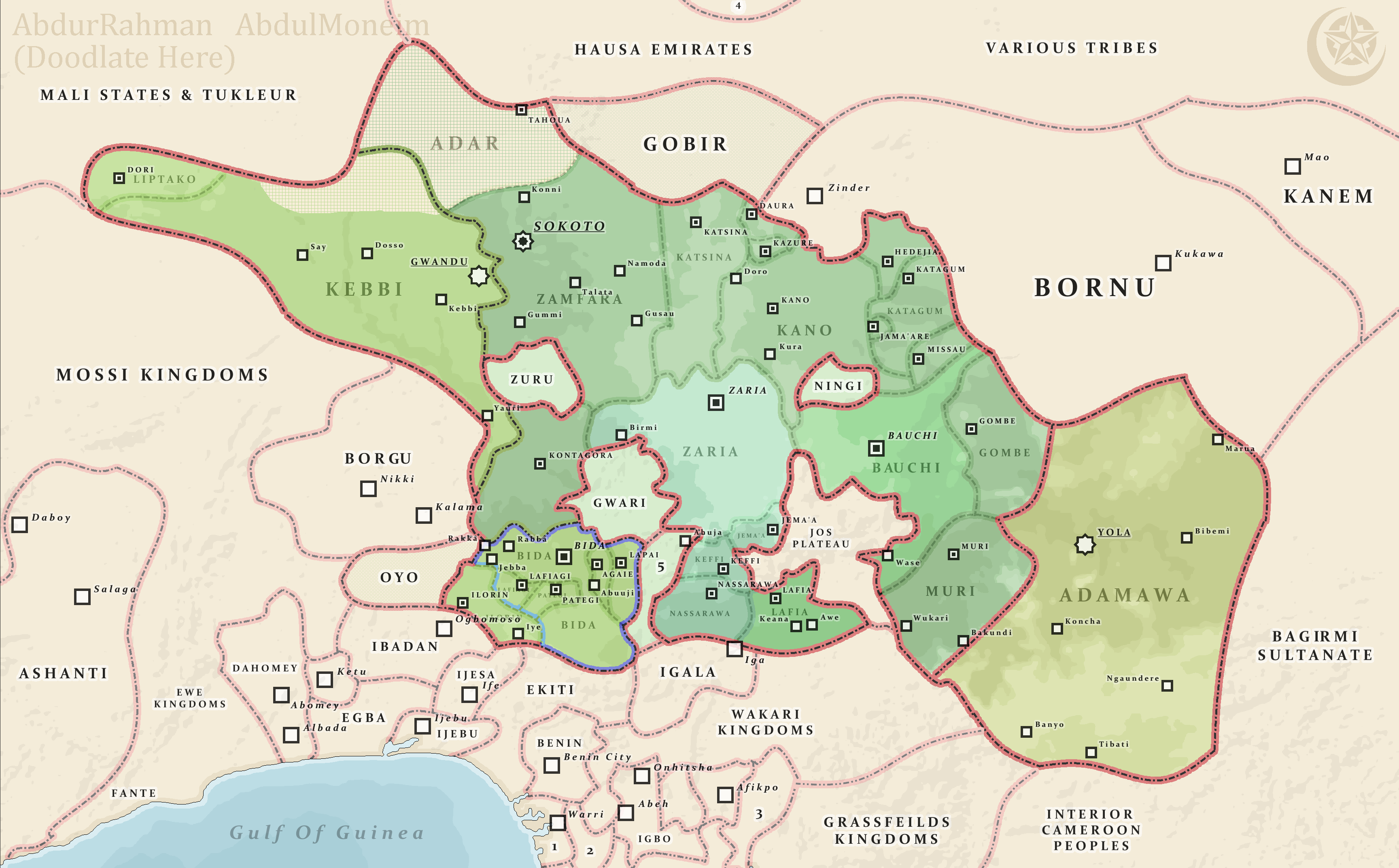
The Sokoto Caliphate, with the Adamawa Emirate to the east. Tibati is shown near the southeasternmost border.

Sambo attempted for years to set up Tibati as a direct vassal of Sokoto rather than reporting to Adama. In 1841, after Abu Bakr Atiku succeeded to the sultanate, he finally succeeded. The next year, however, Atiku died and his successor Ali Babba bin Bello reversed the decision. Relations between Tibati, the Adamawa Emir, and the other Lamidos of the region were often rocky. For example in the 1850s the Emir rallied the neighboring districts in a war against Tibati to punish the Lamido for having attacked them.

In the early years of German colonization of Cameroon, the Lamidate of Tibati, particularly their Vute vassals, was an obstacle to their commercial penetration of the Adamawa plateau.

In early 1899 Oltwig von Kamptz led a German force north from Yaoundé to take the town of Yoko, and from there sent a force to Tibati. Lamido Muhammad was unpopular with his Fulani constituents and could not rely on the Emir for support, so he evacuated the cattle and valuables. The Germans, led by Lieutenant Hans Dominik, sacked the city on March 10.

The German forces did not occupy Tibati but focused on strengthening their position by allying with the Tikar people, longtime enemies of Tibati, and ensuring the neutrality of other Lamidos through diplomacy. Although Lamido Muhammad attempted to negotiate a peace, the Germans launched a surprise attack on Tibati and deposed him. He was replaced by his cousin Chirona, pronounced "Sultan of Tibati in the name of his Majesty the Emperor and King" (of Germany). The invaders used Tibati and Yoko as bases for subjugating the rest of the Adamawa region.

A dam on the Meng river was built in the nearby village of Mbakaou in 1969, creating lake Mbakaou.

Lamido Hamadou Bello died on May 12, 2023. He was succeeded on June 17 by Mohamadou Hadi Barkindo, son of the 18th Lamido Mohamadou Barkindo (r. 1981-2004). As per tradition, the Faadah (electoral college) of the lamidate heard the proposals of 22 candidates before selecting Barkindo as the 21st Lamido of Tibati.

== Economy and Society ==
The most notable economic activity in the region is the fishery industry in lake Mbakaou. It is distributed all over Cameroon, mainly to the capital Yaoundé. Historically, Tibati hosted an important market, particular for ivory. The Mbakaou Power Station is a mini hydroelectric power station located approx. 34 kilometres (21 mi) southeast of the town.

The town's medical needs are covered by a large missionary hospital in Ngaoubela, approximately 15 km in the north, following N15 / N6 into the direction of Ngaoundal. This hospital is led by an Austrian physician and supported by several donor organisations in Vorarlberg, Austria and the United States. An exchange of volunteers from Europe and North America is taking place on a regular basis. The smaller Tibati Baptist Health Centre opened on March 18, 2019.

== See also ==
- Communes of Cameroon
