= Lake Mbakaou =

Lake in Cameroon

Coordinates: 6.398°N 12.791°E

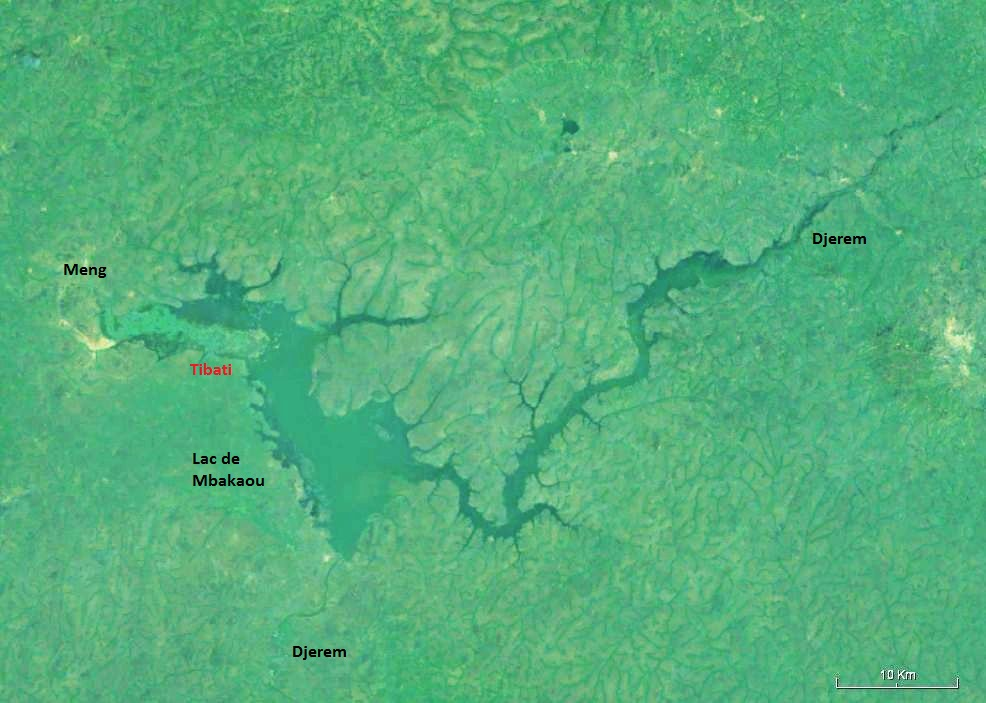
NASA image

Lake Mbakaou, also known as Mbakaou reservoir, is an artificial lake in Cameroon. The lake was formed by the construction of a dam and is fed by the Sanaga River. The closest settlement is the fishing village of Mbakaou. The lake's surface area has been calculated at 500 km^{2}, but can fluctuate as the volume of the lake changes.
