= Galim-Tignère =

- Commune and town
- Location in Cameroon
- Coordinates: 7.0992°N 12.4733°E
- Country: Cameroon
- Region: Adamawa
- Department: Faro-et-Déo
- Time zone: UTC+1 (WAT)

Galim-Tignère is a town and commune in Cameroon.

== See also ==
- Communes of Cameroon
