= Kontcha =

Town and commune in Adamawa Region, Cameroon

Coordinates: 7°58′N 12°14′E

- Commune and town
- Interactive map of Kontcha
- Country: Cameroon
- Region: Adamawa Region
- Time zone: UTC+1 (WAT)

Kontcha is a town and commune in Cameroon.

== See also ==
- Communes of Cameroon
