= Nyambaka =

Coordinates: 6°53′N 14°06′E

- Commune and town
- Interactive map of Nyambaka
- Country: Cameroon
- Time zone: UTC+1 (WAT)

Nyambaka is a town and commune in Cameroon.
