= Ngaoundal =

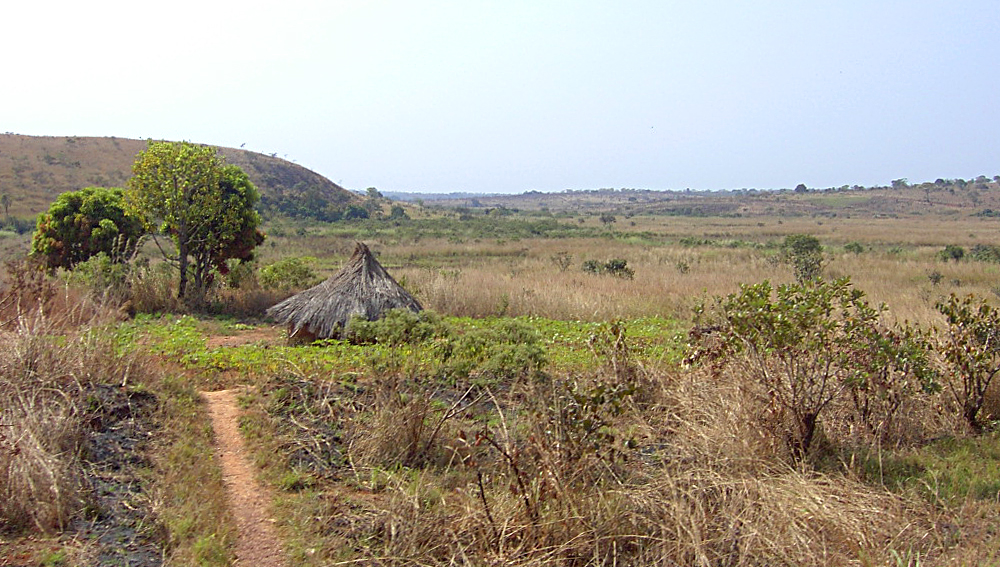
- Hills near Ngaoundal

- Location in Cameroon
- Coordinates: 6°30′N 13°16′E
- Country: Cameroon
- Province: Adamawa Province
- Department: Djérem
- Elevation: 1,006 m (3,301 ft)

Population (2012)
  - Total: 34,971

Ngaoundal is a town in the Adamawa Province of Cameroon. It is located at 6° 30" North, 13° 16" East. The town is home to a regional airport. Bauxite is mined nearby.

== Transport ==
The town is served by the Cameroon Railway which is crossed by a paved highway.

== See also ==
- Communes of Cameroon
