= Faro-et-Déo =

Coordinates: 07°20′51″N 12°27′55″E

- Department
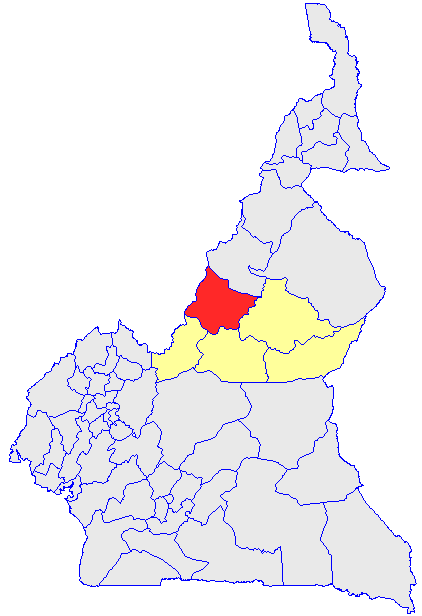
- Department location in Cameroon

- Location within Cameroon
- Country: Cameroon
- Province: Adamawa Province
- Capital: Tignere

Area
  - Total: 10,435 km^{2} (4,029 sq mi)

Population (2001)
  - Total: 66,442
  - Density: 6.3672/km^{2} (16.491/sq mi)
- Time zone: UTC+1 (WAT)

Faro-et-Déo is a department of Adamawa Province in Cameroon. The department covers an area of 10,435 km^{2} and as of 2001 had a total population of 66,442. The capital of the department lies at Tignere.

== Subdivisions ==
The department is divided administratively into arrondissements and communes and in turn into villages.

=== Arrondissements ===
- Galim-Tignère
- Mayo-Baléo (1 district : Kontcha)
- Tignère

=== Communes ===
The department has 4 communes:

- Galim-Tignère
- Mayo-Baléo
- Tignère
- Kontcha

== See also ==
- Communes of Cameroon
