= Tignère =

Coordinates: 7°22′N 12°39′E

- Commune and town
- Interactive map of Tignère
- Country: Cameroon
- Region: Adamawa Region

Government
  - Mayor: Abdoulkarim Youssouf
- Time zone: UTC+1 (WAT)

Tignère is a town and commune in Cameroon.

== Climate ==
Tignère has a tropical savanna climate (Aw) with little to no rain from November to March and heavy rainfall from April to October.

Climate data for Tignère
Month	Jan	Feb	Mar	Apr	May	Jun	Jul	Aug	Sep	Oct	Nov	Dec	Year
Mean daily maximum °C (°F)	29.8 (85.6)	31.1 (88.0)	31.6 (88.9)	30.1 (86.2)	28.6 (83.5)	27.1 (80.8)	25.9 (78.6)	25.9 (78.6)	26.7 (80.1)	28.1 (82.6)	29.1 (84.4)	29.6 (85.3)	28.6 (83.6)
Daily mean °C (°F)	21.1 (70.0)	22.5 (72.5)	24.2 (75.6)	24.0 (75.2)	23.1 (73.6)	22.2 (72.0)	21.4 (70.5)	21.4 (70.5)	21.6 (70.9)	22.1 (71.8)	21.7 (71.1)	20.9 (69.6)	22.2 (71.9)
Mean daily minimum °C (°F)	12.4 (54.3)	13.9 (57.0)	16.8 (62.2)	17.9 (64.2)	17.7 (63.9)	17.3 (63.1)	17.0 (62.6)	17.0 (62.6)	16.6 (61.9)	16.2 (61.2)	14.4 (57.9)	12.2 (54.0)	15.8 (60.4)
Average rainfall mm (inches)	1 (0.0)	4 (0.2)	45 (1.8)	132 (5.2)	187 (7.4)	221 (8.7)	276 (10.9)	281 (11.1)	265 (10.4)	146 (5.7)	13 (0.5)	1 (0.0)	1,572 (61.9)
Source: Climate-Data.org
