= Djérem =

- Department
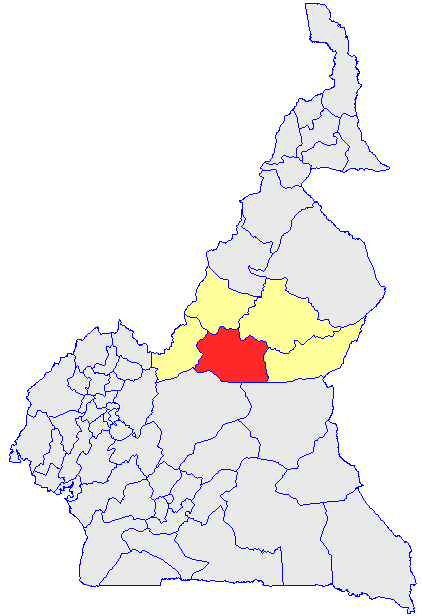
- Department location in Cameroon
- Country: Cameroon
- Province: Adamawa Province
- Capital: Tibati

Area
  - Total: 13,283 km^{2} (5,129 sq mi)

Population (2001)
  - Total: 89,382
  - Density: 6.7291/km^{2} (17.428/sq mi)
- Time zone: UTC+1 (WAT)

Djérem is a department of Adamawa Province in Cameroon. The department covers an area of 13,283 km^{2} and as of 2001 had a total population of 89,382. The capital of the department lies at Tibati.

It is named after the Djérem River.

== Subdivisions ==
The department is divided administratively into arrondissements, communes and in turn into villages.

- Ngaoundal
- Tibati

== See also ==
- Communes of Cameroon
