= Ngaoundéré =

- City
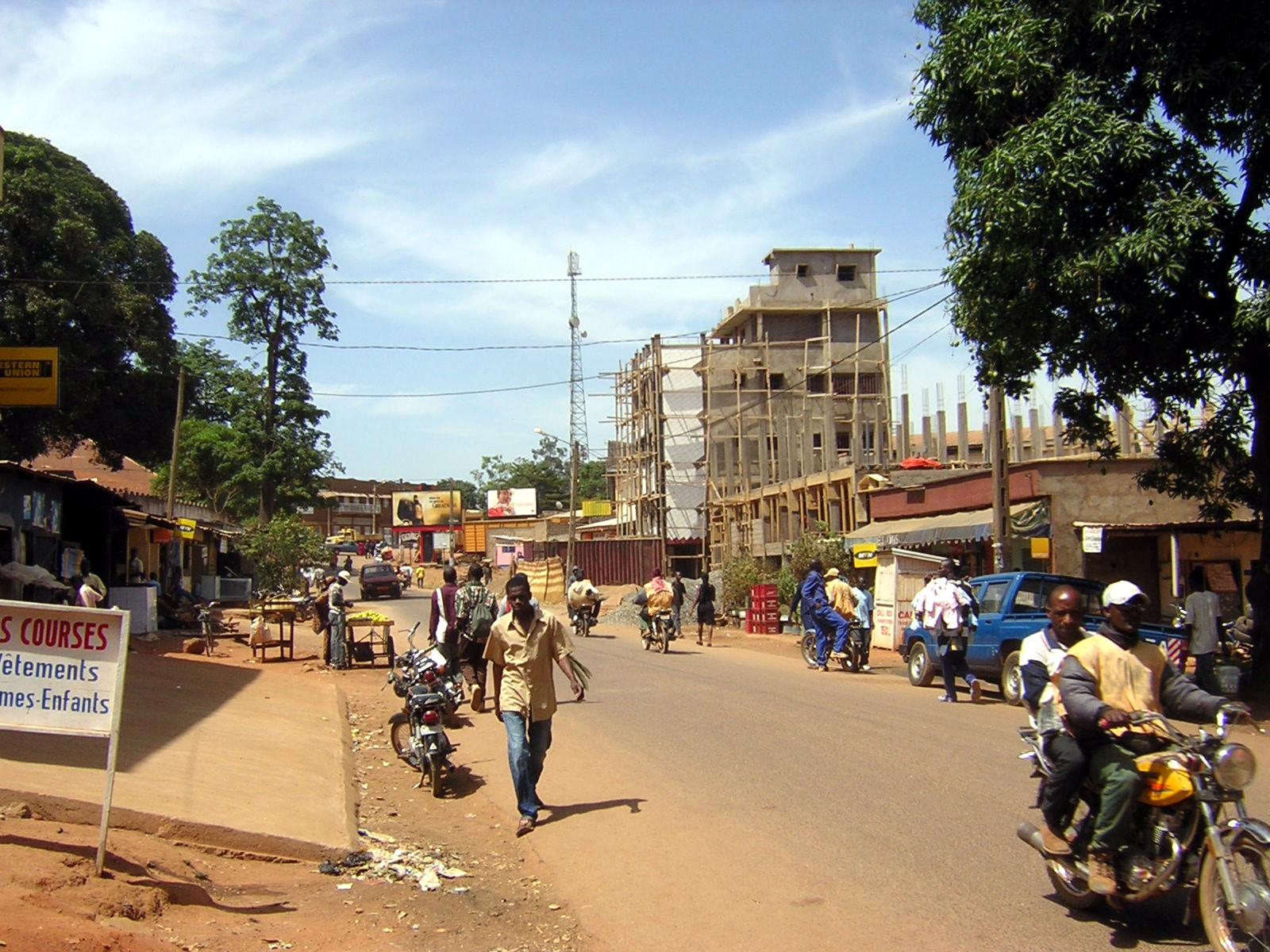
- Street scene in Ngaounderé

- Location in Cameroon
- Coordinates: 7°20′17″N 13°34′00″E
- Country: Cameroon
- Region: Adamawa
- Department: Vina

Government
  - Mayor: Salifou Kachalla
  - Deputy Mayor: Dikoua Shehou
- Elevation: 1,212 m (3,976 ft)

Population (2023)(Census)
  - Total: 1,200,000
- Time zone: UTC+01:00 (WAT)
- Climate: Aw

Ngaoundéré or N'Gaoundéré (Fula: N'gamdere, نغَمْدٜرٜ, 𞤲'𞤺𞤢𞤥𞤣𞤫𞥅𞤪𞤫𞥅) is the capital of the Adamawa Region of Cameroon. It had a population of 152,700 at the 2005 census. According to the film Les Mairuuwas – Maitre de l'eau produced by the University of Tromsø, the population has rapidly risen to 1,200,000 (as of October 2023) owing to mass immigration from the Central African Republic and the perceived danger from Boko Haram in northern Cameroon.

The city lies at the northern end of the railway to Yaoundé and is also home to Ngaoundéré Airport. Attractions in the city include the Lamido Palace and the Lamido Grand Mosque. The town is named after a nearby mountain on its eponymous plateau; the mountain's name is the Mbum word for "navel mountain". "Ngaou" mean mountain in Mbum, and "Ndare" mean navel in Mbum language. Because of this some people call the navel of Adamwa. Mount Ngaoundéré is rockey. On the top of mountain, large stone lies on it. Ngaoundéré is close to Lake Tison.

== History ==
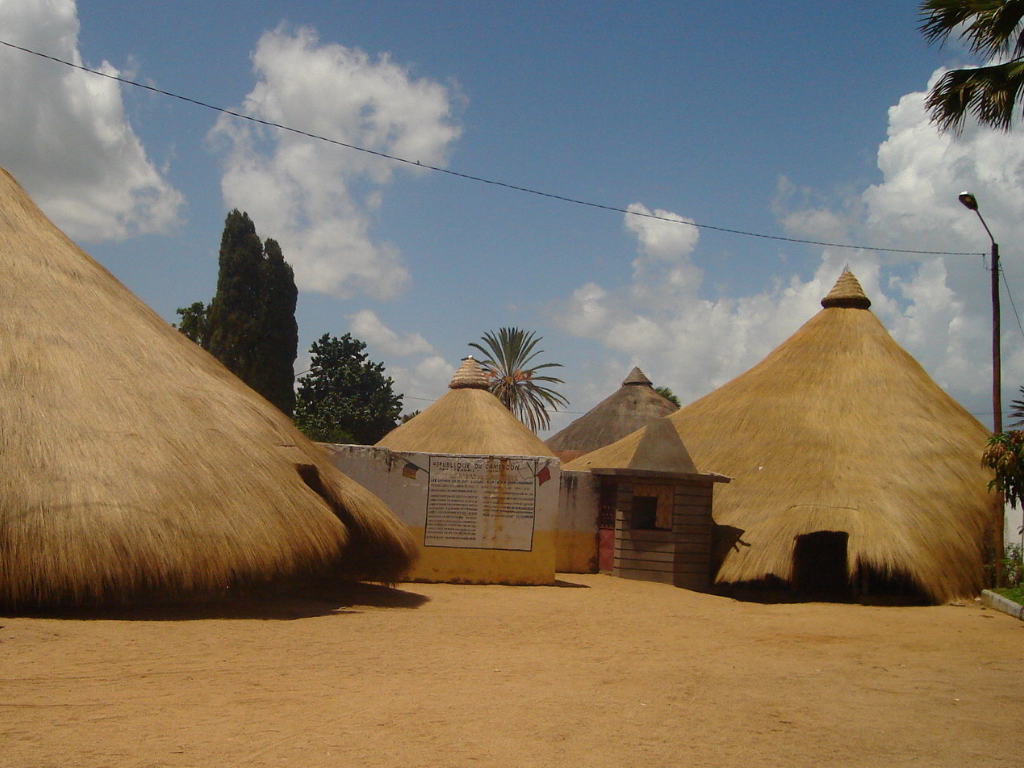
Lamidat de Ngaoundéré

The site of modern Ngaoundéré had previously been occupied by a Mbum capital, but the present city dates from around 1835, when it was founded by the Fulani leader Ardo Njobdi. The Fula continued to hold the area during the 19th century and Ngaoundéré was visited in 1882 by Robert Flegel. Ardo Muhammadu Abbo signed a protection agreement with the German explorer Siegfried Passarge in 1894 and a series of agreements between Germany, Britain, and France placed the area within Germany's sphere of influence. The German army occupied the town (period German: Ngaundere) by main force on August 20, 1901. On July 29, 1915, the town was the scene of a skirmish between German and British troops during World War I's Kamerun campaign. Following the war, the area fell under French occupation until the independence of Cameroon.

=== Population ===
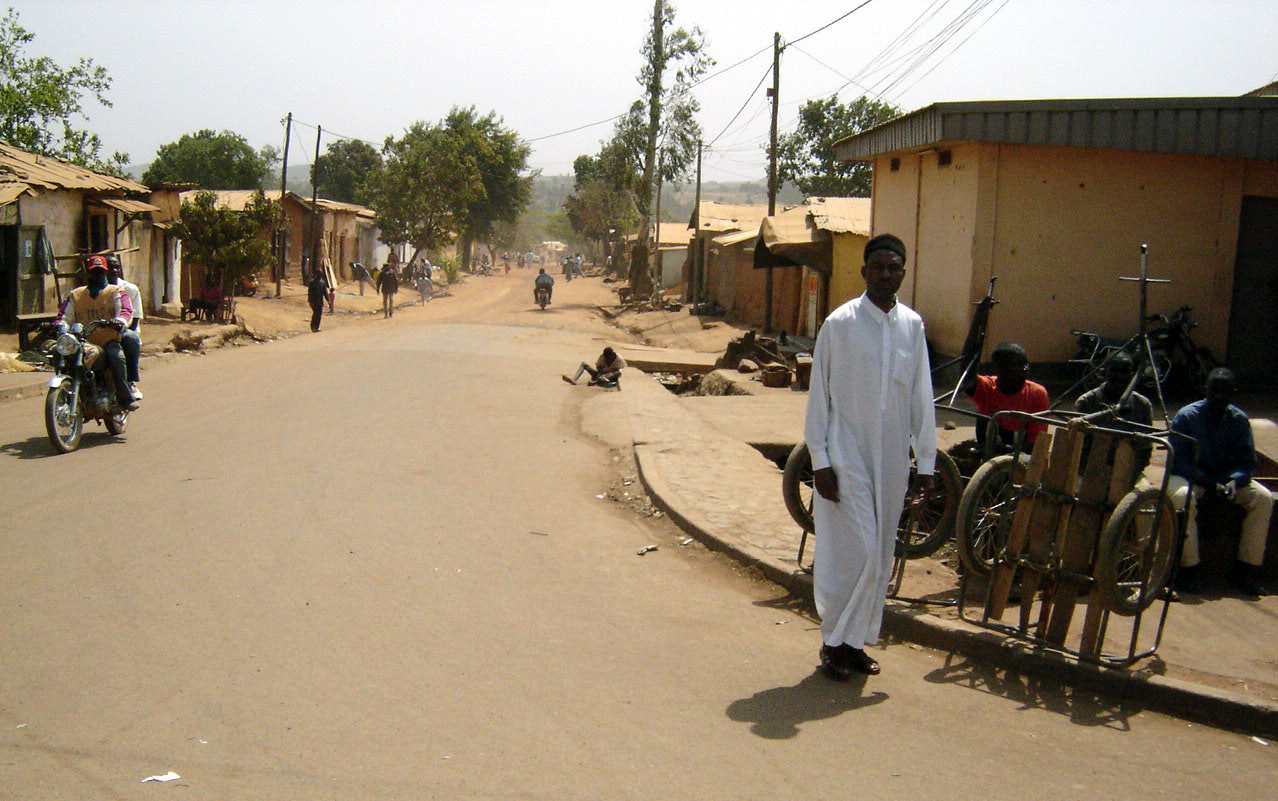

The Mbum were the earlier population of the surrounding area before the 19th-century invasion of the Fulani. The Fulani have ruled the area since the foundation of Ngaoundere in approximately 1835 in conjunction with the Mbum, who are considered a protected people according to Islamic law. The ruler is required to be descended from the ruling Fulani family on his father's side, extending back to the first Lamido of Ngaoundéré Ardo Njobdi of Boundang. On his mother's side, he is expected to be an Mbum descendant, so that he may represent the entirety of the population. Being the largest city in the Adamawa Region by far, Ngaoundéré attracts numerous settlers from the surrounding rural areas, including Díi from further north, Gbaya from the Meiganga area and Pere from the west. The population expanded greatly after completion of the railway in 1973, with a large percentage of the additional population originating from outside of Adamawa Region. This is evident in the ironic dichotomy between the so-called Grand Marché, adjacent to the Grand Mosqué and housing mainly local merchants, and the much larger Petit Marché located to the northwest in a neighbourhood housing a population largely originating in the southern regions of Cameroon.

== Climate ==
Ngaoundéré has a tropical savanna climate (Köppen climate classification Aw).

Climate data for Ngaoundéré (1961–1990, extremes 1928-present)
Month	Jan	Feb	Mar	Apr	May	Jun	Jul	Aug	Sep	Oct	Nov	Dec	Year
Record high °C (°F)	36.0 (96.8)	38.0 (100.4)	39.0 (102.2)	39.0 (102.2)	38.0 (100.4)	33.0 (91.4)	37.4 (99.3)	30.5 (86.9)	32.0 (89.6)	37.0 (98.6)	35.0 (95.0)	36.0 (96.8)	39.0 (102.2)
Mean daily maximum °C (°F)	30.1 (86.2)	31.6 (88.9)	32.1 (89.8)	30.6 (87.1)	28.9 (84.0)	27.4 (81.3)	26.2 (79.2)	26.2 (79.2)	27.0 (80.6)	28.5 (83.3)	29.6 (85.3)	30.0 (86.0)	29.0 (84.2)
Daily mean °C (°F)	20.5 (68.9)	22.2 (72.0)	24.1 (75.4)	24.1 (75.4)	23.1 (73.6)	22.1 (71.8)	21.5 (70.7)	21.5 (70.7)	21.7 (71.1)	22.1 (71.8)	20.9 (69.6)	20.4 (68.7)	22.0 (71.6)
Mean daily minimum °C (°F)	10.9 (51.6)	12.8 (55.0)	16.1 (61.0)	17.7 (63.9)	17.4 (63.3)	16.9 (62.4)	16.7 (62.1)	16.8 (62.2)	16.4 (61.5)	15.8 (60.4)	13.6 (56.5)	10.7 (51.3)	15.2 (59.4)
Record low °C (°F)	4.0 (39.2)	7.0 (44.6)	8.3 (46.9)	12.5 (54.5)	11.0 (51.8)	11.0 (51.8)	11.5 (52.7)	12.0 (53.6)	12.0 (53.6)	9.2 (48.6)	6.7 (44.1)	6.0 (42.8)	4.0 (39.2)
Average rainfall mm (inches)	0.8 (0.03)	1.1 (0.04)	39.2 (1.54)	136.6 (5.38)	183.9 (7.24)	226.6 (8.92)	268.6 (10.57)	279.6 (11.01)	236.9 (9.33)	117.7 (4.63)	5.7 (0.22)	0.0 (0.0)	1,496.7 (58.91)
Average rainy days (≥ 1.0 mm)	0	0	4	14	19	21	24	23	23	15	1	0	144
Average relative humidity (%)	33	30	44	72	77	81	83	82	81	75	55	47	63
Mean monthly sunshine hours	286.4	258.7	235.4	195.5	195.4	165.7	128.0	127.8	139.0	184.0	264.1	291.4	2,471.4
Source 1: NOAA, Meteo Climat (record highs and lows)
Source 2: Deutscher Wetterdienst (humidity, 1954–1967)

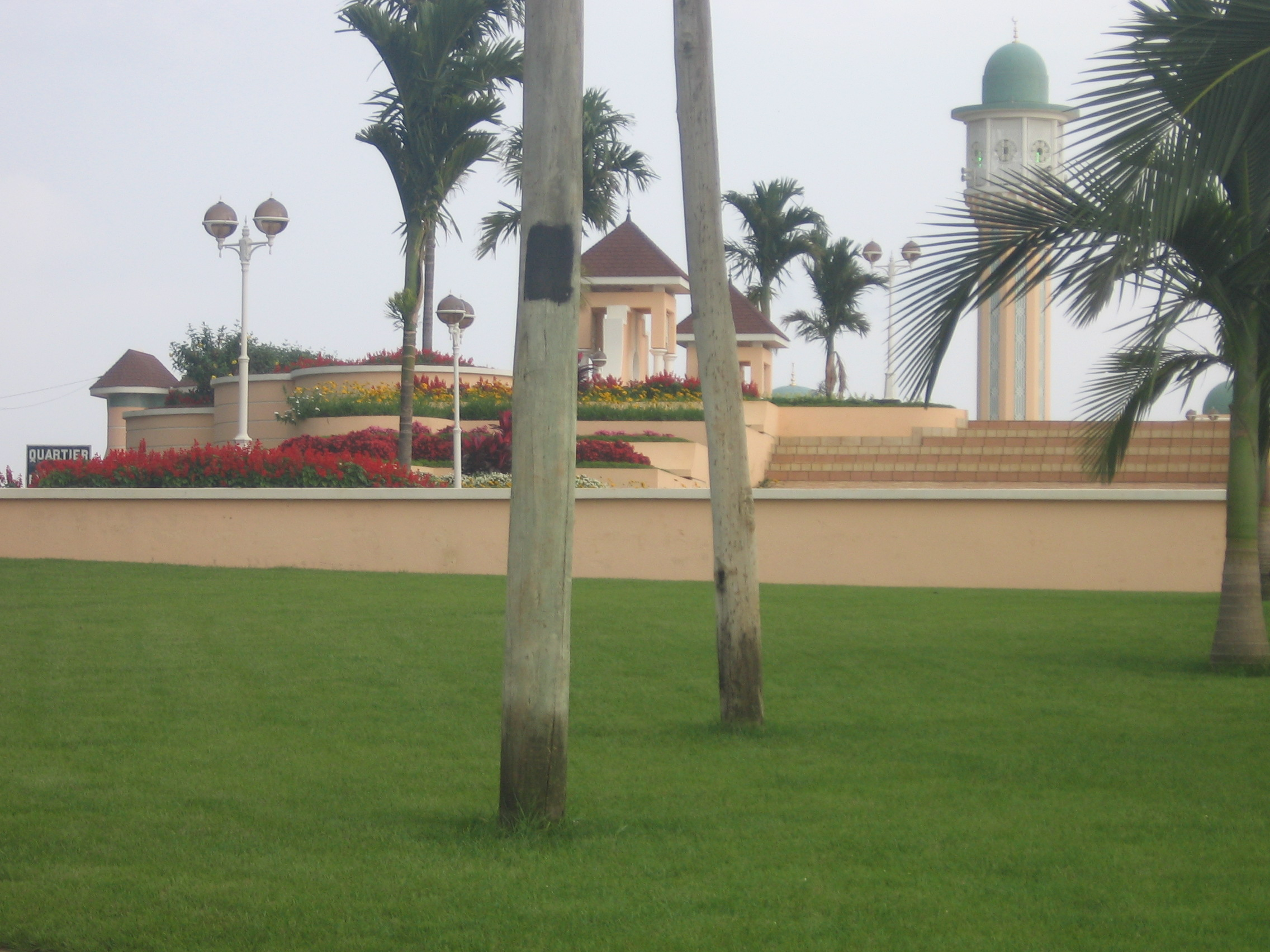
A house in the wealthy neighbourhood of Quartier Haut Plateau, Ngaoundere

== Communications ==
The city serves as an important communications hub, linking the south of Cameroon with the northern part of the country.

=== Rail ===
The Camrail railway from Yaoundé ends here, and Ngaoundéré Central Station is always sprawling with life. An extension of this railway 700 km to Chad was approved in 2015. According to a report from Business in Cameroon, the Cameroonian government and the African Development Bank group (AfDB) signed on 19 July 2017 in Yaoundé, a memorandum on the feasibility studies for the project to extend the Cameroonian railway to Chad, from the Cameroon Railways (Camrail) terminal in Ngaoundéré, the Adamawa regional capital, in northern Cameroon.

=== Road ===
There is a paved road, albeit with some potholes, extending from Ngaoundéré to Garoua and Maroua, and Chad. The main goods are bananas, fruits and general goods from the south. The north sends cotton stemming from North and Chad, and cattle from Adamaoua towards the south.

=== Air ===
Ngaoundéré Airport has a 1.6 km strip, capable of accepting Boeing 737 and similar aircraft. In the 1980s and early 1990s, the airport had several flights a week to both Yaoundé and Douala in the south, Garoua in the north, and N'Djamena, Chad. Because of economic decline and the decline of the national carrier, Cameroon Airlines, the airport currently sees very little traffic, if any. The airports ICAO code is FKKN while the IATA code is NGE.

=== Radio ===
Ngaoundéré is linked to the Cameroonian microwave network, but the system is not very reliable. The Fulani radio station Sawtu Linjiila is located in the city.

=== Internet ===
Many private companies have two-way satellite communications and there are many cybercafés in the city.

== Mining ==
There are bauxite deposits in the vicinity, especially at Minim, Martap.

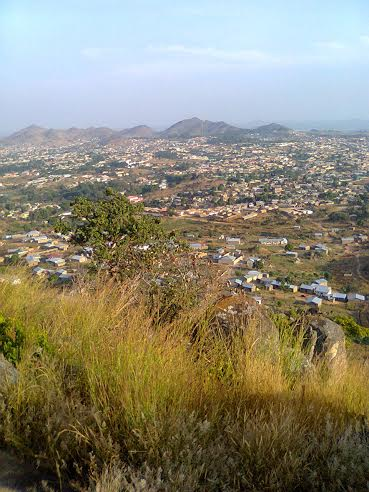
View from Mount Ngaoundere

== Religion ==
Among the places of worship, they are predominantly Muslim mosques. There are also Christian churches and temples. The Diocese of Ngaoundéré is a diocese of the Catholic Church whose current bishop is Emmanuel Abbo.

== Demographics ==
Year	Population
2018 est.	approx. 1,000,000
2005 est.	approx. 200,000

== Notable people ==
- Auriol Dongmo, athlete
- René Philombé, writer
- Richard Touko, footballer

== See also ==
- Railway stations in Cameroon
