= Adamawa Region =

Region of Cameroon

Adamawa Adamaoua
- Region
- Location of Adamawa within Cameroon
- Coordinates: 7°20′N 13°30′E
- Country: Cameroon
- Capital: Ngaoundéré
- Divisions: Djérem, Faro-et-Déo, Mayo-Banyo, Mbéré, Vina

Government
  - Governor: Kildadi Taguieke Boukar

Area
  - Total: 63,701 km^{2} (24,595 sq mi)

Population (2023)
  - Total: 3,928,248
  - Density: 61.667/km^{2} (159.72/sq mi)
- Time zone: UTC+01:00 (WAT)
- HDI (2022): 0.503 low · 8th of 10

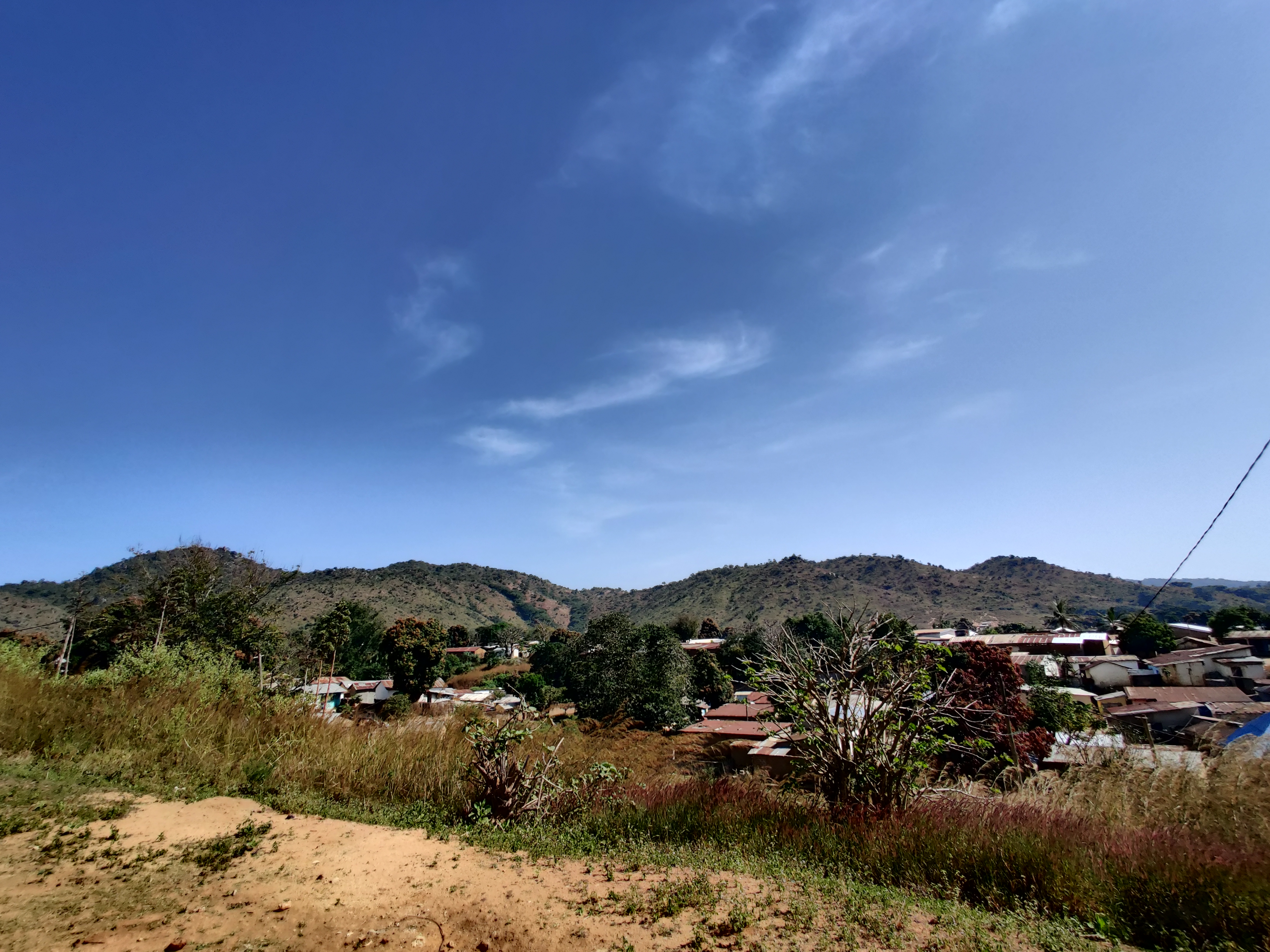
Mountainous area near Tignère locality, Faro-et-Déo department

The Adamawa Region (French: Région de l'Adamaoua) is a constituent region of the Republic of Cameroon. It borders the Centre and East regions to the south, the Northwest and West regions to the southwest, Nigeria to the west, the Central African Republic (CAR) to the east, and the North Region to the north.

This mountainous area forms the barrier between Cameroon's forested south and savanna north. At almost 64,000 km^{2} in land area, the Adamawa is the third largest of Cameroon's ten regions. The land is rugged and sparsely populated, however, as most is devoted to the rearing of cattle. The Muslim Fulbe (Fulani) form the major ethnic group, though Tikar, Gbaya, and other peoples are present in lesser numbers.

== History ==
=== Early population movements ===
The Adamawa's oldest populations were various Paleo-Sudanese peoples. These were mostly displaced or absorbed by invading Sudanese groups in the 8th or 9th century. These included the Mbum (Mboum), Ndoro (Dourou), Kutin, (Koutine), Laka-Mbere, Chamba, Doayo, Fali, Mundang (Moundang), and Tupuri (Toupouri).

Its southwestern flank lies within the northern fringes of the region of the earliest (Proto-) Bantu homeland from where the Bantu expansion began about 2000 BC (Blench, 1993). This stretch is believed to contain some of "the Bantu who stated home" after the Bantu split and expansion to central, eastern and southern Africa Zeitlyn - Connell, 2003:136). Since the split, the southwestern section witnessed series of invasions and dispersals analogous to Armageddon. Many of the populations of the Western Grassfields can be traced to these dispersals.

The Kanem-Bornu Empire of Lake Chad had relations with these tribes. They called the area Fumbina or Mabina (a name which denoted the present province as well as territories in present-day Nigeria and the Central African Republic). The Kanem-Bornu also introduced Islam to the region between 1349 and 1385 by way of the Islamic centre at Kano in present-day Nigeria. However, no more than a few rulers, nobles or merchants ever converted.

Many more tribes entered the territory from the region of Chad between the 14th and 17th centuries. These included the Semi-Bantu tribes, such as the Bamileke, Bamun, Kom, Nso, Tikar, Widikum, and Wimbam. The Bantu came as well, examples being the Beti-Pahuin and Maka and Njem. Other groups who came were the Gbaya, from the present CAR, and the Vute, from the Lake Chad region. The Vute were region's first iron workers, and they founded the towns of Mbamnyang (present Banyo) and Tibaré (present Tibati). The Semi-Bantu peoples gradually moved south before settling near the headwaters of the Mbam River sometime between the 17th and 19th centuries. The Bantu settled east of them, south of the Adamawa Plateau. One or all of these populations founded Banyo, Tibati, and Ngaoundéré.

Meanwhile, the Bantu and Semi-Bantu invasions drove the longer-established Sudanese peoples north. The Mbum, Ndoro, Kutin, and Laka-Mbere moved to the present-day province's northern reaches, while the other Sudanese migrated even farther. This period marked the highest population for the Adamawa territory until modern times. However, one event had drastic consequences for the region: the arrival of the Fulbe.

=== Fulbe jihads ===
Early Fulbe settlers entered the Adamawa from present-day Nigeria or northern Cameroon as early as the 13th century. These settlers and nomads were never numerous, however, and they often held subservient status to other tribes. Over time, however, the steady stream of Fulbe immigrants allowed Fulbe communities to spring up in many areas. These early Fulbe converted to Islam sometime in the 17th century, beginning with the settled, or town, Fulbe.

In 1804, Fulbe in the territory and beyond were growing disenchanted with submission to pagan tribes. They were also hungry for larger territories that they could use for cattle grazing. The Fulbe leader Usman dan Fodio responded to this sentiment and called a jihad. Usman named his lieutenant Modima Adam Al-Hasan, or Modibo Adama, lamido of Fumbina, and Adama quickly raised an army in the territory.

Adama's forces proved all but unstoppable. He conquered major Vute centres at Mbamnyang and Tibaré in 1835, which he renamed Banyo and Tibati. At Adama's death in 1847, Fulbe horsemen controlled territory from the Niger River to the west and the Logone to the east and from the Sahara to the north and the Sanaga River to the south to form the Sokoto Caliphate. Adama's emirate (known as the Adamawa Emirate) was divided into districts under governors; the Adamawa Plateau fell into the Ngaoundéré subdivision.

Fighting against native peoples continued for many years. Around 1830, the Fulbe conquered the Mbum village of Delbé, which they renamed Ngaoundéré, after a nearby hill. Many Mbum converted to Islam and remained, though many others migrated north. The town became the seat of the lamidat of Ardo Ndjobdi.

Beginning around 1835, Fulbe immigrants streamed into the newly conquered territories in large numbers. By 1850, the Fulbe were firmly entrenched in northern Cameroon. Native populations were subjugated and placed under the rule of the local lamidos. Native populations were forced to convert to Islam, face enslavement, or flee. Fulbe merchants accepted salt and horses from North Africa in exchange for slaves for sale in the Muslim empires to the north. A smaller number of slaves went south for the trans-Atlantic market.

Those groups who resisted had no choice but to flee to the unforgiving mountains or else to the jungle south. Those groups who were immediate neighbours to the warring Fulbe, such as the Vute and Gbaya, dislodged others who lay in their path, such as Cameroon's Bantu peoples. The Fulbe jihads thus served as the single most important event in the peopling of southern Cameroon. The jihad only served to depopulate Cameroon's north, however. The Fulbe invaders did not set up new settlements. Rather, they used their conquered lands as pasture for their cattle. Many of these groups were still migrating when they came into contact with Cameroon's new colonisers: The Germans.

=== European contacts ===
British explorers were the first Europeans to enter Adamawa territory when they came in 1822. The German Dr. Gustav Nachtigal was the first Westerner to explore the region extensively, which he did between 1869 and 1873. Nachtigal kept a keen eye out to notice what groups lived in the region, what their relations were like with their neighbours, and what resources could possibly be exploited from the area. The British Eduard E. Flegel followed Nachtigal in 1882. He explored the Adamawa emirate, setting up trade and reaching as far south as Banyo. He died in 1883, however, still on expedition, and peaceful contact between the West and the Fulbe empire came to an end. Instead, Germany annexed part of Adama's empire in 1884, and the other part became part of British Nigeria. As far as Europe was concerned, the Adama emirate no longer existed.

=== German administration ===
The Fulbe fiercely opposed German hegemony. The German governor Jesko von Puttkamer sent soldiers under Captain Von Kamptz to suppress the uprisings, and on 7 May 1899, Banyo became the first major town to surrender. Tibati fell a month later, and Ngaoundéré followed on 20 September 1901. The Adamawa Plateau was now largely pacified, and the Germans pushed north toward the important trade town of Garoua.

Germany eventually prevailed against the Fulbe, and the present Adamawa fell into the Ngaoundéré administrative area, or "residency". From 1902 to 1903, Germany allowed most lamidos to stay in power, albeit under German supervision; rulers who refused to cooperate were replaced. The colonials also encouraged the Islamisation of the area's non-Muslim inhabitants, as this would place them under the rule of the lamidos, who were already submissive to the German governor.

=== French administration ===
Germany's 1916 defeat in Africa in World War I eventually gave control of the territory to the French, the region's third occupying force in less than a century. The new governors placed the region in the Mora-Garoua administrative area with its capital at Garoua.

French colonial policies varied little from their German predecessors. Lamidos were left in nominal power, though they were expected to carry out French policies. France also did away with recalcitrant rulers, and by 1936, the region had 39 lamidos and one sultan. France's main contribution to the region was its improvements to infrastructure. Road construction, in particular, accelerated during French rule, and the colonials had a road built from Foumban to Garoua via Banyo, Tibati, and Ngaoundéré.

In 1956, France made all of its West African colonies self-governing. André-Marie Mbida became the first premier of Cameroon. Mbida quickly alienated the Muslim north, however, when he introduced his Abong-Mbang Resolutions. One of these called for the "democratisation" of northern Cameroon, which the Muslim rulers feared was code for bringing an end to their influence. Muslim leaders thus threatened to secede from Cameroon and join French Chad unless the resolutions were recalled. The events eventually led to Mbida's expulsion from the prime ministry and his replacement by Ahmadou Ahidjo, a Muslim from the country's north.

=== Post-independence ===
Ahidjo became Cameroon's first president after the country's independence on 1 January 1960. He devoted substantial resources to developing his northern homeland, such as the extension of a road north from Yaoundé to better link Cameroon's north and south. The railroad followed soon thereafter, construction beginning in 1961 and reaching Ngaoundéré ten years later.

The northern Muslims largely viewed the arrival of Cameroon's second president, Paul Biya, suspiciously. This was largely due to an Ahidjo partisan named Moussa Yaya, whom Biya and the press accused of trying to turn the lamidos against the new leader. Biya enjoys some support in the province today, but his popularity is nowhere near as strong as in Cameroon's south. Part of this is because Biya's main activities in the north have been minimal. He split the North Province into three parts in 1983, thus creating the Far North Region (Cameroon), North, and Adamawa Provinces as they exist today. He also absorbed the University of Ngaoundéré into the national system.

In the first months of 2014, thousands of refugees fleeing the violence in the Central African Republic arrived in Cameroon via the border towns of the Adamawa Region, East Region, and North Region.

=== 2008 presidential decree abolishes provinces ===
In 2008, the President of the Republic of Cameroon, President Paul Biya signed decrees abolishing "Provinces" and replacing them with "Regions". Hence, all of the country's ten provinces are now known as Regions.

== Geography ==
=== Land ===
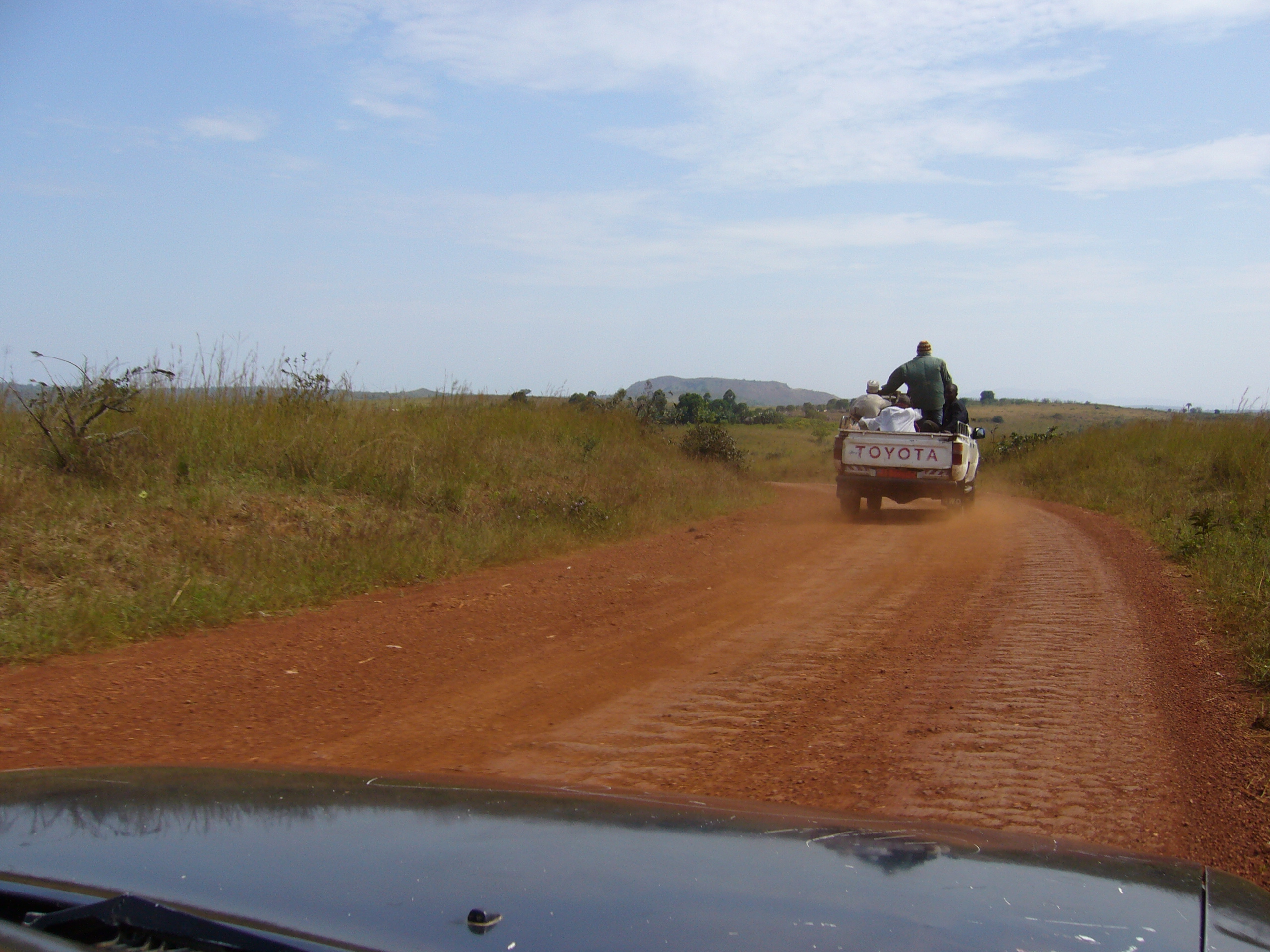
On the road between Ngaoundéré and Bélel

The Adamawa is one of Cameroon's more geologically diverse areas. The Gotel and Mambila Mountains at the border with Nigeria are largely composed of granite, which gives way to crystalline and metamorphic rock such as mica, schists, and gneiss. These are often covered in volcanic basalt, a combination that dominates until the Faro River. East of this, granites once again prevail, though sedimentary rock forms the valley of the Mbéré River, and a zone of metamorphic rock surrounds this. The Lom River also rises in a region of metamorphic rock. Volcanic rock occurs in the northwest just east of the Gotel Mountains and northeast of Ngaoundéré, the provincial capital, along the border with the North Province.

Soils are mostly made up of brown or brownish-red laterites, the result of the annual shift between dry and wet conditions and soil wash on the mountains. Iron and aluminium content is high, which causes hardpans, duracrust, or cuirasses to form near the surface due to oxidation. The soil of the Lom valley is a lightly evolved composition of raw materials, as is that directly northwest of the Mbakaou Reservoir and directly west of the Faro River. The extreme northwest of the province has ferruginous soil instead, and many of the province's mountains, including the Gotes and Mambilas, contain mixtures of several soil types.

== Drainage ==
The Adamawa is sometimes dubbed the "water tower" of Cameroon, since a large number of the country's rivers rise in the area. All of these fall into a tropical climate, with a period of high water from May to September during the rainy season, and a period of low water – or even complete dryness – from October to April. Some of these are subject to seasonal flooding as well, such as the Djérem in the area of the Mbakaou Reservoir. The province's rivers fall into three different basins: those that ultimately flow into the Niger River, to Lake Chad, and to the Atlantic Ocean.

The Mayo Deo River rises in the Gotel Mountains and then flows into the North Province. The Faro River begins a short distance east of the Mayo Deo but follows a wide, arcing course east and north between the Vina division and the Faro and Deo division before entering the North Province (the two rivers eventually join).

Two major rivers lie in the Chad Basin. The Mbéré rises north of the town of Meiganga and then flows northeast toward the border with the North Province and the Central Africa Republic. The headwaters of the Vina River flow just north of Ngaoundéré before the river enters the North Province. These two rivers eventually merge to form the Logone River.

The Mbam, Kim, and Djérem are the major rivers of the Atlantic basin. The Mbam and Kim both rise in the southwest before flowing into the Centre Province. The Djérem forms in eastern and western branches, which converge at the Mbakaou Reservoir. The river then flows south into the East Province. Due to the reservoir (which holds two million cubic metres of water), the Djérem forms an important source of hydroelectric power for Cameroon. Finally, the Lom rises about 60 km east of Meiganga before flowing south into the East Province. The Djérem eventually becomes the Sanaga River, and these other rivers ultimately empty into it.

A long history of volcanism has also created a number of crater lakes in the province, the results of collapsed volcanoes filling with water. Among the most well known are Lakes Tison (Tyson, Tisson) and Mbalang near Ngaoundéré.

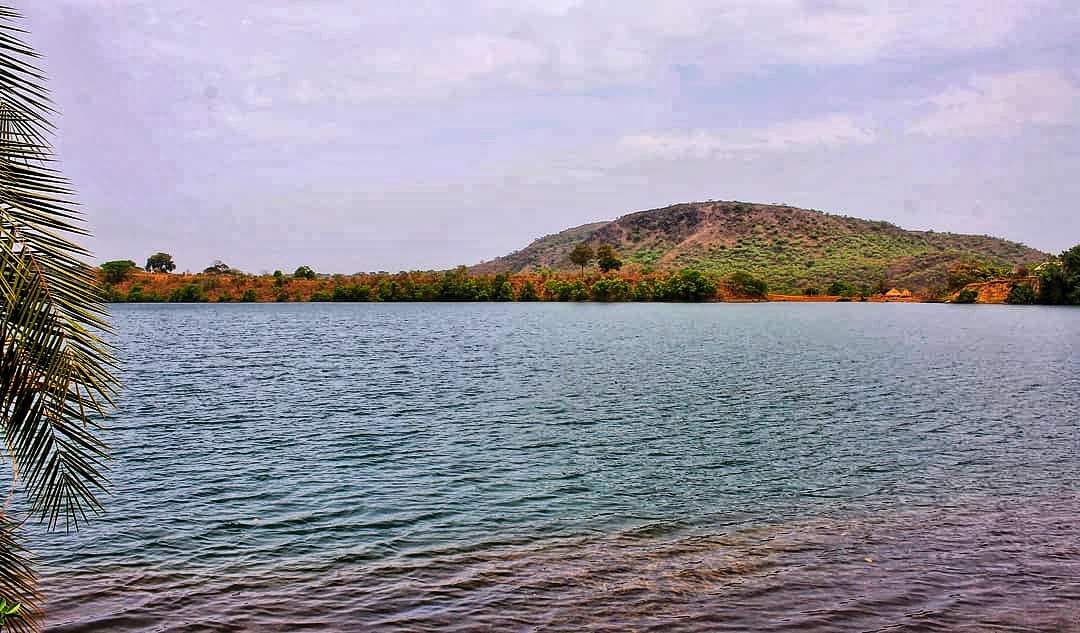
Lake Mbalang near to Ngaoundere

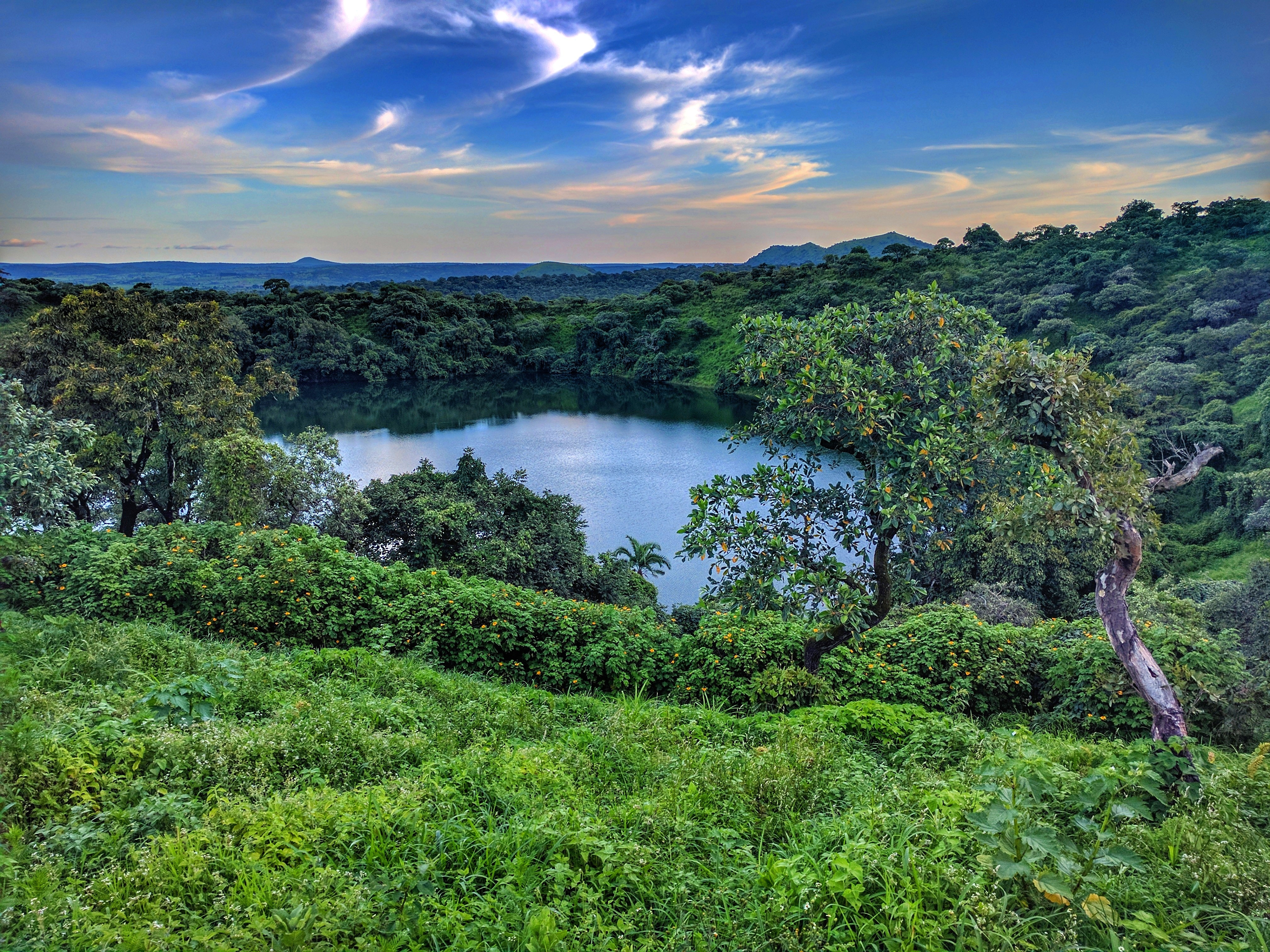
Lake Tizon at Ngaoundere

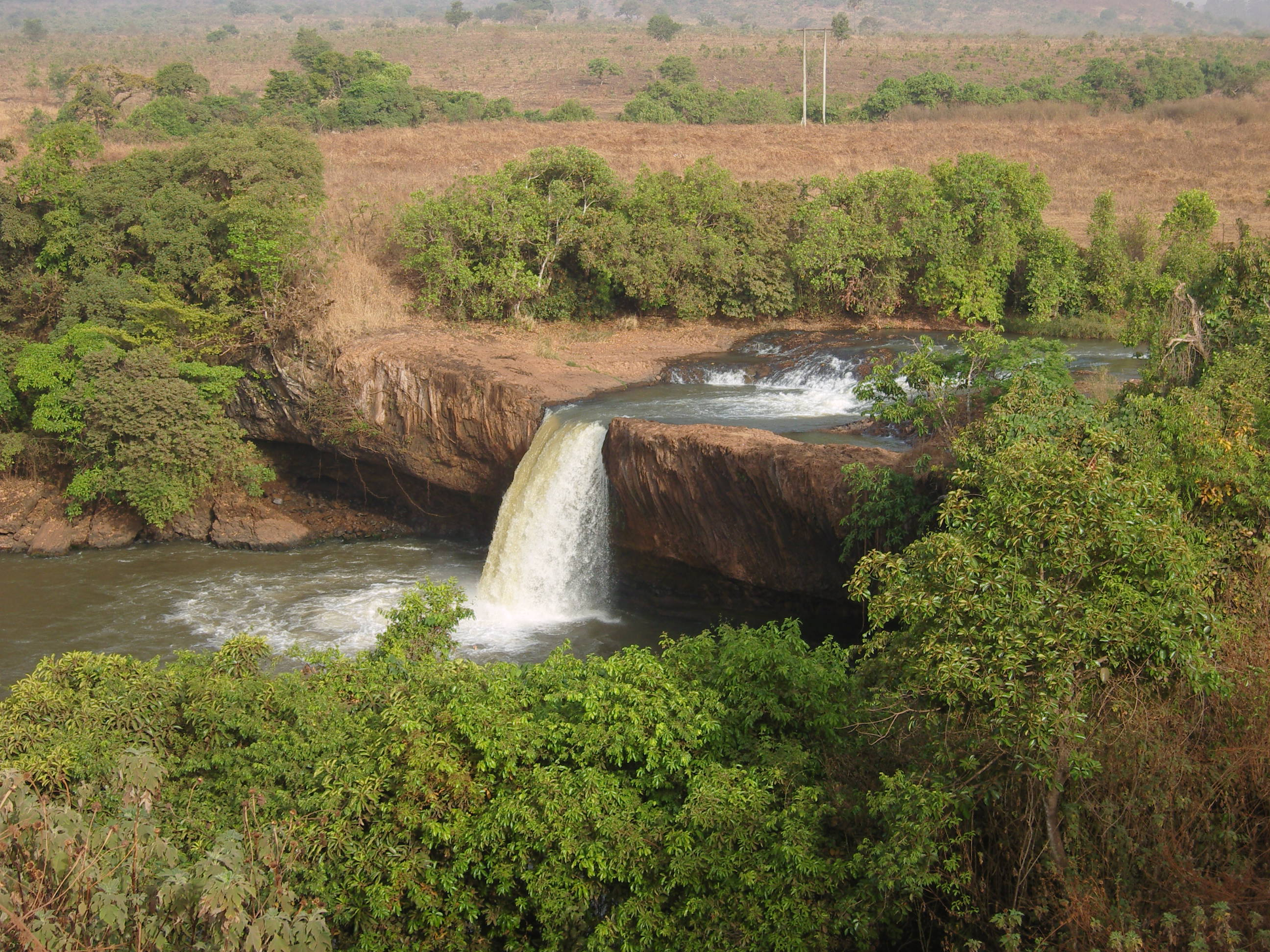
Vina River located in Ngaoundéré

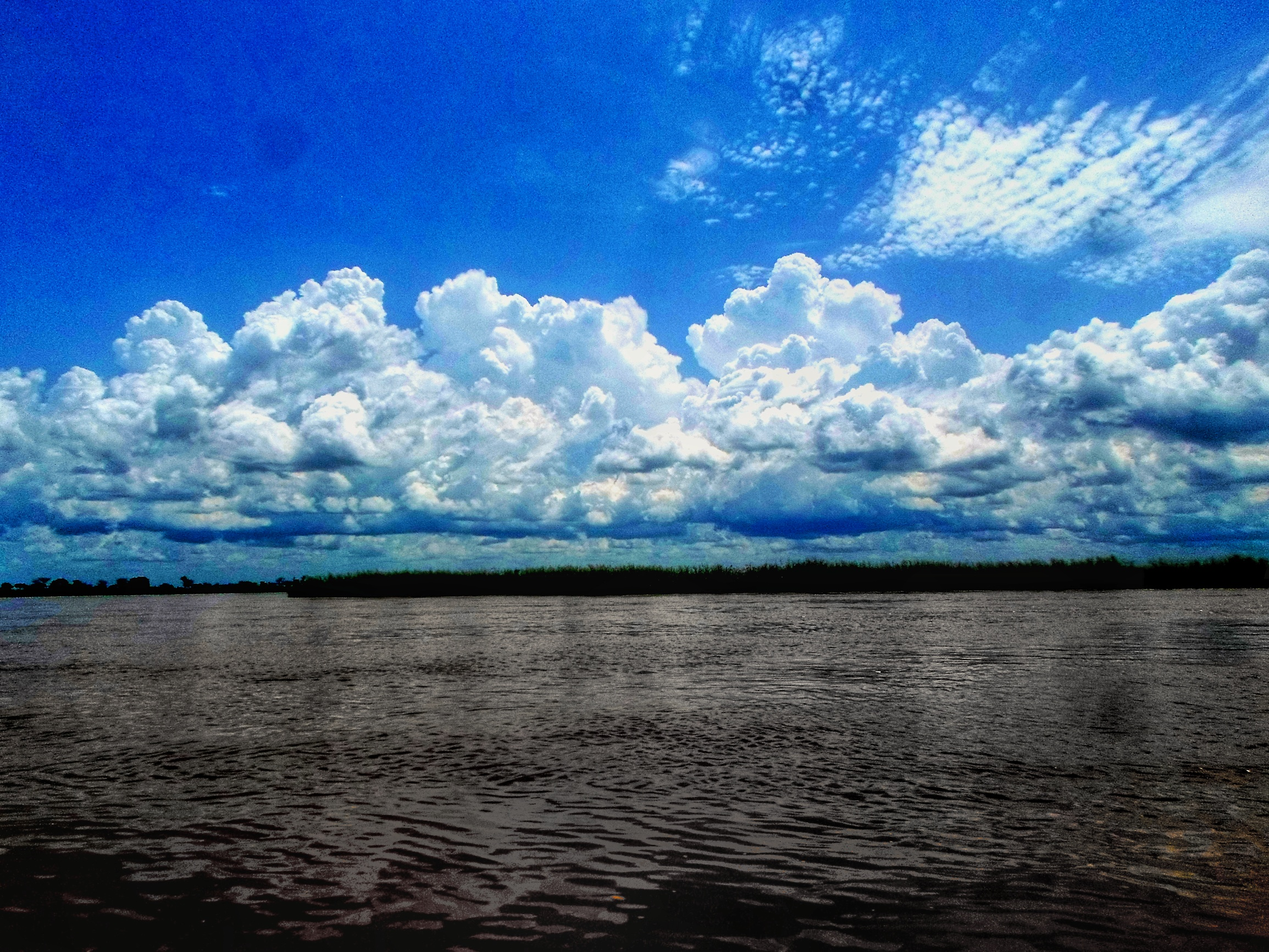
Logone River located between Cameroon and Chad

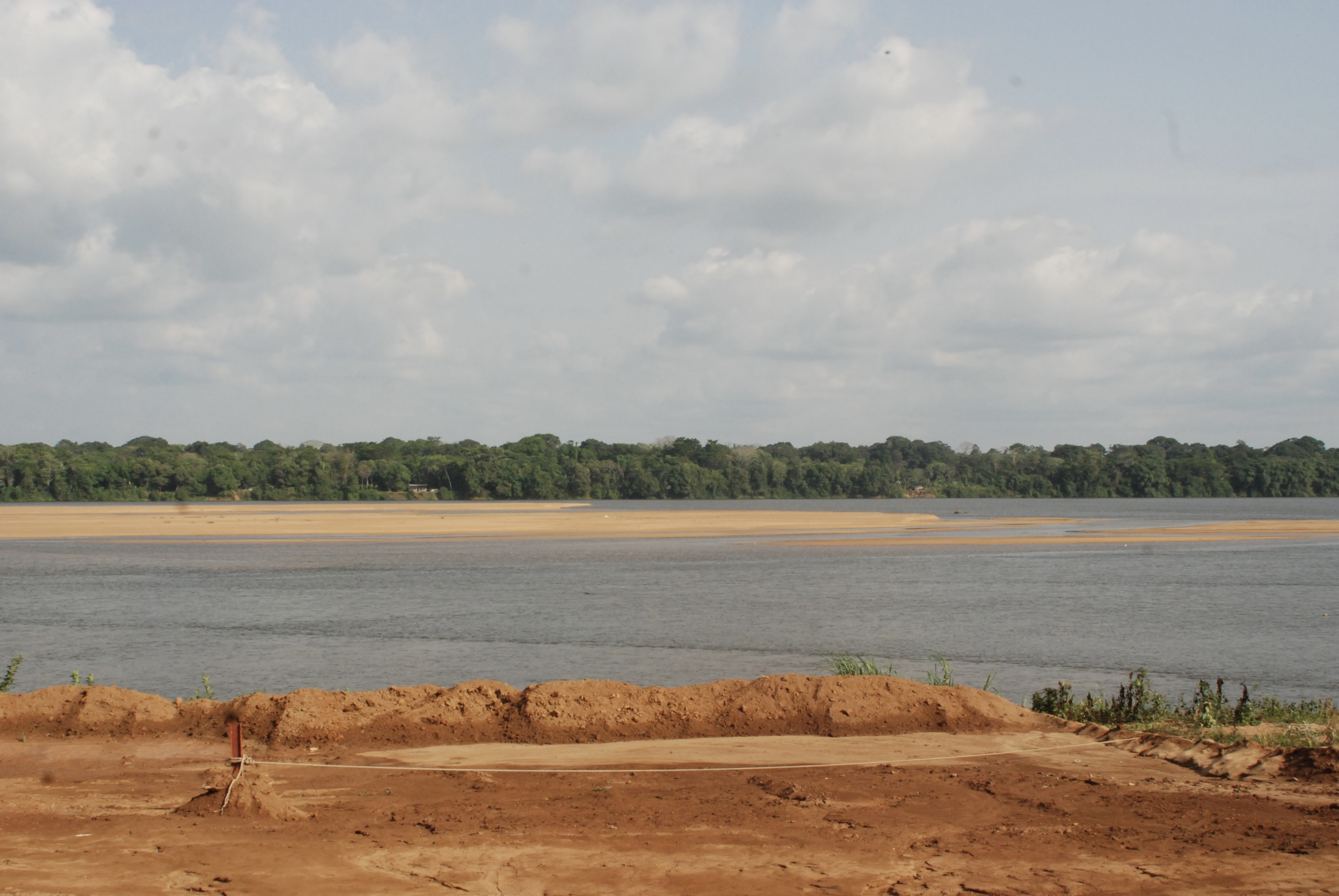
Sanaga River

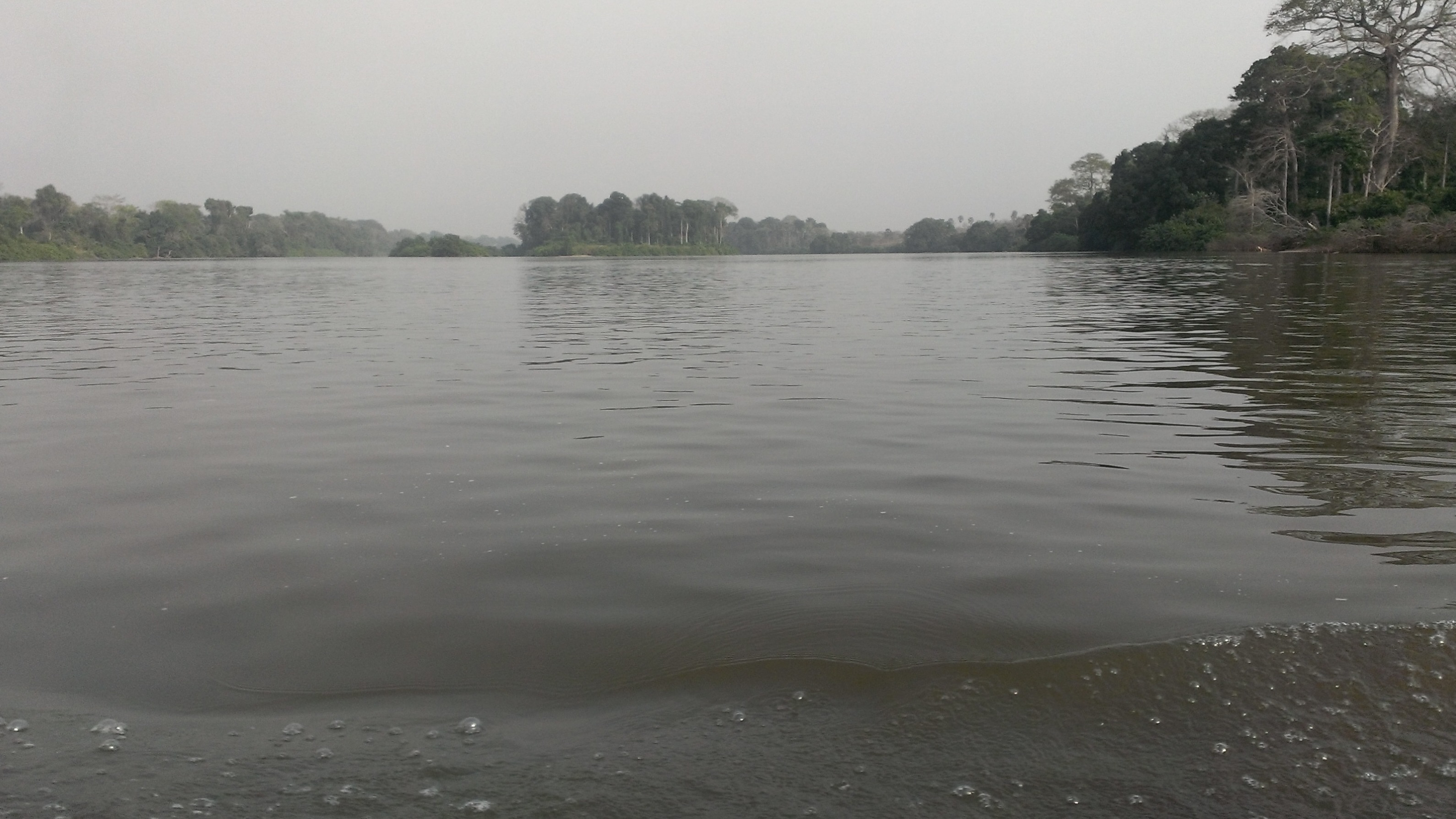
Mbam River

=== Relief ===
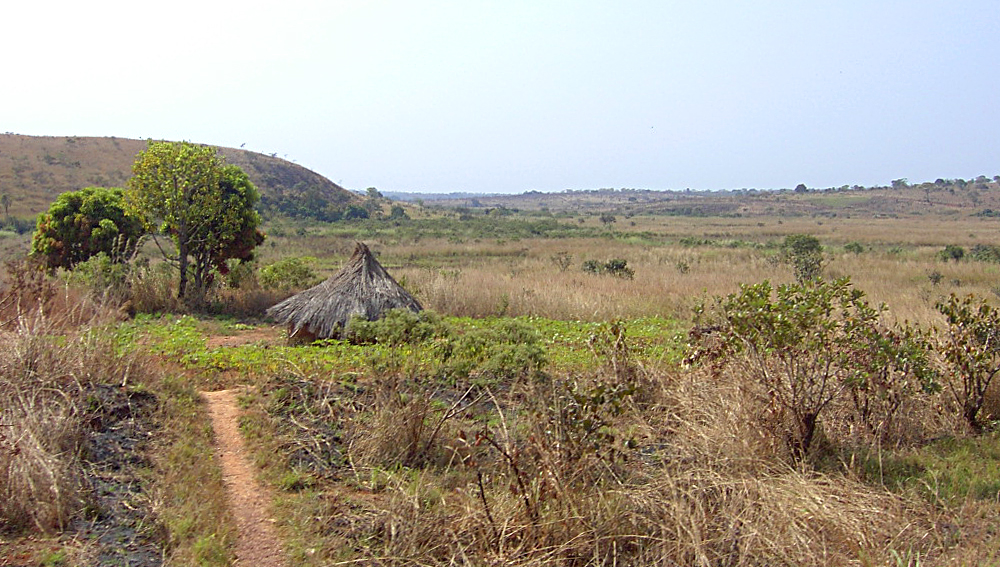
Hills and savanna near Ngaoundal

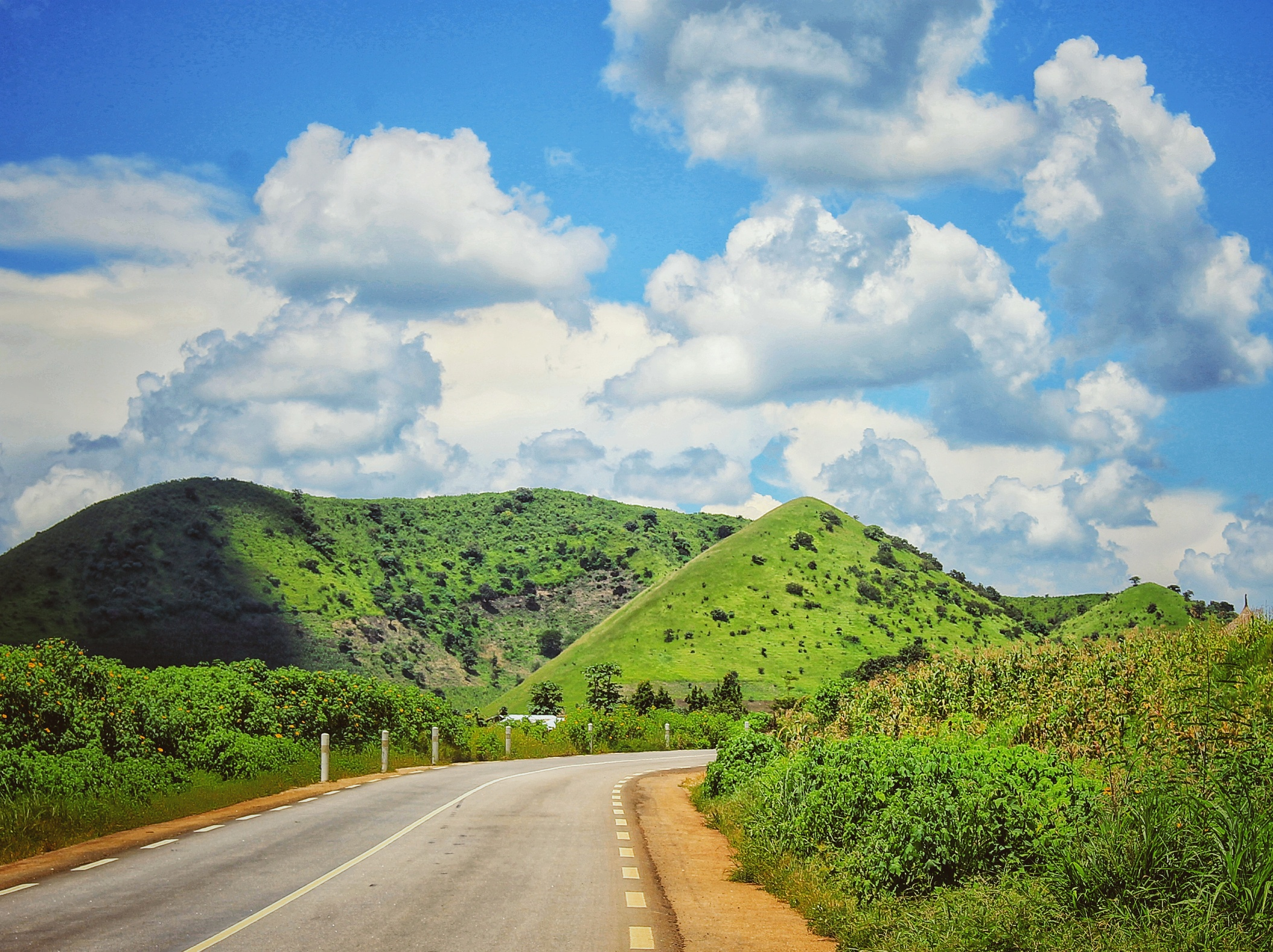
Hill road in Adamawa

Powerful geothermal forces have shaped the Adamawa. The province begins to the south as part of the South Cameroon Plateau. The land rises gently but unevenly until about 6 degrees latitude. Here begins the Adamawa Plateau, a band of terrain that ranges from 1,000 to 2,000 m in altitude (averaging about 1,100 m) and stretches from Nigeria to the CAR. Altitude dips to as low of 500 m in the Djérem and Mbéré valleys and at the border north of Ngaoundéré. The plateau continues to about 8 degrees north before descending to the Benué Depression in abrupt cliffs and active volcanoes (though this transitional zone is mostly in the North Province).

Faults also cut across the area, the major one being the Cameroon Fault, dating from the Cretaceous Period. The Mbang Mountains follow this fault in a rough cut toward the east. Other mountains dot the province, as well. The Mambilas stretch into the extreme southwest from Nigeria and the Northwest and West Provinces. The Gotels are north of these along the border with Nigeria. All of these mountains form part of the Cameroon Ridge. Tchabal Mbabo, in the Gotels, is the highest peak at 2,460 m.

=== Plant and animal life ===
The Adamawa's vegetation has been shaped greatly by man. It was once highly forested, but repeated brush burning and cattle trampling have changed the terrain. In the south, this is Guinean savanna, a transitional zone between Cameroon's forested south and desert north. On the plateau itself, the savanna continues, though it is less wooded. Grass cover is consistent and thick, and the original vegetation still survives in the river valleys.

What few trees dot the landscape are evergreen and deciduous until about 1800 m altitude, when ferns and bamboos become prevalent. Grasses are the dominant form of plant life throughout except in the few forested areas and in some regions of scrubby bush. In addition, the southwestern half of the Mayo-Banyo division is a more heavily forested woodland savanna.

The Adamawa has two national reserves. The first of these is the Parc National du Mbam et Djérem, which protects 4165 km^{2} in both the Adamawa and East Provinces. The park is notable for containing both large tracts of savanna and forest. In addition, a small portion of the Parc National de Boumba Ndjida extends into the territory from the North Province.

== Demographics ==
Historical population
Year	Pop.	±% p.a.
1976	359,334	—
1987	495,185	+2.96%
2005	884,289	+3.27%
2015	1,200,095	+3.10%

=== Settlement patterns ===
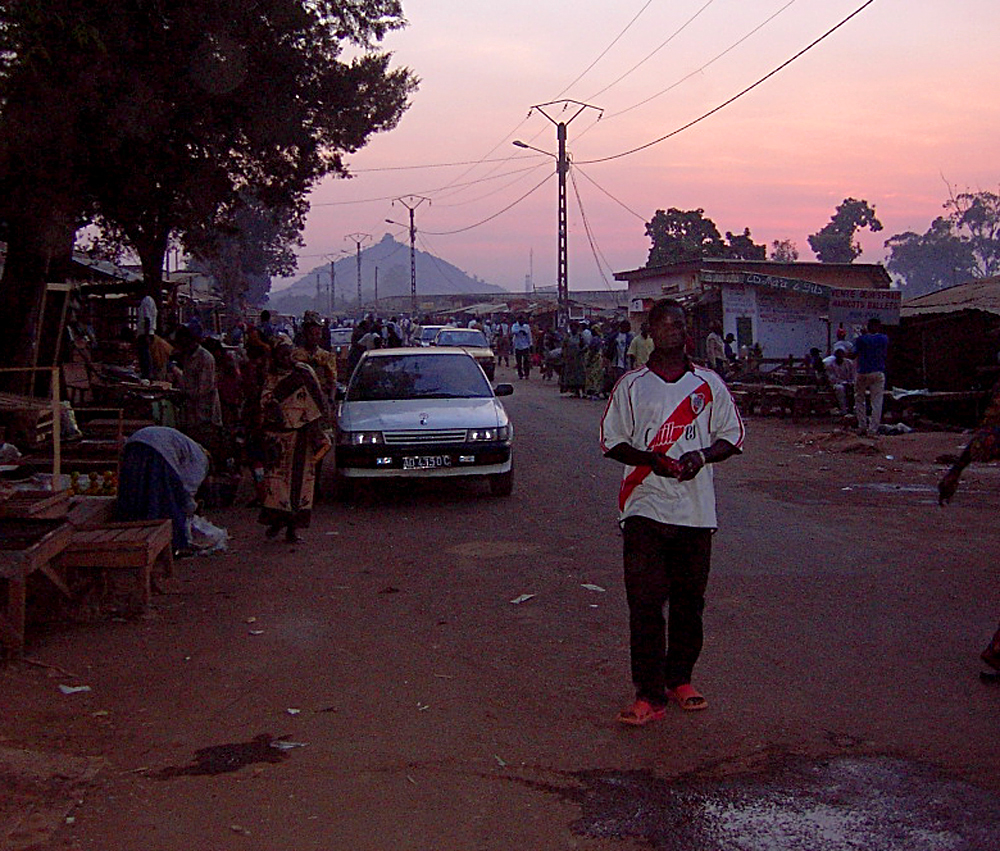
Downtown Ngaoundéré

The Adamawa is sparsely populated. Large swathes of land are devoted almost entirely to the use of Fulbe cattle herders, this pasture punctuated only by occasional settlements. The Cameroonian government has made efforts to persuade Fulbe herdsmen to adopt sedentary ways, but the nomadic traditions show little signs of change. Because the savanna has been pushing south, however, there is now a substantial amount of immigration to the Centre and East Provinces.

Ngaoundéré is one of Cameroon's fastest growing cities due to its location at the terminus of Cameroon's north–south railroad. The modern city is thus a sprawling mass of winding streets surrounding the traditional town. It is also a microcosm of the province's ethnic diversity, as representatives of most of the Adamawa's peoples can be found there.

The Mayo-Banyo division in the southwest has a slightly higher population density than the rest of the province, largely due to the highly concentrated Mambila and Konja of the Mambila Mountains and the Vute and Pere of the Gotel Mountains. The Pere are also known as the Kutin or Koutine, though this is in fact a highly derogatory term meaning "dogs" that was given to them by the Fulbe. The northern border also has a slightly higher population density than the Fulbe interior.

=== People ===
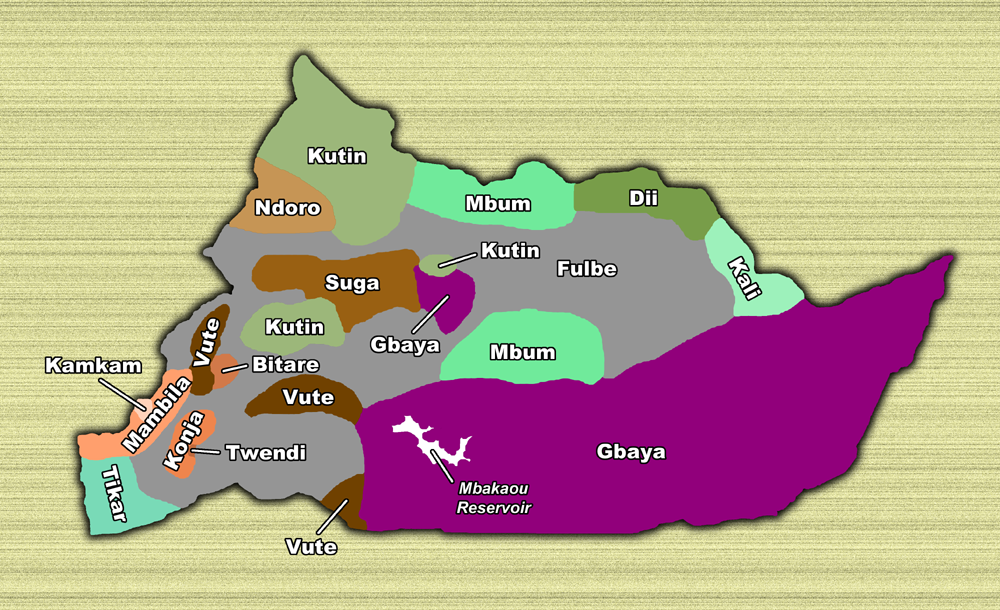
Territories of ethnic groups of the Adamawa Province

Language provides the most convenient means of categorising the Adamawa's ethnic groups. The greatest number of peoples speak various Southern Bantoid languages. These Bantoid peoples primarily occupy the province's western third, in the Faro and Deo and the Mayo-Banyo divisions. The Ndoro are the northernmost, living on the Nigerian border on the upper Mayo Deo. To their south lie the Nyem-Nyem, called Suga by the Mbum, in the northern third of Mayo-Banyo division and along the west bank of the Meng River. The Vute live south of them on the Nigerian border and in a second population centre on the southwestern bank of the Mbarkaou Reservoir. The Mambila inhabit the southwestern border, and the Konja lie inland from them along the Banyo-Bankim road. The Tikar are at the province's southwestern corner, with territories extending into the neighbouring provinces.

Those peoples who speak Adamawa languages constitute the next major grouping. The Pere are farthest west of these, living in three main concentrations. The first is at the province's northwest, north of Mayo-Baleo town. They have another centre at the village of Paro south of Tignère, and their third grouping on the Meng River. The Kali at the province's northeast, along the North Province border centred at Bélél. The Mbum (Mboum) are the last group, occupying the town of Ngaoundal and its environs. East of Ngaoundéré are the Dii, who have larger territories in the North Province.

As speakers of an Ubangi language, the Gbaya make up another important grouping. Their territory spans the whole of the Mbéré division as well as a small area at the southwest of the Vina division. They continue south into the East Province.

The Fulbe make up an estimated 60% of the Adamawa's population. They are further subdivided into two subgroups: the sedentary, or town, Fulbe and the pastoral Fulbe, or Bororo. The sedentary Fulbe are more numerous and inhabit most of the province's major towns, including Banyo, Tibati, Tignère, and Ngaoundéré, the capital. Over years of intermixing with native populations, they have come to physically resemble their Sudanese neighbours. The pastoral Fulbe create only temporary settlements, preferring instead to range across the province and beyond with large herds of cattle. These Fulbe are lighter skinned than their town brethren, tall and thin, with aquiline features.

The Fulbe speak a Cameroonian dialect of the Senegambian language Fulfulde. Due to their historical hegemony of the territory, it also serves as a lingua franca. Other major languages include Bitare, Dii, Gbaya, Mambila, and Tikar. Most educated inhabitants also speak French.

=== Religion ===
Islam is followed by many in Adamawa, especially among the Fulbe majority. Even among them, however, there is a noted difference between the sedentary Fulbe, who are more religious, and the nomadic Bororo, who are often only nominally Muslim. Christianity has made many inroads, though Christians are in a distinct minority. Many of the tribes retain animist, or "pagan", beliefs, particularly in the mountains near the Nigerian border.

=== Climate ===
The province's high elevation lends it a relatively cool climate average between 22 and 25 degrees Celsius. However, specific conditions vary between the South Cameroon and Adamawa Plateaus. The former experiences an equatorial climate of the Guinea type with four seasons: a long, dry period from December to May, a short, wet period from May to June, a short, dry season from July to October, and finally a long, wet season from October to November.

The climate of the Adamawa Plateau is classified as tropical of the Sudan type. It has only two seasons; November begins the dry period, and April the wet. Rainfall here averages 900 to 1,500 mm per year and decreases further north. May and June are the wettest, with occasional tornadoes; August is another rainfall peak. In addition, temperatures dip from November to January, as conditions similar to those that cause winter in temperate climes take at least a tentative hold. Temperatures rise due to the Harmattan beginning in January, reaching a high in April. Torrential rains in May and June bring temperatures down once again.

A third climate type characterises the Adamawa's southwest corner (most of the Mayo-Banyo division). This region experiences an equatorial climate of the Cameroon type. Rainfall is within 1,500 to 2,000 mm with a long dry period followed by a long wet period.

== Economy ==
=== Livestock ===
The Adamawa's economy is based almost entirely on one single thing: cattle, a Fulbe monopoly. The region's low population, high humidity, and vast fields of grass make it ideal for grazing. Herdsmen rotate pastures, and they often construct watering holes or wells for themselves and their animals.

The close relationship between the Bororo and their herds lends a great cultural importance to a Fulbe's number of cattle, and the more heads of cattle a man has, the wealthier he is. This often leads herders to never kill their animals, however, and to keep sick animals alive for fear of losing a portion of one's net worth. Nevertheless, many Fulbe herders transport their cattle to the big markets of Yaoundé and Douala for sale (some make it as far as Gabon and Congo). The major transhumance paths are in the western third of the province and at the border with Chad.

Most of these animals are of the humpbacked zebu breed. Near Ngaoundéré and Banyo, these are called Fulani zebu, large and meaty animals with dark-brown hides and white spots. The nomadic Fulbe, on the other hand, herd Bororo zebu. These are leaner, lighter-coloured beasts that are better able to travel long distances.

The government-run Institut de Récherche Zootechniques (IZR) and SODEPA have established a handful of modern cattle ranches, as well. The major ones are near the villages of Laro, Wakwo and Ndokayo. Here, ranchers have bred new breeds of cattle by mixing native Fulbe animals with the American Brahmin. Government initiatives have also been instrumental in the eradication of the tsetse fly in the region.

Many ranchers and Bororo also raise horses and donkeys. In addition, the Adamawa has more goats and sheep than any other province, as these can live even in the larger towns. Pigs, however, are much less common due to the prevalence of Islam in the region.

=== Agriculture ===
Nearly all farming in the province is done at the sustenance level. Millet is the mainstay, though maize, and manioc are also important. Other crops, grown in smaller quantities, include cocoyams, yams, and groundnuts.

The Gbaya, Mbum, and Dourou are the region's most prolific farmers, though even the herdsmen farm in the rainy season. Farms are typically small plots that are cleared or burned out of the brush and then planted during the dry season. Crops grow during the rainy season, when they are harvested. Because the dry season is so long, crops must be preserved, so most are transformed into grain, which is pounded by hand with mortar and pestle.

Cash crops play a small role in the region's economy. SODEBLE grows wheat on 100 km^{2} at Wassandé, near Ngaoundéré. The southwestern Mayo-Banyo division also has some coffee plots. Other interests have established groundnut, millet, and wheat plantations in recent years.

=== Industry ===
The Adamawa has a bit of industry, most located in the capital. Much of this is tied to the region's cattle-based economy. For example, leatherworking is an important industry in Ngaoundéré, as evidenced by the Société des Tanneries et Peausseries du Cameroun (STPC) factory. Rubber, perfume, and dairy products are also processed in the capital. Handicrafts, including woodworking and mat weaving, form another sector. Tin is mined near Mayo Darlé and the Nigerian border and southwest of Banyo, and bauxite is mined near Ngaoundal and Minim-Martap. Mineral water is obtained at Doungué.

The Mbakaou Power Station is an operational mini hydroelectric power station located approx. 34 kilometres (21 mi) southeast of Tibati, the nearest large town.

=== Transport ===
Ngaoundéré is the gateway to the province, and it is most easily accessible from southern Cameroon via the "Transcam II" rail line. The trip takes between 12 and 30 hours, but the presence of couchettes makes the journey bearable for those who can afford them. Other passengers are crammed into all available seats, however, including those in the dining car. Due to the overcrowded conditions, thieves are another hazard.

Road travel from the south is also possible, but this is limited to poor roads from the Centre Province or else a long detour through the East Province, where the roads are not much better. Roads within the Adamawa itself are mostly unpaved and are often in poor condition (particularly south of Ngaoundéré) due to little maintenance. The road north from Ngaoundéré into the North Province is paved, however, meaning that those traveling via train can continue to the North and Far North without too much discomfort. National Road 6 enters the province from Foumban in the West Province and continues on to Banyo, Tibati, and Meïganga. National Road 15 comes from Sangbé in the Centre Province to Tibati and on to Ngaoundéré.

A regional airport services Ngaoundéré with flights to Yaoundé, Douala, Garoua, and Maroua. Tignère, Banyo, Ngaoundal, Tibati, and the Mbakaou Reservoir all have airstrips.

=== Tourism ===
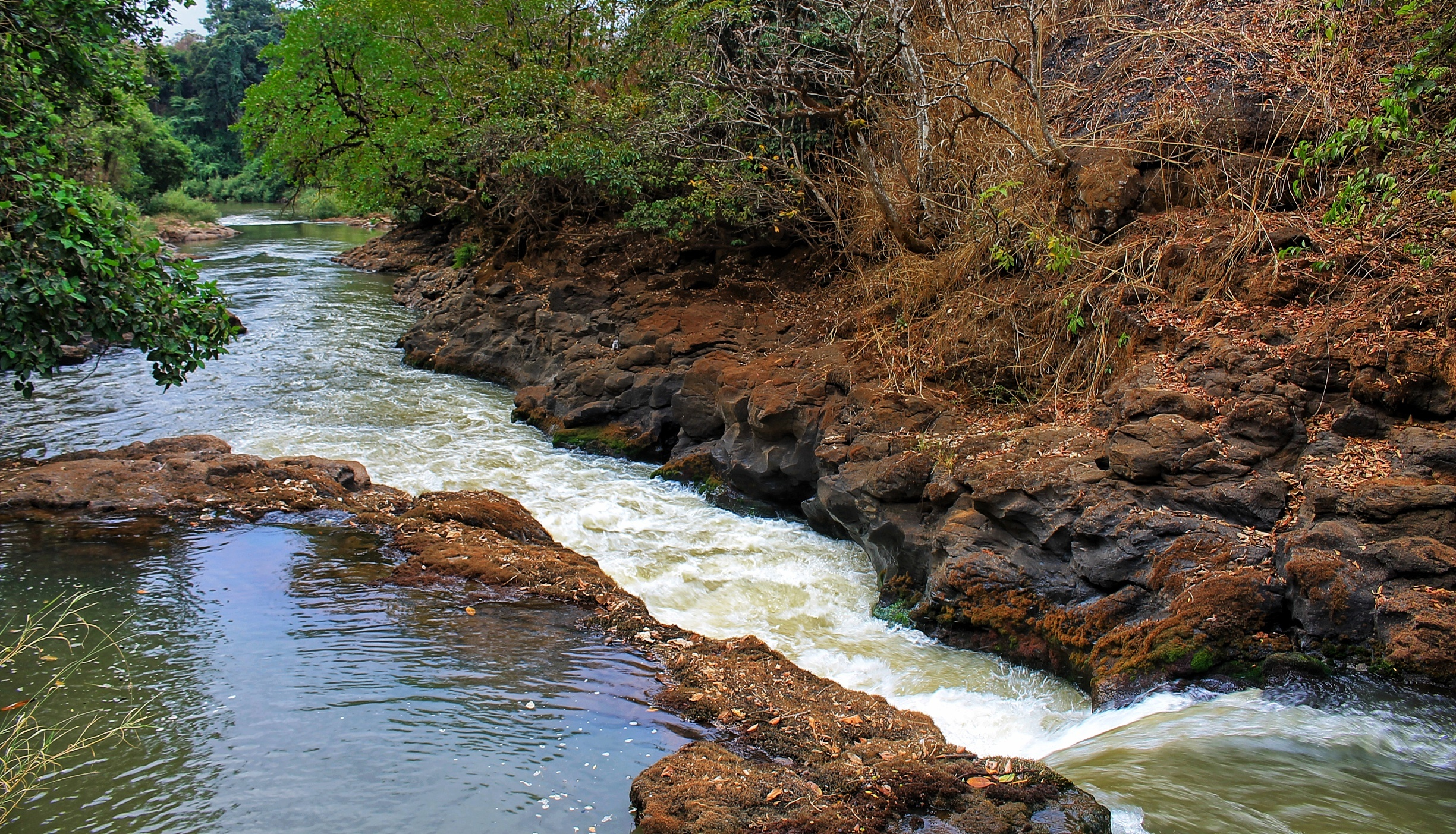
Running water from the Vina waterfall located in Ngaoundere

Most travellers see the Adamawa only briefly as they transition at Ngaoundéré from the train to a bus further north. The province does see some visitors who are interested in the region's rich cultural history. A number of lamidos allow tourists to visit their palaces, for example, such as the ruler of Ngo, who receives nobles every Friday and Sunday. The province also has numerous scenic destinations ranging from crater lakes to caves and waterfalls.

== Administration and social conditions ==
What social inequalities exist in the Adamawa largely stem from the region's high level of cultural homogeneity. Most people in the province are Muslim Fulbe, and those who are not often fall prey to racism and discrimination, especially in more rural areas. The Cameroonian government has made efforts to encourage the region's nomads to settle, but so far has made little progress.

With its low population, the Adamawa holds little import to Cameroonian politicians. However, the Fulbe tribe is spread throughout the country, especially in the three northern provinces, and together they form a significant bloc that Cameroonian politicians cannot easily ignore. This is one way that Cameroon's greater north is able to oppose policies more favourable to the south.

=== Government ===
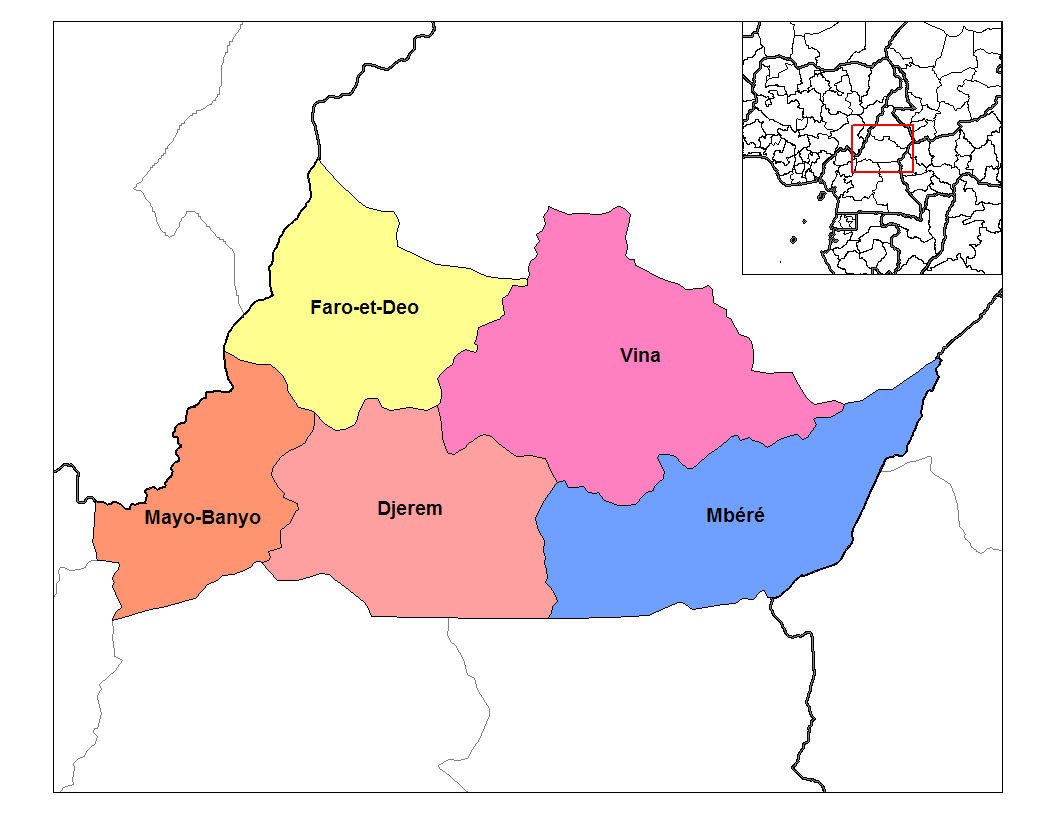
Departments of Adamawa

Adamawa is composed of five departments (departements):

1. Djérem, with its capital at Tibati
2. Faro-et-Déo, with its headquarters in Tignère
3. Mayo-Banyo, with its capital in Banyo
4. Mbéré, headed from Meiganga
5. Vina, governed from Ngaoundéré

A presidentially appointed prefect (prefet), or senior divisional officer, governs each of these. The president also appoints the governor, whose offices are in Ngaoundéré.

==== Traditional political organisation ====
Lamidos, traditional Muslim rulers, still hold great sway over their Fulbe subjects. Most large towns in the province have a lamido, and many smaller villages do as well. The various lamidos elect councilors to serve them; these may come from both Fulbe and other tribal groups. The Cameroonian government permits these rulers to hold their own courts and to keep their own jails, something human rights groups have pointed to as problematic.

Most other tribes in the region are nominally under the rule of a chief. However, these men are mostly just figureheads today. Among the Tikar, however, these individuals still hold a substantial amount of power. A group of advisers, or "Council of Notables", serves each Tikar chief. Below them are various ward heads (sous-chefs) who govern a specific portion of a village or town. The quarter chiefs (chefs de quartier) hold sway over a particular neighbourhood.

=== Education ===
The Adamawa's education level is generally very low. The nomadic Bororo rarely send their children to school. Meanwhile, town Fulbe often marry their daughters off early into puberty, and married girls do not go to school. The province has an estimated 80% illiteracy rate.

Another obstacle is lack of schools and teachers. Most schools are located in larger towns or in the capital, meaning that students often must travel long distances or live away from home, particularly at the secondary level. In addition, Cameroonian teachers who are assigned to the province often refuse to go on account of its remoteness.

=== Health ===
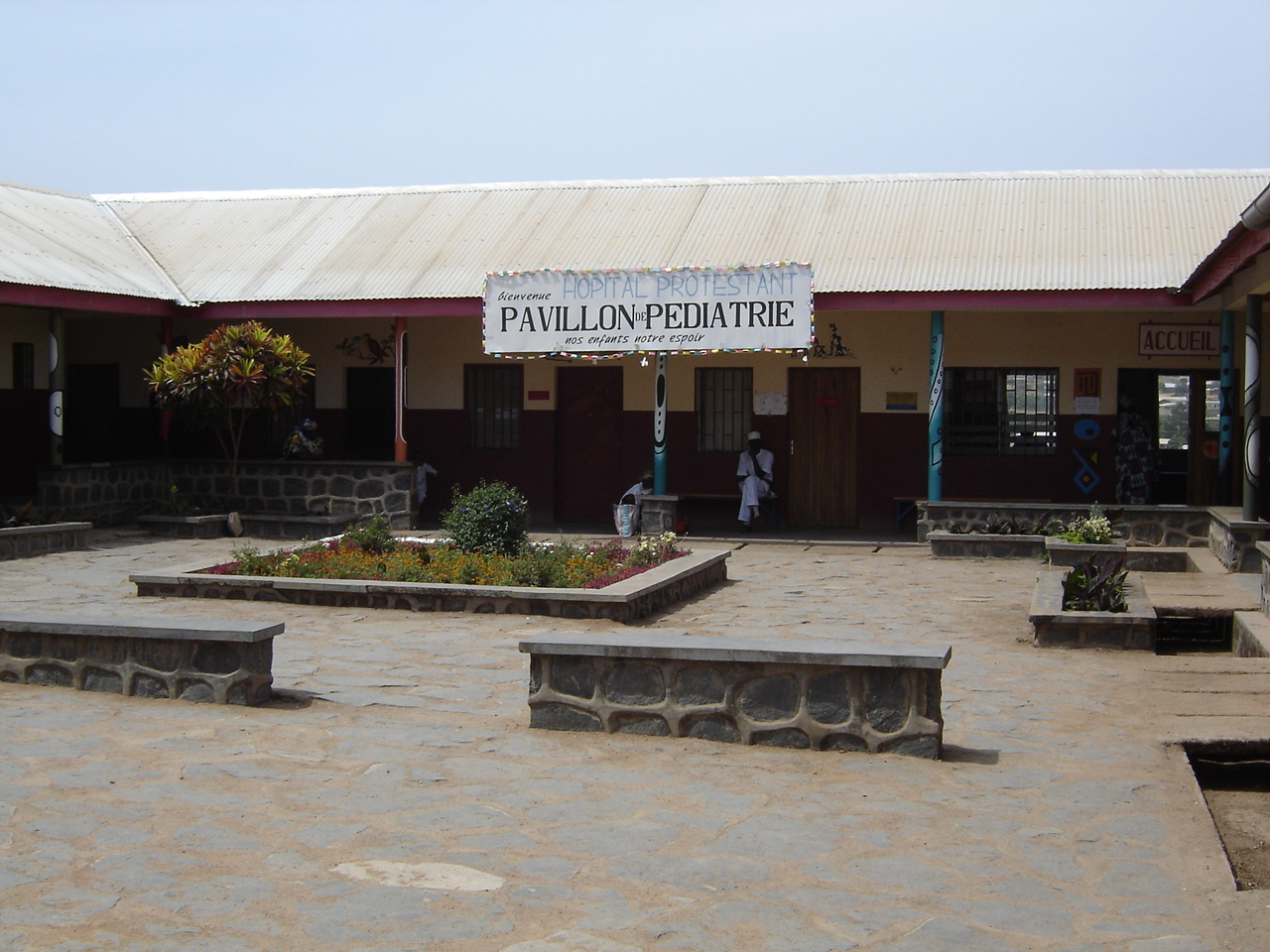
Ngaoundéré protestant hospital

Most of the Adamawa's towns have some form of health provider, if only a small clinic. The capital also has a hospital. The region's major health concern is lack of sanitation. This is especially pronounced in the increasingly urbanised Ngaoundéré. Another concern is HIV and AIDS. Official government figures give the province an HIV-infection rate of 17%, the highest in the country. These numbers come from samples in Ngaoundéré only, however, and infection rates in more rural areas are probably lower.

=== Cultural life ===
The Adamawa maintains a lively traditional culture. One notable example is the Menang, a Tikar dance. Performers may dance for any number of reasons, from aiding warriors to celebrating women's sensuality. Births, funerals, and weddings are often occasion for grand celebration among the region's non-Muslim populations, as well.
