= Dakkere =

- Coordinates: 6.84°N 14.23°E
- Country: Cameroon
- Region: Adamawa
- Department: Mbéré
- Elevation: 1,097 m (3,599 ft)

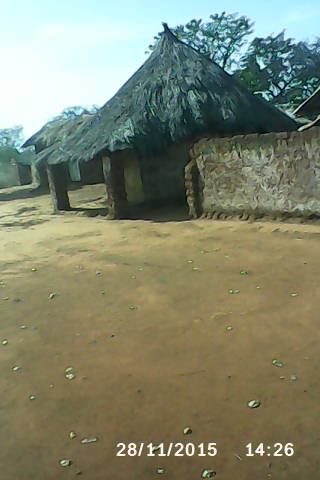
Residence of the chief of Dakkere

Dakkere is a small village in the arrondissement of Meiganga in the eastern part of the Adamawa Region of Cameroon.

== Geography ==
The flat terrain of the area is crossed by a river (Manbaka). The soil is primarily clay and is mostly black in colour, with some orange. There are very few rocks in the soil.

The climate is temperate with savannah and some scrub. The local vegetation consists of savannah, bush, and denser forest.

The first rains come in mid-April and they end in mid-September.

== History & politics ==
The village of Dakkere developed as a result of migrations of local peoples in search of pasturage for their herds. The combination of the lay of the land and the vegetation favoured settlement on the site of the village.

Dakkere is run by a traditional chief of the second degree. The Cameroon People's Democratic Movement and the National Union for Democracy and Progress are the main political parties.

== Population & economy ==
The widely spaced houses of the village cover an area of around 700 m^{2}. The people are a mixture of Fula, Mbere, Mbum and Gbaya people, some of whom are Christians and some Muslims.

The economy is based on the sale of agricultural products (beans, legumes, maize, potatoes), livestock, and apiculture.

== Infrastructure ==
The village has a small primary school with two classrooms for three levels (SIL_CP, CE1_CE2, CM1_CM2). After they complete their primary education, the students travel to the villages of Nyambaka or Gunbela, which have a college and a lycée. Less complicated health problems are dealt with by a nurse in the village, while more serious cases are transferred to the district health office in Babongo.

Transport from Dakkere to Babongo is mainly by motorcycle, while cars from Belel enable travel to other parts of Adamawa.
