= Bawaka =

- Coordinates: 6.35°N 14.33°E
- Country: Cameroon
- Region: Adamawa
- Department: Mbéré

Population (2005)
  - Total: 1,804

Bawaka is a village in the commune of Ngaoui in the Adamawa Region of Cameroon, near the border with the Central African Republic.

== Population ==
In 1967, Bawaka contained 420 inhabitants, mostly Wodaabe and Gbaya people

In the 2005 census, 1804 people were counted there.

== Bibliography ==
- Jean Boutrais, Peuples et cultures de l'Adamaoua (Cameroun) : actes du colloque de Ngaoundéré du 14 au 16 janvier 1992, Éd. de l'ORSTOM, Paris, 1993
- Dictionnaire des villages de l'Adamaoua, ONAREST, Yaoundé, October 1974, 133 p.
