= Babongo, Adamawa =

Babongo
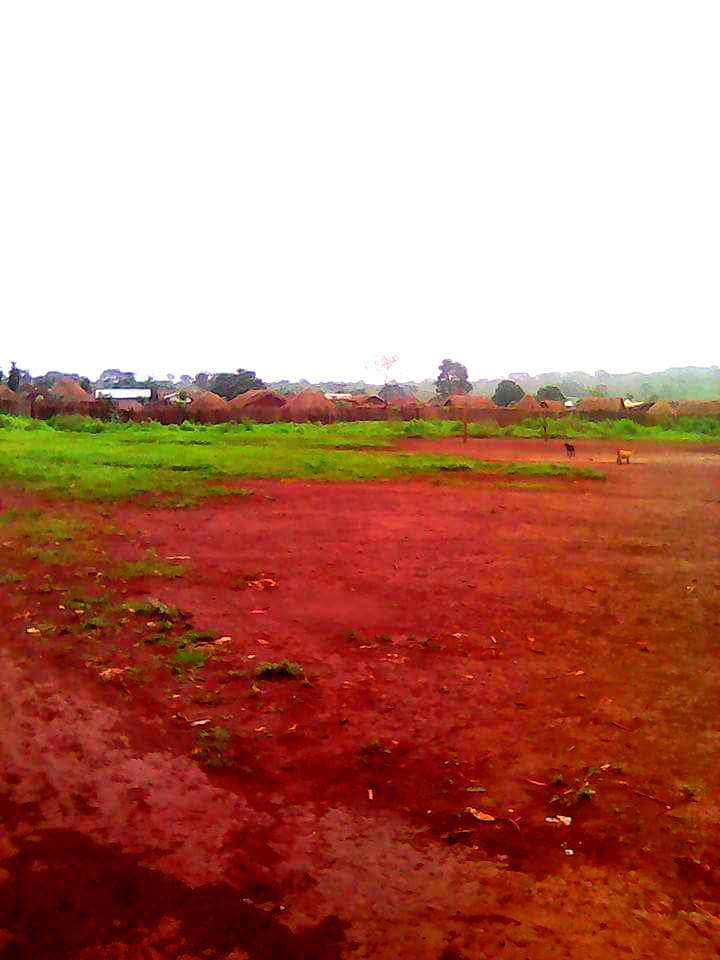

- Location in Cameroon
- Coordinates: 6.81°N 14.18°E
- Country: Cameroon
- Region: Adamawa
- Department: Mbéré
- Elevation: 1,129 m (3,704 ft)

Population (2015)
  - Total: 360

Babongo is a linear settlement in Mbéré, Adamawa Region, Cameroon. It is located on the N1 (Meiganga-Ngaoundéré) road, between the villages of Garga and Manbaka, about an hour and forty minutes' drive from Ngaoundéré.

== Geography and climate ==
The village is located on a flat plain at an altitude of 1129 metres above sea level. The soil is mostly orange in colour, with black areas and very few rocks. The vegetation is a mixture of savannah, thickets and a denser forest The climate is temperate. The first rains occur in mid-April and they end in mid-September.

== History ==
The village of Babongo developed from an intersection which linked Belel to Meiganga by an unpathed road without passing through Ngaoundéré. It has expanded as a result of the proximity of high tension power pylons and posts for a fibre-optic cable, which have enabled the village to be electrified and encouraged the formerly nomadic population to adopt sedentarism.

== Administration and politics ==
Babongo is administered by a traditional chief of the second degree. The CPDM, NUDP, and other political parties are active in the village.

== Demographics ==
The population of Babongo exceeded 350 inhabitants in 2015, settled in an area of more than 2 km.^{2} There is a primary school with four classrooms in three levels (Sil-CP; CE1-CE2; CM1-CM2). Further education has to be undertaken at the village of Garga, which has a secondary school. There is also a district office for health, well-digging, and drinking water.

The inhabitants of Babongo are Muslim and Christian. The mosque is located next to the chief's house and there is a small chapel for the Christians.

The main ethnic groups in the village are Fulani, Mbéré, Mbum, and Gbaya. They practice both agriculture and pastoralism.

== Economy and transport ==
The local economy is based on the sale of livestock, agriculture and the informal economy. Transport is mostly by motorcycle, private car, or hitchhiking with cars travelling along the Meiganga-Ngaoundéré road.
