= Kalaldi =

- Coordinates: 6.5000°N 14.0667°E
- Country: Cameroon
- Region: Adamawa
- Department: Mbéré
- Elevation: 1,020 m (3,350 ft)

Population (2005)
  - Total: 2,344

Kalaldi is a PBS Station in the commune of Dir in the Adamawa Region of Cameroon.

== Population ==
In 1967, Kalaldi contained 1614 inhabitants, mostly Gbaya people

At the time of the 2005 census, there were 2344 people in the village de Kalaldi and 10,600 in the canton of the village.

== Bibliography ==
- Jean Boutrais, Peuples et cultures de l'Adamaoua (Cameroun) : actes du colloque de Ngaoundéré du 14 au 16 janvier 1992, Éd. de l'ORSTOM, Paris, 1993
- Philip Burnham, Opportunity and constraint in a savanna society : the Gbaya people of Meiganga, Cameroon, Academic Press, London, New York, 1980, 324 p. ISBN 0-12-146060-6
- Dictionnaire des villages de l'Adamaoua, ONAREST, Yaoundé, October 1974, 133 p.
