= Koundé =

- Coordinates: 6.22°N 13.49°E
- Country: Cameroon
- Region: Adamawa
- Department: Mbéré

Population (2005)
  - Total: 753

Koundé is a village in the commune of Dir in the Adamawa Region of Cameroon.

== Population ==
In 1967, Koundé contained 255 inhabitants, mostly Gbaya people

At the time of the 2005 census, there were 753 people in the village.

== Bibliography ==
- Jean Boutrais, Peuples et cultures de l'Adamaoua (Cameroun) : actes du colloque de Ngaoundéré du 14 au 16 janvier 1992, Éd. de l'ORSTOM, Paris, 1993
- Philip Burnham, Opportunity and constraint in a savanna society : the Gbaya people of Meiganga, Cameroon, Academic Press, London, New York, 1980, 324 p. ISBN 0-12-146060-6
- Dictionnaire des villages de l'Adamaoua, ONAREST, Yaoundé, October 1974, 133 p.
