= Fada =

Fada may refer to:

== Places ==
- Fada, Chad, the capital of the Ennedi-Ouest region of Chad
- Fada, Nigeria, a town in central Nigeria
- Fada N'gourma, a town in eastern Burkina Faso
- Fada, Cameroon, a village in the Adamawa Region of Cameroon
- Loch Fada, Colonsay, a lake on the Inner Hebridean island of Colonsay, Scotland

== Abbreviation ==
- Federation of Automobile Dealers' Associations of India
- Federación Argentina de Ajedrez, Argentinian chess federation
- First Amendment Defense Act, 2015 proposed US legislation
- First Assistant District Attorney, a legal official in the United States

== Other ==
- Fada (social group), a type of youth conversation group in urban Niger
- Fada (síneadh fada), the acute accent in Irish orthography
- Fada Cola, a soft drink from Marseille, France
