= Daré =

- Coordinates: 7.04°N 15.03°E
- Country: Cameroon
- Region: Adamawa
- Department: Mbéré

Population (2005)
  - Total: 803

Daré is a village in the commune of Djohong in the Adamawa Region of Cameroon, near the border with the Central African Republic

== Population ==
In 1967, Daré contained 247 inhabitants, mainly Gbaya people

At the time of the 2005 census, there were 803 people in the village.

== Bibliography ==
- Jean Boutrais, 1993, Peuples et cultures de l'Adamaoua (Cameroun) : actes du colloque de Ngaoundéré du 14 au 16 janvier 1992, Paris : Éd. de l'ORSTOM u.a.
- Dictionnaire des villages de l'Adamaoua, ONAREST, Yaoundé, October 1974, 133 p.
