= Dozui =

- Coordinates: 6.43°N 14.28°E
- Country: Cameroon
- Region: Adamawa
- Department: Mbéré

Population (2005)
  - Total: 744

Dozui (also Dozoui) is a village in the commune of Meiganga in the Adamawa Region of Cameroon, near the border with the Central African Republic.

== Population ==
In 1967, Dozui contained 363 inhabitants, mostly Gbaya people and Wodaabe

At the time of the 2005 census, there were 744 people in the village.

== Bibliography ==
- Jean Boutrais, 1993, Peuples et cultures de l'Adamaoua (Cameroun) : actes du colloque de Ngaoundéré du 14 au 16 janvier 1992, Éd. de l'ORSTOM, Paris
- Philip Burnham, Opportunity and constraint in a savanna society : the Gbaya people of Meiganga, Cameroon, Academic Press, London, New York, 1980, 324 p. ISBN 0-12-146060-6
- Dictionnaire des villages de l'Adamaoua, ONAREST, Yaoundé, October 1974, 133 p.
