= Ngoutéré =

- Location in Central African Republic
- Coordinates: 6°46′20″N 15°53′53″E
- Country: Central African Republic
- Prefecture: Ouham-Pendé
- Sub-prefecture: Bocaranga
- Commune: Pendé

Ngoutéré, also written Ngoutere, is a village situated in Ouham-Pendé Prefecture, Central African Republic.

== History ==
An unnamed armed militia attacked Ngoutéré on 7 December 2013 morning and killed seven people.

3R rebels from Koui occupied Ngoutéré in July 2018. Later, they withdrew from the village. Five hundreds villagers fled to Sangami and Tolé on 15 February 2019 due to fear of revenge following an attack on herders in the village.

Wagner reportedly looted shops and homes in Ngoutéré in September 2021. FACA imposed a curfew in Ngoutéré from 6:00 pm to 6:00 am in March 2023 due to the threat of CPC's incursion following the withdrawal of Wagner in February.

An unknown armed group stormed the FACA position in Ngoutéré on 2 July 2024 at 3:00 am. Five soldiers were killed and two were abducted.

3R rebels attacked FACA in the village on 11 September 2024 morning, killing four soldiers. Later, the 3R militia withdrew from the village.

== Education and health ==
There is a school in the village. Ngoutéré has one health post and it covers surrounding villages such as Galanga and Baforo.
