= Mbella-Ngou =

- Coordinates: 6.49°N 14.39°E
- Country: Cameroon
- Region: Adamawa
- Department: Mbéré

Population (2005)
  - Total: 1,664

Mbella-Ngou (also Mbelangou, Mbella-Ngon) is a village in the commune of Djohong in the Adamawa Region of Cameroon, near the border with the Central African Republic

== Population ==
In 1967, Mbella-Ngou contained 715 inhabitants, mainly Fula people.

At the time of the 2005 census, there were 1664 people in the village.

== Bibliography ==
- Jean Boutrais, 1993, Peuples et cultures de l'Adamaoua (Cameroun) : actes du colloque de Ngaoundéré du 14 au 16 janvier 1992, Paris : Éd. de l'ORSTOM u.a.
- Dictionnaire des villages de l'Adamaoua, ONAREST, Yaoundé, October 1974, 133 p.
