= Sangami =

- Location in Central African Republic
- Coordinates: 6°51′19″N 15°46′33″E
- Country: Central African Republic
- Prefecture: Ouham-Pendé
- Sub-prefecture: Bocaranga
- Commune: Pendé

Sangami is a village situated in Ouham-Pendé Prefecture, Central African Republic.

== History ==
In 2016, Anti-balaka militias controlled the village.

The attack in Ngoutéré on 2 July prompted the residents to flee from Sangami.

== Economy ==
Sangami has a weekly market.

== Healthcare ==
The village has one health post.
