= Bokaya =

- Location in Central African Republic
- Coordinates: 6°52′51″N 15°33′15″E
- Country: Central African Republic
- Prefecture: Ouham-Pendé
- Sub-prefecture: Bocaranga
- Commune: Bocaranga

Bokaya, also spelled Boukaya, is a village situated in Ouham-Pendé Prefecture, Central African Republic.

== History ==
An unnamed militia launched an unsuccessful attack in Bokaya on 26 October 2016. Nevertheless, 230 villagers fled to Bouar and others went to the bush for preventive action.

An armed group attacked MINUSCA patrol convoys in Bokaya on 3 January or 5 January 2017, killing one Bangladesh soldier named Abdur Rahim.

3R rebels occupied the Bokaya until they withdrew on 24 May 2019 following MINUSCA demand. However, they returned to the village on 18 June. Between 7 and 8 September 2020, there was a clash between 3R rebels and FACA in Bokaya.

== Education ==
There is a school in Bokaya.

== Healthcare ==
Bokaya has one health center that caters to surrounding villages, such as Koutende, Moundi, Kpokeya, Nambori.
