= Gunbela =

- Coordinates: 6.67°N 14.20°E
- Country: Cameroon
- Region: Adamawa
- Department: Mbéré
- Elevation: 3,349 m (10,988 ft)

Population
  - Total: 894

Gunbela is a village on the Route nationale 1 in the Adamawa Region of Cameroon.

== Geography ==
The climate is temperate and the vegetation is savannah.

== Infrastructure ==
There is a CES for secondary education at Gunbela, as well as a public primary school for all levels (SIL-CP, CE1-CE2, CM1-CM2) and a kindergarten with several grades. The village also has a health centre.

== Demographics ==
The people of the village are Gbaya and Fula people; they are a mixture of Catholic and Muslim.

In cultural matters Gunbela is led by a traditional chief. The most common traditional dish in the village is the "kamgeda", which consists of roast beef and manioc couscous.

== Economy and transport ==
The economy is based on agriculture and the sale of agricultural products, like sweet potatoes, arrowleaf elephant's ear, various legumes, melons, and fruits. There is a periodic market at which these goods are sold.

Transport is by motorcycle and public transport cars.

== Notable people ==
Aboubakar Kombo, mayor of the commune of Meiganga resides in the village.

Djouldé Adjia is the current chief
