= Ndawé =

- Coordinates: 6.54°N 14.46°E
- Country: Cameroon
- Region: Adamawa
- Department: Mbéré

Population (2005)
  - Total: 366

Ndawé is a village in the commune of Djohong in the Adamawa Region of Cameroon, near the border with the Central African Republic

== Population ==
In 1967, Ndawé contained 14 inhabitants, mainly Wodaabe.

At the time of the 2005 census, there were 366 people in the village.

== Bibliography ==
- Jean Boutrais, 1993, Peuples et cultures de l'Adamaoua (Cameroun) : actes du colloque de Ngaoundéré du 14 au 16 janvier 1992, Paris : Éd. de l'ORSTOM u.a.
- Dictionnaire des villages de l'Adamaoua, ONAREST, Yaoundé, October 1974, 133 p.
