= Fada, Cameroon =

Fada
- Coordinates: 6.43°N 14.28°E
- Country: Cameroon
- Region: Adamawa
- Department: Mbéré

Population (2005)
  - Total: 1,048

Fada (also Fata) is a village in the commune of Meiganga in the Adamawa Region of Cameroon, near the border with the Central African Republic.

== Population ==
In 1967, Fada contained 1267 inhabitants, mostly Wodaabe and Fula people

At the time of the 2005 census, there were 1048} people in the village.

== Bibliography ==
- Jean Boutrais, Peuples et cultures de l'Adamaoua (Cameroun) : actes du colloque de Ngaoundéré du 14 au 16 janvier 1992, Éd. de l'ORSTOM, Paris, 1993
- Dictionnaire des villages de l'Adamaoua, ONAREST, Yaoundé, October 1974, 133 p.
