= Koui =

Sub-prefecture of Ouham-Pendé in the Central African Republic

- sub-prefectures and town
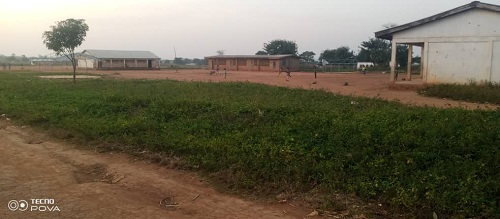
- Koui town

- Location in Central African Republic
- Country: Central African Republic
- Prefecture: Ouham-Pendé

Government
  - Sub-Prefect: Larry Mahalba Nordine

Koui is a sub-prefecture of Ouham-Pendé in the Central African Republic.

== Geography ==
The commune of Koui borders Cameroon, and is west of Bocaranga. It is bounded on the east by the Ngou tributary of the Mbere River which forms the border with Cameroon.

Communes bordering Koui
	Mbili	Kodi
Djohong		Bocaranga
Niem-Yéléwa	Herman-Brousse	

== History ==
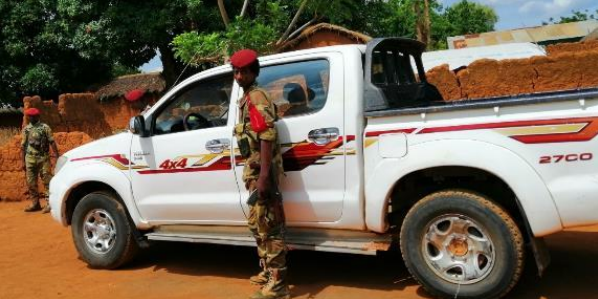
3R fighters in Koui, 2017

After the death of General de Gaulle, President Bokassa renamed the town on the Koui River as a tribute to the French President. The Koui administrative checkpoint is erected as a sub-prefecture from September 21, 1981 by dismemberment of the sub-prefecture of Bocaranga.

On 27 September 2016 Return, Reclamation, Rehabilitation militia attacked Koui killing 14 civilians. On 17 August 2020 Koui was recaptured by government forces. On 29 May 2021 it was again recaptured by government forces.

== Administration ==
The commune of Koui, is the only commune of the sub-prefecture. It is one of seven breeding communities in the Central African Republic, created with the aim of giving a land and land base to Mbororo Fulani pastoralists. The mayor of the breeding commune of Koui extends his influence on the breeders of the prefectures of Ouham-Pendé and Ouham.

== Villages ==
The main villages are Mbossarou, Koui, Sangolodoro and Ngeng-Nzeung.

The commune has 114 villages in rural areas identified in 2003: 5 km, Alache, Ardo-Djobdi, Badi, Bakoussa, Bang, Banon-Yerimon, Baria, Belaka, Belke, Bere, Bezere 2, Bi, Bita 2, Boboye, Bocaranga- Koui, Bogang 6, Bogang 6, Bogang Crossroads, Bogang-Mere, Bomango, Bomari 2, Bonawala, Boraguel, Bossabina 2, Bossabina-Sokorta, Bossarou, Bouzou 2, Bowai 2, Boyaye-Baria, Boyay-Koubili, Boyay-Wantounou, Boyaywantounou 2, Bozockwe-Bomaki 1, Bozokwe Biri, Degaule-Chic, Dewa 1, Dock, Dole, Douknoumon, Doza, Doza-Wahorou, Edem, Foulbere, Gassol-Zoda, Gbabiri-Boyaye, Gbabiri-Mbartoua, Gbabiri-Mbindao, Gbafou, Gbenou, Gbozockwe-Wosso, Goedi-Koui, Goidi 1, Goidi 2, Gombou, Gounzai, Iyazabo 1, Iyazabo 2, Iyazabo 3, Jean 0, Bass, Kare, Kayala, Kayang, Kazanga, Kella-marrow 1, Kella-Moelle 2, Kella-Moelle 3, Kpetene, Kpokwane, Customs, Lamourde, Lima, Makounzi-Wali, Mbella, Mbodala, Mboneguene, Mboussara, Mother, Moinam, Momaye, Moum-Di, Ngore, Ngueng-Nzeung, Nzakoundou, Pana, Pana 1, Pana 2, Patasse, Piti, Popular, Saah 1, Saah 2, Safou, Sangoldoro, Sanguere 3 Mbororo, Sanguere 3 Muslim, Sanguere-Bombaye, Sanguere-Lim, Segdou, Tassi, Tigun, Toro, Toubanco 3, Toubanko 1, Toubanko 2, Wantiguira, Wantiguira 1, Wantiguira Muslim, Yazi, Youma 1, Youma 2, Youma 3, Youwele, Zoguel.
