= Black masculinity in American media =

Masculinity, often linked to manhood, encompasses traits, behaviors, and roles traditionally associated with men. In Western societies, masculinity is often characterized by strength, leadership, and independence. For African American men, this identity intersects with broader societal and cultural norms shaped by historical subjugation and systemic oppression. In We Real Cool: Black Men and Masculinity, the author bell hooks argues that historical factors like slavery and systemic oppression shaped notions of Black masculinity, pushing some men to adopt hyper-masculine traits for survival and recognition. African American masculinity both adapts to and resists dominant narratives, such as hegemonic masculinity often tied to White culture, while facing scrutiny in various social settings. This complex identity reflects adaptation, resistance, and the influence of historical and ongoing racial dynamics.

== History ==
Black masculinity in America has been profoundly shaped by historical forces, beginning with the slavery and continuing through ongoing struggles with systemic racism and marginalization. According to author bell hooks, Black masculinity emerged in part as an adaptation to the dominant white, patriarchal norms observed during and after slavery, as Black men sought ways to assert their identities in a society that often dehumanized them.

Following the end of slavery in the United States, Black men faced new but complex challenges in the Reconstruction era, which saw limited gains alongside rising racial violence and restrictive laws designed to control Black bodies. Cultural theorist Stuart Hall has suggested that race in Western society has consistently functioned as a social construct designed to enforce social and economic hierarchies, influencing how Black men have been perceived in American culture. This racially coded view of Black masculinity has filtered through generations, often appearing in media representations as caricatures of either brute strength or docile servitude, stereotypes that persist and evolve today.

During the civil rights movement, Black masculinity in the media began to reflect the complexity of Black male identities in new ways, as seen in figures like Muhammad Ali and Malcolm X, who publicly embodied confidence, resilience, and defiance against societal norms. At the same time, portrayals of Black men in 20th-century media also began to reflect growing concerns about social justice, sometimes leaning toward caricature but also sparking discussions about Black identity and power.

The rise of hip hop in the late 20th century marked another major shift in representations of Black masculinity, as rap artists began using their music to confront issues of race, class, and masculinity head-on. By asserting control over their own narratives, Black men in hip hop helped redefine Black masculinity for modern audiences, embodying both resistance to and a reinterpretation of traditional masculinity. However, these portrayals have remained complex, as some forms of hypermasculinity in hip hop also reinforced stereotypes of aggression and violence. In his book titled Lost Boys: Why Our Sons Turn Violent and How We Can Save Them, author James Garbarino's writings question where boys learn the meaning of being a man. He explains that they get their inspiration from mass media and the most visible men in their community.

== Examples ==
=== In film & TV ===
The portrayal of Black masculinity in Blaxploitation films such as Shaft and Dolemite emphasized toughness and independence, creating heroic yet stereotypical Black male figures. Later, '90s "hood" movies such as Menace II Society, Juice, and Boyz n the Hood showcased young Black men navigating violence, poverty, and identity, offering a more grounded but sometimes controversial view.

=== In music ===
In the 1980s, hip hop emerged as a voice for Black communities, with groups like Public Enemy and N.W.A addressing social injustices and resistance against oppression. As the genre evolved into gangsta rap in the 1990s, artists like 2Pac and Ice-T emphasized themes of survival, resilience, and hyper-masculinity. These portrayals both challenged and reinforced specific images of Black masculinity, sparking widespread cultural and societal discussions.

== Alternative masculinity ==
Alternative masculinity offers a different approach to Black male identity, challenging dominant notions of strength and toughness. bell hooks explores how non-traditional forms of masculinity can open space for vulnerability, creativity, and self-expression.

=== Portrayal of alternative Black masculinity in media ===
Media such as Moonlight and Atlanta depict alternative visions of Black masculinity, exploring themes like sexuality, emotionality, and vulnerability. These works push back against stereotypes, providing a nuanced portrayal of Black men. In music, artists like De La Soul, Outkast, and Tyler, the Creator represent alternative masculinity, blending creativity with introspective lyrics that defy typical narratives.

== Notable theorists ==
- bell hooks
- James Baldwin
- Stuart Hall
- E. Patrick Johnson
- Michael Eric Dyson

== See also ==
- Representation of African Americans in media
- African-American culture
- Imaging Blackness
