= Bouzou, Central African Republic =

Bouzou
- Location in Central African Republic
- Coordinates: 6°50′41″N 15°10′43″E
- Country: Central African Republic
- Prefecture: Ouham-Pendé
- Sub-prefecture: Koui
- Commune: Koui

Bouzou is a village situated in Ouham-Pendé Prefecture, Central African Republic.

== History ==
There was a clash in Bouzou on 21 November 2015, prompting the residents to flee to Makounzi-Wali, Yade, and Mbikamba. In September 2016, 3R rebels attacked Bouzou.

A clash between rebels and the government forces occurred in Bouzou on 20 August 2021. Two civilians were killed, and the residents sought refuge in the bush, Koui, Bocaranga, and Cameroon. Wagner mercenaries massacred women and children in Bouzou on unknown date of August 2021. FACA and Wagner clash with 3R rebels in the village on 23 August. Wagner and FACA burned several houses and a mosque in Bouzou on 6 October, causing the residents fled either to Cameroon or the nearby settlements.

== Education ==
The village has one school.

== Healthcare ==
There is an health post in Bouzou.
