= Bouzou =

Bouzou is a surname. Notable people with the surname include:

- Joël Bouzou (born 1955), French athlete
- Nicolas Bouzou (born 1976), French economist and essayist

== See also ==
- Bouzou, Central African Republic, village
- Ikelan, Tuareg caste
