= Mboko-Tatale =

- Location in Central African Republic
- Coordinates: 6°32′42″N 16°3′45″E
- Country: Central African Republic
- Prefecture: Ouham-Pendé
- Sub-prefecture: Bozoum
- Commune: Kouazo

Mboko-Tatale, also written Mboko-Tataley, is a village situated in Ouham-Pendé Prefecture, Central African Republic.

== History ==
Anti-balaka stormed Mboko-Tatale and killed its Muslim residents on 7 December 2013. An alleged 45 3R rebels captured the village on 11 September 2018, causing fear among the villagers.

== Education ==
There is a school in Mboko-Tatale.

== Healthcare ==
Mboko-Tatale has one health post.
