= Auvergnat Cola =

French soft drink brand

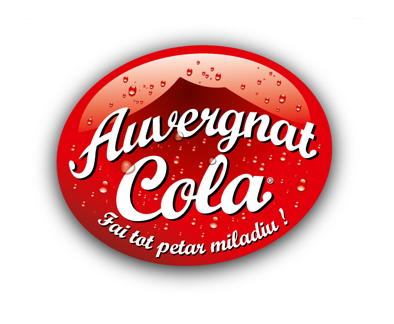
Company logo

Auvergnat Cola is a French soft drink brand founded in 2009 in Auvergne by the societé Julhes, based in Saint-Flour, Cantal, to market an alternative cola drink. In March 2011 it was acquired by Audebert Boissons, based in Bort-les-Orgues.

== History ==
The origins of Auvergnat Cola lie with Jean-Philippe Nicolaux, head of the societé Julhes, a tripe production company, who wanted to diversify his company's products. After looking for a possible niche product, he turned his attention to mass consumer products, seeking one with strong regional popularity and identity, but which would not have a local competitor or require large-scale production and reduced profit margins. He was convinced that this type of product is only viable as an adjunct to an existing enterprise, where it can be added to the existing structure of the business and economies of scale be realised by that means. The idea of Auvergnat Cola came to him when he was on holiday in Corsica and was drinking the local Corsica Cola. (Other pre-existing regional colas in France included Breizh Cola in Brittany, Fada Cola in Marseille and Chtilà Cola, since renamed Ch'nord Cola, in Nord-Pas-de-Calais, and Meuh Cola in Normandy, Montania Cola in Chambéry and Poitou Cola have since been launched.)

=== Initial goal ===
The brand's initial objective was to appeal to Auvergne's apple growers, consumers, food service professionals, and Parisianians owners of the bars and brasseries that succeeded Auvergne-style bougnats. The minimum order required to start production was 20,000 units, and the break-even point was 50,000 units.

The cola recipe was intentionally as close as possible to that of Coca-Cola, because customers were used to it, but with the addition of gentian for a regional touch.

=== Targets ===
In the first phase, the commercial targets were to be regional: restaurant operators, large retailers that were already customers of Julhes, and, to broaden the customer base beyond those who usually bought tripe, local drink distributors.

=== Implementation ===
Planning and preparation included the cola recipe and decisions about the name, a slogan—Faï Tot Petar miladiu (local dialect variously glossed as "It's going to make everything explode" and "It makes everything fizz, nom de Dieu"), the bottle shape and the label design featuring a volcano, and lasted from October to December 2008. The first sample presentation of the product took place at SIRHA, the international food and hospitality trade fair in Lyon and immediately led to orders. The Julhes display, usually not busy, had queues in front of it. In four days, the first lot of 20,000 bottles sold out prior to production and customers excitedly awaited the actual appearance of the product. The official launch was at the agriculture trade fair on 25 February 2009, when bottles of Auvergnat Cola were finally available.

In the media and on the internet, there has been appreciation for the humorous way the product is presented, its rebel side and its down-to-earth and regional aspects, in complete contrast to the current tendency towards globalisation of business and reminiscent of a mosquito attacking a giant of the fizzy drink business. The associated blogs, particularly on Facebook, are often well trafficked.

=== Goals reached ===
The goal had been to sell the minimum initial production of 50,000 units within the first year; actual sales had reached 500,000—10 times that—after three months and 750,000 after four months. Initial orders were renewed, which seemed to be a sign that customers were beginning to form a habit of buying the product, after initially trying it out of curiosity. Reorders from vendors demonstrated that the public liked it. Auvergnat Cola had also brought considerable attention to Julhes, and there was an unexpected degree of identification with it on the part of Auvergne businesses, cafés, restaurants and brasseries, and engagement with the brand's internet presence. Aurélien Rougerie, who plays international rugby for France and captains ASM Clermont Auvergne, volunteered to be a spokesman for the product.

Jean-Philippe Nicolaux arranged various partnerships for the brand, both with tastemakers such as Les toques d'Auvergnes, an association of chefs in the region which no longer serve any other cola, and with sports clubs which he sponsored with a donation of bottles of the product.

Production of 1 million units by the end of 2009 was an initial objective; this mark was reached in time for le quatorze juillet and two million by April 2010.

=== Jean-Philippe and Philippe ===
Jean-Philippe Nicolaux then decided to devote himself exclusively to Auvergnat Cola and to split it off from Julhes in early 2010. Seeking a business partnership for both production and distribution, he found Philippe Audebert, CEO of Audebert Boissons (beverages), a company founded in 1901 in Bort-les-Orgues by Jacques Audebert to sell lemonade and wine. Audebert already had an extensive distribution network and a bottling plant and in March 2011 acquired Auvergnat Cola, which has replaced their Le Bougnat brand of soft drinks; they now use that brand name only for their beers. Bougnat Cola had launched as a rival a few months after Auvergne Cola, although the brand name had been registered in 2004.

== Manufacturing ==
Glass bottles, sold in bars, are produced in Bort-les-Orgues. All other forms of the company's drinks are bottled near Perpignan.

== Products ==
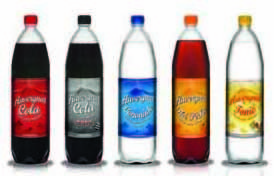
Various products of Auvergnat Cola

- Auvergnat Cola, the company's signature product, with the slogan Faï tot pétar miladiu, produced in all formats:

1.5-litre plastic bottles (for supermarkets)
Four-packs of 50-centilitre plastic bottles (for supermarkets and takeaways)
Six-packs of 33-centilitre plastic bottles (for supermarkets and takeaways)
Aluminium cans (for takeaways and soft drink machines)
33-centilitre glass bottles (for cafés, restaurants and bars)

- Auvergne Cola Zéro, originally with sucralose, now reformulated with a combination of two sweeteners to taste sweeter, more flavourful, and more like the original
- Auvergnat Tonic, a tonic water with a dash of gentian from the Auvergne Volcanoes Regional Nature Park
- Auvergnat lemonade
- Auvergnat Thé Pêche (peach tea), an uncarbonated, lightly sweetened drink flavoured with black tea and concentrated peach juice
