= Bocaranga Airport =

Airport in the Central African Republic

- IATA: none; ICAO: FEGC

Summary
- Airport type: Public
- Serves: Bocaranga, Central African Republic
- Location: Bokongo
- Elevation AMSL: 3,464 ft / 1,056 m
- Coordinates: 6°55′26″N 15°37′30″E

Map
- Location of Bocaranga Airport in the Central African Republic

Runways
| Direction | Length | | Surface |
| Direction | m | ft | Surface |
|---|---|---|---|
| 11/29 | 985 | 3,232 | Dirt |
- Source: Landings.com Google Maps GCM

Bocaranga Airport (ICAO: FEGC) is an airstrip serving Bocaranga, a town in the Ouham-Pendé prefecture of the Central African Republic.

The airport runs alongside the RR4 road at Bokongo, a hamlet 7 kilometres (4 mi) south of Bocaranga.

== See also ==
- Transport in the Central African Republic
- List of airports in the Central African Republic
