= Fada (social group) =

Type of conversation group in Niger

A fada is a type of social group in urban Niger, whose members, primarily unemployed young men, drink tea and have conversations. They meet at streetside locations in the evening. Fadas are inclusive toward members of differing classes and backgrounds, but female members are uncommon. Most unite friends who cannot find work, though some are composed of full-time workers or students. Fadas exist in cities across Niger, including the capital, Niamey. Young men view fadas as a part of their social identities and may spend a significant amount of time with them.

Fadas originated in the early 1990s, when Niger transitioned to democracy and the country's economy declined amid welfare cuts. After the government increased expressional liberties in 1991, young protestors in Niamey began meeting at night in public. These groups drank tea and referred to themselves with the Hausa word fada, literally referring to a royal court. As private radio was established in Niger, radio shows and hip-hop music became popular among fadas. A private radio host in Zinder inspired the city's first fadas. Fadas gained an informal role in security in the late 1990s, replacing the often violent yan banga groups. In the 2000s, they widely participated in bodybuilding, which declined amid associations with fighting. Around the 2020s, fada activities shifted toward civic engagement and activism.

Each fada has a meeting spot, visible from the street, where it meets daily. Meetings mostly begin in the early evening, sometimes continuing through the night, and also occur on weekends. Fadas meet at nondescript spaces visible from public streets. They mark their presence with street art on adjacent walls, containing the name of a fada, sometimes with artwork of varying complexity. Fada names are often inspired by aspirations, such as foreign place names, as well as personal values or popular culture. Most fadas are informally organized without hierarchies, though some assign members roles for leadership and rule enforcement.

A fada meeting is centered around the preparation and consumption of tea, typically green tea with sugar. One member prepares tea, following elaborate rituals, while conversation begins. Conversations are unstructured and private, enabling discussion of positive and negative topics. Other shared activities include listening to music, often hip-hop, and cooking food such as rice and beans. Fadas display interests such as fashion and romance, with members helping each other with dating and weddings. They hold activities such as dance parties at night that allow them to show off and to socialize with women.

Fadas have various missions; many provide security by keeping watch at night, with the support of neighbors, though some resemble violent gangs. Some fadas participate in political campaigns. Fadas also share resources and job-related information. Elders often perceive fadas as lazy. For youths, being in a fada allows self-expression and provides a sense of belongingness, as well as time management, to counteract against the boredom and idleness of unemployed life.

== Etymology ==
In Hausa, the national language of Niger, the word fada literally refers to a royal court or chief's council of elders—composed of men—as well as their courtyard or meeting location. More broadly, the word refers to a place where people hold meetings. The word is used to refer to conversation groups that meet to drink tea, a usage that has been loaned into Zarma, commonly spoken in the city of Niamey. This definition encompasses all groups with such meetings, regardless of demographics, so a group of adult civil servants may be called a fada; however, the concept is primarily associated with young men. In Hausa, the plural of fada is fadodi, but the French-style plural, fadas, is more commonly used. A member of a fada is known as a fadantché, a unique linguistic formation.

== History ==
=== Background and origin ===
Before fadas, Niger's youth organized themselves as groups that hosted parties or participated in state-run civic groups. After the country's independence in 1960, President Diori Hamani introduced a national network for the mobilization of rural youth. His successor Seyni Kountché created the samarya—a state-run version of a traditional Hausa youth structure—in 1976. This existed for thirty years, mobilizing rural youth to secure loyalty to the administration. Kountché's government also enacted strict curfews and police patrols, so people did not socialize outside their homes at night; thus, youth gatherings were largely controlled by the samarya. It ended during the country's transition to democracy in the 1990s.

Members of fadas attribute their origin to the democratization era, (Note: According to Adeline Masquelier, the historical narrative of fadas and democratization is "somewhat romanticized".) including the Kennedy Bridge massacre of 1990, during which the military killed three students who were peacefully protesting in Niamey. This sparked protests in support of democracy; several groups went on strike, and students in Niamey boycotted classes. After the National Sovereign Conference of 1991 increased freedom to discuss politics, students who participated in the boycott established informal conversation groups. The government lifted curfews, allowing meetings to continue late at night. They formed groups to have conversations in public spaces, drinking tea together, which made tea a part of Nigerien youth culture. Before this, tea consumption in Niger was primarily associated with the Tuareg minority.

The groups that met during these protests were the first fadas, applying the word fada to themselves due to its association with community assembly. They soon spread beyond Niamey. Fadas marked a shift in urban socialization, with youths freely discussing politics as freedom of expression was no longer restricted. Former fadantchés remember these early fadas as having introduced future politicians to each other and launched their careers.

The rise of the fada occurred amid a shift in Niger's economy that saw cuts to welfare spending and an increase in unemployment. The economic decline had begun in the 1980s, after the collapse of the country's uranium industry. Between the 1990s and 2010s, economic reforms were implemented to encourage fiscal responsibility and foreign investment, but these contributed to financial insecurity. The national government, previously considered a stable source of employment for educated people, reduced its number of permanent jobs, while the private sector lacked job opportunities. By 2019, the national government remained the largest employer, but less than one-third of its employees were permanent. As Nigerien society changed, fadas were no longer intended as political protest, instead being motivated by economic issues.

Around the world, particularly in developing countries, economic downturns of the 21st century left youths unable to become independent adults. As they waited for desirable jobs, young men in various regions experienced boredom and engaged in alternative forms of socialization. Widespread unemployment contributed to the popularity of tea among young men. Other types of tea-drinking conversation groups include the thé-chômeur, associated with unemployed youth in Mali, and the grin, which emerged during the democratization of Mali, Burkina Faso, and Ivory Coast. (Note: Anthropologist Ute Röschenthaler considers the fada a regional variation of the grin.)

=== Impact of private radio ===
As Niger became a democracy without restrictions on media, private radio stations were founded in several cities, featuring politics and music. Radio programs were popular among fadas across the country in the late 1990s and early 2000s. Talk programs invited youths to discussions, with some broadcasting fada meetings and interviews with fada leaders, which strengthened the recognition of fadas as a whole. Fadantchés also paid music programs for song requests with personalized greetings that listed people's names.

The emergence of private radio and television brought new ideas to the youth, including hip-hop, which became popular among fadas. Fadas are sometimes credited with the origin of Nigerien hip-hop in the 1990s; many fadantchés learned to rap, with some becoming successful musicians. One of the country's first hip-hop songs was titled "Fada Attayo" (meaning 'Tea Fada'), by the group Lakal Kaney; it contains lyrics from the perspective of fadantchés, asking "Who is going to give us jobs?"

The origin of fadas in the city of Zinder is associated with the introduction of private radio rather than political protest. The city's first private radio station, Anfani, was established in 1997. One of its presenters, David Ko, encouraged the city's youths to form organize benevolent activities and call in to say what they did. Radio listeners formed fadas (or "radio clubs") in all of the city's neighborhoods within a few weeks. They performed community work, such as cleaning public spaces and planting trees, without being interested in politics. Zinder's fadas were mixed-gender, and some had as many as 200 members. They were largely led by youths with successful occupations, while most also appointed adults as counselors, who helped with meetings without participating. They met weekly and collected weekly membership fees along with a fee to join. This money went partly toward radio greetings, which allowed emerging fadas to make themselves known and large fadas to highlight individual members; some purchased over 100 greetings per week, each listing five names. The largest fadas performed large projects; for example, the White House fada helped to build a school, and the Club Maxi fada hosted a performance by a theater troupe from Nigeria.

The mayor of Zinder attended most fada activities to build support, but his attempt to organize a rally of fadantchés failed. To facilitate collaboration between fadas and the government, he proposed the Fédération des Fada, des Clubs de Jeunes et Associations Assimilée (FFCJA; transl. Federation of Fadas, Youth Clubs, and Affiliated Associations), which was established in 1998 with the membership of 80 fadas, while 9 declined. They elected the leader of the federation, and the losing candidate founded a smaller, competing federation, the Union des Fadas Zindirma (transl. Union of Fadas of Zinder). The federations were not very active, but their regulations led fadas to gain formal recognition as organizations. Fadas remained largely independent of politics.

=== Development of activities ===
Niger's crime rate increased during the democratization era amid a poor economy and the closure of the Kountché government's security forces. Neighborhoods began being patrolled by private security forces known as yan banga. Yan banga were staffed by young men who lacked other jobs, and they often participated in violent vigilantism. Support for yan banga declined in the era following the coup d'état of 1996, and they were largely disbanded. Fadas took their place and began to play a role in their neighborhoods' informal security systems as they kept watch at night in front of people's homes. Neighbors began rewarding familiar fadas for keeping watch, and specific fadas gained positive reputations. Neighbors began to view their presence as beneficial, gradually increasing trust and acceptance toward fadas as a concept.

Fadas' ideals of toughness and masculinity were influenced by action movies that had become available in the country, featuring muscular actors such as Jean-Claude Van Damme, Arnold Schwarzenegger and Bruce Lee. By the early 2000s, fadas became involved in weightlifting and bodybuilding. They began cooking nutritious foods such as beans, as they associated a high-protein diet with building muscle. Many fadantchés built muscle to fight, often defending their fadas' honor through fistfights and knife fights against other fadas. Fadantchés' interest in bodybuilding declined by the end of the decade; they disliked its association with violence, and many elders considered fadas akin to the violence of yan banga.

Fadas surged in number in the 2000s and 2010s. They shifted their activities from bodybuilding to civic engagement; anthropologist Adeline Masquelier describes this as a shift in focus from themselves to others. Fadas were no longer focused on fighting crime but still had the role of keeping watch at night. Amid an emerging civil society in Niger, fadantchés conducted social activism. For example, once the Mali War began in 2012, they supported Malian refugees.

In Zinder, a more violent and criminal type of conversation group, known as palais, (Note: The word palais is French for 'palace', as a translation of the word fada.) arose circa 2007. They contributed to civil unrest in Zinder, being mobilized by local politicians. A violent protest in December 2011, responding to President Mahamadou Issoufou's visit to Zinder and the price of oil, included hundreds of palais members, many of whom were paid to participate. To integrate palais and fadas, the Mouvement des Fadas et Palais pour la Promotion des Jeunes (MFPPJ) was founded in May 2012. It was an initiative of palais members, supported by civic, religious, and parents' organizations, as well as a regional sultan and UNICEF, which provided training initiatives. The MFPPJ endorsed the Issoufou administration and denounced the 2011 protest. The organization collapsed amid a controversy surrounding its payment from government authorities.

During the COVID-19 pandemic in Niger, fadas at Abdou Moumouni University continued to meet as usual, despite an order against large gatherings. Fadantchés prioritized maintaining bonds with their groups.

== Members ==
=== Demographics ===
Fadas are social groups of unmarried young men, known as samari (singular: saurayi), a status below that of a full adult. It is not directly tied to age; a boy becomes a saurayi after puberty and becomes an adult man after marriage. (Note: As men are often expected to marry later than women, their status as youths lasts longer.) Thus, a boy may enter a fada as young as 12 or 13, and older members of fadas are in their late twenties. Nigerien culture considers work a requirement for manhood, discouraging idleness. Niger's population has a high growth rate and a high proportion of young people, contributing to unemployment. Youth unemployment is severe in cities. There are few job offerings for university students, who widely choose to remain unemployed rather than take an irrelevant job (although they often take temporary, low-paying jobs). As many samari cannot meet their aspirations to have jobs and families, they are in the situation of waithood, a transition phase before becoming a working adult.

A fada may be composed of neighbors or people who attended the same school; most are composed of childhood friends. While most fadas consist of unmarried men who cannot find full-time work, some fadantchés have jobs or are full-time students. In some fadas, a majority of members have jobs, while others, particularly in Niamey, are composed of university students who help each other with classes. Some consist mostly of married men. Fadas evolve as members remain in the group after getting jobs. When a member moves away or gets married, their younger sibling may join the fada; otherwise, a fada may disband once all members are adults.

Fadantchés are predominantly male, being conceived as a space for samari; some see it as a way to spend time away from girlfriends and families while growing into manhood. As a space of male socialization, the fada provides a contrast to matricentric households. It reflects Nigerien norms of gender segregation, limiting women's activities in public spaces, (Note: Islamic views often prohibit mixed-gender gatherings, and social activities in Niger are often single-gender. For this reason, some communities, including poor neighborhoods of Niamey, discourage women from interacting with fadas.) as well as gender roles that expect women to attend to domestic duties, preventing them from hanging out in the street. Young women (ʼyammata) are not expected to spend time at fadas; when greeted by fadantchés, they respond with a mumbled greeting, if at all, whereas samari typically return the greeting and may have a conversation. When ʼyammata join a fada meeting, it is seen as an interruption of the gendered social dynamic; activities such as drinking strong tea are considered masculine. Many fadas have no official barriers against women, while some state that they would be open to women if not for the expectations of elders. Fadas rarely include ʼyammata as members; the exceptions generally consist of classmates, as education provides mixed-gender socialization.

Besides being composed of young men, the composition of fadas is inclusive. A fada may have members of different social classes, religions, and levels of education. Some fadas are based around ethnic groups (as indicated by their names), but most are ethnically diverse; fadantchés value that friends of different ethnic groups are united by their shared experiences of poverty. In Niamey, fadas bring together people from various parts of the country, although some—particularly those composed of students—have members who share an ethnic or regional background. Some fadas are united by shared interests, such as music, religion, or sports.

=== Identity ===
Membership in fadas is part of the social identity of samari. They may join existing fadas or create their own, and they remain for months or years as they wait for adulthood. Among samari, it is socially unacceptable to be without a fada; according to Masquelier, this norm reflects the value placed on social interaction in Nigerien culture. Youths create performative identities through fadas, unlike adults with jobs and families, whose social status is already established without declaring the identity of their friend groups. Many people spend a significant portion of their time at the fada.

Fadas form a subculture with a unique form of language, borrowing slang terms such as crew from English, meuf (meaning 'girlfriend') from French, and farotage (meaning 'showing off') from the Ivorian vernacular Nouchi. Fadas are dynamic, adapting to follow trends or gain reputation. They adapt their use of language and coin idioms.

Fadas exist in urban neighborhoods across Niger. They are widespread across the capital city, Niamey, dominating its landscape at night, with a high concentration in the city center. Fadas are also found in the cities of Zinder and Dosso, as well as smaller cities such as Dogondoutchi. Zinder was estimated to have 320 fadas and palais in 2012, of which 72.5% were entirely male, 10.3% were entirely female, and 17.2% were mixed.

== Organization ==
=== Meeting places and times ===
Fada activity mostly begins in the early evening, and it may continue very late as members drink tea to stay awake. Activity in Niamey peaks around 7:30 or 8:00 PM, when the streets are not busy. It lasts until around midnight in most neighborhoods of Niamey, while in some older neighborhoods, it continues through the whole night. Fadantchés who have work or school usually arrive at the fada immediately afterwards; they may stay until night or appear only briefly before returning later. Muslim fadantchés may take breaks to pray at sunset and continue meeting until the isha prayer at night. On weekends, fadas are also active during the daytime, with members coming in and out throughout the day.

Fadas are meeting places. They meet at streetside spots that are either unoccupied or have other purposes during the daytime. A fada's founders choose a meeting place near their homes; possible locations may be next to a member's place of commerce or the home of a member with access to electricity or television. A fada may remain in the same place for years, even after the original members leave. A single street may have several areas claimed by various fadas. Meeting spots become known as belonging to their fadas, despite otherwise being nondescript public spaces.

Fadas usually meet at locations with no distinctive infrastructure, although some meet on benches or underneath trees. Their presence is also marked by tea-making equipment, as well as seats (chairs, stools, or plastic buckets) whose arrangement is usually centered on the tea. A minority of fadas specifically delineate boundaries, such as by placing line of bricks or a slab of cement, while a few meet under thatched coverings, whose construction may be sponsored by political candidates. Permanent structures are rare.

When a meeting is not active, the only indicator of a fada's place is a wall painted with the group's name. (Note: Some fadas use removable banners instead of painting on walls.) Most fadas have a single inscription, but some write on two or more nearby walls. They generally prefer large, smooth walls but may have to work around things such as windows. Some walls may contain the inscriptions of multiple fadas that share the space. As paint begins to fade, a fada may attempt to restore it, causing multiple layers of paint to be visible. Inscriptions from former fadas either fade away or get painted over by new fadas in the same spot.

Fadas' places are both public, being part of the street, and private, being occupied only by a fada. Despite being publicly visible, they resemble domestic spaces like courtyards where people meet privately. Their presence make youths visible, trangressing norms of public space as being controlled by elders. According to Masquelier, it enables youths with little social power to define new places, exemplifying the right to the city.

A fada's members are expected to be present every day; an absence may spark concern among fellow fadantchés. Whenever a member arrives, the rest of the fada pauses their activities to greet them with a handshake and give them a seat.

=== Names and artwork ===
Fadas have names to represent their individual identities. They often decide on a name soon after being created, and they ensure the name is visible on a wall. Fadas take pride in the stories of how they chose their names. However, not all fadas are interested in maintaining their names, as they may feel established enough that they can simply focus on their activities.

The names of fadas are inspired by personal values, interests, and aspirations. They convey meanings such as inclusivity, religiousity, political statements, or the act of tea drinking. Some names are rooted in local culture, such as idioms or nearby landmarks. Most, however, invoke foreign concepts. Some are named for foreign places out of aspiration, with such names as Brooklyn Boys, or they convey dreams of wealth with names like Money Kash. Other names describe social values, such as L'Union Fait la Force ('Unity Makes Strength'), a name shared by several fadas. Although most names are aspirational, some are self-deprecating references to the troubles of youths, such as Manger-Dormir-Recommencer ('Eat-Sleep-Restart') or L'Internationale des Chômeurs ('The International Unemployed'). Names with themes of criminality or violence are common, even among fadas with benevolent missions. Others are inspired by popular culture, such as hip-hop and martial arts. American hip-hop is particularly influential, with fadas using the names of rappers or English words such as "Black" and "ghetto".

Fadas inscribe their names on walls visible to the public, as a way to promote themselves. In addition to the name or initials of the fada, these may include an arrow pointing to the meeting place, or a simple symbol such as a dollar sign, heart, or star. They are primarily intended as signage, not art, though some fadas have complex, technically skilled murals, sometimes commissioned from professional painters. Before cementing and painting a wall, fadas usually seek the approval of property owners, which is usually granted. For some fadas, murals are more important to their visibility than names.

Fadas' inscriptions are drawn in various color schemes, often with bold colors that are highly visible against the wall (such as white and cyan). Some fadas paint their benches or teapots with the same colors, or wear matching uniforms. Some images are widespread among fadas, such as teapots, boomboxes, and men wearing Rasta caps. Among complex murals, many depict animals that symbolize toughness; other subjects may be inspired by popular culture, urban notions of coolness, or African American concepts of masculinity.

According to Masquelier, writing on walls is a form of placemaking that establishes fadas as part of their cities. It increases their visibility within their neighborhoods, like tagging by graffiti artists, and some are artistically influenced by graffiti. However, they are more legitimate and longer-lasting than graffiti and are not intended as provocative. They also differ from formal signage, being placed on relatively inconspicuous walls. Inscriptions may have references to youth culture or foreign popular culture, which are known within the fada subculture. Some fadas have signage that is inscrutable to elders or illiterate members of the public, conveying their secrecy and distinguishing them as insiders. In big cities, they may convey sophistication.

=== Structure ===
Some fadas are informally organized, and there is not necessarily a clear distinction between a fada and the rest of a community, though some have mission statements and governing boards. Most are non-hierarchical and egalitarian. Others have elected leaders, including a president, vice president, secretary, and treasurer, as well as rule-enforcing roles such as a counselor, controller, and judge. Other assigned roles may include a DJ and organizer during events.

An outsider must be introduced to a fada to sit alongside a meeting. A fada's members must approve for a new member to join, and the newcomer must commit to supporting the group and its members. Some fadas require interviews for new members, ensuring a sense of discipline important to fadas. Privacy and secrecy are important rules among all fadas. Thus, switching from one fada to another is seen as a betrayal and a threat to secrets, and some fadas establish punishments for members who do so. The sense of loyalty ensures the sustained existence of the group. An elder member or former member of a fada may still stop for conversation and gift some money, signalling their seniority.

Fadas adhere to various rules and rituals. Among younger fadantchés, detailed rules are often written down and kept by the secretary. Older fadantchés mostly follow unwritten rules of etiquette. Fadas widely expect members to display good manners and respect for each other, such as by avoiding offensive statements or gossip. Fadas have varying dress codes, and a few have uniforms, worn for fada-related special occasions. Some groups designate a "taxman" or taxeur who fines members for bad behavior. Members may be fined a few hundred francs for offenses such as swearing or fighting, while members who leave a fada may have to pay a few thousand. Some groups designate a counselor or mediator to deal with bad behavior, rather than collect fines.

== Activities ==
=== Tea-drinking and conversation ===
Tea being served in Niger

Fada meetings are centered around drinking tea. Fadas generally drink sweetened green tea, prepared in the Tuareg fashion; unlike bagged black tea, it requires a skilled, multi-step process and is always made for multiple people. Tea and sugar are important items for fadas, sometimes functioning as a currency. The brazier, teapot, and drinking glasses are also important and may be brought out even when tea is unavailable. Fadantchés value tea for its sensory impacts and for the experience of its preparation, not necessarily its taste.

The preparation of tea follows elaborate, fun rituals, led by a member of the group known as a teaman or shaiman (from the Hausa for 'tea', shai). The teaman measures out tea and water in optimal proportions before placing a small teapot over hot coals, controlling the heat, then adds sugar once it boils. The teaman then aerates the tea, repeatedly pouring it between the heated teapot and a metal cup, before pouring it into small glasses (though some groups instead share a single, large glass). The order of serving may be first-come, first-served or based on seniority. Members drink tea slowly, and a pot typically provides three servings, (Note: The three servings of tea are the subject of a saying that the first cup is bitter, like life; the second is sweet, like love; and the third is empty, like death. Fadantchés consider the second round to be the best for facilitating socialization. Many dislike the third round, viewing it as so weak that it is un-masculine, while view the first round as too bitter to drink.) taking one or two hours. The process is often repeated throughout the day. This process creates a familiar routine of teatime, seen as a way to kill time.

The primary function of fadas is conversation, which begins when the tea is being prepared. Conversations at fadas are unstructured, enabling discussion of positive and negative topics, as well as personal issues. Fadas allow youths to speak openly as they are in their own space, with conversations and opinions rarely being shared outside the group. They may engage in debates to distinguish themselves through their points of view and rhetorical ability. Other activities fill the time, particularly while waiting for tea to be ready. These include playing cards or backgammon, smoking water pipes, and watching sports on televisions or smartphones.

Fadas' discussions reflect the everyday lives of youths, with interests such as music, fashion, and dating. Members of fadas share advice on subjects relevant to adulthood, ranging from romance to finances. They support each other in romantic pursuits in various ways, acting for the social benefit of the fada as a whole. Fadantchés introduce new girlfriends to the group for approval, and certain members of a group may be delegated by the rest to speak to potential girlfriends. When members get married, fadas help plan and fund the wedding. They also share information to help find jobs, with current and former members forming a network. Some fadas are primarily focused on conversations about Islam. Fadas with formal structures may schedule a topic of conversation for each day of the week.

=== Other group activities ===
Members of a fada often listen to music together, and many youths have formed fadas with friends based on liking the same music. Prior to the popularization of smartphones, boomboxes were one of the most important objects for fadas as they gathered to listen to the radio. Many fadas were formed with the purpose of listening to music, particularly hip-hop. While many elders and Islamic authorities consider hip-hop haram, fadantchés view it as a genre that promotes truth and social criticism.

Fadantchés place importance on fashion, as they experiment with their own styles and aim to make impressions on others. Fadas may have rules to ensure presentable appearances, and they may encourage showing off with expensive clothing. Some fadas are distinguished through clothing that reflects their subcultures. Early fadas wore clothes influenced by hip-hop fashion, reggae, and Congolese dandies; later fashions imitated coupé-décalé musicians in the 2010s and Afrobeats musicians by the early 2020s. Fadantchés display their clothing—such as by posting photos on social media—in competition with other fadas; fadas have a sense of rivalry against each other, despite otherwise being built around friendliness.

Fadas cook food together, a behavior associated with households, increasing their togetherness. However, cooking is often done by female family members, or fadantchés may share food from meals that their families prepared at home. Rice and beans is a popular dish cooked by fadas. It uses the black-eyed pea, a staple in Nigerien cuisine but particularly popular among fadantchés, due to its satiation and simple preparation.

A fada's members share resources. Some fadas function as tontines, rotating credit associations, whose members provide money that is later repaid to them. Others are funded by providing municipal services, growing produce, or performing music. Fadas may provide financial support for everyday purchases; some members rely on fadas as their families are unable to provide for them. They may provide career training or startup funding, helping to create systems that reduce poverty. Fadas and similar groups also provide funds for members to migrate, including temporary migration within Niger. As most groups can only afford for one or two members to migrate, they collectively make such decisions.

=== Events ===
Fadas hold events at night, which often serve as a way to socialize with young women; the nighttime allows ʼyammata to join without parents' approval. A fada's social reputation is affected by the women it associates with, such as members' girlfriends. Dance parties may be free for women to encourage their presence, and fundraising events may be hosted by attractive women to attract interest.

Displays of masculinity are a common feature of fada events. They host dance parties and shows with the intent to show off, often taking weeks to prepare, during which members display their muscles and provide extravagant amounts of food. Before these events occurred, fadantchés displayed their masculinity through physical fights. Fadantchés associated muscle with masculinity and discipline. Bodybuilding, inspired by foreign movie stars moreso than local athletes, was a form of self-expression, as they otherwise lacked ways to express themselves. As fights between fadas no longer occur, they have been replaced with symbolic fights and other forms of competitition. Beginning around the late 2010s, some fadas have participated in carefully planned dance contests.

=== Public engagement ===
While all fadas form relationships between financially insecure youths, their particular goals differ. Some simply focus on conversation, with no particular agendas, while others function like NGOs. In contrast to fadas with civic missions, some function as criminal gangs, engaging in petty theft and dealing drugs such as amphetamines, and some add the opioid tramadol to their tea. Other fadas focus on art and music.

Many fadas play a role in security, being active at night when they can keep watch for criminals and track people entering the neighborhood. In the absence of official security forces, fadas gain support from neighbors, and shopkeepers sometimes reward them with tea, sugar, and beans. Fadas describe themselves as "making the neighborhood safe"; they boast about capturing thieves without inflicting violence. Many neighbors affirm that the presence of fadas decreases crime, though some worry about fadas getting into fights. As fadantchés contribute to security by sitting outside, they display a positive aspect to the idleness caused by their unemployment.

Some fadantchés become involved in violent vigilantism. In Zinder, such groups are known as palais, distinguished from fadas as they more closely resemble gangs. They are influenced by the masculine ideals of gangs in the United States, with activities focused on sex, drugs, and violence. Palais have hierarchical structures with an individual leader. They are particularly common in impoverished neighborhoods. People in Zinder often blame crimes on palais members. Members of palais and fadas may be targets of recruitment by militant groups such as Boko Haram and violent opposition politicians.

Samari often become politically involved through fadas. As political candidates must target the large demographic of youths to be successful, they stop at fadas during campaigns. Some fadas serve as headquarters for election campaigns, displaying the banners of their political parties. Parties often hire fadantchés, as well as members of women's associations, as brokers for their campaigns. Fadantchés may use networks of fadas to mobilize others to vote, which increases the recognition of their own fadas. Candidates also receive fadantchés' phone numbers to ensure they show up to vote. When political candidates visit fadas, they mostly speak about promises to their voters, and they may give gifts such as tea to buy their votes. This practice is satirized in the music video "Fada Flow" by Kaidan Gaskia 2, which depicts a vote-buying politician being rejected by a fada. After an election is complete, fadantchés often rally for the opposition. Although many fadas explicitly support political parties, many others are apolitical, and they may have a rule that members may not accept payment for votes.

== Role in society ==
Fadas allow young men to avoid boredom and isolation amid economic trouble. According to Masquelier, the boredom and idleness experienced by fadantchés makes them feel trapped in the present, with frustration and hope toward the future. The fada provides mutual care and a sense of belonging among people in similar situations, with many members viewing conversation as a useful way to deal with their worries.

A fada relies on trust and loyalty and enables self-expression without judgement. It enables members to reflect on their values and senses of purpose as they enter adulthood; they are often motivated by a desire to become functioning adults, viewing their activities as youths to be temporary. Samari often rely on fadas when they face problems, such as breakups or conflicts with elders. Some may view their fada as a chosen family, finding solace in shared activities.

The activities of fadas contrast with societal expectations of masculinity, which emphasize employment and family. Elders view fadantchés as being too reliant on their parents who work while the children do not, as well as being focused on unproductive matters such as fashion. They equate the fada with laziness and indulgence, describing samari as "sitting idly", a notion that samari may use self-deprecatingly. On the other hand, fadantchés blame their job insecurity on society, saying that the government fails to help the youth and that finding a job is impossible without connections. While elders widely consider tea drinking unproductive or lazy, fadantchés consider it a good use of time, calling it the "fuel of youth". According to Masquelier, the narrative that blames young men for their status is tied to the widespread perception of the crisis of masculinity. Many people blame social ills on fadas: parents say it introduces their children to drugs, preachers say it distracts them from the call to prayer, and newspapers associate it with poor performance on exams. Fadantchés are often seen as gangsters or hooligans. Fadas have worked to decrease this perception, emphasizing their positive activities and civic engagement.

The deliberate activities of a fada are a tactic for youths to escape their troubles. Tea provides energy and socialization, as well as a sensory experience and pleasant emotions to act against boredom. Its preparation gives unemployed youths a sense of time management that they otherwise lack, as they structure their time around the regular event of serving tea; they occupy themselves with its preparation and anticipate its consumption. According to Masquelier, the fada also provides a perception of stability, a sense of place, and an ethic of patience that builds collective hope, in contrast to the precarity of other aspects of life. Masquelier states that the fada is a place where people are active, despite being in a state of waiting, as they develop their skills and character.

== See also ==
- Culture of Niger
- Maghrebi mint tea – tea consumed by groups including the Nigerien Tuareg
