= Goroumo =

- Village
- Location in Central African Republic
- Coordinates: 6°38′24″N 15°33′0″E
- Country: Central African Republic
- Prefecture: Ouham-Pendé
- Destroyed: 2008

Population
  - Total: 0

Goroumo is a village in the Central African Republic prefecture of Ouham-Pendé, close to the western border with Cameroon, that in 2008 was attacked by bandits who killed almost all the male inhabitants. BBC reporter Mike Thomson wrote that many of the bandits were veteran fighters from past coups.
