= Mbéré Valley National Park =

National park in eastern-central Cameroon

- Location within Cameroon
- Coordinates: 6°59′40″N 14°47′46″E
- Area: 777.6 km^{2} (300.2 sq mi)
- Established: 4 February 2004

The Mbéré Valley National Park is a national park in eastern-central Cameroon.

== Location ==
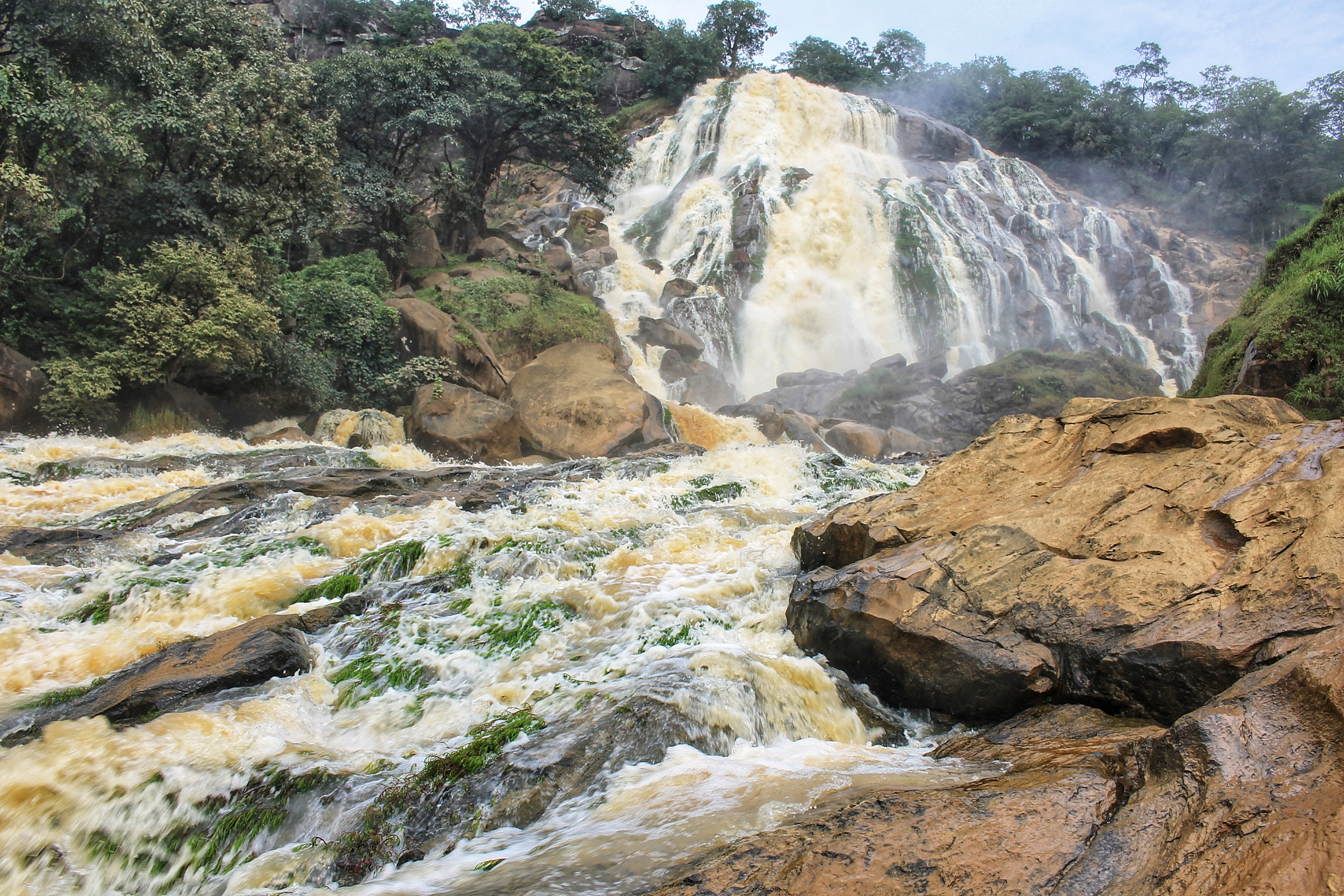
Lancrenon Falls, in Yamba village

The park is located in the Mbéré department of the Adamawa Region in the valley of Mbéré River. The western and northern borders form the river Koudini. From there, the River Bilao forms the northern border with the River Bassara. From the Bassara over the Mbéré to the Ngou, the park's eastern border runs. The most southerly point in the east is the waterfalls of Lanchrenon. The southern border runs from Bafouri via Borgou to the border of the Mbéré district. From there the western border runs back to the Koudini.

== History ==
The park was established on 4 February 2004 according to Decree N ° 2004/0352 / PM with the following aims:

- Protection of the water reserves for the south of Cameroon and preservation of the picturesque landscapes of the Mbéré Valley.
- Ensuring the continuity and flow of the river Mbéré.
- Promote the development of ecotourism to improve the living conditions of the local population
- Securing the habitat of species such as hippopotamus, African buffalo and mountain reedbuck.

Construction work in the park requires an official approval after environmental impact assessment. A development plan should regulate the rights of the local population. The plan defines a buffer zone of the park, as well as accompanying measures to promote socioeconomic activities for residents. The Ministry of Wild Animals also set up an administrative seat at the park. The Ministry of Environment and Forestry is responsible for further regulations on the principle of urgency.

== Flora and fauna ==
=== Flora ===
The area of the park can be described as a mixture of tree sway, wooded savannah and in the higher locations tree galleries. The vegetation is strongly influenced by the tree species Uapaca togoensis.

=== Fauna ===
In addition to the highly endangered Western mountain reedbuck (Redunca fulvorufula adamauae), one finds the olive baboon (Papio anubis), the sitatunga, the Defassa waterbuck (Kobus ellipsiprymnus defassa) and the bushbuck (Tragelaphus scriptus). From time to time, kobs (Kobus kob) and roan antelopes (Hippotragus equinus) pass through the park.

== Bibliography ==
- WWF, MINEF (2000), Deux missions de prospection de l'équipe WWF/PSSN dans l'Adamaoua Camerounais, pour une contribution à l'élaboration d'une stratégie de conservation de la biodiversité : Zones concernées : Tchabal Mbabo, Tchabal Ngandaba, Vallée du Mbéré (PDF; 1,6 MB) (PDF) (in German)
