= Djohong =

Coordinates: 6°50′N 14°42′E

Djohong Doumba
- Commune and town
- Interactive map of Djohong
- Country: Cameroon
- Region: Adamawa
- Department: Mbéré
- Elevation: 4,170 ft (1,271 m)
- Time zone: UTC+1 (WAT)

Djohong is a town and commune in Cameroon.

The village of Djohong dates back to colonial times. Originally it was located in the valley just NE of current Djohong and was named "Dzong."

== Population ==
Gbaya and Fulbe are the dominant ethnicities in the town with smaller representations of Mbororo, Pana, Tupuri, Bassa and Bamilike. This area of the Adamawa is considered the epicenter of Gbaya population in Cameroon.

== Mbere Valley National Park ==
The Mbéré Valley National Park is a protected nature zone consisting of 77,000 hectares. The biodiversity in the area is one of the main reasons why the Cameroonian government decided to protect the valley.

== Proximity ==
Djohong is located 160 km from the provincial capital of Ngaoundere and 90 km from Meiganga. Ngaoui is the nearest large town located 45 km to SE.

== Refugee population ==
The area surrounding Djohong has a significant refugee population from the Central African Republic.

== See also ==
- Communes of Cameroon
