= James Garbarino =

American psychologist (1947–2026)

James Garbarino (April 7, 1947 – March 7, 2026) was an American psychologist and author who was professor at Loyola University Chicago. He specialized in studying what causes violence in children, how they cope with it and how to rehabilitate them. Garbarino served as consultant or adviser to a wide range of organizations, including the National Committee to Prevent Child Abuse, the National Institute for Mental Health, the American Medical Association, the National Black Child Development Institute, the National Science Foundation, the U.S. Advisory Board on Child Abuse and Neglect, and the FBI. In addition, Garbarino's work is associated with the School of Human Ecology at Cornell University under the leadership of Urie Bronfenbrenner who began Head Start programs in the US.

== Life and work ==
Garbarino wrote on the causes of violent behavior in children and how they cope with stress. He studied the impact of war on children, including children in Kuwait, Iraq, Bosnia, and Croatia. Garbarino also conducted many interviews with children who have been convicted of violent crimes in the United States, concluding that abuse and neglect at an early age are contributing causes to the violent behavior of these children. He served as an expert witness involving issues of trauma, violence, and abuse in both civil and criminal trials. Garbarino and his coauthors also conducted many interviews with other high school students and teachers about bullying and social problems at school to help understand ways to improve the school environment.

He recommended that violence prevention begin at an early age by recognizing underlying causes and addressing them before they expand. Garbarino advocated programs that provide assistance to young at-risk children and parents, including a home visiting program that provides home visitors to young mothers at risk to help with child care and provide advice about child rearing. Children who have benefited from this program have reduced drop out and delinquency rates. He also advised intervention when there are problems in school at a young age with advice and counseling rather than punishment when possible. He believed this is often less expensive and more productive than waiting for problems to get worse.

Garbarino died in Ithaca, New York, on March 7, 2026, at the age of 78.

== Works ==
- Successful Schools and Competent Students (1981)
- The Psychologically Battered Child by James Garbarino, Edna Guttmann, and Janis Wilson Seeley (1986)
- The Future As If It Really Mattered (1986)
- What Children Can Tell Us: Eliciting, Interpreting, and Evaluating Information from Children. with Frances M. Scott (1989)
- Children and Families in the Social Environment (1992)
- Toward A Sustainable Society (1992)
- Raising Children in a Socially Toxic Environment (1995)
- Understanding Abusive Families: An Ecological Approach to Theory and Practice with John Eckenrode (1997)
- Children in Danger: Coping with the Consequences of Community Violence (1998)
- Lost Boys: Why Our Sons Turn Violent and How We Can Save Them (1999)
- And Words Can Hurt Forever: How to Protect Adolescents from Bullying, Harassment, and Emotional Violence with Ellen deLara (2001)
- Parents Under Siege: Why You Are the Solution, Not the Problem, in Your Child’s Life with Claire Bedard (2001)
- Por Que Las Familias Abusan De Sus Hijos with John Eckenrode (2001)
- An Educator's Guide to School-Based Interventions with Ellen de Lara and James M. Cooper (2003)
- See Jane Hit: Why Girls Are Growing More Violent and What We Can Do About It (2006)
- Children and the Dark Side of Human Experience: Confronting Global Realities and Rethinking Child Development (2009)
- Listening to Killers: Lessons Learned from My 20 Years as a Psychological Expert Witness in Murder Cases (2015)

== See also ==
- School shooting
- School violence
- Child abuse
- Family support
