= Adeline Masquelier =

American anthropologist

Adeline Marie Masquelier (born 1960) is a Professor of Anthropology at Tulane University in New Orleans, Louisiana.

== Biography ==
She received her baccalaureate in biology and physics (with honors) at Centre St. Marc, in Lyon, France (1978), her B.A. in Zoology (University of North Carolina at Chapel Hill, 1980), and M.A. in Anthropology (Southern Illinois University at Carbondale, 1984). She also received her Ph.D. from the University of Chicago in 1993 studying under the prominent Africanist and Anthropologist Jean Comaroff, and has done her field work among the people of rural Niger in the Hausa town of Dogondoutchi. Her research focuses have included spirit possession, reformist Islam, Bori religious practices, twinship, witchcraft, the pathology of consumption, medical anthropology, and gender. Currently she is the executive editor of the Journal of Religion in Africa (since January 2008) and is researching the Izala Islamic reformist movement in Niger, examining issues including bridewealth, worship, and dress.

== Awards and fellowships ==
- 1987- 1989 National Institute of Mental Health Dissertation Research Fellowship
- 1988-1989 National Science Foundation Dissertation Research Grant
- 1987-1988 Wenner-Gren Foundation for Anthropological Research Grant
- 2004-2005 American Council of Learned Societies Fellowship
- 2005-2006 National Endowment for the Humanities Fellowship
- 2010-2011 John Simon Guggenheim Memorial Fellowship

== Works ==
- Prayer Has Spoiled Everything: Possession, Power, and Identity in an Islamic Town in Niger ISBN 0-8223-2639-6 (2001)
- Behind the Dispensary's Prosperous Facade: Imagining the State in Rural Niger, Public Culture Vol.13, No.2 Public Culture 13.2 (2001) 267-291
- Dirt, Undress, and Difference: Critical Perspectives on the Body's Surface ISBN 0-253-34628-2 (2005)
- The Scorpion's Sting: Youth, Marriage and the Struggle for Social Maturity in Niger, Journal of the Royal Anthropological Institute, Vol.11, No.1 (March 2005).
- When Spirits Start Veiling: The Case of the Veiled She-Devil in a Muslim Town of Niger, Africa Today, Vol.54, No.3 (Spring 2008).
- Women and Islamic Revival in a West African Town. Bloomington: Indiana University Press, 2009. ISBN 9780253353665
- Bodies, Politics, and African Healing: The Matter of Maladies in Tanzania by Stacey A. Langwick. Bloomington: Indiana University Press, 2011.
- Regulating Romance: Youth Love Letters, Moral Anxiety, and Intervention in Uganda's Time of AIDS. Shanti Parikh. Nashville, TN: Vanderbilt University Press, 2015.
- Fada: Boredom and Belonging in Niger. ISBN 9780226624341(April 23, 2019)
