= Lost Boys: Why Our Sons Turn Violent and How We Can Save Them =

2000 book by James Garbarino

Lost Boys: Why our Sons Turn Violent and How We Can Save Them
- Cover
- Author: James Garbarino
- Language: English
- Subject: Juvenile delinquency
- Publisher: Free Press
- Publication date: August 15, 2000
- Publication place: United States
- Media type: Print
- Pages: Approx. 288
- ISBN: 978-0-385-49932-3

Lost Boys: Why Our Sons Turn Violent and How We Can Save Them is a 2000 book by the psychologist James Garbarino, in which the author details the epidemic of male youth violence in the United States.

== Part I ==
Garbarino makes use of various quantitative research, in addition to qualitative research in the form of interviews with juvenile delinquents in detention and violent boys on death row.

Garbarino addresses biological and environmental factors that contribute to aggression in boys, which in most cases is diagnosed by mental professionals as conduct disorder or chronic mis-behaviour.

Additionally, Garbarino discusses that youths with violent backgrounds are to be understood as boys rather than as miniature adult criminals. Several passages assist parents in revising how they think about their teenaged sons. He credits the work of Anna Freud for adding to the misconception that adolescence is a disconnect from childhood.

Attachment disorder in infancy is one potential cause for violent and/or aggressive teenagers, linking the childhood with future behaviour and demeanour. Kids who experience trauma in the form of parental or caregiver abuse may depart emotionally from their physical self, called dissociation. This may cause difficulties in feeling empathy and functionally socially, which Garbarino posits makes committing violent acts more likely.

== Part II ==
Since many youth who commit violent offences develop in physical and psychological environments that are overstimulating, effective treatment has to include a different, more soothing milieu for the youth. Garbarino provides preventive treatment plans and interventions, in addition to a systematic approach to reforming violent offenders.

In part 2 of his book, Garbarino details a comprehensive plan for both prevention and reclamation, which include but are not limited to:

- Programs for toddlers including a home visitor program offered to at risk mothers that help advise them on child rearing methods
- Early detection and treatment of aggressive behaviour in childhood
- Violence prevention programs in school
- Spiritual development
- Positive peer groups in adolescence.

The preventative interventions make use of family systems therapy, behaviour therapy, whereas the treatments for reclamation are largely cognitive behavioural and existential.

Garbarino criticizes the prison detention system that follows the boot camp model. He encourages the monastery model in its place, which has spiritual or religious leaders instead of wardens and disciplinarians. It encourages meditation and self-reflection in the adolescent inmates, expanding their understanding of how their violent acts effect both victims and society's perception of them and the community they come from.

== Critical response ==
- Elliot Pittel M.D. Department of Child and Adolescent Psychiatry at Tufts University School of Medicine, Boston says:

"Lost Boys makes an important contribution to the literature on the causes and prevention of youth violence."

- The book has also received praise from Marian Wright Edelman, President and Founder, Children's Defense Fund:

"Jim Garbarino sounds the alarm about the spread of youth violence—. Focusing on the hurt and social alienation that are at the heart of youth violence, he offers not only insight and compassion, but also steps that will lead to prevention and intervention."

- Michael Cunningham, at the Department of Psychology at Tulane University extends his mixed praise of the book:

"Garbarino addresses timely questions of biological and social influences of violence from an ecological perspective, and the results are very provocative."

However, as an academic, he experienced that some of the book's content "resulted in more questions than answers."

- Sharon G. Portwood, Assistant Professor of Psychology and Director of Women's & Gender Studies, University of Missouri-Kansas City, offers her response to Lost Boys:

"James Garbarino presents a logical and compelling analysis of not only why boys turn violent, but also how this transformation from vulnerable young boy to violent offender, and possibly even "killer," can be interrupted."

- Deborah Lazarus Psy.D. says of Lost Boys:

"All in all, he has tackled an extremely difficult topic and done a very admirable job of making some sense of it and recommending ways to improve things."
