= Fada cola =

French cola soft drink

Fada Cola
- Type: soft drink
- Flavour: cola
- Website: Fada Cola

Fada Cola is a locally distributed cola soft drink produced in Marseille. The name fada is the Marseille version of the French word "fou", meaning "mad".

Fada Cola's catchphrase is Qui ne boit pas Fada ne vient pas de marseille!; it translates into English as If you don't drink Fada you're not from Marseille. Thus, it plays on the local factor, which is a selling point since many Marseillais are proud of their hometown. As a result, the company is currently selling 1 million units per week.
