= Ngaoui =

Coordinates: 6.6000°N 14.9000°E

- Commune and town
- Location in Cameroon
- Country: Cameroon
- Region: Adamawa
- Department: Mbéré
- Time zone: UTC+1 (WAT)

Ngaoui is a town and commune in Mbéré, Adamawa Region, Cameroon.

As of May 26, 2014, 4,722 refugees fleeing violence in the Central African Republic had crossed into Cameroon at Ngaoui.

The nearest refugee camps are Borgop and Ngam.

== See also ==
- Communes of Cameroon
