= Bocaranga =

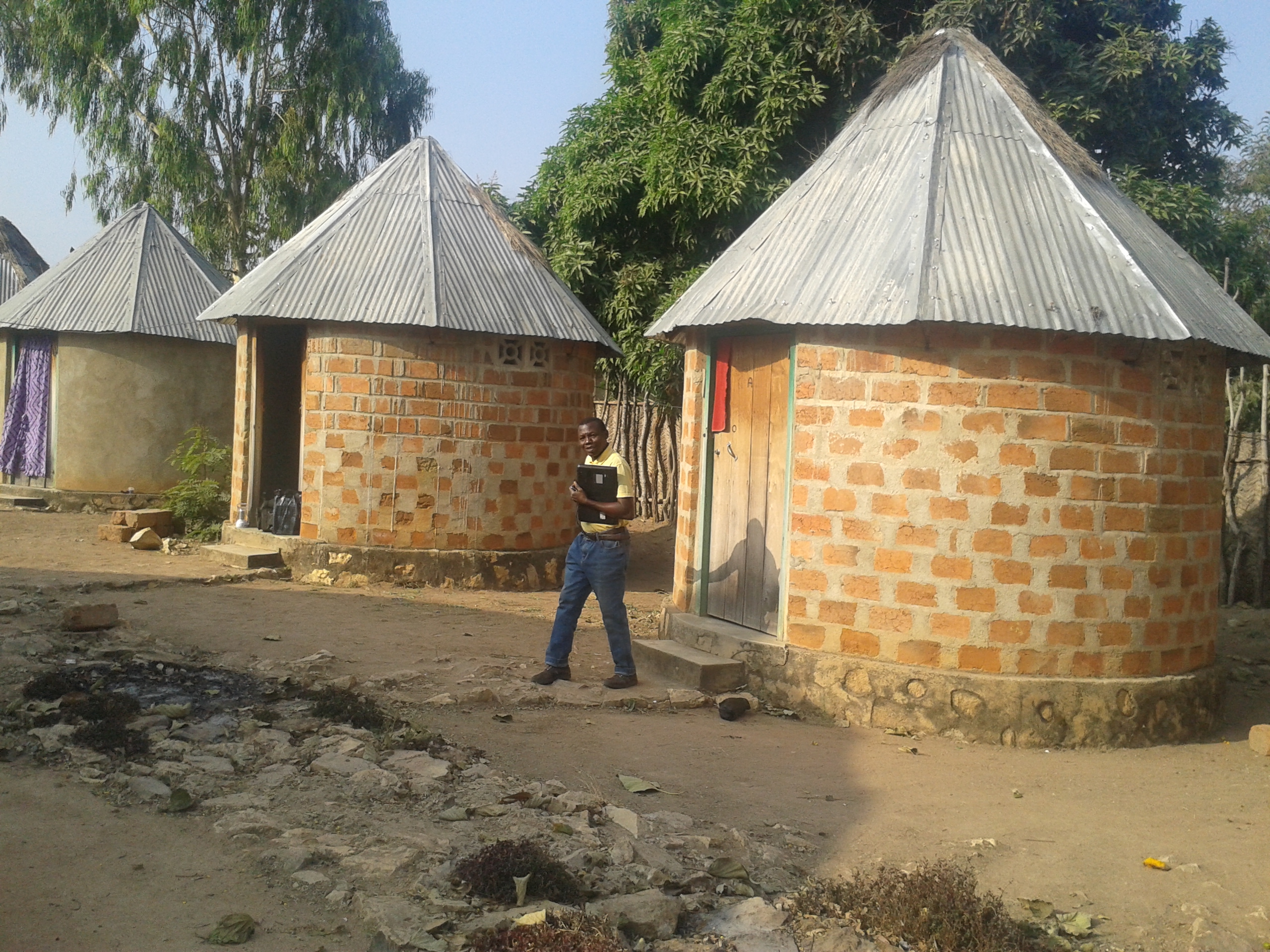

- Location within Central African Republic
- Coordinates: 6°59′3.95″N 15°38′26.99″E
- Country: Central African Republic
- Prefecture: Ouham-Pendé

Government
  - Sub-Prefect: Crépin Bonaventure Kassamou Kongovoulou
  - Mayor: Aimé Césaire Kodomon
- Elevation: 1,072 m (3,517 ft)

Population (2003)
  - Total: 61,190

Bocaranga is a sub-prefecture in the prefecture of Ouham-Pendé in the Central African Republic. The city must not be confused with Bocaranga I, Bocaranga II, Bocaranga III and Bocaranga IV. These are smaller villages along the road from Bocaranga to Bouar.

== History ==
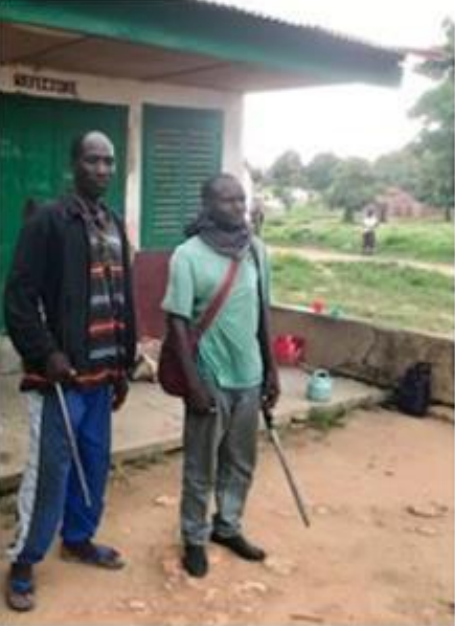
Anti-balalaka fighters occupying school in Bocaranga, May 2017

The village of Bocaranga was ceded to German Kamerun on 4 November 1911. It went back to French Oubangi-Chari rule in 1914. In 1946 it became a district and on January 23, 1961 it became a sous-préfecture within the newly independent Central African Republic.

=== Civil war ===
On 23 September 2017 Bocaranga was captured by 3R rebels from Anti-balaka. It was recaptured by government forces on 7 January 2019.

== Geography and climate ==
The city is located in the highlands of the northwest part of the country. It is surrounded by granite hills and rocks. Northwest of the city is Mount Bocaranga (1309 m), which is one of the highest points in the country.

Köppen-Geiger climate classification system classifies its climate as tropical wet and dry (Aw).

Climate data for Bocaranga
Month	Jan	Feb	Mar	Apr	May	Jun	Jul	Aug	Sep	Oct	Nov	Dec	Year
Mean daily maximum °C (°F)	30.4 (86.7)	32.2 (90.0)	32 (90)	30.3 (86.5)	28.9 (84.0)	27.2 (81.0)	26 (79)	25.9 (78.6)	26.5 (79.7)	28 (82)	30.2 (86.4)	30.8 (87.4)	29.0 (84.3)
Daily mean °C (°F)	22.4 (72.3)	24.2 (75.6)	25.3 (77.5)	24.6 (76.3)	23.7 (74.7)	22.4 (72.3)	21.7 (71.1)	21.6 (70.9)	21.7 (71.1)	22.4 (72.3)	22.8 (73.0)	22.5 (72.5)	22.9 (73.3)
Mean daily minimum °C (°F)	14.4 (57.9)	16.2 (61.2)	18.6 (65.5)	19 (66)	18.5 (65.3)	17.7 (63.9)	17.5 (63.5)	17.3 (63.1)	17 (63)	16.9 (62.4)	15.5 (59.9)	14.2 (57.6)	16.9 (62.4)
Average precipitation mm (inches)	1 (0.0)	5 (0.2)	32 (1.3)	85 (3.3)	134 (5.3)	172 (6.8)	257 (10.1)	295 (11.6)	246 (9.7)	139 (5.5)	14 (0.6)	1 (0.0)	1,381 (54.4)
Source: Climate-Data.org, altitude: 1067m

== Transport ==
There is an airstrip outside town, Bocaranga Airport. The roads leading to Bocaranga are unpaved.
