= Ouham-Pendé =

Prefecture of the Central African Republic

Coordinates: 7°00′N 16°00′E

- Prefecture
- Ouham-Pendé in the Central African Republic

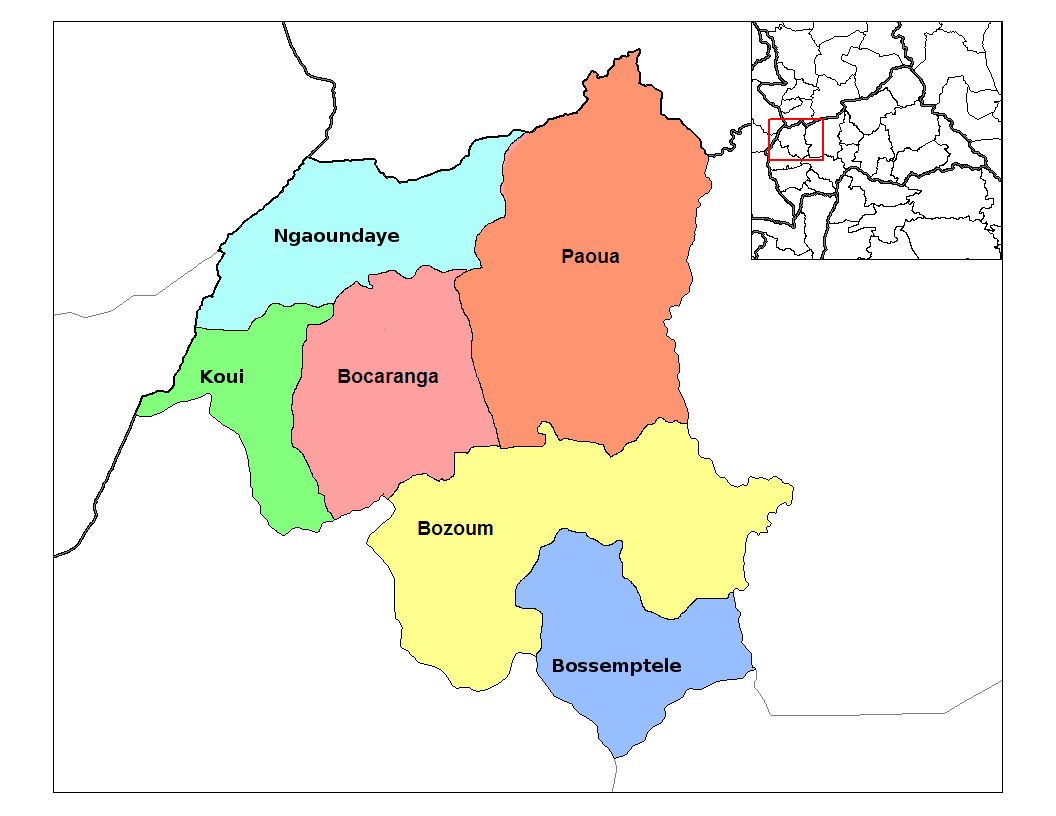
- Subprefectures of Ouham-Pendé before Dec. 2020
- Country: Central African Republic
- Capital: Bozoum

Government
  - Prefect: Geneviève Chour Gbadin

Area
  - Total: 18,520 km^{2} (7,150 sq mi)

Population (2003 census)
  - Total: 430,506
  - Estimate (2024 estimation): 254,649

Ouham-Pendé is one of the 20 prefectures of the Central African Republic. Its capital is Bozoum.

The prefecture covers an area of 18,520 km² and, according to official estimates, its population was 254,649 inhabitants in 2024. At the time of the country's last official census, in 2003, the population was 430,506 inhabitants in an area of 32,100 km². These are data from before December 2020, when part of the territory was dismembered to create the Lim-Pendé prefecture.

In the north it has a border with Cameroon and Chad. In the south is the prefecture Ombella-Mpoko, in the south-west the prefecture Nana-Mambéré and in the east the prefecture Ouham.

The region has contained several ghost towns such as Goroumo due to government forces ransacking them and armed bandits killing all the male inhabitants over the years from 2005 to 2008.

== Sub-prefectures ==
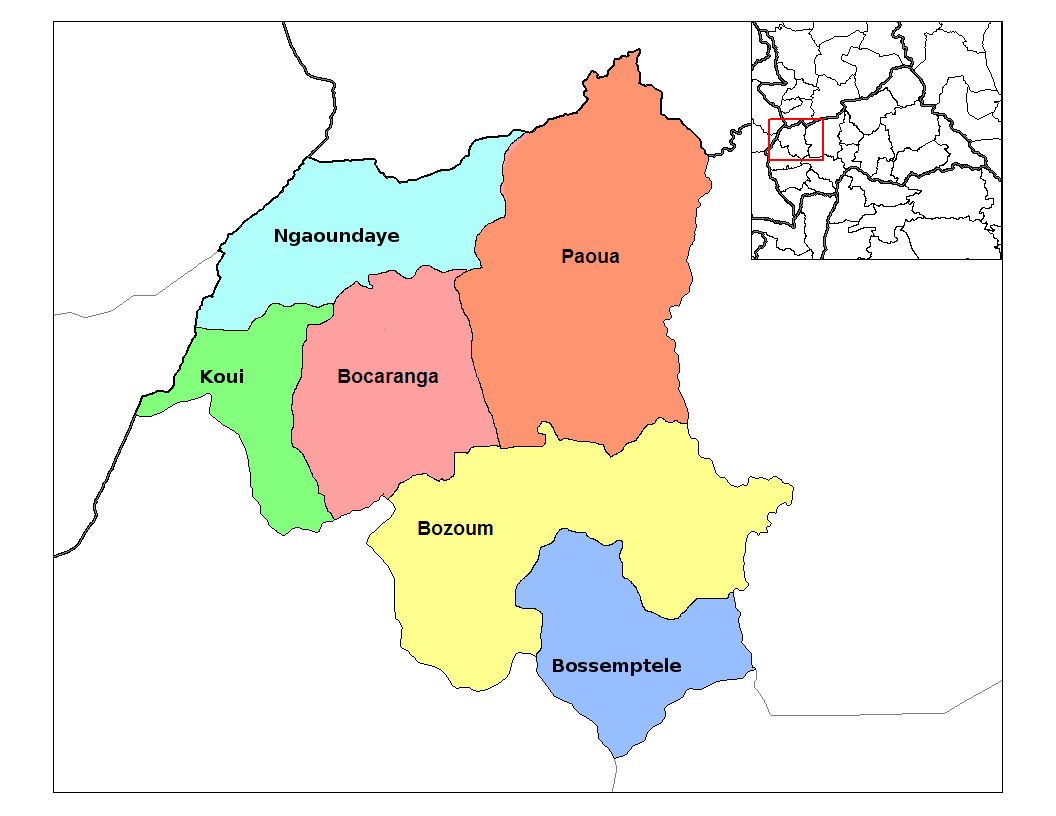
Sub-prefectures of Ouham-Pende

- Bocaranga
- Bozoum
- Bossemptele
- Koui
