= Dir, Cameroon =

Dir
- Commune and town
- Location in Cameroon
- Coordinates: 6.329°N 13.538°E
- Country: Cameroon
- Region: Adamawa Region
- Time zone: UTC+1 (WAT)

Dir is a town and commune in Cameroon.

== See also ==
- Communes of Cameroon
