= Meiganga =

- Location in Cameroon
- Coordinates: 6°31′48″N 14°22′12″E
- Country: Cameroon
- Region: Adamawa
- Department: Mbéré
- Elevation: 978 m (3,209 ft)

Population (2012)
  - Total: 41,314

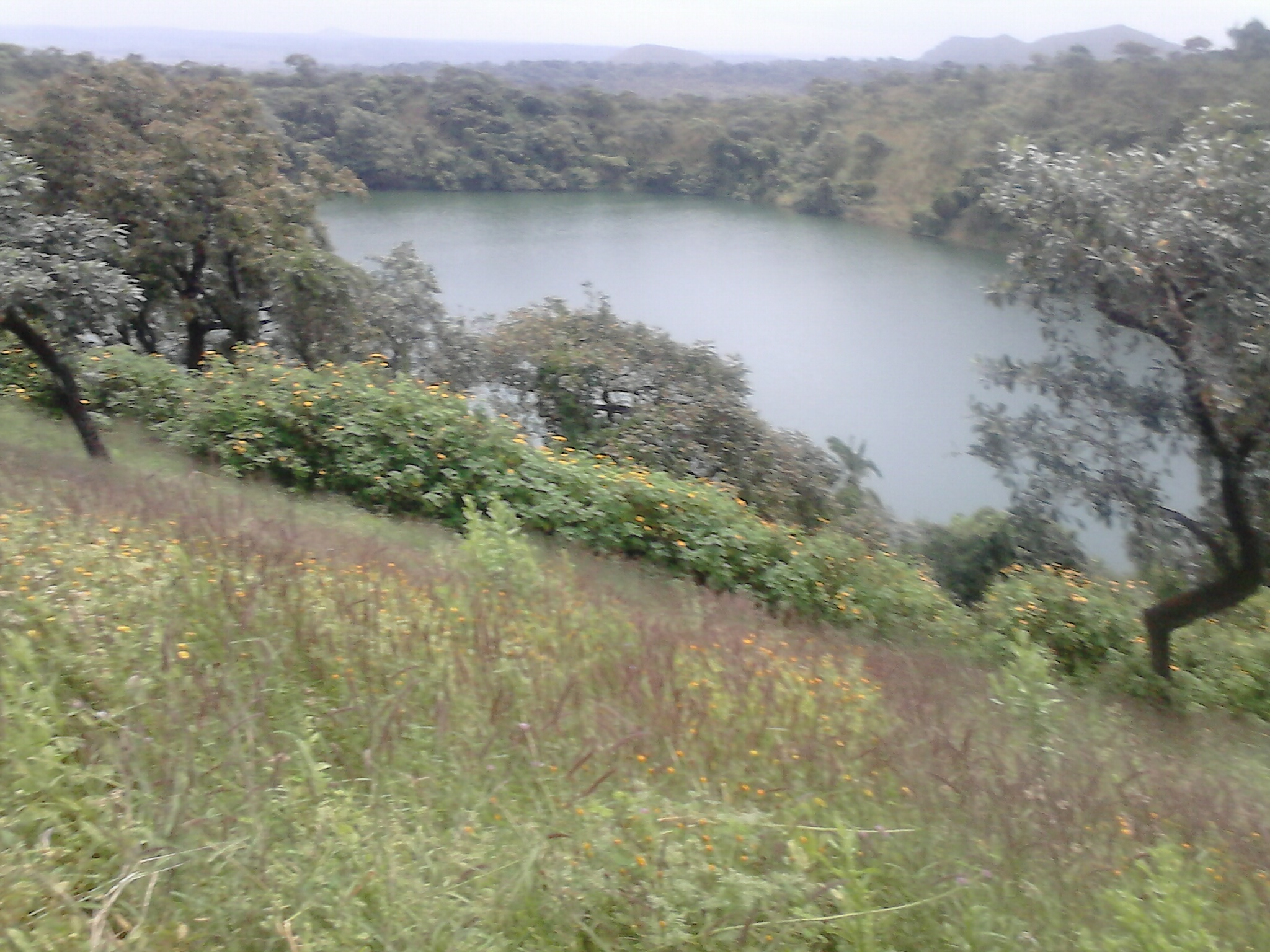
Lake Tison

Meiganga (Fula: Meiganga 𞤥𞤫𞤭𞤺𞤢𞤲𞤺𞤢) is a town in the Adamawa Region of Cameroon. It is located at around 6.53°N 14.37°E. Its estimated population in 2012 is 41,314.
