= Gbaya people =

Ethnic group native to Africa

Gbaya
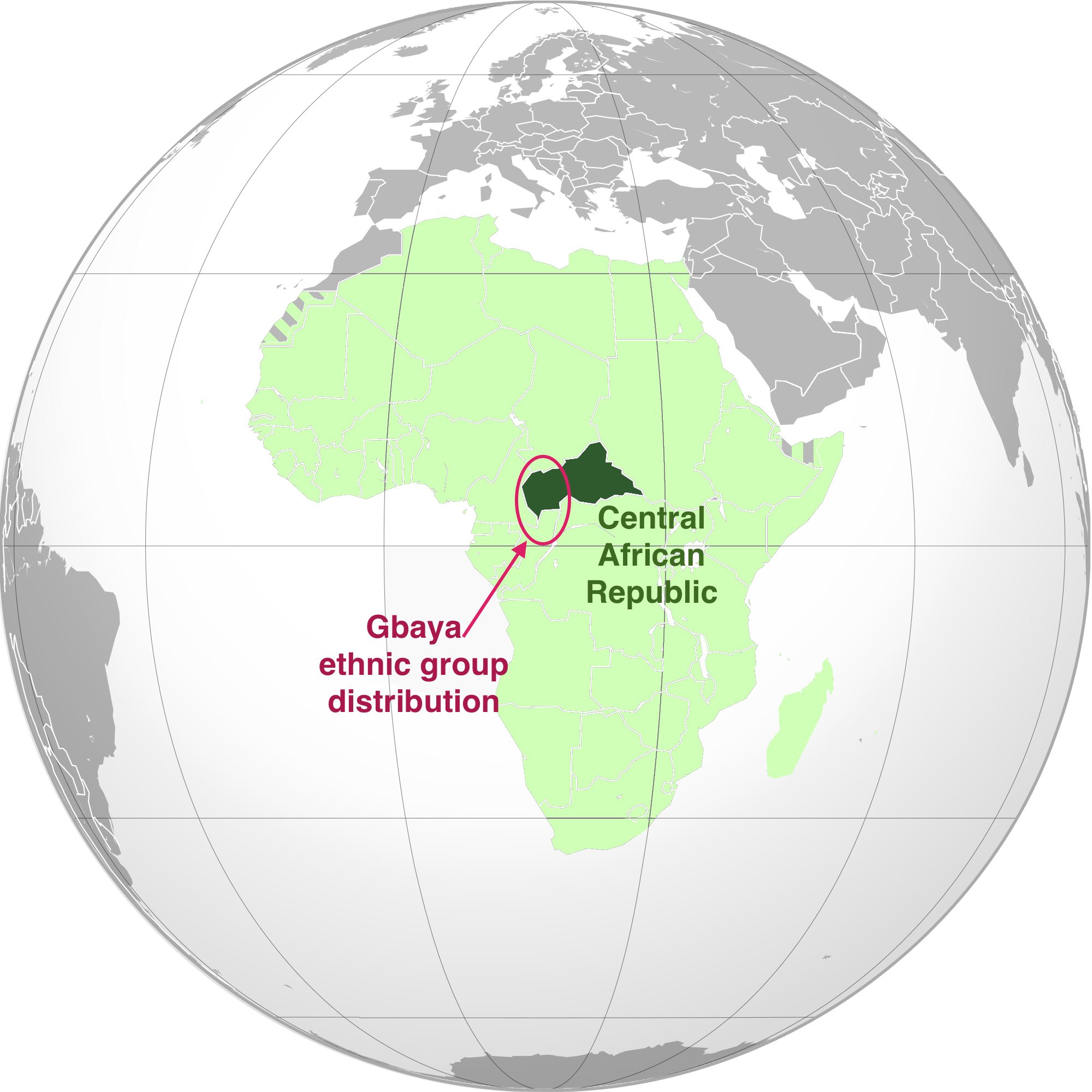
- Gbaya people distribution map (approx).

Total population
- 1.2 million

Languages
- Gbaya • French

Religion
- Christianity

The Gbaya, also Gbeya or Baya, are a people of the western region of the Central African Republic, east-central Cameroon, the north of the Republic of Congo, the northwest of the Democratic Republic of Congo, and South Sudan. In the first half of the 20th century, the Gbaya were involved in several revolt attempts against German and then French colonial rule.

In rural areas, the Gbaya cultivate mainly maize, cassava, yams, peanuts, tobacco, coffee and rice, the latter two of which were introduced by the French. Today, many of the Gbaya people are Christians, though witchcraft is practiced, known as dua.

== History ==
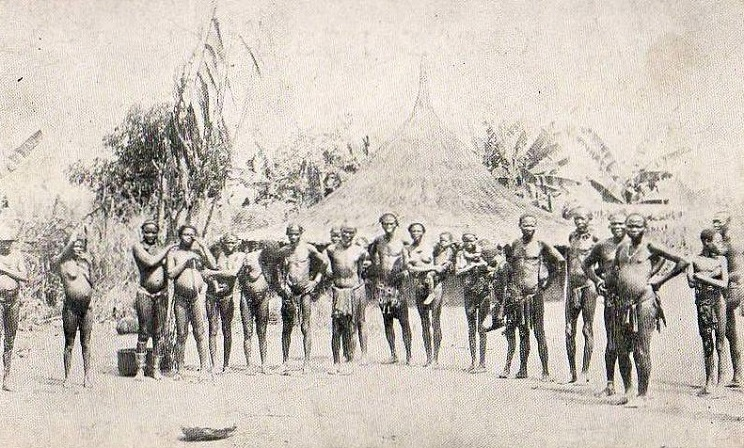
Gbaya village circa 1900.

Gbaya people have been present in Central Africa since at least the 16th century. Archaeological researches have determined their place of origin to be located somewhere in the lower valley of the Lobaye River. During the early 19th century, several Gbaya tribes migrated toward the Eastern area of whats is now Cameroon.

During the 19th century, a series of wars opposed Gbaya tribes to Fulani tribes of the Sokoto Caliphate. These wars were marked by extensive slave raiding, resulting in the enslavement of a great numbers of Gbaya by the Fulani. Some Gbaya clans accepted Fulani hegemony, however others united under leaders such as Bafio to resist Fulani slave raids.

The first contact with Europeans occurred in 1892, when French explorer Antoine Mizon entered Gbaya territory after steaming up the Sangha River.

In the early 1900s, the area where the Gbaya lived became part of German Kamerun. The Gbaya, who traditionally lived in small rural communities, strongly resented the forced urbanization brought by the Germans. Many tribes initially responded by moving away to remote areas, but a German repression campaign soon forced them back into submission. By 1910, all the resisting tribes had been subdued, and their leaders had been hanged. From 1912 onward, many Gbaya tribes were forced to collect rubber for the Germans.

When the First World War broke out, France, Britain and Belgium invaded German Kamerun. Many Gbaya joined the French to get revenge from the oppression they had suffered at the hands of the Germans. As they retreated, German forces used scorched earth tactics, burning down many Gbaya villages The Gbaya also suffered greatly when a number of Congolese Force Publique troops went rogue and indulged in a series of rapes and murders on the locals. To escape the horrors of the war, many Gbaya tribes went to live deep into the rainforest, and soon the old practices that the German administration had attempted to quell, such as tribal wars, slavery and cannibalism, became popular again.

In 1928, forced labor conscription by the French to build the Congo-Ocean Railway, and the rise of Karnu, a Gbaya prophet who claimed to possess magical powers that could defeat the French, caused the Gbaya to revolt massively. Karnu was killed early, but the revolt kept raging for about three years until the French were finally able to put it down.

The Gbaya people felt discriminated against in the political sphere, even after independence from the French. It was only in the 1990s that a notable number of Gbaya leaders began to be admitted into higher administrative positions in government. More recent estimates of the population differ markedly, from 1.2 million, down to 685,100, of which 358,000 are native to Cameroon.

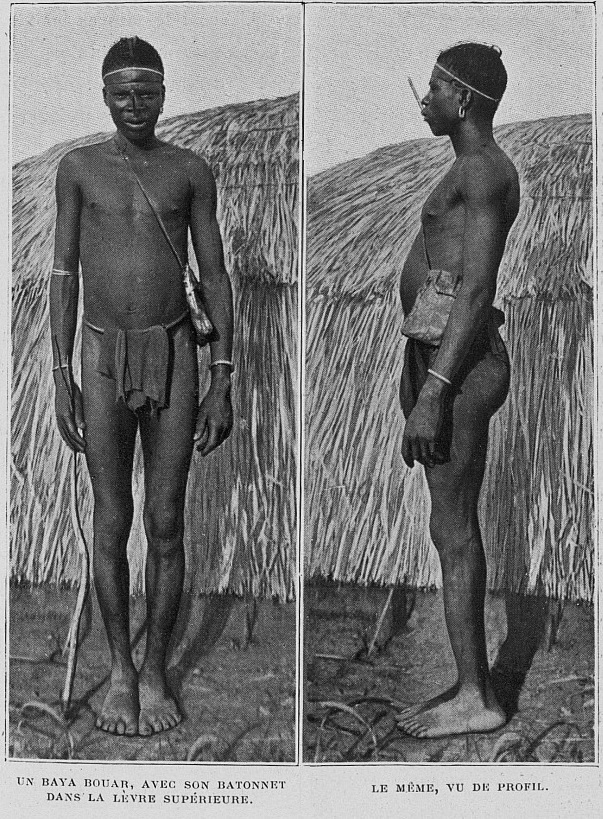
A Gbaya man in 1903

Gbaya culture often takes an interest in the past and various traditions of martial arts, including disciplines that use hand-to-hand weapons.

== Subgroups and languages ==
Subgroups of the Gbaya include the Bokoto, Kara, Kaka, Buli, and Bwaka. The Gbaya speak a language of the Adamawa-Ubangi subgroup of the Niger-Congo language family.

== Cannibalism ==
Pre-colonial and early colonial era Gbaya tribes routinely indulged in ritual anthropophagy. While it essentially targeted defeated enemies, it could in some occasions be extended to owned slaves. This behavior deeply disgusted the Germans and the French, causing them to disdain and mistreat the Gbaya people, and to favor other ethnicities (such as the Fulani) over the Gbaya.

By the end of the 20th century, anthropophagy is considered to have completely disappeared from Gbaya culture. One of the last recorded cases occurred in 1949, when a dozen old Gbaya men from a village near Bertoua were arrested after having indulged in ritual cannibalism.

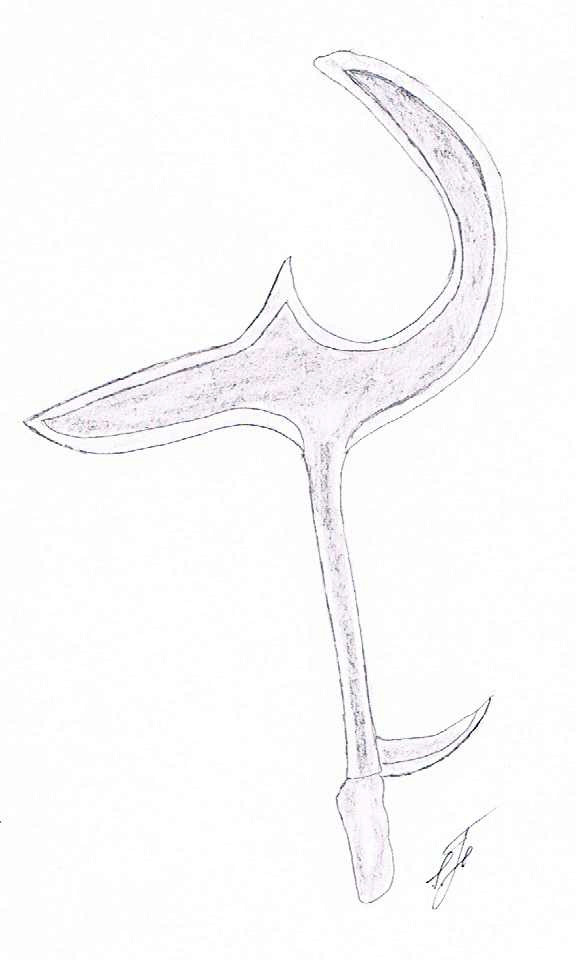
Gbaya throwing knife.

Former artisanal gold mining site in Garoua-Boulaï

Traditional Gbaya mortar and pestle in Garoua-Boulaï, Cameroon, used to pound cassava for cassava couscous (2026)

== Economic and cultural practices ==
In rural areas, the Gbaya cultivate mainly maize, cassava (staple food), yams, peanuts, tobacco, coffee and rice, the latter two of which were introduced by the French. The diamond industry took off in the late 1930s and still remains important. The agriculture method of Gbaya is called "swidden", a type of "slash and burn" farming where the forest is cleared, vegetation burnt on top of the cleared land, the farm used for a few years, then abandoned and the families move to a new area.

The Gbaya make an alcoholic beverage prepared with honey which is known as kuri. Kam, is a Gbaya porridge made from cassava. Today, most of the Gbaya people are Christians (50% Protestant, 33% Catholic), about 12% follows original indigenous beliefs, with only a minority of Muslims (3%). Witchcraft is known to be practiced, and is known to the people as dua.

Stories and rituals of the Gbaya people are a feature of everyday society. The rituals employ martial arts equipment such as dual-edged swords and throwing knives.

=== Material culture ===
In Gbaya culture, the mortar and pestle are central tools, widely used to pound cassava to prepare cassava couscous, the staple food of the Gbaya people.

== Famous People ==
- François Bozizé, 6th president of Central African Republic
- Alexandre Banza, Former minister of finance and state of Central African Republic
- Michel Gbezera-Bria, Former prime minister of the Central African Republic

== See also ==
- Gbaya languages
- To language
