= Mbéré =

- Department
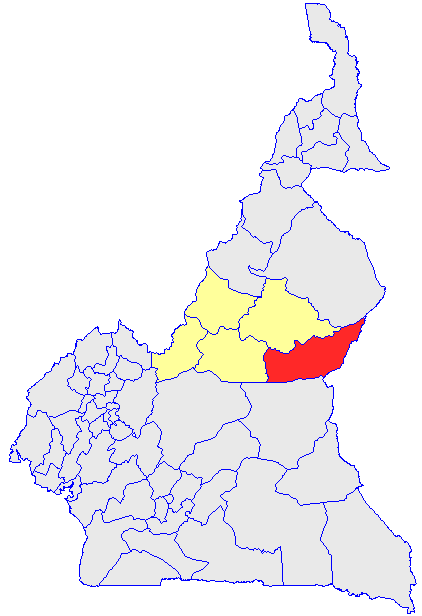
- Department location in Cameroon

- Location within Cameroon Location within Africa
- Coordinates: 6.4216°N 14.2930°E
- Country: Cameroon
- Province: Adamawa Province
- Capital: Meiganga

Area
  - Total: 14,267 km^{2} (5,509 sq mi)

Population (2001)
  - Total: 185,473
  - Density: 13.000/km^{2} (33.670/sq mi)
- Time zone: UTC+1 (WAT)

Mbéré is a department of Adamawa Province in Cameroon. The department covers an area of 14,267 km^{2} and as of 2001 had a total population of 185,473. The capital of the department lies at Meiganga.

== Subdivisions ==
The department is divided administratively into arrondissements and communes and in turn into villages.

- Dir
- Djohong
- Meiganga
- Ngaoui
