= List of villages in Adamawa State =

This is a list of villages and settlements in Adamawa State, Nigeria organised by local government area (LGA) and district/area (with postal codes also given).

== By postal code ==
LGA	District / Area	Postal code	Villages
Demsa	Bali	642109	Bali; Barinkin Jatau; Bomni; Bujin Kona; Dakkli; Dem; Donwa I; Donwa II; Guri; Kpankpai; Kpasham; Kwafara; Tamshi; Yagombali
Demsa	Bille	642110	Bajan Long; Bamaro; Bille; Dakusung; Dingle Dutse; Ga-Fulani; Gah belwa I; Gah Belwa II; Gansari; Gorin Kasuwa; Maizanshe; Mayo Bandaru; Ntorong; Pishi; Tere; Waka apare; Waka Tunga
Demsa	Borrong	642105	Bange; Borrong; Borrong Habe; Busso; Dili; Garan Loh; Gosho; Kunteri; Lassale; Linga; Loh; Mbumaa; Morro; Morro II; Ngongolang; Salabangha; Takka; Tikka Lafiya; Tunga; Uganda; Wuro Swangu
Demsa	Demsa	642103	Bwashi; Dakanta; Demsa New; Demsa Old; Dowaya; Dwam; Farai; Gani Gaku; Gindin Dutse; Gorogbake; Green Village; Gwassala; Hosere Bembal; Kadomum; Kawon; Kindam; Kokumto; Kudiri; Kunliro; Kwale; Kwayine; Lanyaling; Lupanga; Maliki; Mbukanga; Moya Nyalibi; Murgarang; Nzuramta; Pode; Sabon Gari; Wuro Laka; Wuro Yero; Zuran
Demsa	Dong	642108	Bolon; Fara Baraune; Gada Lawaru; Janawuri; Kedemure; Lawaru; Ngbekedewe; Unguwan Tukur
Demsa	Gwamba	642107	Billachi; Bungudo; Byelanga; Famtami; Gamba; Lassala; Mbamburu; Sabewa; Salara; Sondi; Tswaban; Wuro Munchi
Demsa	Mbula	642102	Bajifang; Bangun; Chafan; Garan-Mbula; Guguri; Kade; Kpakmyagi; Kulangilung; Kulasala; Labakuri; Mbula Kuli; Nzungwaling; Shime; Tahau; Tahau Gula; Tandakai; Tassala; Tsonbwang; Tsware; Uni-Lab
Fufore	Daware	640108	Babirwo; Bagale; Bngo; Daware; Digino Jubawo; Digino Ngarawo; Furo; Hamdallah'Holmawo'Kadang; Nyibire; Pariya Hqtrs D; Wuro-Yolde; Yaungo
Fufore	Gurin	640104	Bappawo; Beli Chiuti; Chigari; Chikito; Fema; Filingo; Gawi; Gurin Town; Hes-Beti; Jammare; Mbamga; Muninga; Pateri; Perda; Vamni; Wuro-Yolde
Fufore	Malabu	640103	Balachi Konchi; Bilachi Bwatiye; Chekeuro; Dasin Abba Kumbo; Farang; Goshidang; Kofa Gafade; Kofa-Lamurde; Litare; Magdari; Malabu; Mbilla Malabu; Mubako; Nassarawo; Teleuchi; Wuro-Bokki; Wuro-Kachalla; Wuro-Ujiri
Fufore	Mayo-Inne	640106	Boggare; Budiyang; Hegga Barudu; Hirungo; Kiri; Mayo Mbulo; Sirotore; Watango Hqtrs; Wuro-Sam
Fufore	Nyibango	640109	Bati; Jili; Koksupa; Mboi; Nyibango; Ugi; Wom-Jangi; Wuro Jauro; Yadim Kura DHQS
Fufore	Riba	640107	Chafajaule; Dasin Bwatiye; Dasin Hausa; Dulo Bwatiye; Dulo-Fulani; Farang-Farang; Fufore; Ribadu; Slomsi; Wuro-Mallum
Fufore	Verre	640105	Bai; Baraja; Beti Giware; Doaka Fulani; Gagdi; Guigwa; Gurati; Karlahi & DHQS; Tali; Toza
Ganye	Banarikiuso	642115	Bagana; Dabosino; Dagumal; Daingubi; Dajubin; Dakauro; Dakemdu; Daketi Keri; Dakpukum bambi; Dalanvau; Dalepkin; Dalkiname'Daluya; Damoka; Dapellum; Dataguba-Sani; Dimoso; Dinyabbi; Dmkusum; Ga Farang; Gang Yigen Gaiga; Gangaila; Ganglomen; Gangnuyika; Gangtimeni; Gangwoki; Garaja Garuwa; Gawakola; Gayemjangba; Goso; Jamisu; Juzengti; Kineni; Kokiwa; Kong lata; Lekwoshi; Manti; Nabantura; Nadeu; Najira; Nasiti; Naya; Nolomi'Nasa; Sandoka; Saugubi; Tiduti; Timkiti; Timpukki (Fulani); Timpukki (Sanda); Timpukki (Umaru); Timtubi; Timyemma; Wowokki; Yab van viti; Yapashi; Yemlaibu
Ganye	Ganye	641110	Tiri Gari; Bappare; Dadiri; Dadiri Gada; Gangdona; Gangene; Ganye; Jauro Siriki Sumaki; Kanasuwe; Mallam Hore; Peshi; Sabon Layi; Waja; Wuro Gadogi
Ganye	Gurum	642116	Dabo Bara; Dabtelum; Daguma; Dajabi Chamba; Dakobben; Dakom; Dakuma; Dakuna; Dakuna tiba; Dalam; Dalebi Fulani; Danubi; Dapeon Vahu; Darah; Dat Mibu Gari; Dattam Sama; Dauti; Dimkurma; Dimkurma Fulani; Gamgkobo; Gangdiyi; Gangkwah; Gatanen; Gudin; Gurum Pawo; Jangani gari; Jangpan; Jusan; Lingbi; Masah; Mayo bewa; Nasiti; Nayabbo; Nayah; Sabon; Sadon Chamba; Saman; Samarun; Sambem; Sammeti gari; Sangbang; Sangotim; Sanjetiti; Sanjetum; Santanen; Santarum; Sanzuseu Kiti; Saudon Fulani; Saukem; Sitim; Soppken; Tarum; Tiabuti; Timbenkum; Timbeurki; Timpoma; Timtubbi; Timyela; Wokji; Yola Chabbal
Ganye	Jaggu	642114	Angawab Mammuye; Bambe; Banshe; Bari Gajere; Bari Gare; Bibadu; Foka; Garamba; Ibadan; Jaggu; Jalingo; Jaudi; Jauro Bello; Jauro Idi; Jawo Fulani Bantahi; Jutingal; Kubaje; Leko; Mapiadi; Nabon; Nakomi; Nassarawo (Yspachi); Natubi; Nayiti Yelwa; Ngurote Jokate; Padimso; Peshi Yika; Sabon Layi; Sakule; Wadore (Jalingo); Wuro Baka
Ganye	Sugu	641111	Arnadodebbo; Batal (Chamba); Batal (Fulani); Biri (Wuro Hausa); Bwole; Da'age; Dabadu; Dabaku; Dabgerum; Dabulla; Daburma; Dadera; Dago; Daloo; Dampiya; Danjangla; Dapellum; Dataraa; Desigba'a; Deuti; Dissol; Faragba; Gamgaraso; Gamgbanen; Gamu; Ganglumgorori; Gangsanen; Gangteme; Gangtum Wuro; Gangwoni; Jagaba; Jamisu; Jijjiwa; Ju'kurum; Ju'sangum; Juduisa; Kamen; Kass (Mumuyawa); Komyegga; Kona Uku; Luggere; Mayo Kurdo; Nabeng; Naomi; Nawai; Naya; Naya Pu'ivan; Sabere; Sabere Karandang; Sabon Layi; Sahl Kano; Sakkamidari; Samaran; Sambari; Sanbum; Sandokka; Sankom; Sanyikkmi; Sugu; Tapare Gangtum; Tim Moni; Tim Yenuma; Timdesi; Timdokkami; Timkusum; Timpki; Timukum (Timpukum); Tit Yabumso; Tunga (Kumsaran); Wukari; Wuro Lemu; Wuromodibbo; Yalaki; Yandomenbu; Yem Kani bu; Yem'amalamu; Yemdakkamenb; Yemdimdo
Ganye	Timdore	641112	Abuja; Dabora; Daguni; Dasine; Dasksam; Dayiri; Dayiri (Fulani); Dimgbara; Gang Bannen; Gang Jonen; Gang Won; Gangbeu-en Munmmniye; Gangbuen; Gangkoen; Ganglaren; Gangminomi; Gayen imyema; Jauro Saga; Mallam Audi; Nagboko; Naya; Nongvan; Sabon Layi; Sakkuwa; Samari Ssebo; Sandasini; Sandoka; Sangubi; Sanjo Fulani; Sanjubi; Sankuran; Sankurum; Sanlala (Misan-Kut-ta); Sanyiri; Sausiri; Tasa; Timdore (Fulani); Timyenmia
Ganye	Yebbi	641113	Alhamisa; Balankaren; Basule; Burum; Buweti; Damema; Dasuku; Dawu; Degorde; Dinkokum; Gamgmen; Gang Duren; Gang Gamen; Gang Yaware; Gang Yeun; Gangbebbi; Gangbiren; Ganggoken; Gangjairi; Gangjomen; Gangjuken; Gangkero; Ganglari; Gangmuyal; Gangpokken; Gangsanen; Gangtari; Gangvan; Gbanni; Gbokkni; Gbukni; Gbunglung; Ginti; Jangpuli; Jarandi; Kaika; Kakusum; Karan; Kemkusum; Konage; Kotolo; Kubbi; Kurumji; Kusmji; Labari; Lamvan; Lisabi; Mago; Muranin; Nagana; Nalomi; Nashiri; Nawaru; Neksiri; Ngurore-Yebbi; Nwejjah; Nyagang; Nyemgpke; Sabon Layi Lungu; Sarkinyema; Semendeunivan; Sese; Seuchi; Shiga Daniyya; Talading; Timdingga; Timkori; Timyami
Girei	Gerie	652105	Damare; Daniyel; Gerei; Gereng; Jabbi Lamba; Jefan; Jera Bakari; Jera Bonyo; Labondo; Lainde; Mallam Machigu; Modire; Ruwo Amsani; Tambo; Wuro Dole
Gombi	Ga'Anda	652101	Kanesu'Kangohobe; Alhaji Buda; Bada; Banga; Baru; Boga; Boma; Dadware; Dangwara; Farma Anawa; Ferumara; Ga'anda; Gahumba; Galga; Gangrang; Ganjare; Gardama; Garfite; Hina; Jula; Kamsu; Karkwane; Kawunda; Kojoli; Koko; Kwanta; Njebjeba; Palara; Prakwanta; Shime; Ulfa; Umdur; Urshelima; Vurwara; Wambai; Zangara; Zangra; Zanra
Gombi	Garkida	652109	Babal Palsura; Bala Ungi; Balhona I; Balhona II; Bawa; Bebe; Bijibiji'; Blwhona; Dangula Bijibiji; Dangula Killba; Demna; Dongo; Dzangwala Tasha Yusuf; Futudan; Ganji; Gardama; Garkida; Gegeli; Gir; Girgithang; Guyaku; Hursada; Hurunda; Jau; Jouk on John; Kurara; Kwalamba; Kwari; Lubu; Mbewa; Merja; Ngina Kara; Ngurore; Parijo; Pirfa; Pirkasa; Raba; Shigane; Sosai; Tashan Yusufu; Tofa; Tsakesimta; Vurgwi; Wuyaku; Zthzurzu
Gombi	Guyaku	652108	Alaji Buda; Barma; Barmishu; Bokki; Dahai; Farmi Shi; Ferumara; Gada Mai Saje; Gardama; Garin Dadi; Gombi; Gulza; Gural; Jula Barni'Kanguru Gun; Kaudi Fulani; Kaula'; Kawunda; Kojoli; Kurara Alh. Maijo; Kwanan Kura; Kwarwa; Maraba Sangere; Marja; Mbilla; Mijiwana; Muchalla; Sabon Gari; Tawa; Turba; Walaw; Wmbai; Wugulsa; Wulbara; Wungara; Wuro Pappa
Gombi	Lala	652107	Alanra; Bafi; Bala; Bidel; Bidim; Dimaska; Dingai; Dini Fulani; Dkungama; Dungal; Duwa; Fotta; Gabun; Ganjing; Hursama; Hursea; Jebral; Jebre; Joroboi; Kandesum; Kanjita; Kilake; Kilar; Kiro; Kwada; Kwanta Korra; Kwaran Gwashe; Melbasi; Ngalga; Riji; Sabon Gari; Sama; Shanapa; Shime; Sokra; Talire; Tangda; Tawasu; Tunu; Unguwan Nene; Wamdituru; Wammirote; Wojoli; Yamthiar; Yang; Zugru
Guyuk	Banjiram	643110	Banjiram; Gugu; Gunda; Kwadadai; Lokoro; Sukelye
Guyuk	Bobini	643111	Arah/The; Bobini; Bodeno; Doma; Gorotoro; Mada; Wawi
Guyuk	Chikila	643107	Chikila; Dangir; Gwalura; Jiu; Sili
Guyuk	Dukul	643108	Falu; Gundenyi; Gwana; Kurnyi; Lamz; Lapandi; Walu
Guyuk	Dumna	643109	Boshikiri; Burthi; Dumna Dutse; Dumna Zerbu; Salbu; Zakawon
Guyuk	Guyuk	643101	Guyuk; Jagira; Lakumna; Purakayo; Udun Guyuk
Guyuk	Kola	643112	Kerau; Kola; Pondiwe; Theble
Hong	Daktsi	650111	Buzza; Dagza; Dulchidama; Dzumah; Fachi; Gudumiya; Mbu Inyi; Midillah; Mothol; Ngalbi; Pella; Pella Gwaja; Tasha hindenga; Uding; Wuro Bokki; Zhedinyi
Hong	Dugwamba	650109	Dabna; Daku; Dazal; Garaha; Garaha Dutse; Kinging; Kuddah; Kwaprey; Lar; Mbanga; Mugwalar; Shashau; Washim; Zah
Hong	Gaya	650107	Chika; Faah Gaya; Gay Gartsanu; Gaya Thlang; Jabba Gaya; Kura Gay; Mubula; Sikaluri
Hong	Hong	650107	Fadama Reke; Hong; Mutuku
Hong	Kuliyi	650108	Bangshika; Dulmava; Dulwachira; Dzegayerima; Garavi; Gashaka; Jabba; Jalingo; Kala'a; Kubtava; Kwakwa'ah; Kwambula; Kwatau; Lugga; Makera; Maki; Mbalwaha; Mbulagyeng; Mijili; Mombol; Mung; Shiwa
Hong	Uba	650110	Dzakwa; Gashala; Hildi'Husara; Kwarhi; Migzil; Mukuving; Njerri; Uba
Jada	Danaba	641127	Danaba; Nadeu; Naguma
Jada	Jada	641107	Dagula; Jada; Jamtari; John Holt; Pakorgel; Sarkin Yamma
Jada	Koma	641109	Choncha; Deggi; Konglo; Ngolomba; Samlo; Tantile; Tuli
Jada	Leko	641108	Dalami; Kubi; Mayo-Hako; So'o; So'o Yelli
Jada	Mapeo	641126	Jalingo; Lengdo; Mapeo Gari; Mayo-Bewa
Jada	Mayo-Kalaye	641124	Gangnai; Kilbawo; Mayo-Kalaye; Nassarawo; Wuro Abbo
Jada	Mbulo	641123	Farang Van; Mangla; Mbngan Tiren; Mbulo Gari; Mbulo Kombuwal; Pola
Jada	Nyibango	641122	Banche; Dashen; Nyibango
Jada	Yelli	641125	Balauru; Gaadjo; Kojoli; Koma; Mayo-Ine; Namberu; Sapeo
Lamurde	Gyawana	642114	Bafio; Dauto; Dubwagun; Goh; Gyawana; Hoki; Kowei; Labawa; Lugere; Mbemum; Ngbakowo; Ngodogoron; Opalo; Overseer; Pude; Sabannah; Shemun; Tingno Kogi; Zekun
Lamurde	Kwah	642116	Balaifi; Bandawa; Bolere; Botoni II; Bunari; Dullum; Dutsen Maka; Gurben Baure; Gyakan; Kauya; Kwah; Ruwan Zafi; Song; Tsayawa
Lamurde	Lafiya	642113	Kupte; Lafiya; Mamsirme; Mere; Ngbebonge; Sabonlayi; Tudun Wada; Turakra
Lamurde	Lamurde	642104	Bajen; Gangare Tito; Gongong Rigange; Hadiyo; Kauya; Lamurde; Mwana Mango; Mwana Tari; Mwana Wongo Estate; Nasarawo; Ngbamoto; Rigange; Sabon Gari; Toto
Lamurde	Suwa	642117	Badim; Bashaka; Bulkutu; Galu; Gunduli; Kizza; Kwaa; Kwana; Lassin; Luwafute; Mala; Sulne; Suwa; Tiso; Tsayawa I; Wankan; Wodipwa
Lamurde	Waduku	642115	Anguwan Kuka; Anguwan Waja; Botoni; Kutu; Mallah; Tingno Dutse; Waduku; Wame II; Zuggo
Madagali	Duhu	651111	Duhu; Dzuel; Giwa Bula; Kojiti; Kuburshuwa; Kuda; Kwakwaghu; Kwalbadi; Kwambula; Lumadu; Mayowandu; Njahili; Pallam; Shuwa; Thalwancina; Tsitil; Wurogas; Zhau
Madagali	Gulak	651113	Bakin Dutse; Bitiku; Dar; Gadadamayo; Gadadamayo uda; Ghantsa; Ghumbili; Guak; Gwaram; Hashi; Hyambula I; Hyambula II; Iirsa; Jalingo; Kafin Hausa; Kaya; Kubu; Kuda Wazu; Kwamda; Lamore; Makwan; Pambul; Tsidla; Wanuki; Yinagu
Madagali	Kirchinga	651110	Dagali; Gadamayo; Kirchinga; Kopa; Kwammnu; Maigana; Maradi; Shuwari; Wurongayandi
Madagali	Madagali	651102	Bebel; Chakawa; Ghunilse; Gilma; Sukur Daurawa; Sukur Settlement; Turtakiva; Viengo; Visik; Visik Mattakam; Wagga; Yebango
Madagali	Sukur	651112	Damai Kasa; Damai Sama; Giwa Higgi; Gubla; Jelang; Kurang; Mafer; Magar; Mildo Shalmi; Mildo Vapura; Muduvu; Ndalmi; Rugudum; Sukur; Wakara; Wula Mango
Maiha	Belel	650106	Alamisa; Belel; Bodeje; Boloko; Bungel; Jamtari; Kasagila; Kirdagirma; Kiringabu; Konkol Bappare; Mayoteyel; Pete; Tirsi; Wuro Kurori
Maiha	Maiga	650104	Bwade; Cede; Dafra; Hubari; Hudu; Jalingo Buih; Kesure; Kilanye; Kubaje; Kuna; Kwa'aboon; Lande; Lugdera; Lunde; Maiha; Manjikir; Nguli; Paraiyel; Salma; Sikmavi; Wuro Kau
Maiha	Mbila	650115	Boken; Dude; Ejunturi; Furiemo; Kasagila; Lefen; Lugga; Lugga Ahamadu; Maiha Gari; Majaula; Mbegechi; Nassarawo; Tambajam; Wuro Alaji; Wuro Deeh; Wuro Iya
Maiha	Pakka-Vokuna	650114	Bashem; Fulberi; Furamane; Humbutudi; Kilangi; Kuna; Maner; Mbalagi; Pakka; Pegin; Tongo; Vokuna; Wuro Dafter
Maiha	Sarau	650105	Bafere; Dagchere; Holma; Jababa; Jalingo Mbamba; Jamtari; Jilang; Kolwa; Kungoli; Kwagol; Laide; Massagala; Mayo Vamde; Njanyi; Njilang; Sarau; Walewal Manga; Watango Jamtari; Wuro Ahmadu; Wuro Badde; Wuro Gende; Wuro Mallam
Mayo Belwa	Bajama	642121	Alkali Manga; Bajama; Bum Bum; Bunyayi; Chukkol Fulani; Dapanti; Gorobi; Mayo Danbe; Nassarawo Jereng; Ubaka; Wakka; Yelwa
Mayo Belwa	Binyeri	641103	Binyeri; Gambe; Gang Fada; Ganglushi Bamfo; Gangsubeni; Gangtagani; Mbanga; Mbullo; Mokki; Pola Kanoki; Tola; Tola Jabu
Mayo Belwa	Mayo Belwa	641101	Binkola; Chukkol; Garu; Gengle; Kauram; Mbilla; Ndikong; Ribadu; Sindigawa; Tugga; Wappa; Yoffo; Yolde Gubdo
Mayo Belwa	Mayo Farang	641102	Gijaro; Labara; Liringo; Mayo Farang; Mbalgara; Sate Jauro Mbilla; Wuro Bantare
Mayo Belwa	Mayo Lamja	642120	Bambe; Bura Manga; Ganglamja; Lamja; Mayo Lamja; Munchi; Zabi
Michika	Bazza	651103	Bazza Margi; Dilichime; Jigalambu; Kudzum; Tsukumu; Tuden Wada; VIH; Watsila
Michika	Futu	651106	Futudu; Futuless; Himike; Vu-Kaghe
Michika	Garta	651105	Diwa; Garta; Garta Kasa; Ghevi; Glumchi; Hule; Kemale; Mwagwa; Nkala; Pee; Sima Gali; Sima Mallo; Simakwande
Michika	Madzi	657108	Bedi; Gra; Kasuwa Naira; Kelen Kela; Kubi; Kuda; Kura Tsandza; Madzi; Madzi II; Muzuku; Tilli; Wambilumi; Warakandza; Watu II; Yamue
Michika	Michika	657101	Anguwan Layi Lassa; Bokka; Bulabili; Dzuroke; Jang; Kambadea; Kwabapale; Kwalia; Layi Lughu; Likune; Michika; Mutse; Rafin Samyi; Sangari I; Villegwa; Vu-Zhehyi
Michika	Nkafa	651109	Dlaka; Dzali; Gilhenki; Hudzukwi; Kwatsabe; Lidle; Mboruro; Mbradzewi; Minkisi; Moda; Mukaracitta; Mumi; Murva; Nkafa Mnalamai; Pambulo; Patha; Wuro Gayandi; Wuro Ngiki
Michika	Nkafa	651107	Ghenjawa; Waya Ndawa; Wula; Wurarike
Michika	Zah	651104	Sufuku; Thukudou; Zah; Zah Megha
Mubi North	Bahuli	650113	Bakaya; Bantahi; Duga; Gada Mayo; Ginnziha; Gudumiya; Guri; Gurmanjara; Gurunshida; Maduguva; Mbiduwa; Nduku; Tsamu Tela; Tsemo; Wafango
Mubi North	Mayo Bani	650102	Betso; Betso Manga; Cha; Dadgala; Didif; Hosere Tumbal; Jerengol; Kelluje; Kotirde; Kwa; Manzil; Muva; Suzuwa; Tapare
Mubi North	Mobu (Ruru)	650101	Barama; Dazala; Diagil; Kwaba; Kwachifa; Wuro Barka; Wuro Gendeji; Wuro Harde; Yaza
Mubi North	Muchalla	650112	Baagira; Chabul; Duda; Gyumbula; Kamnda; Kapoli; Kiriya; Koma; Kwaskine; Maskoka; Mbamba; Mitira; Miza; Mujilu; Mukta; Muvudi; Muvur; Pawi; Ribawa; Vimtim; Wudivi
Mubi South	Gella	650211	Chaba; Dirbishi; Duvu; Gandira; Girburum; Gude; Kwaja; Lamorde; Mujara; Mugulbu; Nassarawo; Nduku; Sahuda; Yadaba
Numan	Bare	642112	Bare; Batache; Daso; Daso Fulani; Fare; Jere; Koh; Luram; Morro; Ngella; Ngendan; Nuguwun Soja; Nyol 'Usulu; Sabon - Pegi - Bare; Takoh; Tamara; Tamu; Uban Doma
Numan	Numan	642101	Dorawa I; Dorawa II; Hayin Gaba; Imburu; Kikan; Kodomti; Kwapuke; Ngbalang; Nzoruwe; Pullum; S/Pegi Ngbarang; Shafforon; Zambun; Zangun
Numan	Vulpi	642111	Bandawa Daudu; Bang; Bang Kala; Bokotei; Bolki- Gon; Bulkm; Bwei; Byemti; Gamadio; Garin Gomro; Gemun; Kanti; Kwnan Bujem; Lawe Salti; Monaga; Nega; Ngawalti; Ngbalapun; Nzumoso; Sabon Layi; Salti; Tegbele; Tungan - Besa; Tungan - Ladan; Vulpi; Wodi Kakai; Yanga
Shelleng	Bakta	643104	Bakta; Birwit; Dakkiti; Golla; Gwadinge; Gwagarap; Jabbi Makki; Jakinda; Jonkolo; Kondoronhe; Kula Duse; Lagonsho; Laidedama; Lanuwa; Lipiro; Pupa; Sabon Pegi; Sembuluri; Waoje; Welmet; Wuroladde
Shelleng	Bodwai	643106	Bandah; Biki; Bodwai; Bolama; Deben; Dolla; Goroshi; Gorum; Gusungu; Gwakta; Gwapopolok; Homra; Iwiriwi; Jalingo; Jimbo; Karlaje; Komadi; Kongma; Leda; Nafada; Pella; Ruhum; Shebta; Surara; Tangah
Shelleng	Kiri	643105	Bare Fulani; Bayen Dutse Gundo; Bobere; Bubari; Dabewo; Gargajo; Garin Baba Dija; Gundo; Jalingo; Jauro Boderi; Kem; Kiri; Kogindole; Kurungu; Lababiri; Labau; Lajang; Nasarawo; Rimi; Sabon Pegi Washakara; Talum; Wuro-Gelaide
Shelleng	Libbo Dutse	643103	Dakiti; Dumburi Fulani; Gadajuga; Gargijik; Gimakurje; Jabi; Kambila; Katte; Kukumli; Labaram; Lakati; Libbo Dutse; Mittim; Shumshi; Vanera; Wadafa; Wurotuge; Wuroyanka; Zaunan-Bako
Shelleng	Shelleng	643102	Barata; Bira-Bira; Boburo; Bokayeki; Dabewo; Doge; Dunge; Gidan Koshi; Gombel; Gondong; Gukuri; Gwagira; Jamali; Jihadi; Jonkolo; Jumbul; Ketembere; Kula Kasa; Kula Ladeno; Labau; Lama; Monpdode; Shelleng; Tetek; Timbu; Wuroginnaji I; Wuroginnaji II; Yalo; Yelwa; Yorong
Song	Ditera	652104	Dirma; Dumne
Song	Mboi	652107	Gudu; Mboi
Song	Song	652102	Chukkol; Gben; Loko; Mbilla; Song
Song	Waltadi	652106	Waltadi
Song	Zumo	652103	Boloko; Holma; Karlahi; Kilange Hirna; Lappae; Zuno
Toungo	Dawo	641119	Adamu; Biniji; Dananji; Ganti; Jiman Buwanga; Jimon; Kagin Baba; M. Jaja; Nappi; Okalat; Songeli; Tapore; Taraba; Timbangor
Toungo	Gamu	641118	Babre; Badu; Biniji; C. Nadu; Mai Fula; Nayini; Simdagau; Sungwara; Tafida; Tapare; Timdoga
Toungo	Kini	641117	Adany Jim; Bauchi Gusa; Dichire; Galabiye; Kini Forest; M. Kom; Samkin Baka; Tim Koron
Toungo	Tungo	641106	Ardo Sambo; Arne Da Bako; Baba; Bavehi; Dameji; Galabje; Gamti; Gasa-Nappi; Gemda; J. Dewa; Kilta; Kubali; Kubore; Labore; Mao Habe; Mayo Dukein; Nuibago; Sabongai
Yola North	Jimeta	640211	Alkalawa; Ajiya; Bachure; Doubeli; Gerio; Gwadabawa; Jambutu; Karewa; Limawa; Luggere; Nassarawo; Njo'bare; Nyakkore; Rumde; Sebore Dougirei; Wuro Fulbe; Yelwa
Yola South	Namtara	640102	Changala; Goduwu; Gongoshi; Kulangu; Lagire; Namtari Gurel; Namtari Manga; Ngolamba; Ngorore; Wuro Yanka
Yola South	Yola (Rural)	640101	Bbamba; Bole; Maalkobhi; Njomboli Fulani; Njombvoli Fulan; Njoomboliyo; Rugange; Sebore; Yola-Town; Yolde Pate

== By electoral ward ==
Below is a list of polling units, including villages and schools, organised by electoral ward.

LGA	Ward	Polling Unit Name
Demsa	Bille	Bamoro I/ Central Pri. Sch.; Bamoro II/ Near Bamako Clinic; Daku Sung/ Dakusung Pri. Sch.; Gadamayo/ Ext. Pri. Sch.; Gah - Fulani/ Pri. Sch.; Gejembo/ Pri. Sch.; Gidan Killu/ Playing Ground; Kwafara I/ Tere Pri. Sch.; Kwafara II/ Playing Ground
Demsa	Borrong	Bange/ Bange Primary School; Kunteri/ Kunteri Pri. Sch.; Mbumara/ Playing Ground; Morro/ Morro Primary Sch.; Tikka/ Tikka Pri. Sch.; Ung. Ganji/ Near Cottage Hospital; Ung. Jenjo/ Playing Ground; Ung. Mbulawa/ Borrong II Pry. Sch.
Demsa	Demsa	Gani Gaku/ Pri. Sch.; Kodomun/ Pri. Sch.; Kudiri/ Kudiri Pri. Sch.; Kunliro/ Kunliro Pri. Sch.; Kwayine/ Kwayine Pri. Sch.; Murgarang/ Pri. Sch.; Sabon Demsa I/ Viewing Centre; Sabon Demsa II/ L. G. Pavillion; Tsohon Demsa/ N. A Office
Demsa	Dilli	Billachi/ Billachi Pri. Sch.; Bosso/ Bosso Pri. Sch.; Dwam Loh/ Football Ground; Lakati/ Playing Ground; Linga/ Ext. Pri. Sch.; Loh/ Loh Pri. Sch.; Mbungudo/ Open Space; Murgwaying/ Dilli Pri. Sch.
Demsa	Dong	Farabaraune/ Farabaraune Pry. Sch.; Janawuri/ Janawuri Pry. Sch.; Ngbekendewe/ Pry. Sch. Ground; Uro I/ Dong Pry. Sch.; Uro II/ Old Market Premises
Demsa	Dwam	Dwam Pare/ Playing Ground; Dwam Sakato/ Pry. Sch.; Kawon Dowaya/ Pry. Sch.; Kwale/ Kwale Pry. Sch.; Sabon Gari/ Pry. Sch.; Zuran/ Football Playing Ground
Demsa	Gwamba	Bunzal/ Open Space Near K/Jauro; Byalanga/ Byalanga Pry. Sch.; Gidan Mission I/ Gwamba Pry. Sch.; Lassala/ Lassala Pry. Sch.; Sanlara/ Playing Ground
Demsa	Kpasham	Bajiye I/ Kpasham Pry. Sch.; Bajiye II/ Market Premises; Bali Tanshi/ Open Space Near K/Jauro; Bali Yashi/ Viewing Centre; Bomni/ Bomni Pry. Sch.; Bujum Kona/ Pry. Sch.; Dakli/ Playing Ground; Kpankwai/ Playing Ground; Kwafara/ Pry. Sch.; Tagombali/ Pry. Sch.; Yadini/ Yadini Pry. Sch.
Demsa	Mbula Kuli	Bajifang/ Viewing Centre; Kade/ Ext. Pry. Sch.; Kpakmyagi/ Bagun Pry. Sch.; Kulassala/ Labakuri/ Ext. Pry. Sch.; Kuli I/ Central Mbula Pry. Sch.; Kuli II/ Mbula Market Premises; Mwarawo/ Pry. Sch.; Nzungwaling/ Playing Ground; Tahau/ Tahau Pry. Sch.; Tassala/ Tassala Market
Demsa	Nassarawo Demsa	Bolon/ Bolon Pry. Sch.; Gada Nume/ Pry. Sch.; Kedemure/ Pry. Sch.; Kokumto/ Pry. Sch.; Lawaru/ Pry. Sch.; N/ Demsa I/ N/Demsa Pry. Sch.; N/Demsa II/ Near Numan Hotel; N/Demsa III/ Near Viewing Centre
Fufore	Beti	Beti Wuro Mallum/ Beti Wuro Mallum Pry. Sch.; Chigari/ Chigari Pry. Sch.; Gawi/ Gawi Pry. Sch.; Baumshe Pry School; Ba Usumanu Pry Sch; Kofar Jauro Chigari; Kofar Jauro Doukerol; Kofar Jauro Garin Tsada; Beli Chiuti Pry Sch; Kofar Jauro Jalingo; Kofar Jauro Nyukka; Kofar Jauro Sawun; Kofar Jauro Shigalafiya; Gari Chekke (Kofar Jauro Wurochekke); Wuro Ardo/ Wuro Ardo Pry. Sch.; Zamfara Pry. Sch.
Fufore	Farang	Farang Pry. Sch.; Farang Pry Sch; Kofar Jauro Doukerol; Gdss Farang; Kofar Jauro Holmare; Kofar Jauro Hore Nyiwa; Kofar Jauro Jalingo; Kofar Jauro Kuro; Kofar Jauro Litare; Magaji Pry Sch; Kofar Jauro Malabu; Mubako Pry Sch; Damare Pry Sch; Sabon Gari Pry Sch; Kofar Jauro Tala; Kofar Jauro Wuro Bello; Kofar Jauro Wuro Heso; Kofar Jauro Wuro Jijiwa; Sabon Gari Pry. Sch
Fufore	Fufore	Central Pry. Sch. I; Central Pry. Sch. II; Central Pry. Sch. III; G. S. S. Fufore I; G. S. S. Fufore II; G. S. S. Fufore III; Kapo Pry. Sch.; Kofar Alh. B. Nai; Kofar Alh. Mu'Azu; L. G Secretariat; Kofar Jauro Hausari I; Kofar Jauro Hausari II; Kofar Jauro Wurokurori; Margire Pry. Sch. I; Margire Pry. Sch. II; Njanjanre Pry. School; Sabon Gari Pry. Sch.
Fufore	Gurin	Chikito Pry. Sch.; Filingo Pry. Sch.; Gurin Dispensary I; Gurin Dispensary II; Gurin G. S. S. I; Gurin G. S. S. II; Gurin Maternity; Gurin Tapare I; Gurin Tapare II; Gdss Gurin; Les Beti Pry Sch; Jubawo Pry Sch; Kofar Jauro Karewa; Kofar Jauro Karlahi; Kofar Jauro Maitari; Muninga Pry Sch I; Muninga Pry Sch II; Kofar Jauro Nassarawo; Central Pry Sch Gurin I; Central Pry Sch Gurin II; Kofar Jauro Zumore; Parda Dispensary; Wuro Yolde Pry. Sch.
Fufore	Karlahi	G. D. S. S. Karlahi; Area Court; Kofar Ardo Fulani; Kofar Jauro Bagauri; K. Jauro Beti Giware; K. Jauro Bossivani; K. Jauro Gagdi; K. Jauro Gogra; K. Jauro Kila Sakra; K. Jauro Lugga; K. Jauro Luggere; K. Jauro Paturu; K. Jauro Sabon Gari; K. Jauro Wamgo Garga; Kofar Jauro Wuro Jauro Yahya; Ngurore Pry. Sch; Toza Pry. Sch.
Fufore	Mayo Ine	Kabillo Dispensary; Area Court Mayo Ine; Area Court Mayoine; Kofar Jauro Garu; Kofar Jauro Guliyang; Kahjang Pry Sch; Kofar Jauro Kinikoi; Kiri Fulani Pry Sch.; Kofar Jauro Lainde; Kofar Jauro Mallare; Kofar Jauro Mayo Saganare; Kofar Jauro Mbilla; Kofar Jauro Nastirde; Ndingala Pry Sch.; Kofar Jauro Semti; Wuro Lamido Pry Sch; Kofar Jauro Wuro Viccho; Limi Pry Sch; Mayo Sirkah Pry Sch; Wuro Sham Pry School; Wuro Sham Sabon Pegi
Fufore	Pariya	Bagale Pry. Sch.; Bengo Pry. Sch.; Daware Pry Sch I; Daware Pry Sch II; Digino Ngarawo Pry. Sch.; Furo Pry. Sch.; Kadarbu Pry. Sch.; Digino Jubawo Pry Sch; Fuforeyel Pry Sch; Hamdalla Pry Sch; Kofar Jauro Hodango; Kofar Jauro Jambutu Bagale; Mbilla Holmawo Pry Sch; Mbodejam Pry Sch; Kofar Jauro M/ Bello; Kofar Jauro Nassarawo; Wuro Ahi Yaungo Pry Sch; Kofar Jauro Wuro Alaji; Wuro Yolde Pry Sch; Nassarawo Pry. Sch.; Pariya A Pry Sch; Pariya B Pry Sch; Pariya Gdss; Wuro Mou Pry Sch; Yaungo Pry. Sch.
Fufore	Ribadu	Chaufajaule Pry. Sch.; Dasin Bwatiye Pry. Sch.; Dulo Bwatiye Pry. Sch.; Kofar Jauro Baure I; Kofar Jauro Baure II; Kofar Jauro Bodere; Kofar Jauro Farang Farang; Kofar Jauro Kuka; Nafori Pry Sch; Dulo Fulani Pry Sch; Kofar Jauro Tumbinde; Kofar Waziri Ribadu; Near Bore Hole Dasin; Ribadu Pry. Sch.; Wuro Mallum Pry. Sch. Ribadu
Fufore	Uki Tuki	Cholli Pry. Sch.; Gurinati Pry. Sch.; Jili Pry. Sch.; Kofar Jauro Baiward; Kofar Jauro Bello Doos; Kofar Jauro Jammare; Kofar Jauro Jampa; Kofar Jauro Safatawa
Fufore	Wuro Bokki	Dasin Abba Kumbo Pry. Sch. I; Dasin Abba Kumbo Pry. Sch. II; Kamarsa Pry. Sch.; Bilachi Pry Sch; Gdss Malabu; Wuro Ujiri Pry Sch; Malabu Pry Sch; Malabu Dispensary; Kofar Jauro Jambutu; Mbilla Bilachi Pry Sch; Kofar Jauro Nadere; Kofar Jauro Suwawo; Wuro Hausa Pry Sch; Bilachi Dispensary; Kofar Jauro Wuro Marafa; Wuro Bokki Pry. Sch.
Fufore	Yadim	Bati Primary School; Kofar Jauro Kori Walol Kobi; Kofar Jauro Samboi; Kofar Jauro Sambi; Kofar Jauro Wom Bagga; Nyibango Primary School; Ugi Primary School; Womba Primary School; Womjangi Primary School; Yadim Primary School I; Yadim Primary School II
Ganye	Bakari Guso	Babidi/ Kj Babidi; Bakari Guso/ Kj Bakari Guso; Dimoso/ Kj Dimoso; Dirdiu D. Sabo/ D. Pry. Sch. I; Dirdiu D. Sabo/ D. Pry. Sch. II; Gangtimen/ Kj Hamm. Bori; Jatau/ Jatau Pry. Sch.; Jauro Buba Bello/ K. J. Buba; Konglata/ Kj Konglata; Sani Garga/ Kj S. Garga; Dangana Pry Sch II (Tekere Naya/Kj T. Naya)
Ganye	Gamu	Dissol Nalomi/ Dissol Pry. Sch.; Gamu Bariki/ Gamu Pry. Sch.; Gangtoma/ Tiyabumso Pry. Sch.; Kurum/ Kurum Pry. Sch.; Nalomi/ G. Maso/ Kj Nalomi; Sabere Karandang/ Sabere Pry. Sch.; Samberi/ Kj Samberi; Sankom/ Sankom Pry. Sch.
Ganye	Ganye I	Maiduguri/ Kj Maiduguri; Sabon Layi/ In Front Of Prison; Sabon Layi I/ Ganye I Pry. Sch.; Sabon Layi II/ Ganye I Pry. Sch.; Sabon Layi/ Ganye II Pry. Sch.; Old Market III; Old Market III(Unguwan Barade); Unguwan Barade/ K. Tela Konta; Unguwan Hausawa I/ Old Market; Oldmarket Ganye IV Pry Sch; Unguwan Hausawa/ K. Shehu Daka; Magistrate Court; Nipost Office; Waziri Abbo/ Ganye IV Pry. Sch.; Yalaki/ Gangwari Palace
Ganye	Ganye II	Min Of Works And Housing Ganye; New Motor Park Ganye; Dadiri/ Kj Dadiri; Jauro Hore/ Kj Hore; Luggere I/ Gra Pry. Sch.; Luggere II/ Gra Pry. Sch.; Luggere/ Gangaraso; Luggere/ Sub - Treasury; Luggere/ General Hospital; Nwanjumi/ Nwanjumi; Pessi/ Pessi Pry. Sch.; Sabon Layi/ S. Layi Pry. Sch.; Tappare/ Vtc Ganye; Trigali Dama/ Kj T. Dama; Wukari/ Kj Wukari
Ganye	Gurum	Bakari Adamu/ Gurumpawo Pry. Sch. I; Bakari Adamu/ Gurumpawo Pry. Sch. II; Dakuna Dakem/ Kj Dakem; Dakuna Tiba/ Kj Dakuna Tiba; Dalebi/ Dalebi Pry. Sch.; Jangeni/ Jangeni Pry. Sch.; Jauro Dabbo/ Kj Dabbo; Jusam/ Kj Jusam; Kiren Sando/ K. Sandon; Sammeri/ Sammeri Pry. Sch.; Sandon/ Kj Sandon; Sanguding/ Sanguding Pry. Sch.; Sankuma/ Kj Sankuma; Samman Gatanen/ Kj Saman; Sanlingbi/ Kj Sanlingbi; Santarum/ Kj Santarum; Sanvan/ Sanvan Pry. Sch.
Ganye	Jaggu	Balgare/ Balgare Pry. Sch.; Bari Gajere/ Bari Pry. Sch.; Dakola/ Kj Dokala; Jaggu Sabon Layi/ Jaggu Pry. Sch.; Jauro Idi/ Kj Idi; Ribadu Yelwa/ Kj Ribadu Yelwa; Wadore/ Kj Wadore
Ganye	Sangasumi	Kanisue/ Kj Kanisue; New Market; Sangassumi/ Kj Jimilla; Sangassumi/ Kj Kiba Ahmadu; Sangassumi/ Yelwa Rd. Junction; Sangassumi/ K. Yaro Kano; Sangassumi/ Vet. Office; Sangassumi/ Gangwari Sq.; Sangassumi/ S. Pry. Sch.; Santasa/ Kj Santasa
Ganye	Sugu	A. Debbo/ A. Debbo Pry. Sch.; Batal Chamba/ Kj Batal; Dagoo/ Kj Dagoo; Dampiya I & II/ Kj Dampiya; Gangbanen/ Gangbanen Pry. Sch.; Gangtum Tappare/ G. Tappare Pry. Sch.; Gangtum Tappare/ Kj Nawai; Gsss Sugu/ Govt. S. S. Sugu; Janganen Gbeurum/ J. Gbeurum Pry. Sch.; Jusangum/ Kj Jusangum; Jutingo/ Kj Jutingo; Mayo Kordo/ Kj Mayo Kordo; Sandoka/ Immigration Office; Sankolum Dagena/ Sankolum Pry. Sch.; Sugu Town Hall; Sugu Viewing Centre
Ganye	Timdore	Chamba Dayiri/ Dayiri Pry. Sch.; Dabora Dogo/ Kj Dabora; Dajan Daguni/ Dajan Pry. Sch.; Daksami/ Daksami Pry. Sch. I; Daksami/ Daksami Pry. Sch. II; Gangjonen/ Gangjonen Pry. Sch.; Gangminoni/ Kj Gangminomni I; Gangminoni/ Kj Gangminomni II; Gidan Kowa; Nangwan Pry Sch II; Nangwan Pry Sch I; Sabon Layi G. Laren/ S. Layi Pry. Sch.; Sandoka/ Sandoka Pry. Sch.; Sangub. S. Kuvan/ Kj Sangub; Sanjo Chamba/ Kj Sanjo Chamba; Sanjo Fulani/ Kj S. Fulani
Ganye	Yebbi	Basule/ Kj Basule; Dimbiweri Sani Nagana/ Dimbi Pry. Sch. I; Dimbiweri Sani Nagana/ Dimbi Pry. Sch. II; Ganjari Jarande/ Kj Jarande; Gangjubi Kavan Nya/ Ganjub Pry. Sch.; Ganjuken G. Lari/ Gang Juken; Gbanin/ Kj Gbanin; Janpuli/ Kj Janpuli; Kaika/ Bakin Tasha Kaika; Kofar Gangyaware/ Kj Kakusum; Kubi Lisabi/ Kj Lisabi; Labari/ Kj Labari; Ngurore Yebbi/ Ngurore Pry. Sch.; Tading Kakusum/ Kj Gangmen; Timko. Timya. Nya/ Timko Pry. Sch.
Girei	Dakri	Anguwan Labaran/ Kofar Jauro Moh; Bajabure Housing Estate/ Phase II Road 2; Dakri Alhaji/ Kofar Alh. Bakari; Kofar Jauro Bobbo/ Kofar Jauro Bobbo; Kofar Jauro Yahaya/ Kofar Jauro Yahaya; Labondo/ Kofar Jauro; University/ Near Girls Hostel
Girei	Damare	Badirisa/ Kofar Jauro Adamu; Bajabure/ Kofar Jauro Yuguda I; Bajabure/ Kofar Jauro Yuguda II; Damare/ Damare Pry. Sch.; Karamti/ Kofar Mai Anguwa Sani; Lainde D/Fulani/ Kofar Jauro Sani; Yelwa/ Kofar Jauro Ali
Girei	Gerei I	Ardo Maguwa/ Kofar Ardo; Holmare/ Kofar Jauro; Hottollore/ Kofar Jauro; Kofar Alhaji Abba; Kofar Dallatu; Kofar Lawwalu/ Near Girei Market; Kofar Ubandoma/ Palace Gate; Kofar Wakili Misa/ Kofar Wakili Yahaya; Kolere/ Kofar Jauro; Wakili Yuguda/ Battare
Girei	Girei II	Bapetel Kila/ Girei II Pry. Sch.; Kofar Buba Margi; Kofar Galadima; Kofar Maiturare; Kofar Sarkin Hausawa; Njarenga/ Kofar Jauro Njarenga; Sangere W/Madi/ Kofar Jauro
Girei	Gereng	Fawaire / Kofar Jauro Duniya; Gereng 'I' / Gereng 'I' Pry. Sch.; Gereng 'II' / Gereng 'II' Pry. Sch.; Jauro Dagiya / Dagiya Pry. Sch.; Kangling / Kangling Pry. Sch.; Kofar Arnado / Kofar Jonah; Kofar Jauro Jatau / Vudeitu - No -Ine; Kofar Jauro Kalifa / Gereng 'B' Pry. Sch.; Kofar Nasara Kwaha Lumo
Girei	Jera Bakari	Gudusu/ Kofar Iya; Kaptarare/ Kofar Jauro Shehu; Ruwo Amsami/ Kofar Chiroma; Ruwo Basambo/ Kofar Modibbo Sa'Adu; Ruwo Sani/ Kofar Kaigama; Somyel/ Kofar Ardo
Girei	Jera Bonyo	Abba Murke/ Kofar Jauro Dango; Ardo Hayatu/ Fattude Jauro; Daneyel/ Daneyel Pry. Sch.; Jera Bonyo Pry. Sch.; Jera Bonyo W/Mala/ Kofar Barade; Pasagida/ Kofar Ardo Bamanga; Sabon Gari Daneyel/ Kofar Jauro S/Gari
Girei	Modire/ Vinikilang	Jabbire/ Kofar Jauro Jabbire; Kofar Jauro Buba/ Borehole Jauro Buba; Kofar Waya I; Kofar Waya II; Modire/ Kofar Mai Jimilla; Njobbore/ Kofar Jauro Njobbore; Tudun Wada/ Kofar Jauro Tudun Wada; Vinikilang Borehole/ Vinikilang First Borehole; Vinikilang Pry. Sch./ Vinikilang Pry. Sch.
Girei	Tambo	Bakopi/ Bakopi Pry. Sch.; Bidimchi/ Bidimchi Pry. Sch.; Kpongno/ Kpongno Pry. Sch.; Luru/ Luru Pry. Sch.; Murposa/ Murposa Market; Puporo/ Kofar Jauro Tiki Tiki; Tambo Jimoh / Tambo Jimoh Pry. Sch.; Tambo Manga/ Tambo Pry. Sch.; Suyi/ Kofar Jauro Ethan
Girei	Wuro Dole	Anguwan Hausawa/ Kofar Alh. Inuwa; Basarki/ Kofar Basarki; Goneri/ Kofar Safe; Jabbi Lamba/ Kofar J/Jabbi Lamba; Jibiro/ Gada Walewol; Mallam Madugu/ Filin Awon Auduga; Nasarawo/ Kofar Modibbo Julde; Sangere Margi/ Kofar Jauro Margi; Wuro Dole/ Kofar Jauro Wuro Dole
Gombi	Boga/ Dingai	Boga/ Boga Primary School; Boga/ Kofar Jauro; Dingai/ D/Maska /Kofar Jauro; Dingai / Dingai Primary School; Hurtunda /Okafor Jauro; Dingai / Jebre Primary School; Dingai /Johita / Kofar Jauro; Kilar/ Dingai/ Kofar Jauro; Kwadumra/ Kofar Jauro; Kwargwashe Dingai/ Pry. Sch.; Sama Farticha - Kofar Jauro; Sirta / Dingai/ Kofar Jauro; Shime/ Boga Pry. Sch.; Zangra/ Boga Pry Sch
Gombi	Duwa	Dahra/ Kofar Jauro; Duwagari/ Pry. Sch.; Fotta/ Fotta Pry. Sch.; Fotta/ Fotta Clinic; Jaraboi/ Kofar Jauro; Jere/ Kofar Jauro; Kiro/ Kofar Jauro; Leme Fulani/ Kofar Jauro; Riji/ Pry. Sch.
Gombi	Ga'Anda	Dadwari/ Pry. Sch.; Gangrang Pry. Sch.; Gudban/Korko; Hina/ Kofar Jauro; Hurtunda/ Kofar Jauro; Kanjara/ Pry. Sch.; Kampamta/ Kofar Jauro; Kwanta/ Pry. Sch.; Kojoli/Wanthera/ K/Jauro Kojoli; Njenjiba/ Kofar Jauro; Tubar/ Kofar Jauro, Tubar; Urdun/ Hurshalima/ Kofar Jauro Urdun
Gombi	Gabun	Barda - Kofar Jauro; Bidim/ Kofar Jauro; Galgafun - Gagafun Pri. Sch; Ganjikta - Kofar Jauro; Hurduwa - Gabun Clinic; Hurgabun - Kofar Jauro; Kankeshir - Kofar Jauro; Kamsubura - Kofar Jauro; Wamerete - Kofar Jauro; Wumturu - Wumturu Pri. Sch.
Gombi	Gombi North	Bawa Centre/ Kofar Jauro; Gudumiya/ Kofar Jauro; Huji/ V. T. C. Gombi; Kofar Ahmadu Gadu/ K-Ahmadu Gadu; Makera/ Gombi II Pry. Sch. I; Makera/ Gombi II Pry. Sch. II; Makera/ Gombi II Pry. Sch. III; Makera/ Gombi II Pry. Sch. IV; Sabon Layi Sullubawa/ Gombi I Pry. Sch.; Sosai Tappare/ Kofar Jauro; Tashan Ga'Anda; Ung. Buba Ba Sullube/ Gindin Ganji; Ung. Moh'D Dan Hadeja/ Clinic II Gombi; Ung. Dadin Kowa/ Kofar Jauro Abdu
Gombi	Gombi South	Garin Dadi Mahauchi/ Kofar Dadi Mahauchi; Jekada Fari/ Gombi I Pry. Sch. I; Jekada Fari/ Gombi I Pry. Sch. II; Jekada Fari/ Gombi I Pry. Sch. III; Jekada Fari/ Gombi I Pry. Sch. IV; Old Market I; Old Market II; Sangere Mararaba/ Gombi II Pry. Sch.; Ung. Jauro Musa/ Kofar Jauro Musa I; Ung. Jauro Musa/ Kofar Jauro Musa II; Ung. Faransa/ Kofar Modibbo Suleiman I; Ung. Faransa/ Kofar Modibbo Suleiman II; Ung. Faransa/ Ung. Faransa Pry. Sch.; Ung. Faransa/ Islamiya Pry. Sch.
Gombi	Garkida	Hursama/ Kofar Jauro; Mbewa/ Kofar Jauro; Ung. Hausawa/ Kofar Jauro; Ung. Fulani/ Kofar Jauro; Ung. Pwossi/ Kofar Jauro I; Ung. Pwossi/ Kofar Jauro II; Ung. Kabura/ Kofar Jauro; Ung. Wakili Malam/ N/Garkida Pry. Sch. I; Ung. Wakili Malam/ N/Garkida Pry. Sch. II; Wuyaku/ Pry. Sch.
Gombi	Guyaku	Balwhowa/ Pry. Sch.; Dongo/ Kofar Jauro; Dzangola/ Pry. Sch.; Guyaku/ Guyaku Clinic; Hushipra/ Pry. Sch.; Jau/ Kofar Jauro; Kurara/ Kofar Jauro; Kwalamba/ Pry. Sch.; Parijo/ Pry. Sch.; Pirkasa/ Pry. Sch.; Sabon Gari/ Kofar Jauro; Virgwi/ Kofar Jauro; Ung. Sullubawa/ Kakwara; Wungara/Girgithang/ Pry. Sch.
Gombi	Tawa	Bokki Tawa/ Pry. Sch.; Dahai/ Mayozamba/ Kofar Jauro Dahai; G/Bebe/ Dispensary; Garfite/ Kofar Jauro; Kaudi Hona/ Kofar Jauro; Mararraban Bokki/ Kofar Jauro; Mijiwana/ Kofar Jauro; Muchalla/ Pry. Sch.; Wugulsa/ Kofar Jauro; Wulabara/ Wulaba Pry. Sch.
Gombi	Yang	Futena/ Pry. Sch.; Fotta Dutse/ Kofar Jauro; Ganjing/ Kofar Jauro; Kondusun/ Pry. Sch.; Sheno Gormoso/ Pry. Sch.; Yang/ Yang Pry. Sch. I; Yang/ Yang Pry. Sch. II
Guyuk	Banjiram	Banjiram/ K/M Banjiram; Deremina/ Banjiram Pry. Sch.; Deremina/ Gugu Pry. Sch.; Kwasalda/ Banjiram II Pry. Sch.; Kwasalda/ K/M Kwasalda; Kongora/ K/Dagacin Kwadada I; Krista/ Gss Banjiram
Guyuk	Bobini	Arah Teh/ Teh Pry. Sch.; Bilasi/ K/Dagacin Bobini; Dangu/ Dangu Pry. Sch.; Gwalam/ Gwalam Pry. Sch.; Jankaram/ Jankaram Pry. Sch.; Jauro Jalo/ K/Jauro Jalo; Krista/ Bobini Pry. Sch.
Guyuk	Bodeno	Bodeno/ Bodeno Pry. Sch.; Changilgaliye/ K/Maiunguwa; Doma/ Doma Pry. Sch.; Gorotoro/ Wawi/ Gorotoro Pry. Sch.; Mada/ Mada Pry. Sch.; Wawi/ Wawi Pry. Sch.
Guyuk	Chikila	Dangir Dutse/ K/Maiunguwa; Gimekiye/ Gimekiye Pry. Sch.; Gubaliye/ Gubaliye Pry. Sch.; Gubaliye/ K/M Zwarala; Gwalura/ K/M Gwalura; Gwasilwa/ Gwasilwa Pry. Sch.; Jaung/ K/M Jaung; Jiu Krista/ K/M Tholo; Jiukwata Pry. Sch.; Kalkira/Kofar D. Chikila; Kalwura/ Sili Centre Pry. Sch.; Krista Chikila/ Chikila Pry. Sch.; Krista Gwalura/ Gwalura Pry. Sch.; Krista Dangir/ K/M Krista; Krista Sili/ Sili Kassa Pry. Sch.; Thereng/ Sili T/ Pry. Sch.; Tholo/ Kongla K/M Unguwa; Womiye/ K/M Womiye; Yatsireliye/ Dangir Pry. Sch.; Yemothi/ K/M Yemothi
Guyuk	Dukul	Chirka/ Lamza II Pry. Sch.; Dakatsamza/ K/M Ung. Dakatsamza; Falu Tsikiye/ Falu Pry. Sch.; Gwanah/ Gwanah Pry. Sch.; Gwaziliya/ Gwaziliya Pry. Sch.; Kwagima/ Lamza Pry School; Kangima Tswinthire Pry. Sch.; Larabi/ Gundenyi Pry. Sch.; Tsikiye/ T/Kofar Mai Ungwar Falu; Walnye/ Gundenyi II Pry. Sch.; Walukrista/Walu Primary School; Zabala/ Zabala Pry. Sch.
Guyuk	Dumna	Bolekum/ Zakawon Pry. Sch.; Gwalura/ K/M Gwalura; Krista/ D/Dutse Pry. Sch.; Logali/ K/M Logali; Longuda/ Boshikiri Pry. Sch.; Sisikira Zirbu Pry. Sch.; Tsalbu/ K/Dagacin Tsalbu; Tekan/ Burthi Pry. Sch.
Guyuk	Guyuk	Chakawo/ K/M Chakawo; Gamabwasu/ Old Market; Jagira/ Jagira Pry. Sch.; Kwadangir/ Guyuk I Pry. Sch.; Kwampani/ K/Dagacin Bolekum; Nepa/ Nepa Office; Pillah/ K/Kwandi; Pwalamwarliye/ Police Barracks; Pwalamwarliye/ K/M Waja; Rabi/ K/Jauro Rabi; Sisikira/ K/M Sisikira; Swakise/ K/M Swakise; Zursingilaliye/ Central Sch.
Guyuk	Kola	Halaung/ Kerau Pry. Sch.; Kerau/ K/Dagacin Kerau; Kola Dutse/ K/Dagacin Kola; Kola Mission/ Kola Pry. Sch.; Krista/ Pondiwe Pry. Sch.; Lumbur/ K/M Lumbur; Mararabar Kola/ Kola II Pry. Sch.; Pondiwe/ K/M Pondiwe; Theble/ Theble Pry. Sch.; Yatsireliye/ K/M Yatsireliye
Guyuk	Lokoro	Deremina/ Lokoro Pry. Sch.; Gunda/ Gunda Pry. Sch.; Kawa/ K/Dagacin Kawa; Shidekise/ Market Square; Sukeliye/ Sukeliye Pry. Sch.; Yakwana/ K/M Yakwana
Guyuk	Purokayo	Deremina/ Purokayo Pry. Sch.; Deremina/ Kofar Dagacin Lakumna; Nassarawo/ Nassarawo Pry. Sch.; Zabisonka/ K/M Zabisonka
Hong	Bangshika	Bangshika Mission/ Kofar Jauro Haruna; Dilguda/ Kofar Jauro Ismaila; Dilmava/ Kofar Jauro Pella; Jiga-Jiga/ Kwambla Pry. Sch.; Kala'A Jalingo/ Kala'A Pry. Sch.; Kala'A Layi/ Kofar Jauro Abel; Kala'A Mission/ Kofar Jauro Kala'A; Kubutava/ Kubutava Pry. Sch.; Kwanan Kuka/ Kwanan Kuka Pry. Sch.; Kwatau/ Kwatau Pry. Sch.; Makera/ Makera Pry. Sch.; Mbalwaha/ Mbalwaha Pry. Sch.; Mblagyang/ Kofar Jauro Mblagyang; Mutuku/ Kofar Jauro Irimiya; Negadanya/ Kofar Jauro Usman; Pathangda/ Kofar Jauro Pathangda
Hong	Daksiri	Balanga/ Kofar Jauro Balanga; Bizirguna I/ Uding Pry. Sch. I; Bizirguna II/ Uding Pry. Sch. II; Bizirguna III/ Uding Pry. Sch. III; Dakza/ Dakza Pry. Sch.; Holma/ Kofar Jauro Holma; Unguwan Daksiri/ Daksiri Pry. Sch.; Unguwan Jagula/ Dilchinama Pry. Sch.; Unguwan Manda/ Mitil Daji Pry. Sch.; Unguwan Nuvu/ Tiding Pry. Sch.; Wajawari/ Zhedinyi Pry. Sch.; Wuro Bokki / Wuro Bokki Pry. Sch.
Hong	Garaha	Buzugu/ Kofar Jauro Ezra Yau; Duwariya/ Kofar Jauro Duwariya; Gabba/ Kofar Jauro Dogo; Garaha Dutse/ Garaha Dutse Pry. Sch.; Hulbara/ Kofar Jauro Hulbara; Kinging/ Kofar Jauro Alkali; Larh/ Kofar Jauro Hassan; Mijiji/ Kofar Jauro Caleb; Mojili I/ Garaha Mojili Pry. Sch.; Mojili II/ Garaha Mojili Pry. Sch.; Mojili III/ Garaha Mojili Pry. Sch.; Muzzu/ Kofar Sarki; Kwapre/ Kofar Joseph; Shashau/ Market Square
Hong	Gaya	Bugu/Chika/ Kofar Jauro Toma; Gartsanu/ Gartsanu Pry. Sch.; Gashala Guw/ Guw Pry. Sch.; Gashala Mbula/ Mubula Pry. Sch.; Gaya Bitirhuya/ Kofar Jauro Yohanna; Huduma/ Kofar Jauro Hamidu; Kuva Gaya I/ Kuva Gaya Pry. Sch.; Kuva Gaya II/ Kuva Gaya Pry. Sch.; Kuva Yashe/ Fa'A Pry. Sch.; Maki/ Maki Pry. Sch.; Mijili Fulani/ Kofar Jauro Mijili; Mijili Mission/ Mijili Pry. Sch.; Mubuta/ Kofar Jauro Mbuta; Mulata/ Kofar Jauro Mulata; Musda/ Kofar Jauro Haruna; Zubagu/ Kofar Jauro Zubagu
Hong	Hildi	Guw I/ Guw Pry. Sch.; Guw II/ Guw Pry. Sch.; Kadala/ Kofar Jauro Glaji; Kaigama/ Kofar Jauro Yaduma; Njemedi/ Njemedi Pry. Sch.; Paragalda I/ Hildi A. Pry. Sch.; Paragalda II/ Hildi A. Pry. Sch.; Sambo/ Hildi B. Pry. Sch.
Hong	Hong	Alhaji Sule/ Kofar Jauro Sule; Bikirmiya/ Fadama Reke Pry. Sch.; Dakfula I/ District Office Hong; Dakfula II/ Viewing Centre Hong; Dakfula III/ Kofar Jauro Bello; Dakfula IV/ Kofar Ahmadu Burba; Gudumiya/ Kofar Gudumiya Pry. Sch.; Kikidi Makera Fulani/ Kofar Jauro Makera; Kwabaktina/ Kwabaktina Pry. Sch.; Unguwan Alh. Umaru I/ Kofar Alh. Yuguda; Unguwan Alh. Umaru II/ Kofar Jauro Gudu; Unguwan Alh. Umaru III/ Dispensary Hong; Unguwan Alh. Umaru IV/ Jauro Isa Makera; Unguwan Alh. Umaru V/ Kofar Alh. Ahmadu (White House); Unguwan Hausawa I/ Kofar Jauro Hausawa; Unguwan Hausawa II/ Kofar Jauro Hausawa
Hong	Hushere Zum	Adda Abba/ Kofar Jauro Sule; Barkari/ Kofar Jauro Musa; Dadawaloji/ Kofar Abdullahi; Gangni/ Dziga Yerima Pry. Sch.; Jambala/ Garari Pry. Sch.; Jamtari/ Kofar Jauro Jamtari; Killing I/ Dilwachira Pry. Sch. I; Killing II/ Dilwachira Pry. Sch. I; Mallam Hassan/ Kofar Jauro Hassan; Marma/ Kofar Jauro Usman; Minyiu/ Kofar Ardo Salihu; Mombol I/ Mombol Pry. Sch.; Mombol II/ Market Square; Wuro Garba/ Kofar Jauro Moh'D
Hong	Kwarhi	Gashala/ Kofar Jauro Gashala; Gashala Migzil/ Migzil Pry. Sch.; Mararaba/ Near Alh. Bala's House; Sabon Gari/ Kwarhi A. Pry. Sch.; Tapare/ K. B. C.; Thalhuya/ Thalhuya Pry. Sch.
Hong	Mayo Lope	Gashala/ Gashala Pry. Sch.; Kumartai/ Kofar Jauro Kumartai; Kurmi Mayo Lope/ Kofar Jauro K/Mayo Lope; Mirinyi Fulani/ Kofar Jauro Fulani Miryi; Misirdanyi/ Gashala Dispensary; Njairi/ Njairi Pry. Sch.; Pada I/ Bakin Kasuwa; Pada II/ Bakin Kasuwa
Hong	Shangui	Gabba/ Shangui Pry. Sch.; Mandzaa/ Jauro Iliya; Mbuvu/ European Quarters; Munga/ Munga Pry. Sch.; Waja/ Kofar Jauro Timothawus
Hong	Thilbang	Babal Midilla/ Babal Midilla Pry. Sch.; Buzza/ Kofar Jauro Mile Bakwai; Dzambulau/ Thabu Pry. Sch.; Fachi/ Fachi Pry. Sch.; Gashaka/ Gashaka Pry. Sch.; Giwa Uding/ Ngalbi Pry. Sch.; G. S. S. Hong; Kokko/ Kofar Jauro Kokko; Madii/ Pella I Pry. Sch.; Sabon Layi/ Kofar Jauro Yakubu; Sibir Kucha'A/ Dzuma Pry. Sch.; Unguwan Fulani/ Market Square; Unguwan Hausawa/ Kofar Jauro Bako
Hong	Uba	Dumde I/ Uba C. Pry. Sch. I; Dumde II/ Uba C. Pry. Sch. II; Dumde III/ Uba Dispensary; Jalingo/ Jalingo Pry. Sch.; Mangau/ Kofar Jauro Mangau; Mubula/ Kofar Jauro Sisi; Mufa Chaka/ Kofar Alh. Buba; Mufare/ Kofar Jauro Migilda; Para/ Market Square; Unguwan Sarki I/ District Office I; Unguwan Sarki II/ District Office I; Wuro Kae/ Kofar Jauro Wuro Kae
Jada	Danaba	Bawuro/ Bawuro Pry. Sch.; Bello Tonga/ Kofar Jauro Bello Tonga; Danaba Tsoho/ Danaba Pry. Sch.; Dashe/ Kofar Jauro Dashe; Dimkusun/ Dimkusun Pry. Sch.; Gangsanen/ Kofar Jauro Gangsanen; Gangtangen/ Nadeu Primary School; Kamenya/ Kamenya Pry. Sch.; Naguma/ Wuro Alhaji/ Naguma Pry. Sch.; Sabon Layi/ Danaba Pry. Sch.; Saman/ Kofar Jauro Saman; Pry Sch Sandaguni; Sanguding/Sanguding Pry Sch; Sankeupo/ Sankeupo Pry. Sch.
Jada	Jada I	Bappate/ L. G Nursery, Pry. Sch.; Bello Ma'Aji/ Kofar Jauro Bello Ma'Aji; Bobda/ Kofar Jauro Bobda; Jamtari/ Jamtari Pry. Sch.; Kolere I/ Kofar Sarki Jada; Kolere II/ Kofar Sarki Jada; Kolere III/ Jada Dispensary; Kolere IV/ Jada Dispensary; Marware I/ Kofar Jauro Marware; Marware II/ L. C. C. N Bookshop Jada; Nyagang Kugama/ Kofar Jauro Nyagang; Tudun Wada I/ Jada I Pry. Sch.; Tudun Wada II/ Jada I Pry. Sch.; Wailare/ Gindin Rimi Wailare; Wuro Alh/ Jauro Laro/ Kofar J. Laro; Wuro Hausa/ Central Pry. Sch.; Kashin Yawo / L. G Nursery Pri. Sch.
Jada	Jada II	Dagbeula Gari/ Kona Uku Pry. Sch.; Dam/ Kofar Modibbo Yahya Wuro Reke; Duta - Era I/Kofar Jauro Duta Era; Duta - Era II/Kofar Jauro Duta Era; Gettado/ Kofar Jauro Gettado; G. S. S. Jada/ G. S. S. Jada; John Holt/ Gangwaso Pry. Sch.; Katsina I/ Kofar Jauro Katsina; Katsina II/ Kofar Jauro Katsina; Keumsi/ Kofar Jauro Keumsi; Pakorgel/ Pakorgel Pry. Sch.; Sarkin Yamma/ Sarkin Yamma Pry. Sch.; Wuro Yerima/ Kofar Jauro Alh. Buba
Jada	Koma I	Choncha/ Choncha Pry. Sch.; Dakpali/ Kofar Jauro Dakpali; Delengi/ Kofar Jauro Delengi; Gawi/ Gawi Pry. Sch.; Karo/Pindo/ Gindin Dimbo; Nali/ Kofar Jauro Nali; Nassarawo/ Nassarawo Pry. Sch.; Ngolomba/ Kofar Jauro Ngolomba; Saru Gari/ Kofar Jauro Saru Gari; Tantile/ Tantile Pry. Sch.; Unguwan Kalo/ Kofar Jauro Kalo; Usman Yammi I/ Kofar Jauro Gabdo; Usman Yammi II/ Kofar Jauro Usman Yammi; Wip/ Kofar Jauro Wip; Yebri/ Kofar Jauro Yebri
Jada	Koma II	Bantaji/ Kofar Jauro Bantaji; Betti/ Betti Pry. Sch.; Delli/ Kofar Jauro Delli; Gbaggi/ Kofar Jauro Gbaggi; Kewal/Kewal Pry. Sch.; Komni/ Kofar Jauro Komni; Konglo/ Kofar Jauro Konglo; Namjoro/ Kofar Jauro Namjoro; Samlo/ Samlo Pry. Sch.; Suli/ Kofar Jauro Suli; Tuli/ Tuli Pry. Sch.; Wari Bata/ Kofar Jauro Wari Bata; Wuro Jatau/ Gindin Mango Tree
Jada	Leko	Abejo/ Kofar Jauro Abejo; Open Space(Kj Usman Bayami); Chitta/ Chitta Pry. Sch.; Dalami/ Dalami Pry. Sch.; Football Field Dinaru; Football Field Dundehi; Gaji/ Gaji Pry. Sch.; Gwalgu Pry Sch; Jauro Fulani/ Kofar Jauro Gindin Kuka; Kubi Pry Sch .; Kubi Yero/ Kubi Yero Pry. Sch.; Mayo Hako/ Mayo Hako Clinic; So'O/ So'O Pry. Sch.
Jada	Mapeo	Dimkemi/ K. J. Kulu Wurba Koma; Fulani/ Kofar Jauro Fulani; Jalingo I/ Jalingo Dispensary; Open Space Jalingo II Lettere(Jalingo II/K/J Lettere); Kareji Natubi/ Kofar Jauro Natubi; Kojoli Jabbe/ Kojoli Jabbe Pry. Sch.; Lengdo I/ Lengdo Pry. Sch. I; Lengdo II/ Lengdo Pry. Sch. II; Mapeo/ Mayo Bewa/ Mapeo Pry. Sch.; Tappare/ Kofar Jauro Tappare; Vere/ Kofar Arnado Vere
Jada	Mayokalaye	Bagobiri/ Normadic Pry. Sch. Bagobiri; Dabala/ Kofar Jauro Dabala; Gangnai/ Gangnai Pry. Sch.; Gonglare/ Gonglare Pry. Sch.; Kilbawo/ Kilbawo Pry. Sch.; Modawal/ Kofar Jauro Modawal; Mayo Diya/ Kofar Jauro Mayo Diya; Nassarawo Jiru/ Nassarawo Pry. Sch.; Tasau Korkai/ Tasau Pry. Sch.; Wuro Abbo/ Wuro Abbo Pry. Sch.; Wuro Londe/ Jodare/ Gindin Tsamiya S/Gari
Jada	Mbulo	Farang Rai/ Kofar Jauro Farang Rai; Farang Van/ Farang Van Pry. Sch.; Gangmobi/ Gangmobi Pry. Sch.; Gangsanji/ Gangsanji Pry. Sch.; Area Court Kareji Natubi; Gangyaki/ Gangyaki Pry. Sch.; Jarandi/ Kofar Jauro Jarandi; Islamiya Pry Sch Jauro Joda; Kojoli/ Gangalada/ Gangalada Pry. Sch.; Pry Sch Tappare; Pry Sch Vere; Mbulo Kombuwal/ Mbulo K. Pry. Sch.; Pola/ Pola Pry. Sch.; Sabon Layi/ Mbulo Pry. Sch.; Gdss Mbulo; Timkoba/ Kofar Jauro Timkoba; Pry Sch Weyibenso
Jada	Nyibango	Banche/ Banche Pry. Sch.; Boro/ Boro Pry. Sch.; Dashen/ Dashen Pry. Sch.; Open Space Kj/Gangabdu; Gangkoben/ Gangkoben Pry. Sch.; Open Space Kj/Gangsaka; Gangwaja/ Gangwaja Pry. Sch.; Jarandi Pry Sch; Madugu/ Girl Child Pry. Sch.; Open Space Kj/Mayo Galbi; Nyibango/ Nyibango Pry. Sch.; Sabon Gari I/Sabon Gari Pry Sch; Open Space Kj Sabon Gari; Supen/ Kofar Jauro Supen; Wuro Jatau/ Damoka Pry. Sch.
Jada	Yelli	Alh. Mayine/ Kofar J. Alh. Mayine; Alh. Jatau/ Kofar J. Alh. Jatau; Bello Ndamba/ Wuro Usman Pry. Sch.; Kojoli 2 Pry Sch (Bikkoi Kaji); Mboju Majadu; Borkono/ Borkono Pry. Sch.; Dagga/ Jaggi/ Kofar Jauro Dagga; Gadjo/ Gadjo Pry. Sch.; Kali/ Bayero/ Kofar Jauro Kali; Kojoli I/ Kojoli Pry. Sch.; Kojoli II/ Kofar Jauro Fulani; Namberu/ Namberu Pry. Sch.; Sapeo/ Sapeo Pry. Sch.; Sudi Chede/ Kofar Jauro Sudi; Kojoli 3 Pry Sch
Lamurde	Dubwangun	Bafyau/ Bafyau Pry. Sch.; Bafyau/ Kofar Jauro; Goh/ Kofar Jauro; Kwanogwe/ Kofar Jauro; Kwazumong/ Kofar Baba Giwa; Mbemun/ Unguwan Mission; Mbemun/ Kofar Jauro; Pude/ Kofar Baba Miji; Pude/ Kofar Mal. Iko; Tabongo/ Dubwangun Pry. Sch.
Lamurde	Gyawana	Bimukaling/ Kofar Mai Anguwa; Fanz / Senior Staff Club I; Fanz / Senior Staff Club II; Garin Mallam Isa/ Kofar Jauro; Garin Overseer/ Kofar Jauro; Kasuwan Dare/ Kofar Mai Anguwa; Low Cost/ Junior Staff Club; Mupun/Kofar Jauro; Ngbakowo/ Kofar Jauro; Supto/ Kofar Jauro
Lamurde	Lafiya	Dispensary/ Lafiya Dispensary; Lafiya/ Lafiya Pry. Sch.; Mamsirme/ Mamsirme Pry. Sch.; Mamsirme/ Kofar Sarki; Mere/ Lafiya Market; Tsohon Sarki/ Kofar Tsohon Sarki; Tsohon Tasha/ Kofar Wakili Paul
Lamurde	Lamurde	Hadiyo/ Kofar Mallam Ma'Amu; Hadiyo/ Kofar Paul Ogah; Gomburto/ Motor Park; Kasuwa/ Old Market; Kpashimuna/ Gindin Tsamiya; Madon/ Vude Kwete; Mwana/ Kofar Baba Ethan; Mwana/ Mwana Pry. Sch.; Mwanatari/ Mwanatari Pry. Sch.; Ngbebonge/ Ngbeonge Pry. Sch.; Sabon Gari/ Kofar Sarkin Kasuwa; Sabon Gari/ Unguwa Katsinawa; Sanga/ Viewing Centre; Shafan/ Town Hall; Tanzoluti/ Lamurde Pry. Sch.
Lamurde	Mgbebongun	Badun/ Kofar Sarki; Botoni/ Kofar Jauro; Hodipwa/ Kofar Jauro.; Kutu/ Kofar Jauro; Sabon Layi/ Sabon Lati Pry Sch; Tubto/ Tubto Pry Sch; Wammi/ Kofar Jauro; Tingno Kogi/ Pry. School; Tingno Kogi/ Kofar Wakili
Lamurde	Ngbakowo	Jangagura/ Ngbakowo Pry Sch.; Kabawa/ Kofar Jauro; Kabawa/ Kofar Sarkin Hausawa.; Kowei/ Kofar Jauro; Ngodogoron/ Kofar Jauro; Ngodogoron/ Kofar Wakili; Pomokolang/ Kofar Mai Anguwa
Lamurde	Opalo	Dauto/ Kofar Jauro; Gwasala/ Kofar Mai Anguwa; Hoki/ Hoki Pry. Sch.; Kwalikita/ Kofar Eram; Ngbaruwe/ Kofar Tufule; Ngbazikang/ Kofar Mai Anguwa; Shemun/ Kofar Jauro; Takusang/ Opalo Pry. Sch.; Zekun/ Zekun Pry. Sch.
Lamurde	Rigange	Bajen/ Kofar Jauro; Bajen/ Kwahabun; Dome/ Kofar Mal. Neban; Gongong/ Kofar Mai Anguwa; Korgosei/ Kofar Mai Anguwa; Ngbamupto/ Rigange Pry. Sch.; Tito/ Kofar Sarkin Hausawa; Tito/ Tito Pry. Sch.; Zina/ Kofar Jekamiah
Lamurde	Suwa	Bagani Song/ Kofar Jauro; Bariki/ Suwa Pry. Sch. I; Bariki/ Suwa Pry. Sch. II; Bollore/ Bollore Pry. Sch.; Bollore/ Kofar Mai Anguwa; Bulkutu/ Bulkutu Pry. Sch.; Bunari/ Bunari Pry. Sch.; Dullum/ Dullum Pry. Sch.; Goye Kizza/ Kofar Yohanna Madaki; Lassun/ Lassun Pry. Sch.; Ruwan Zafi/ Kofar Mai Anguwa; Sabon Pegi/ Kofar Wakili
Lamurde	Waduku	Bandawa/ Kofar Jauro; Dwenti/ Kofar Mai Anguwa; Gyilla/ Kofar Jauro; Kagbare/ Kofar Mai Ung. James; Kwahuba/ Kofar Mal. Sunday; Kwa Mission/ Kofar Baba Elam; Lagos/ Kofar Mai Anguwa; Ngbabonge/ Waduku Pry. Sch.; Ngbayofe/ Vude Poto; Tingno Tsakiya/ Kofar Bala Dangogo
Madagali	Babel	Bebel; Dirif/ Near Bulama's Resi.; Kamburu/ Sukur Sett Pry. Sch. I; Mazawa/ Mazawa Pry. Sch.; Nyibango/ Nyibango Pry. Sch.; Wuro Sara/ Wuro Sara Pry. Sch.
Madagali	Duhu/ Shuwa	Duhu Mayo/ Njahili Pry. Sch.; Gwaba Nuhu I/ Duhu Pry. Sch. I; Gwaba Nuhu II/ Duhu Pry. Sch. II; Haruna/ Birshishiwa Pry. Sch.; Kolbadi/ Kolbadi Pry. Sch.; Kuburshuwa/ Near Lawan's House; Kwambula/ Kwabula Pry. Sch.; Lumadu/ Lumadu Pry. Sch.; Ndirakudiya/ Duriya Dluku Area; Shuwa Bakari I/ Shiwa Cen. Pry. Sch. I; Shuwa Bakari II/ Shiwa Cen. Pry. Sch. II; Shuwa Bakari III/ Shiwa Cen. Pry. Sch. III; Shuwa Kutiju I/ Shiwa Cen. Pry. Sch. I; Shuwa Kutiju II/ Shiwa Cen. Pry. Sch. II; Thalwachina/ Thalwachina Pry. Sch.
Madagali	Gulak	Daryirthal/ Market Area; Gadadamai Kuda/ Pry. Sch. Gadadamai; Gdss/ Gdss Football Field; Ghantsa/ Ghantsa Pry. Sch.; Ghumbili/ Open Square; Giwakamda/ Giwa Mbula Pry. Sch.; Gulak Gari I/ District Office I; Gulak Gari II/ District Office II; Gwaram/ Village Open Square; Imirsa/ Imirsa Pry. Sch.; Jalingo I/ Jalingo Pry. Sch. I; Jalingo II/ Jalingo Pry. Sch. II; Kaya Kadir/ Kaya Pry. Sch.; Kuda Wazu/ Village Open Square; Lumare/ Market Square; Mararaba Jatau I/ Cent. Pry. Sch.; Mararaba Jatau II/ Cent. Pry. Sch.; Ngurgu'U/ Ngurgu'U Pry. Sch.; Wanu Muzai/ Wanu Pry. Sch.
Madagali	Hyambula	Bitiku Juli/ Juli Pry. Sch.; Bitiku Papka/ Health Centre; Gadadamai/ Village Open Square; Kafin Hausa/ Kafin Hausa Pry. Sch.; Makandau/ Hyabula Pry. Sch.; Ngur Madu/ Near Mallam's Res.; Sabon Gari I/ Market Square I; Sabon Gari II/ Market Square II; Shaban/ Disp. Hyambula
Madagali	K/Wuro Ngayandi	Duwala/ Duwala Pry. Sch.; Eliyasu/ Phc Kopa; Gwazu/ Maradi Pry. Sch.; Kirchinga I/ Gdss Kirchinga; Kirchinga II/ Gdss Kirchinga; Ko'E/ Kopa Cent. Pry. Sch.; Kopa Ladan/ Kopa Pry. Sch.; Kuda Wuro/ Wuro Nganyadi Pry. Sch.; Maiganamargi/ At Shuwari Pry School; Nasarawo/ Gadamaye Pry. Sch.
Madagali	Madagali	Ardo Ahmadu/ Dev. Area Office; Burhang I/ Near Lawan's Area I; Burhang II/ Near Lawan's Area II; Disa/ Disa Open Square; Humshi/ Ardo's Open Field; Hurgo/ Hurgo Pry. Sch.; Ijafaru I/ Gss Madagali; Ijafaru II/ Gss Madagali; Kaigama/ Open Square; Sabon Gari I/ Gss Madagali; Sabon Gari II/ Gss Madagali; Sabon Layi I/ Sabon Layi Pry. Sch.; Sabon Layi II/ Sabon Layi Pry. Sch.; Visik Matakam/ Open Square; Visik Yale/ Visik Pry. Sch.
Madagali	Pallam	Gari/ In Front Of Bulamas House; Giwa Gulak/ Market Square; Husada/ Husada Pry. Sch.; Kauye/ Kauye Pry. Sch.; Kwafur/ Dzuel Pry. Sch.; Kwapalma/ Wudufi Duriya; Kyalde/ In Front Of Bulamas House; Sidagha/ Open Square; Wudifi/ Open Square; Wudumulmu/ Pallam Pry. Sch.; Wurogas I/ Wurogas Pry. Sch.; Wurogas II/ Open Square
Madagali	Shelmi / Sukur/ Vapura	Dugun/ Village Open Square; Giwa Tumahu/ Ward Head Area; Guvak/ Jira Pry. Sch.; Jilang/ Jilang Kafin Hausa; Kurang/ Near Ward Head Area; Mafer/ Mafer Pry. Sch.; Rugudum/ Rugudum Pry. Sch.; Sabon Gari/ Market Square; Shishiwa/ Mildu Pry. Sch.; Tilmari/ Ward Head Area; Ubashi/ Near Ardo's Area; Vapura/ Vapura Pry. Sch.
Madagali	Wagga	Chakawa Gari/ Chakawa Pry. Sch.; Danzang/ Near Ardo's Res.; Dumankara/ Liman Kara Square; Gamace/ Wagga Mangoro; Gubla I/ Gubla Pry. Sch.; Gubla II/ Gubla Pry. Sch.; Jilayu/ At Majibe Bulama; Madira/ Wagga Pry. Sch.; Magar/ Near Magar Orchard; Mandaka/ Mandaka Pry. Sch.; Turtakiva/ Tur Pry. Sch.; Zake /Wagga Mangoro
Madagali	Wula	Dirbilla/ Ardo's Open Square; Kushir/ Village Open Square; Muduvu/ Muduvu Pry. Sch.; Wakulu/ Near Bulama's Res.; Wutukuvu/ Ardo's Open Square; Zulumtum/ Village Open Square
Maiha	Belel	Belel/ Belel Pry. Sch.; Boloko/ Boloko Pry. Sch.; Bungel/ Kofar Ardo Hammawa; Jamtari I; Jamtari II; Jamtari III; Belel Pry Sch; Kirngabu/ Bakin Kwalta; Kolere A/ Kofar Jauro Danburam; Kolere B/ Kofar Jauro Buba; Pette Gari/ Kofar Ardo; Sabon Layi/ Kofar Jauro Julde; Gss Belel
Maiha	Humbutudi	Basulum/ Lugdira Pry. Sch.; Dalehi/ Dalehi Dispensary; Dilwacira/ Mbalagi Pry. Sch.; Humbutudi/ Humbutudi Pry. Sch. I; Humbutudi/ Humbutudi Pry. Sch. II; Humbutudi Pry Sch; Kwalavaya/ Behind Ayuba's House; Lubum/ Kofar Jauro; Mudurusa/ Kofar Jauro; Murkuma/ Kofar Jauro; Parnyel/ Kofar Jauro
Maiha	Konkol	Bakin Kasuwa A/ Kofar Jauro Adamu I; Bakin Kasuwa B/ Kofar Jauro Adamu II; Bantahi/ Kofar Tella Njidda; Bappare/ Kofar Jauro Buba; Konkol Pry Sch; Ibadan/ Konkol Dispensary; Mararaban Konkol/ Konkol 1 Pry. Sch.; Wuro Bamadi/ Kofar Isa Iyawa
Maiha	Maiha Gari	Boken/ Boken Pry. Sch.; Mandara Pry Sch; Jaba Jaba/ Kofar Jauro; Karewa/ Kofar Jauro; Lugga/ Lugga Dispensary; Maiha Gari/ Maiha Gari Dispensary I; Maiha Gari/ Maiha Gari Dispensary II; Nasarawo/ Mandara Pry. Sch. I; Nasarawo/ Mandara Pry. Sch. II; Nassarawo Lugga/ Kofar Jauro
Maiha	Manjekin	Dafra/ Kofar Jauro Yahya; Gashiga/ Kofar Hamman Laral; Jalingo - Bu/ Kofar Yerima Sajo; Jambutu/ Salma Pry. Sch.; Kwa'Abo'On/ Kwa'Abo'On Pry. Sch.; Manjekin/ Manjekin Pry. Sch. I; Manjekin/ Manjekin Pry. Sch. II; Matsimin/ Kofar Jauro; Wuro Kawu/ Wuro Kawu Pry. Sch.; Yango/ Kofar Modibbo Sadu
Maiha	Mayonguli	Buba Pakka 'A'/ Kofar Jauro I; Buba Pakka 'B'/ Mazulva Pry. Sch. II; Buba Pakka 'C'/ Mazulva Pry. Sch. III; Bwade/ Kofar Jauro; Fada/ District Office I; Fada/ District Office II; Fulbere/ Kofar Jauro; Hamdalla/ Kofar Jauro Ali; Hudu/ Kofar Jauro; Jalingo Maiha Pry Sch; Mangiden/ Kofar Ardo; Nassarawo/ Maksha Pry. Sch. I; Nassarawo/ Maksha Pry. Sch. II; Panjauda/ Kofar Jauro I; Panjauda/ Kofar Jauro II; Toungo/ Jalingo Maiha Pry. Sch. I; Toungo/ Jalingo Maiha Pry. Sch. II
Maiha	Pakka	Furemane/ Kofar Jauro Hamman; Kuwa/ Kofar Jauro; Ma'Ane/ Kofar Jauro; Madeda/ Pakka Pry. Sch.; Maduwa/ Market Square I; Maduwa/ Market Square II; Pegin/ Pegin Pry. Sch.; Pakka Pry Sch; Toungo/ Kofar Ardo
Maiha	Sorau 'A'	Kowagol/ Kowagol Pry. Sch.; Kubare/ Kofar Jauro; Njillang/ Kofar Jauro; Wuro Boka/ Kofar Jauro; Wuro Gende/ Kofar Jauro; Wuro Kolwa/ Kofar Jauro; Wuro Ladde/ Wuro Ladde Pry. Sch.
Maiha	Sorau 'B'	Bafere/ Kofar Jauro; Bokkire/ Mayo Vamde Pry. Sch.; Bolware/ Sorau Pry. Sch.; Gashiga/ Kofar Jauro; Holmare/ District Office I; Holmare/ District Office II; Kolere/ Sorau Pry. Sch.; Gss Sorau (B); Lainde/ Kofar Jauro Lamu; Masagala/ Masagala Pry. Sch.; Tara/ Kofar Jauro; Wafango/ Kofar Jauro
Maiha	Tambajam	Daram/ Kofar Commissioner; Disa/ Kofar Jauro; Dzarma/ Kofar Jauro; Mabegechi/ Kofar Jauro; Tambajam/ Tambajam Pry. Sch.; Wuro Alh./ Wuro Alh. Pry. Sch.; Wuro Iya/ Wuro Iya Pry. Sch.; Wuro Jagi/ Bawo Hosere Pry. Sch.; Wuro Majabi/ Kofar Jauro
Mayo - Belwa	Bajama	Bajama Fulani Pri. School; Dapanti K/Jaso/ Gorobi Pry. Sch.; Goni/ Goni Pry. Sch.; Kudaku J/Maisamari/ Gorobi Pry. Sch.; Wakare/ Kofar Jauro; Wakule/ Goni Pry. Sch.; Wayere I/ Kofar J/Wayere I; Wayere II/ Kofar J/Wayere II
Mayo - Belwa	Binyeri	Bamfo/ Bamfo Pry. Sch.; Binyeri I/ Binyeri Pry. Sch. I; Binyeri II/ Binyeri Pry. Sch. II; Binyeri III/ Binyeri Pry. Sch. III; Binyeri IV/ Kofar Jauro Dupen; Boyu/ Boyu Pry. Sch.; Gangbarani/G/Pana/ Kofar J/G/Barani; Gangpana/ Gangpana Pry. Sch.; Gangtagani I/ G/Tagani Pry. Sch. I; Gangtagani II/ G/Tagani Pry. Sch. II; Hammagabdo/ Kofar Jauro H/Gabdo; Jampuru/ Jampuru Pry. Sch.; Moki/ Moki Pry. Sch.
Mayo - Belwa	Gangfada	Ardo Baya/ Kofar Jauro; Gambe I/ Gambe Pry. Sch. I; Gambe II/ Gambe Pry. Sch. II; Gangfada/ G/Fada Pry. Sch.; Gangkerol/ Kofar Jauro; Mashiyeri/ Polakuni Pry. Sch.; Mbanga/ Mbanga Pry. Sch.; Mbullo/ Kofar Jauro; Pola Kanoki/ Kofar Jauro; Pola Kuni/ Kofar Maiunguwa; Sittim/M/Koleni/ Koleni Pry. Sch.; Tibabara/ Kofar Jauro
Mayo - Belwa	Gengle	Bidda/ Bidda Pry. Sch.; Gengle/ Gengle Pry. Sch.; Kancharoo/ Kofar Jauro; Kona/ Kona Pry. Sch.; Kugama/ Kugama Manga Pry. Sch.; Kugama Wuro Dabo/ Kofar Jauro Kugama; Tugga Wuro / Tugga Pry School; Wappa Fulani/ Wappa Pry. Sch.; Wuro Aminu/Kofar Jauro; Yandang Karaje/ Y/ Karaje Pry. Sch.
Mayo - Belwa	Gorobi	Dapanti Yudindin/ A/ Manga Pry. Sch.; Noking/ Kofar Jauro Noking; Nyabalang/ Kofar Jauro Nyabalang; Ubakka I/ Ubakka Pry. Sch. I; Ubakka II/ Ubakka Pry. Sch. II; Wageren Yelwa/ Wageren Pry. Sch.; Watachi I/ Kofar Jauro Watachi; Watachi II/ Kofar Jauro Watachi; Wagure/ Kofar J/Wagure; Wakka/ Wakka Pry. Sch.; Yazani Tumari/ Kofar J/ Tumari; Yotti Giriri/ Mayolope Pry. Sch.
Mayo - Belwa	Mayo-Belwa	Hammanyero I - Old Nursery Pri. Sch.; Hammanyero II - Old Motor Park; Hayatu I Old Township Police Station; Hayatu II - Kofar Bello Umar; Jamtari - Kofar Jauro; Sabon Gari - G. S. S M / Belwa; Sarkin Shanu I - Mayo Belwa I; Sarkin Shanu II - Mayo Belwa II; Tudun Wada I - T /Wada Pri. Sch. I; Tudun Wada II - T /Wada Pri. Sch. II; Tudun Wada III - T /Wada Pri. Sch. III; Tudun Wada IV Lamdo Kabbi; Model Pry Sch I; Model Pry Sch II; Wuro Abba / M / Saganare - Mbilla Pri. Sch.; Wuro Abba / Vendalam - Kofar J/V/Dalam; Wuro Jabbi - L. G Secretariat; Wuro Mana I - Islamiya Pri. Sch. I; Wuro Mana II - Islamiya Pri. Sch. II; Wuro Mana III - Islamiya Pri. Sch.; Yelwa I - Yelwa Pri. Sch. I; Yelwa II - Yelwa Pri. Sch. II; Zango I - Viewing Centre; Zango II - Inside UNICEF Pry. Sch.
Mayo - Belwa	Mayo Farang	Dibanci Jilima I/ Kofar Jauro Teme; Dibanci Jilima II/ Kofar Jauro Dibanci; Gijaro/ Gijaro Pry. Sch.; Gunure/ Kofar Jauro; Kokoli/ Kofar Jauro; Kusake R/Giwa/ R/Giwa Pry. Sch.; Laide Dangsa Gijaro/ K/Jauro Laide; Liringo/Sakingo/ Kofar J/Liringo; Mayo Farang I/ Mayo Farang Pry. Sch. I; Mayo Farang II/ Mayo Farang Pry. Sch. II; Mayo Lamja/ Mayo Lamja Pry. Sch.; Mbalgare/ Mbalgare Pry. Sch.; Ngorong/ Kofar Jauro; Sate Koseyel - Joye/ Kofar Jauro; Sebore Ahmadu I/ Kofar J/Sebore; Sebore Ahmadu II/ Sebore Pry. Sch.; Wuro Alim/Kj W/Alim; Wuro Biriji/ Kofar Jauro Bello; Wuro Liman/ Kofar J/W/Liman; Wuro Yombe/ W/Yombe Pry. Sch.
Mayo - Belwa	Nassarawo Jereng	Bambe Fulani - Bambe Pri. Sch.; Bura/ Bura Pri. Sch.; Dadoru / Dadoru Pri. Sch.; Dangsa / Kofar J/ Dangsa; Dangsa / Bargal / Dangsa Pri. Sch.; Ganglamja/G/Pelum / Ganglamja Pri. Sch.; Jatuluyu / Kofar Jauro; Jeleng / Jeleng Pri. Sch.; Jereng Fulani / Jereng Pri. Sch.; Jereng Hausa / Viewing Centre; Mumnapi Yamdo / Kofar Jauro Yamdo; Pong / Mibolo / Kofar Jauro; Zabi / Sakla / Zabi Pri. Sch.
Mayo - Belwa	Ndikong	Dalehi / Dalehi Pri. Sch.; Garu - Gari / Garu Pri. Sch.; Jamdudi /Jamdudi Pri. Sch.; Mayo Jafa/Nyakari / Kofar Mai Unguwa; Nassarawo / Ndikong Pri. Sch.; Ndikong Diwa Yanta / Ndikong Pri. Sch.; Sindigawo / Sindigawo Pri. Sch.; Wuro Jauro Gumbi / Kofar Jauro Gumbi; Wuro Yombe/ Kugama / Wuro Yombe Pri. Sch.
Mayo - Belwa	Tola	Bura / Bura Pri. Sch.; Dayino Kossa / Kofar J/ Dayino; Dejja M / Lesdi / Kofar J / Dejja; Fada I / Tola V/Centre I; Fada II / Tola V/Centre II; Gang Bindol I / Tola Market I; Gang Bindol II / Tola Market II; Gangdidol / Kofar J/Gangdidol; Gangwaso Kofa - G/Waso Pri. Sch.; Gangwaso Bakari / Kofar J/G/Waso; Kibang / Kibang Pri. Sch.; Sabon Gari W/Jama'A / Kofar Jauro/W/Jama'A; Tola Jabu / Kossa - Tola Jabu Pri. Sch.; Walowol Iware / Kofar Jauro
Mayo - Belwa	Yoffo	Binkola Gari I /Binkola Pri. Sch. I; Binkola Gari I I /Binkola Pri. Sch. II; Chukkol Batare / Chukkol Batare Pri. Sch.; Chukkol Joda G. D. S. S Chukkol; Dundere / Kofar Jauro; Kanjang Kofar Jauro; Mayo Lamja Karimu / M/Lamja Pri. Sch.; Mbela Lagaje / Mbela Pri. Sch.; Mumbake / Mumbake Pri. Sch.; Namjo Fulani / Namjo Pri. Sch.; Ndiyam Dadi Kofar Jauro; Wuro Bornoji / Kofar Jauro; Yoffo Fulani / Yoffo Pri. Sch.
Michika	Bazza Margi	Jule / Biang Pri. Sch.; Kamingiri / Kamingiri Pri. Sch.; Ldaba / Ldaba Pri. Sch.; Mukulo / Kofar Bulama; Pou Drimbi / F. W. A Pri. Sch.; Ung. Ardo / Kasuwa Bazza I; Ung. Ardo / Kasuwa Bazza II
Michika	Futudou / Futules	Dabala Vandi I & II /Kofar Bulama Zira; Dibike / Ung Bulama; Didibe Tizhe / Ung Bulama; Gamb A / Ung. Bulama; Himikeless I & II / Ung. Bulama; Kampika I& II / Futuless Pri. Sch; Kwakwaghume / Ung. Bulama Hinci; Kavoa / Vagura / Ung. Bulama Dipe.; Kavao/ Ung. Bulama; Muzayi / Gamba / Futudou Pri. Sch.; Mulke / Kofar Bulama; Nde / Magwa / Ung Bulama; Ung. Ardo / Ung. Ardo Futudou; Yiwa Tapwa / Ung. Bulama Detumba; Whazili/ Tse
Michika	Garta / Ghunchi	Ghumghani / Ghunghani Pri. Sch.; Gwarme / Viam - Ung. Viam; Hosere/ Dzukwi - Ung. Bulama; Kamelgu /Ghuchi Pri. Sch.; Kwabardade / Kwabardade Pri. Sch.; Magwa / Kankala Garta Pri. Sch.; Ndimndimi / Ung. Bulama; Ung. Ardo / G. D. S. S Garta; Whazama / Central Pri. Sch. Garta
Michika	Jigalambu	Gari Biri / View Centre; Garu Pulu / Old Market; Jigalambu / Jigalambu Pri. Sch.; Kankilachimi / Kankila Pri. Sch.; Kura / Tsandza - Ung. Bulama; T / Wada / Muzu - Tudun Wada Pri. Sch.
Michika	Madzi	Bulashafa / Bulashafa Pri. Sch.; Kubi / Kasuwan Kubi; Kwadzale / Kuburshosho Pri. Sch.; Watu I / Watu Pri. Sch. I; Watu II / Watu Pri. Sch. II; Yambule / Yambule Pri. Sch.
Michika	Michika I	Fulbere / Area Court No I; Fulbere / Central Pri. Sch.; Hausari/ Near D. H. Office; Hausari / Hausari Pri. Sch. I; Hausari / Hausari Pri. Sch. II; Hausari / Hausari Pri. Sch. III; Kolere / Timber Shed; Matakam I / Central Pri. Sch. I; Matakam II / Central Pri. Sch. II; Sabon Layi I / Near Agric Office; Sabon Layi II / Co-Op. Office; Ubare I / Co-Op. Office; Ubare II / Area Court No I; Zaibadari I / Zaibadari Pri. Sch. I; Zaibadari II / Zaibadari Pri. Sch. II; Zaibadari III / Zaibadari Pri. Sch. III
Michika	Michika II	Chasdewol I / Chasdewol Pri. Sch.; Chasdewol II /G. S. S Michika; Jang / G. S. S Jang; Lughu / Lughu Pri. Sch.; Munkurahe / Central Pri. Sch.; Sangere I / G. S. S Michika; Sangere II / Yaskule Pri. Sch.
Michika	Minkisi/ Wuro Ngiki	Ardo Ma'Azu/ Pambula Pry. Sch.; Dlira / Ung. Bulama; Drigimi/ Drigimi Pry. Sch.; Jiddel I/ Jiddel Pry. Sch.; Jiddel I/ Nurvoa Pry. Sch.; Mbororo/ Kasuwa Mbororo; Tiafarshi / Drigimi Pri. Sch.; Ung. Ardo Hantifa / Kofar Ardo Hantifa; Ung. Ardo / Liddle Pri. Sch.
Michika	Moda / Dlaka / Ghenjuwa	Damago / Kofar Bulama; Hudzukwi Pri. School; Jauro Salihu / Moda Pri. Sch.; Kwadiri / Kwadir Pri. Sch.; Ung. Ardo Tari Yawa / Kofar Ardo Tari Yawa; Ung. Ardo Tari Yawa / Kofar Bulama Kide; Wajara Ndawa I / Barki Dlaka Pri. Sch. I; Wajara Ndawa II / Barki Dlaka Pri. Sch. II
Michika	Munkavicita	Dzugwalde P/Pali - Kofar Bulama; Kule Mbule / Nkafamiya Pri. Sch.; Mrazhiwe / Kofar Bulama; Patha / Patha Pri. Sch.; Zilli Hante / Kofar Bulama
Michika	Sina / Kamale / Kwande	Ghumtupe / Kofar Bulama; Hufuki / Kofar Bulama; Kamalgu Pri. Sch.; Kilanga / Kofar Bulama; Nyiburi Pri. School; Sina Gali Pri. School; Sinamala / Bizi / Bizi Sabo Pri. Sch.; Tadaha / Ung. Bulama; Ung. Ardo / Ung. Ardo; Wafungo / Kwatsuba / Sinakwande Pri. Sch.; Whate / Whate Pri. Sch.; Wuro Boki / Wuro Boki Pri. Sch.; Wuro Nanga / Kasuwa Sina
Michika	Thukudou / Sufuku / Zah	Buppa / Kofar Bulama; Buppa Drisha / Kofar Bulama; Drishi / Ung. Bulama; Kalu Kasa / Kofar Bulama; Kalu Kazzhiwa / Kofar Bulama; Mitama Tsala / Kofar Bulama; Mitsa / Kofar Bulama Bitrus Zira; Muhale / Kulange - Kofar Bulama; Mungaba / Kofar Bulama; Mutana Mugha; Zah Gappa / Kofar Bulama; Zah Gretia / Zah Gretia Pri. Sch.; Zah Kure / Karaza - Kofar Bulama; Zah Lagu / Zahmugha Pri. Sch.
Michika	Sukumu / Tillijo	Delchim/ Delchim Pri. Sch.; Kudzum / Kudzum Pri. Sch.; Kasuwa Lughu; Mija / Kofar Bulama; Pa Kwada / Kofar Bulama; Shafa / Shafa Pri. Sch.; Tsukumu / Tilijo / Tsukumu Pri. Sch.; Tsukumu I / Demo Pri. Sch.; Wamu / Kriya / Wamu Pri. Sch.; Whabozhi / Whabozhi Pri. Sch.; Watsila Pri. Sch.
Michika	Tumbara / Ngabili	Juje / Kofar Bulama; Kwabapale / Kwabapale Pri. Sch.; Kwanbadia / Kasuwa Kuturu; Villegwa / Villegwa Pri. Sch
Michika	VI / Boka	Dagawa I/ Ung. Bulama Dagawa I; Dagawa II/ Ung. Bulama Dagawa II; Hyala Mughala / Ung. Bulama; Kachinkala / Kaltha - Ung. Bulama; Shike Gabas / Ung. Bulama; Tisa / Ung. Bulama; Ung. Ardo Boka / Kofar Ardo Boka; Ung. Ardo VI / Ung. Ardo VI
Michika	Wamblimi / Tilli	Mbunte / Ung. Bulama; Mushinte Kasuwa Naira; Sabon Baku / Kofar Bulama; Sabon Dave Kofar Bulama; Sabon Wanjeje Kofar Bulama; Tili Miya / Tili Pri. Sch.; Yamwe /Khourvi Pri. Sch.
Mubi North	Bahuli	Guranga Pri. Sch./ Guranga; Kofar Jauro Balaya/ Duga; Kofar Jauro Girlahwa/ Girlahwa; Kofar Jauro Guri/ Guri; Kofar Jauro Hayatu/ Nduku; Kofar Jauro M. T. Mara/ M. T. Mara; Kofar Jauro Mbiduwa/ Mbiduwa; Kofar Jauro Wafango / Wafango; Kofar Jauro Tsemo/ Tsemo; Kofar Jauro Tsema/ Girmanjara; Maduguva Pri. Sch./ Maduguva; R C M/ Boitsama
Mubi North	Betso	Bakin Kasuwa/ Bakin Kasuwa I; Bakin Kasuwa/ Bakin Kasuwa II; Betso Dispensary/ Mashodi; Betso Pri. Sch./ Betso Mango; Girpa/ Girpa; Hosere/ Hosere; Jauro S./ Layi/ Sabon Layi; Kofar Jauro Mageu/ Mageu; Kofar Jauro Kaya/ Kaya; Kwa Pri. Sch./ Kwa; Manzil Pri. Sch./ Manzil; Suzuwa Pri. Sch./ Suzuwa
Mubi North	Digil	Batande/ Batande; Didif Pri. Sch./ Didif; Digil Pri. Sch./ Lesswuro; Hurida Pri. Sch./ Hurida; Kofar Ardo Marafa/ Douwuro; Kofar Jauro Yaza/ Yaza; Muchalare/ Muchalare; Wuro Barka/ Wuro Barka; Wuro Harde Pri. Sch./ Wuro Harde
Mubi North	Kolere	Abdu Mawachi/ Treatment Plant; Kallamu Mahauchi; Kofar Abba Goni/ Kolere Arewa; Kofar Alh. Njidda/ K. Round About; New Kolere Pry Sch I; New Kolere Pry Sch II; Kofar Jauro Garba/ Garba; Under Neem Tree (Open Space) M. Stati; Njidda Yawalla; Gindin Manguro (Open Space ) Sa'Ad Lamorde; W. T. Plant/ Power House
Mubi North	Lokuwa	District Office; Gada Market/ Kasuwa Gada; Kasuwa Rake/ Kofar Kudu; Kofar Aboki/ Alh. Abdu; Kofar J. Musa/ Jauro Musa; Local Govt. G/House; Lokuwa Maternity; Lokuwa I Pri. Sch. I; Lokuwa I Pri. Sch. II; Lokuwa II Pri. Sch. III; Mohammed Kachalla; Mohammed Mana/ Kofar Moh'D; Mubi I Pri. Sch.; Ministry Of Land & Survey/ Garden City; Rest House/ G. R. A.; Shuware/State Low Cost; Shuware G. S. S.; Federal Poly/Sport Centre; Wuro Gude Primary School
Mubi North	Mayo Bani	Giwablam Pry Sch./ Bajaugafu; Jarengol Pri. Sch./ Jarengol; Jauro Kurmi Husara/ Kurmi; Kofar Jauro Didif/ Didif; Kofar Jauro Digire/ Digire; Kofar Jauro Dadigal/ Dadigal; Kofar Jauro Lainde/ Lainde; Kofar Jauro Kotirde Ubare/ Ubare; Kofar Jauro Birma/ Birma Layi; Mayo Bani Pry. Sch./ Bulure; Muva Pry. Sch./ Muva Layi; Tappare Pri. Sch./ Tappare
Mubi North	Mijilu	Dispensary/ Chima Dau; Jambula Pri. Sch./ Jambula; Gazha Market/ Gazha; Jauro Tsanyi/ Tsanyi; Jauro Yakwa/ Yakwa; Kiyya/ Maza I; Kiyya/ Maza II; Kofar Ardo/ Tari; Kofar Jauro/ Kurli; Kofar Jauro/ Kulmi; Kofar Jauro/ Lainde; Kofar Jauro/ Muji; Kofar Jauro/ Mirinyi; Kopali/ Kopali; Kwasikini Pri. Sch./ Kaghi; Miza Pri. Sch./ Hunda; Mukta Pri. Sch./ Dagwatari; Wuduvi Pri. Sch./ Wuduvi
Mubi North	Muchalla	Bagira Pri. Sch./ Guvwamda; Chambal Pri. Sch./ Mandara; Kamuda Pri. Sch./ Kamuda Muvur; Kofar Ardo Buba/ Dangira; New Village Square/ Farapayo; Open Space In Front Of K/Ardo Dirlaya; Kofar Ardo Garba/ Gemowa Garba; Kofar Ardo Girzaka Gurnura; Kofar Ardo Gurnuva/ Gurnuva; Kofar Ardo Kaba/ Kaba; Kofar Jauro Kudiya/ Kudiya; Kofar Jauro Magura/ Magura; Kofar Jauro Madiva/ Madiva; Kofar Jauro Mavura/ Mavura; Kofar Jauro Muji/ Muji; Kofar Jauro Ribawa/ Ribawa; Kofar Mallam Aji; Market Stall/ Taskwa; Maskoka Pri. Sch./ Maskoka; Much Dev. Area Office/ Hutiya Ardo; Mucgal Pri. Sch./ Mabinya; Mitiri Pri. Sch./ Gemoma Maikol; Mitiri Pri. Sch./ Kofar Jauro Isa; Pwagwi Pri. Sch./ Mbulaya
Mubi North	Sabon Layi	Adult Education Centre; Bus Stop/ Station; Gindin Durmi/ Bulure; Islamiya Pri. Sch./ Anguwar Durmi; Anguwan Tasha/Bayan Tsohon Tasha I; Angwuwan Tasha/Bayan Tsohon Tasha II; Kofar Adamu Zakka/ Adamu; Kofar Alhaji Mana/ Alh. Mana I; Kofar Alhaji Mana/ Alh. Mana II; Kofar Alkali Paryel/ Al. Paryel; Kofar Ardi Malaya/ Virde; Kofar Baba Gire / Baba Gire I; Kofar Buba Song/ K. Buba Song; Kofar Dallatu/ Dallatu; Kofar Ishaku/ Ishaku; Kofar Isa Ahmadu/ W. Isa Ahmadu; Kofar Jauro Abba; Kofar Abdu; Kofar Jauro Julde/ Julde; Kofar Jibrilla/ Jibrilla; Kofar Modibbo/ Modibbo Suleiman; Kofar Yakubu/ Yakubu; Yangonjo / Kofar Yangonjo; Sarkin Shanu/ S. Shanu I; Sarkin Shanu/ S. Shanu II; Tobacco Store/ T. Store
Mubi North	Vimtim	Mbamba Pri. Sch./ Mbamba; Bakin Kasuwa/ Lepro; Bule House/ Lira; Duda Pri. Sch./ Duda; Muzuwa/Kofar Jauro Muzuwa; Koma Pry Sch./ Bavige; Kofar Buwangal/ Buwangal; Kofar Jauro/ Bamilla; Vimtim Pri. Sch./ Mararaba
Mubi North	Yelwa	Gadan Jini/ Gadan Jini; Hajiya Yanbiu/ Hajiya Yanbiu; Kochifa Dispensary/ Kochifa; Kofar Adamu Gajere/ Adama Gajere; Kofar Alh. Ibrahim Idirisu/ Alh. Idrisu; Kofar Siddiki/ Siddiki; Kofar Isa Wanzam/ Mobili Station; Kofar Iya Fago/ Wuro Jibir; Kofar Musa Zira/ Musa Zira; Kofar Ismaila/ Ismaila; Kofar Salihu M. B/ Salihu M. B; Kofar Sulei Makeri/ Sule Makeri; Yelwa Pry Sch./ Yelwa; Kofar J. Yusuf/Yusuf; Kofar Moh'D Kaigama/Kaigama; Kofar Umaru Mai/ Umaru Mai; Mallam Sule/High Land Hotel; Near Gidado Shop/Gidado; Tukuban Nama/Bakin Kasuwa; Urban Planning/ Y. Sabon Pegi; Yelwa Court No 3/ Boderel
Mubi South	Dirbishi/Gandira	Dirbishi/Kofar Ardo Dirbishi; Dirbishi/Dirbishi Primary School I; Dirbishi/Dirbishi Primary School II; Gandira/ Gandira Primary School; Kwakwa/ Kofar Jauro Bulus; Magira/ Kofar Jauro Sali; Tumda/ Tumda Pri. Sch.
Mubi South	Duvu/ Chaba/ Girburum	Chaba Fulani/ Near Masallachi; Chaba Fulani/ Kofar Jauro Zubairu; Girburum/ Kofar Jauro Adamu; Guza Guza/ Andaza; Lahwa/ Duvu Pri. Sch.; Lumore/ Near Lumore Market; Rinda/ At Fedeco; Rugumbura/ Kofar Jauro Sa'Idu; Wujalaya/ Near Masallachi
Mubi South	Gella	Lumore/ Near Viewing Centre Gella; Malhwa/ Gella II Pri. Sch.; Mbaga/ Kofar Lawan Jirgina; Kagu'A Kofar Majidadi; Tougore/ Kofar Alh. Sali Nene Gella; Yahuma/ Kofar Bulus Buba
Mubi South	Gude	Gindin Kurna/ Gindin Kurna Wuropatuji; Gyadkwara/ Kofar Ibrahim; Jauro Sa'Adu/ Kofar Jauro Sa'Adu; Kalari/ Kofar Ardo Shehu; Munduva/ Munduva Pri. Sch.; Munduva/ Kofar Jauro Munduva; Ngavahi/ Kofar Alh. Bamanga; Va'Atita/ Kofar Jauro Va'Atita; Wuro Patuji/ Kofar Jauro Madugu; Wuro Patuji/ Wuro Patuji Pri. Sch.
Mubi South	Kwaja	Kinga/ Kinga Pri. Sch.; Kissa/ Kofar Jauro Sa'Idu; Lumore/ Kwaja Pri. Sch.; Maza Koya/ Kofar Jauro Alh. Ahmadu I; Maza Koya/ Kofar Jauro Alh. Ahmadu II; Mburima/ Kofar Wakili Jauro Musa Hammawa; Mizuwa/ Kofar Jauro Hayatu Ardo
Mubi South	Lamorde	Dazala/ Dazala Pri. Sch.; Gaya/ Gaya Gindin Kurna; Gaya/ Gaya Gindin Mongoro; Gi'Ima/ Kofar Jauro Gi'Ima; Gerewol/ Gerewol Pri. Sch.; Gerewol/ Kofar Jauro Arhan Kunu; Jalingo/ Govt. Day Secondary Sch. Lamorde; John Holt/ Kofar Jauro John Holt; Kabang/ Mubi II Pri. Sch. I; Kabang/ Mubi II Pri. Sch. II; Kabang/ Kabang Pri. Sch.; Lamorde/ Gwallem Pri. Sch.; Sabon Pegi/ Sabon Pegi Pri. Sch.; Wuro Hamagu/ Wuro Hamagu Pri. Sch.; Wuro Heso/ Kofar Jauro Wuro Heso
Mubi South	Mujara	Girpara/ Kofar Jauro Ibrahim; Kichiha/ Near Sahuda New Market; Madanya/ Madanya Pri. Sch.; Mbulma/ Mbulma Pri. Sch.; Mujara/ Kofar Jauro Sa'Adu; Ngoba/ Kofar Jauro Ngoba; Pukurwa/ Kofar Jauro Galle; Sahuda/ Sahuda Pri. Sch.; Sahuda Sabon Layi/ Near Custom Barrack; Shimbi/ Mujara Dispensary; Tantila/ Tantila Pri. Sch.; Taski/ Kofar Wodili Buba; Yewa Fulani/ Yewa Pri. Sch.
Mubi South	Mugulbu/ Yadafa	Daja/ Kofar Kaigama Yakubu; Girji/ Kofar Jauro Buba; Lugdira/ Kofar Jauro Mamre; Mbilla/ Kofar Jauro Sa'Adu; Muda/ Muda Pri. Sch. I; Muda/ Muda Pri. Sch. II; Muchami/ Kofar Jauro Sa'Adu; Mugulbu/ Mugulbu Dispensary; Ngabda/ Kofar Jauro Buba
Mubi South	Nassarawo	Fed, State Information/ State Information Office, Near Gen. Hospital Mubi; Gindin Rimi/ Near Former Victory Hotel, Ahmadu Bello Way; Husseini Gombe/ Kofar Husseini Gombe Nassarawo; Husseini Nagge/ Kofar Husseini Nagge Mudang Road; Kasuwan Borkono/ Near Kasuwan Borkono Gella Road; Kofar Goni/ Kofar Alh. Goni, No. 21 Gude Road; Kwacham/ Kwacham Pri. Sch.; Lawyer Istifanus/ Kofar Lawyer Istifanus Mudang Road; Mararaban Fada/ Catholic Church Junction, Ahmadu Bello Way; Musa Ayanke/ Kofar Late Musa Ayanke, No. 10 Fiyel Street; Old Bank Of The North/ No. 30 Sebore Road; Remand Home/ Near Remand Home; Sebore/ Sebore Pri. Sch.; Tashan Gella/ Near Tashan Gella, Gella Road; Tike/ Kofar Mallam Adamu, Behind Cattle Market Mubi; Tike/ Opposite Tike Cattle Market Gate; Wuro Bulude/ Wuro Bulude Pri. Sch.
Mubi South	Nduku	Bajaule/ Kofar Jauro Haziel; Beta/ Kofar Jauro Beta; Dubu Dubu/ Kofar Jauro Dubu Dubu; Kaftara/ Kofar Jauro Kaftara; Kagi'I/ Kagi'I Pri. Sch.; Kwadankin/ Kofar Jauro Kwadankin; Nduku/ Nduku Pri. Sch.; Tsaranyi K/Jauro Tsaranyi
Numan	Bare	Batache/ Kofar Mai Anguwa Peter; Daso/ Pri. Sch.; Gyadang/ Pri. Sch.; Ngyallah/ Kofar Sarki; Sabon Pegi/ Pri. Sch.; Tamu/ Kofar Mai Unguwa Bwalo Rana; Fare/ Kofar J. Othaniel Saulaya; Ubandoma/ Kofar Jauro Umar Ubandoma
Numan	Bolki	Bang/ Bang Pri. Sch.; Bokki/ K. J. Kadah L.; Bolki/ Bolki Pri. Sch. I; Bolki/ Bolki Pri. Sch. II; Gon/ K. J. Istifanus M.; Kegbale/ Kegbale Pri. Sch.; Lawe/ Lawe Pri. Sch.; Nega/ K. J. Nzopurato A.; Nyapuli/ K. J. Ishaya N.; Nzumoso/ Nzumoso Pri. Sch.; Yanga E/ Yanga Pri. Sch.; Yanga E. E / Yanga Pri. Sch.
Numan	Gamadio	Bwei/ Bwei Pri. Sch.; Dandu/ K. J. Daniel Wayamko; Dome/ Gamadio Pri. Sch.; Gamadio/ K. J. Jauro Kaitanga; Hodikakai/ K. J. Iliya Myamugaoron; Kanti/ K. J. Sule Kidda; Kikon/ K. J. Kemuel Kakanda; Tunga Bisa/ Kofar Jauro Fielis Mangyi; Tunga Ladan/ Tunga Pry School
Numan	Imburu	Gindin Gada/ Hayin Gada; Kwapukai/ Kwapukai; Ngbalang Kasuwa/ Ngbalang; Ngbalang Wurkun/ Ngbalang; Ngbangballo/ Zangun C. A. C.; Ngbauro/ Imburu; Rocco Gate/ Ngbalang; Shafan/ Imburu; Vormokye/ Zangon L. C. C. N; Vormokye / Zangon L. C. C. N; Vudekoron/ Imburu
Numan	Kodomti	Bulkun/ Bulkun Pri. Sch.; Byemti/ Byemti Pri. Sch.; Kikan/ K. J. Nzomoto Luwareno; Kulkon/ K. Mai Ang. Mwasaron; Kwahuba/ Kwahuba Pri. Sch.; Nzoruwe/ Nzoruwe Pri. Sch.; Pullum/ K. Jauro Klah Lugaino; Voti Kodomti/ K. Jauro Mr Micheal Munnon; Voti Shaforon/ K. Jauro Zabadi Goma; Vudegbekto/ Kodomti Pri. Sch.
Numan	Numan I	Anguwan Waja/ Numan III Pry School; Bamtato/ K. Mai Ang. Topogbange; N P C Road/ N P C Premises; Sgss/ Gtss/ Sakato G. S. S; Stadium Road/ Makwada Square; Tudun Wada/ Kofar Mallam Ishaya; Unguwar Wurkun/ K. Mai Ang. Hananiya; Vtc, Gss/ V. T. C
Numan	Numan II	Ngbabulang/ Kofar Yamath; Ngbakouto/ Kofar Jauro Somode House; Ngbauro/ Ngbauro; Ngbayofe/ Kofar Baba Sanu; Nokowon/ Nokowon; Nupawa/ Near Chief Orobo's House; Pare Centre/ Pare Pri. Sch.; Youth Centre/ Youth Centre; Zabarma/ Near Liman's House
Numan	Numan III	Fada/ Fada; John Holt/ John Holt; Makera/ Makera; Old Market/ Old Market; Prisons/ Prisons; Unguwar Gangare/ Gangare; Unguwar Sarkin Hausawa/ Hausawa; Upper Area Court/ Upper Area Court
Numan	Sabon Pegi	Barkindo/ K. Mai Ang. Madugu; Dowaya/ K. Jauro Umar; G. R. A./ G. R. A Quarters; Graceland/ Kofar Babandiya; Gweda Mallam/ Gweda Mallam Pri. Sch. I; Gweda Mallam/ Gweda Mallam Pri. Sch. II; Gwoza Road/ Unguwan Musa; Home Economics/ Home Economics Dept.; Massallaci/ Kofar Victor Smith; Unguwan Ali/ K. Audu Mai Karfe
Numan	Vulpi	Bangwe/ K. J Bli Furema; Bokotye/ K. J Esthon Ndugo; Bonanga/ Kofar J. Bitrus; Gbalapun/ Gbalapun Pri. Sch.; Gyemun/ K. J Edward Sakto; Kwagoro/ Kwangoro Pri. Sch; Ngwalti/ K. J Halilu; Salti/ Salti Pri. Sch.; Vulpi/ Vulpi Pri. Sch.; Vulpi/ Kwahanogwe
Shelleng	Bakta	Babra/ Kofar Jauro Kula; Bakta/ Kula Pri. Sch.; Deben/ Deben Pri. Sch.; Unguwan Gede/ Kofar Jauro Gede; Jekinda/ Kofar Jauro
Shelleng	Bodwai	Bodwai/ Bodwai Pri. Sch. I; Bodwai/ Bodwai Pri. Sch. II; Bolama/ Bolama Pri. Sch. III; Dalwa/ Dalwa Pri. Sch.; Jalingo Biki/ Jalingo Pri. Sch.; Riwi Riwi/ Riwi Riwi Pri. Sch.; Tanga/ Gwakla Pri. Sch.; Tongra, Goroshi/ Kofar Buntumai; Ung. Kasuwa/ In Front Of Bodwai Market
Shelleng	Gundo	Ajiya/ Kofar Jauro Ajiya; Bobere/ Bobere Dispensary; Daso/ Daso Pri. Sch.; Gundo/ Gundo Pri. Sch.; Kem/ Kem Pri. Sch.; Lababiri/ Kasuwan Dare; Tudun Kem/ Kofar Jauro Golo; Tudun Kem/ Tudun Market; Yerimajo/ Kofar Jauro
Shelleng	Gwapopolok	Bangda/ Kofar Jauro; Gorum/ Nafada Pri. Sch.; Gwapopolok/ Gwapopolok Pri. Sch.; Karlaje/ Kofar Modibbo; Karlaje/ Karlaje Pri. Sch.; Kongma/ Kongma Pri. Sch.
Shelleng	Jumbul	Bira Bira/ Bira Bira Pri. Sch.; Jamali/ Jamali Pri. Sch.; Jonkolo Jamri/ Jonkolo Pri. Sch.; Jumbul, Wama / Boburo Pri. Sch.; Gombeyel/ Kofar Jauro; Gombeyel/ Tashan Gombeyel; Kula Kasa/ Kula Pri. Sch.; Sadiq Buba/ Kofar Jauro
Shelleng	Ketembere	Barata/ Barata Pri. Sch.; Bura Bello/ Kofar Kuna Buba; Gondong/ Gondong Pri. Sch.; Gukuri/ Gukuri Pri. Sch.; Jihadi/ Kofar Jauro; Ketembere/ Ketembere Pri. Sch.; Laba'U/ Laba'U Pri. Sch.
Shelleng	Kiri	Bopalda/ Opp. Police Post; Kiri/ Kiri Pri. Sch.; Lajirmi/ Govt. Rest House; Nasarawo Wuro/ Kofar Mai Anguwa; Sabon Pegi/ Dev. Area Office; Ung. Talum/ Kofar Maiunguwa
Shelleng	Libbo	Dumburi/ Kofar Jauro; Gargijik/ Kofar Jauro; Kambilam/ Kambilam Pri. Sch.; Libbo/ Libbo Pri. Sch. I; Libbo/ Libbo Pri. Sch. II; Wuro Yanka/ Wuro Yanka Pri. Sch. I; Wuro Yanka/ Wuro Yanka Pri. Sch. II; Wuro Yanka/ Bakin Kasuwa
Shelleng	Shelleng	Amna/ Amna's Palace; Amna/ Kofar Wakili Yidak; Amna/ Dispensary; Awa/ Kofar Maianguwa; Awa/ Motor Park; Bokayeki/ Kofar Jauro; Gwaila/ G. S. S Assembly G.; Kambari/ Kofar Maina; Lajirmi Kasuwan Dare; Sabon Pegi/ Education Dept.; Shelleng/ Shelleng Pri. Sch.; Tashan Bodwai/ Tashan Bodwai; Tetek/ Tetek Pri. Sch.; Ung. Titus/ Min. Of Agric
Shelleng	Tallum	Gwagarap/ Gwagarap Pri. Sch.; Kula Dutse/ Kofar Jauro Kula; Lainde Dama/ Kofar Jauro; Tallum/ Tallum Pri. Sch.; Tsohon Gwagarap/ Kofar Mai Unguwa; Wuro Ladde/ Motor Park
Song	Dirma	Bapta/ Bapta; Batum Pri. Sch.; Batum Sumsuma; Botta / Botta; Bwadai; Bwara; Dolon; Dombi; G. D. S. S Dirma I; G. D. S. S Dirma II; Kah; Koti Tanda; M/ Koti; Shiure Dispensary; Simko; Simlatin; Tinde Laru I; Tinde Laru II; Tinde Mbwai
Song	Dumne	Bakka; Bodoma; Dimdima; Dumne B Pri. Sch.; Golla; Hombo Pri. Sch.; Hombo Kasita; Kasuwa; Kofar Jauro; K. Wakili Bauna; Kogi; Malero; Pella; Pulle Yanka; Sangra; Shilon Pri. Sch.; Simra; Tasha; Walkisha
Song	Gudu Mboi	Bradeng/ Bradeng; Garin Tuwo; Gudu Pri. Sch.; Handa Pri. Sch.; K. Banga Pri. Sch.; Kofar J. Ahmadu; Maborgal; Sintire; Tumpa
Song	Kilange Funa	Ardo Muazu; Damare; Gola Fulani; Gola Usman; Kofar Ardo; Koribu; Muri Manda; Sabon Gari; Walowol; Wuro Babba; Wuro Badiddi; Wuro Buba; Wuro Mallum; Zumore
Song	Kilange Hirna	Boloko; Dallol; Geledi; Geleng I(Open Square); Geleng II(Open Square); Kanawa; Kungo; Tasu Hausa; Wuro Daudu
Song	Sigire	Chibawuro; Golare; Golontobal; Gulungo; Kesure; Kofar Ardo; Sigire; Sigire Gadamayo
Song	Suktu	Ang. Jauro; Balma; Bariki; Gbawe; Jimbo Fulani; Jimbo Tadi; Kuma Pri. Sch; Kumle Sokoron; Kwadango; Maseno; Mbai; Leti Gben; Roma Church; Salasa Pri. Sch.; Suktu Pri. Sch.; Suktu Satte; Zabna; Zata Ang. Jauro; Zata Batodo
Song	Song Gari	Atiku Pri. Sch.; Babal K. Sarki; Bichel I Kofar Jauro; Bichel II(Open Square); Bolki Pri. Sch.; Clinic A; Clinic B; Dadinkowa Hausawa; Dadinkowa J. Aminu; Dauchi; Fulani Mbalyebbe; Hayin Gada Loko; Hokkata; Kaulara; Kitchiu; Kofar Abduwa; Kofar Modibbo; K. J Saidu; K. J Umaru; Mbilla; Prof. J. A Pri. Sch.; Sabon Loko; Sawin; Viewing Centre; V. T. C Song
Song	Song Waje	Babal; Burtum; Didango; Galamba; Gewan Pri. Sch.; Kofar Ardo Murke II; Kofar Mairiga; Mudungo; Muleng Kuro; Sayejo; Wuro Koncha; Wuro Lainde I; Wuro Lainde II
Song	Waltandi	Babra; Dabal; Dikir Pri. Sch.; Gangane; Garkijik; Gbanglangra; Gora; Kipiro; Kukta Pri. Sch.; Prambe Pri. Sch.; Sakida; Sau Biri; Sebulur; Waltadi Pri. Sch.
Song	Zumo	Baduware; Chalawa; Karallahi; Karewa; Kolere I; Kolere II; Labbare; Labbare/ K. J. Wambai; Lamorde; Mayel Kewe; Mayo Ngalbiwa
Toungo	Dawo I	Bonen Danki / Kofar Jauro Bonen Danki; Bonen Koko / Kofar Jauro Bonen Koko; Gangsen I/ Kofar Jauro G/Seni; Gangtaren Wasi / Kofar Jauro G/Wasi; Gangwaren / Kofar Jauro G/Waren; Gidan Biri / Kofar Jauro G/Biri; Jangla / Kofar Jauro Jangla; Timbuang / Kofar Jauro Timbuang; Timkei / Kofar Jauro Timkei
Toungo	Dawo II	Daka Laje / Kofar Jauro Daka Laje; Dalumen/ Kofar Jauro Dalumen; Dottiwa/ Kofar Jauro Dottiwa; Gajere Timwo/ Kofar Jauro G/Timwo; Gakseum/ Kofar Jauro Gakseum; Mayo Baji/ Kofar Jauro Mayo Baji; Mayo Duken/ Kofar Jauro M/Duken; Mayo Vem/ Kofar Jauro M/Vem; Mikusum/ Kofar Jauro Mikusum; Waziri/ Kofar Jauro Waziri
Toungo	Gumti	Bodel/ Kofar Jauro Bodel; Deujiman/ Kofar Jauro Deujiman; Deutipsan/ Kofar Jauro Deutipsan; Deutipsan Mumuye/ Kofar Jauro D. T. Mumuye; Deuyemti/ Kofar Jauro Deuyemti; Gum/ Kofar Jauro Gum; Gumti/ Gumti Pri. Sch.; Luggere Bana/ Kofar Jauro L/Bana; Tapare/ Kofar Jauro Tapare
Toungo	Kiri I	Binaka/ Kofar Jauro Binaka; Dalasum/ Dalasum Pri. School; Dasiso/ Kofar Jauro Dasiso; Dayam/ Kofar Jauro Dayam; Jauro Laweso/ Kofar Jauro Laweso; Kiri Petel/ District Office Kiri; Kiri Petel/ Kiri Pri. Sch.; Mayo Loru/ Dukudu Pri. Sch.; Mentani/ Mentani Pri. Sch.; Unguwan Hausa/ Kofar Jauro U/Hausa
Toungo	Kiri II	Dakeu/ Kofar Jauro Dakeu; Jiji/ Kofar Jauro Jiji; Kila Jubseri/ Kila Jubseri Pri. Sch.; Makama/ Timbukun Pri. Sch.; Taksi Ganten/ Kofar Jauro Taksi; Timbo/ Timbo Pri. Sch.; Timbo/ Kofar Jauro Timbo; Timgbu/ Timgbu Pri. Sch.
Toungo	Kongin Baba I	Gassanopi/ Kofar Maiunguwa; Jiman/ Kofar Maiunguwa; Kogin Baba/ Kogin Baba Pri. Sch.; Lawan Konti/ Kofar Maiunguwa; Songoli/ Kofar Maiunguwa
Toungo	Kongin Baba II	Danbara/ Kofar Jauro; Gangwaren/ Kofar Jauro; Hore Yiwa/ Kofar Jauro; Kenna/ Kofar Jauro; Yakpen/ Kofar Jauro
Toungo	Toungo I	Barade/ Toungo Main Market; Barade/ Toungo Motor Park; Barade/ Kofar Jauro Barade; Barade/ Kofar Jauro Barade Opp. Well; Garba Chamba/ G. S. S Toungo; Garba Chamba/ Toungo II Pri. Sch.; Mayo Sangnare/ Kofar Jauro M/Sangnare
Toungo	Toungo II	Lainde Chitta/ Lainde Chitta Pri. Sch.; Mayo Bakari/ Kofar Jauro M/Bakari; Mayo Butali/ Kofar Jauro M/Butali; Mayo Gbagbag/ Mayo Gbagbag Pri. Sch.; Mayo Sumsum/ Kofar Jauro M/Sumsum; Yerima Isa/ District Office Toungo; Yerima Isa/ Opp. Area Court Office; Yerima Isa/ Local Govt. Secretariat
Toungo	Toungo III	Gangzamanu/ Gangzamanu Pri. Sch.; Gangzamanu/ Kofar Jauro; Gangsoren/ Kofar Mai Anguwa; Jangawe Babale/ Nawai Pri. Sch.; Lawan Daka/ Kofar Maiunguwa; Madaki Chacha/ Kofar Maiunguwa Mayo Chacha; Nadu/ Nadu Pri. Sch.; Wambai Taksi/ Kofar Maiunguwa W/Taksi; Yeliso/ Kofar Jauro Yeliso
Yola North	Alkalawa	Alkali Mokolo / 81 Kurmi Road; Alhaji Musa / 100 Majalisa Road; Baba Salma / No 6 Mokolo Close; Bobboi Wanzam / No 7 Nepa Road; Gra Pri. Sch. Infront Of H/M's Office; Gra Pri. Sch. Infront Of Class II; Gra Pri. Sch. Infront Of Class VI; Gra Pri. Sch. Infront Of Class Ivb; Isa Rumingo / 22 Ganye St; Kofar Ma'Aji / 16 Maalisa Rd; Kofar Moh'D Kiri / 48 Kurmi Rd.; Kofar Moh'D Zubairu / 79 Nepa Rd.; Kofar Jama'A / 25 Ibadan St.; Kofar Sarkin Tasha / 7 Taraba St.; Kofar Suleiman S/Kasuwa - 46 Tafida Rd; Kofar Siddiki / 35 Ganye Street
Yola North	Ajiya	Alh. Buba Jalo / 5 Abeokuta St; Alh. Jalo / No 2 Jen Close; Ajiya Clinic Opp. Ajiya Clinic; Bubakari Maigari / 1, Kaduna St.; Central Pri. Sch. /Central Pri. Sch. I; Central Pri. Sch. /Central Pri. Sch. II; Central Pri. Sch. /Central Pri. Sch. III; Central Pri. Sch. /Central Pri. Sch. IV; Central Pri. Sch. /Central Pri. Sch. V; Kofar Gana / No 9 Ndaforo St.; Kofar Nabara / 120 Nepa Rd.; Opp. Cp's House / 14 Ibrahim Attah Rd. Kofar gidan Mallam garba No82 nepa road
Yola North	Doubeli	Benin St. / No 16 Benin St; Capital Sch. / Capital Sch. I; Capital Sch. / Capital Sch. II; Capital Sch. / Capital Sch. III; Capital Sch. / Capital Sch. IV; Capital Sch. / Capital Sch. V; Demsawo Pri. Sch. / Demsawo Pri. Sch. I; Demsawo Pri. Sch. / Demsawo Pri. Sch. II; Demsawo Pri. Sch. / Demsawo Pri. Sch. III; Demsawo Pri. Sch. / Demsawo Pri. Sch. IV; Doubeli Gdss / Doubeli Gdss I; Doubeli Gdss / Doubeli Gdss II; Doubeli Gdss / Doubeli Gdss III; Ganiyu Alh. / 14 Demsawo St.; Gindin Goruba / 127 Bye - Pass; Jalo Alh. / No 50, Geriyo St.; Maiunguwa Moh'D / 5 Warwar St.; Mohammed Shuwa / Opp Geriyo St.; Musa Gobe / 3 Benin Street; Musa Karim Lamido / 5 Karim St.; Mijinyawa Yuguda / Opp Cattle Mkt; Sansani / Off Mambila St.
Yola North	Gwadabawa	Command Pri. Sch. / Command Pri. Sch.; Ghali Mu'Azu/ 95 Tafida Rd; Gwadabawa Pri. Sch. / Gwadabawa Pri. Sch. I; Gwadabawa Pri. Sch. / Gwadabawa Pri. Sch. II; Gwadabawa Pri. Sch. / Gwadabawa Pri. Sch. III; Gwadabawa Pri. Sch. / Gwadabawa Pri. Sch. IV; Majalisa Pri Sch. / Majalisa Pri. Sch. I; Majalisa Pri Sch. / Majalisa Pri. Sch. II; New Govt. House / Opp Main Gate; New Govt. House / G. G. S. S. Main Gate; New Govt. House / Near Police Post I; New Govt. House / Near Police Post II; New Fce Staff Sch. / Staff School; Old Govt. House / Opp Main Gate; Old Govt. House / Behind Ribadu Square; Units Of 80 Houses / Opp Ndlea; Yola Club / No 1 Adamawa Rd.
Yola North	Jambutu	Damilu Pri. Sch. / Damilu Pri. Sch. I; Damilu Pri. Sch. / Damilu Pri. Sch. II; Jambutu Pri. Sch. / Jambutu Pri. Sch I.; Jambutu Pri. Sch. / Jambutu Pri. Sch II.; Kofar Audu Damilu/ Kofar Jauro; Kofar Jauro Audu Maiwada; Kofar Hamza/ No 166 Jambutu; Kofar Jauro Jambutu/ Kofar Jauro; Kofar J/Nyokere/Kofar/ Nyokere; Kofar Yerima/Opp Jambutu Estate
Yola North	Karewa	Bachure/ Kofar Jauro Bachure I; Bachure/ Kofar Jauro Bachure II; Bekaji Pri. Sch I; Bekaji Pri. Sch. II; Gdss (Army) Staff Qtrs. I; Gdss (Army) Staff Qtrs. II; Gdss (Army) Staff Qtrs. III; Gdss (Army) Staff Qtrs. IV; Karewa Gdss I; Karewa Gdss II; Karewa Pri. Sch. I; Karewa Pri. Sch. II; Kofare/ Kofar Jauro Kofare; Malamre Market; Malamre Qtrs/ Kofar Suleiman Wapanda; Nyibango/ Kofar Jauro Nyibango; State Poly I; State Poly II; State Poly III
Yola North	Limawa	Alh Garba/ 50 Zango St.; Buba Manda/ 46 Zango St.; Dasin Mai Riga; Isa Isawa/ 31 S/Wuta St.; Jauro Hairu/ Off M/Belwa St.; Kofar Alh. Abdulrahman/ Off Mayanka St.; Kofar Audu Maiyadi/ Off M/Belwa St.; Paris Hammanjoda/ 217 M/Mustapha; Sabo B. Dako/ 22 Yelwa St.; Sani Rabo/ 25 Yelwa St.; Sununnu/ 1 Mayanka St.; Zango Rd/ 90 Zango Rd; Zango Rd/ 50 Zango Rd I; Zango Rd/ 50 Zango Rd II
Yola North	Luggere	Diwaki/ No. 6 Gimba Rd; Kadiri Tela/ 37 Catholic St.; Luggere Pri. Sch. I; Luggere Pri. Sch. II; Luggere Pri. Sch III; Luggere Pri. Sch. IV; Luggere Pri. Sch. V; M. Madu/ 21 Owerri St.; Maiunguwa Musa/ 60 B. Hungushi Rd; Manu Gamji/ 54 Bishop St.; Mallam H. Dampah/ Off Bishop St.; Madalla Chemist/ 14 Bishop St.; Yahya Moda/ 23 Muri St.; Yahya Tela/ 28 Bishop St.
Yola North	Rumde	Kofar Alh. Goda/ 68 Taraba St.; Kofar Liman Rumde/ 33 Church St.; Kofar M. Hammawa/ 15 Church St.; Kofar Mai Itache/ 67 Church St.; Kofar Mai Lawuje/ 63 Fombina St.; Kofar Wakili Dahiru/ 61 Fombina St.; Kofar Moh'D Dahiru (Wuro Kuturu); Rumde Pri. Sch. I; Rumde Pri. Sch. II; Rumde Pri. Sch. III
Yola South	Adarawo	Kofar Jauro Mandarare/ Near Lamido's Farm; Kofar Jauro Manga/ Njoboliyo Road; Kofar Jauro Wuro Chekke/ Near U. B. R. B. D. A. Yola; Kofar Mai Anguwa Dahiru/ Kilanyi St. W/Hausa; Kofar Mai Anguwa Uwaisu/ Near TV Viewing Centre; Kofar Yahya Tobacco/ Wuro Hausa Ward Yola; T. V. Viewing Centre/ Wuro Hausa Ward Yola; Wuro Hausa Dispensary/ Wuro Hausa Ward Yola; Wuro Hausa Pri. Sch./ Wuro Hausa Ward Yola I; Wuro Hausa Pri. Sch./ Wuro Hausa Ward Yola II; Wuro Hausa Pri. Sch./ Wuro Hausa Ward Yola III
Yola South	Bako	Bako Pri. Sch./ Off Modibbo Adama Way Yola IV; Bako Pri. Sch./ Off Modibbo Adama Way Yola V; Bako Pri. Sch./ Off Modibbo Adama Way Yola VI; Bako Pri. Sch./ Off Modibbo Adama Way Yola VII; Kofar Alh. Jauro/ Chiroma Road; Kofar Grand Khadi/ Off Modibbo Adama Way; Kofar Waziri/ Off Modibbo Adama Way; Mustafa Pri. Sch./ Modibbo Adama Way I; Mustafa Pri. Sch./ Modibbo Adama Way II; Mustafa Pri. Sch./ Modibbo Adama Way III; Yelwa Govt. Sec. Sch./ Off Modibbo Adama Way
Yola South	Bole Yolde Pate	Bole II Pri. Sch./ After Shagari Lowcost; Gindin Gamji/ Shagari Pri. School; Kofar Jauro Bole I/ After Shagari Lowcost; Kofar Jauro Douchechi/ After Shagari Lowcost; Kofar Jauro Gujubabu/ Along Yadim Road; Kofar Jauro Njaccingo/ Along Mayo Ine Road; Kofar Jauro Wuro Addayel/ Along Yadim Road; Kofar Jauro Yolde Pate/ Along Yadim Road; Shagari Dispensary/ Shagari Phase I. I; Shagari Dispensary/ Shagari Phase I. II; Shagari Dispensary/ Shagari Phase I. III; Shagari Govt. Day Sec. Sch./ Shagari Phase I; Tc Demonstration Pri. Sch./ Near T. C Yola; Yolde Pate Pri. Sch./ Along Yadim Road
Yola South	Namtari	Changala Pri. Sch./ Changala Village; Kofar Jauro Boggare/ Boggare Village; Kofar Jauro Doulabi/ After Namtari Manga; Kofar Jauro Ndumga/ After Army Barracks; Kofar Jauro Ngolomba/ Ngolomba Village; Kofar Jauro Sangere Bode/ Near N. T. A Transmitter Numan Road; Kofar Jauro Rumde Kila/ After Army Barracks; Kofar Jauro Wauro Jabbe/ Near Tractor Hiring Unit; Malkohi Pri. Sch./ After Army Barracks; Namtari Gurel Pri. Sch./ Off Numan Road. I; Namtari Gurel Pri. Sch./ Off Numan Road. II; Namtari Manga Pri. Sch./ Off Numan Road. III; Namtari Manga Pri. Sch./ Off Numan Road. IV; Wauru Jabbe Pri. Sch./ Near Tractor Hiring Unit; Wuro Dadi Pri. Sch./ Wuro Dadi Village
Yola South	Ngurore	Goduwo Pri. Sch./ Goduwo Village; Kofar Ardo Wuro Yanka/ Near Ngurore Market; Kofar Bello Wurkum/ Near Ngurore Market; Kofar Chiroma/ Near Police Station; Kofar Elisha Mbula/ Anguwan Yandang; Kofar Haruna/ Goduwo Road; Kofar Jauro Falire/ Along Goduwo Road; Kofar Jauro Konankuka/ Eastern Part Of Ngurore; Kofar Jauro Mboi/ Off Goduwo Road; Kofar Jauro Sabon Gari/ Along Goduwo Road; Kofar Mai Anguwa Nassarawo/ Nassarawo Ward Ngurore; Kofar Mai Anguwa Toungo/ Toungo Ward Ngurore; Kofar Salihu Banenne/ Anguwan Yandang; Kulangu Pri. Sch./ Along Goduwo Road. I; Langire Pri. Sch./ Along Goduwo Road. II; Ngurore Pri. Sch./ Ngurore Pri. Sch.; T. V. Viewing Centre/ Near Pri. Sch.; Wuro Yanka Pri. Sch./ Wuro Yanka Ward
Yola South	Makama 'A'	Damare Pri. Sch./ Damare Ward Yola. I; Damare Pri. Sch./ Damare Ward Yola. II; Damare Pri. Sch./ Damare Ward Yola. III; Kofar Baba Audu/ Abuja Road Near Yerima's House; Kofar Bamanga Yahya/ Shehu Street; Kofar Bayi/ Eastern Lamido's Palace. I; Kofar Bayi/ Eastern Lamido's Palace. II; Kofar Khadi Bamanga/ Shehu Street; Kofar Mai Mandara/ Abuja Road; Kofar Modibbo Girei/ After Kofar Bayi; Kofar Modibbo Zelani/ Near Modibbo Zelani Mosque; Kofar Umaru Kila/ Damare Ward; Kofar Umaru Ngaudere/ Near Damare Police Station; Yelwa Pri. Sch./ After Yerima's House
Yola South	Makama 'B'	Civil Area Court/ Near Education Dept Yola; Fattude Girei Pri. Sch./ Abuja Road Yola; Kofar Baba Abba/ Abuja Road Yola; Kofar Baba Bature/ Yerima Street Yola; Kofar Baraya/ Abuja Road Yola; Kofar Wakili Office/ Off Sanda Road; Kofar Wali Abba/ Wali Ward Yola; Sanda Pri. Sch./ Off Abuja Road. I; Sanda Pri. Sch./ Off Abuja Road. II; Sanda Pri. Sch./ Off Abuja Road; T. V Viewing Centre/ Near Education Dept
Yola South	Mbamba	Kofar Jauro Kofare/ Off Fufore Road; Kofar Jauro Rumde Jabbi/ Opp Upper Benue; Kofar Jauro Sarki Jikir/ Opp Mbamba Kona; Kofar Jauro Wurkum/ Along Fufore Road; Kofar Lawan Sebore/ Off Fufore Road By Right; Mbamba Dispensary/ Along Fufore Road; Njoboli Pri. Sch./ Off Fufore Road. I; Njoboliyo Pri. Sch./ Off Fufore Road. II; Njoboliyo Pri. Sch./ Off Fufore Road By Leg; Rugange Pri. Sch./ After Njoboliyo. I; Rugange Pri. Sch./ After Njoboliyo. II; T. V Viewing Centre Njoboli/ Off Fufore Road; Upper Benue Pri. Sch./ Along Fufore Road
Yola South	Mbamoi	Kofar Ahmadu Danburam/ Off Sokoto St. Junction By The Left; Kofar Ahmadu Duwa/ Off Ladan Street; Kofar Ahmadu Wambai/ Kofar Ahmadu Wambai; Kofar Galadima/ Galadima Ward Yola; Kofar Magatakarda/ Ladan Street Yola; Kofar Mahmudu Ribadu/ Off Chiroma Road; Kofar Umaru Babban Mofti/ Mbamoi Ward Yola; Kofar Wali Dahiru/ Mbamoi Ward Yola. I; Kofar Wali Dahiru/ Mbamoi Ward Yola. II; Kofar Yamma/ Near Lamido's Palace
Yola South	Toungo	Govt. Day Sec. Sch/ Near Yola Motor Park. I; Govt. Day Sec. Sch/ Near Yola Motor Park. II; Govt. Day Sec. Sch/ Near Yola Motor Park. III; Hammawa Pri. Sch./ Madaki Junction Yola. IV; Hammawa Pri. Sch./ Madaki Junction Yola. V; Hammawa Pri. Sch./ Madaki Junction Yola. VI; Kofar Baba Mustafa/ Near A. Y. T Petrol Station; Kofar Wakili Asibiti/ Behind Yola Market; Toungo Pri. Sch./ Madaki Street Junction. I; Toungo Pri. Sch./ Madaki Street Junction. II
Yola South	Yolde Kohi	Dingali Pri. Sch./ Off Mayo - Belwa Road; Gongoshi Dispensary/ In Gongoshi Village; Gongoshi Pri. Sch./ In Gongoshi Village; Hosere Dispensary./ Off Numan Road; Hosere Pri. Sch./ Off Numan Road; Kofar Jauro Dubire/ Off Mayo Belwa Road; Kofar Jauro Ibbare/ Mayo Belwa Road; Kofar Jauro Mallam Musa/ Off Mayo Belwa Road; Kofar Jauro Ngasaga/ Numan Road; Kofar Jauro Tabra/ Off Mayo Belwa Road; Sabana Pri. Sch./ Along Numan Road; Yolde Kohi Pri. Sch./ Along Mayo - Belwa Road
