= Shuwa =

Shuwa may mean

- Shuwa Arabic, the Afro-Arabic language spoken in Sudan, Chad and other states of Sahelian Africa
  - The mostly Arab speakers of the language also known as Baggara
- The Japanese Sign Language (手話)
- Honinbo Shuwa, a Japanese professional go player
- Shuwaa, a roasted goat or lamb dish popular in Oman and the UAE
- Shuwa Madagali, District town of Madagali in Adamawa State
