= Gambe =

- Village
- Interactive map of Gambe
- Country: Nigeria
- State: Adamawa
- Local government area: Mayo-Belwa
- District: Tola-Binyeri

Gambe is a village in Tola-Binyeri District of the Mayo-Belwa local government area of Adamawa State in north east Nigeria.

The settlement was founded c.1750 by Gangve, the first Chief of Gambe.

Gambe is in Gangfada Ward. Gambe has six of the twelve polling units in the ward. It is headed by the Traditional Council Village Head under the leadership of the District Head at Tola Headquarters of Tola-Binyeri District.

== Geography ==
Gambe is an ancient settlement located on the northern fringes of the Sebshi Mountain ranges in Adamawa State of Nigeria. The village is located near the confluence of River 'Jara' and River 'Boghdu'. The now merged rivers pass through places like Baleri Noppi, Pola, etc. the river is a tributary of the Benue River. The originally spring waters flow from the mountain peaks down to Gambe at the foot of the mountain were the two rivers meet before flowing Northwards to the Benue River through Ngurore town in Yola south. The upper part of the village is located at the top of plateau of the mountain called Chabbal Donkin it is located near the border with Bali LG, Taraba State. The town of Daka in Bali, Taraba state share the same ancestral history as Gambe.

== Agriculture ==
The village is mostly settled by small scale farmers who grow crops such as groundnuts, Irish potatoes, pear, mango, palm kernels, mountain honey, and atile. The main market day is every Saturday; local produce and manufactured goods are sold.

== Natural resources ==
Gambe village contains a variety of solid minerals including barite, agate, raw gold dust, quartz, diamond, blue sapphire, ruby, emerald, lead, tourmaline and fossils.

== Inhabitants ==
Gambe is the home to the Chamba people, a tribe in Nigeria's North East region. It is also the village of the first Chamba University graduate: Sa'adu Abubakar Gambe. He graduated from Provincial Secondary School Yola in 1964, he did HSC in Science School Lagos, he then studied Botany/Zoology Combined Honors in Ahmadu Bello University Zaria. He is known as 'Baba Gambe' Father of Gambe.

The village has a Primary School and a Junior Secondary School.
