= Mugulbu =

- Interactive map of Mugulbu
- Coordinates: 10.200002°N 13.223333°E

Mugulbu is a village also politically known as Development area few kilometres to Mubi, the village is surrounded with some Small villages of Muda, Mbilla, Parnyel, Buladega and Muchami.
