= Shuwa Madagali =

Shuwa Shuwa Madagali
- town
- Location within Nigeria
- Coordinates: 10°44′49″N 13°24′57″E
- Country: Nigeria
- State: Adamawa State
- Time zone: UTC+1 (WAT)

Shuwa, or Shuwa Madagali, is a town in Madagali, Adamawa State, Nigeria.
