= 2023 Nigerian Senate elections in Adamawa State =

2023 Senate elections in Adamawa

2019 Nigerian Senate elections in Adamawa State
- 25 February 2023

All 3 Adamawa State seats in the Senate of Nigeria
	Majority party	Minority party
Party	APC	PDP
Last election	1	2
Seats before	2	1
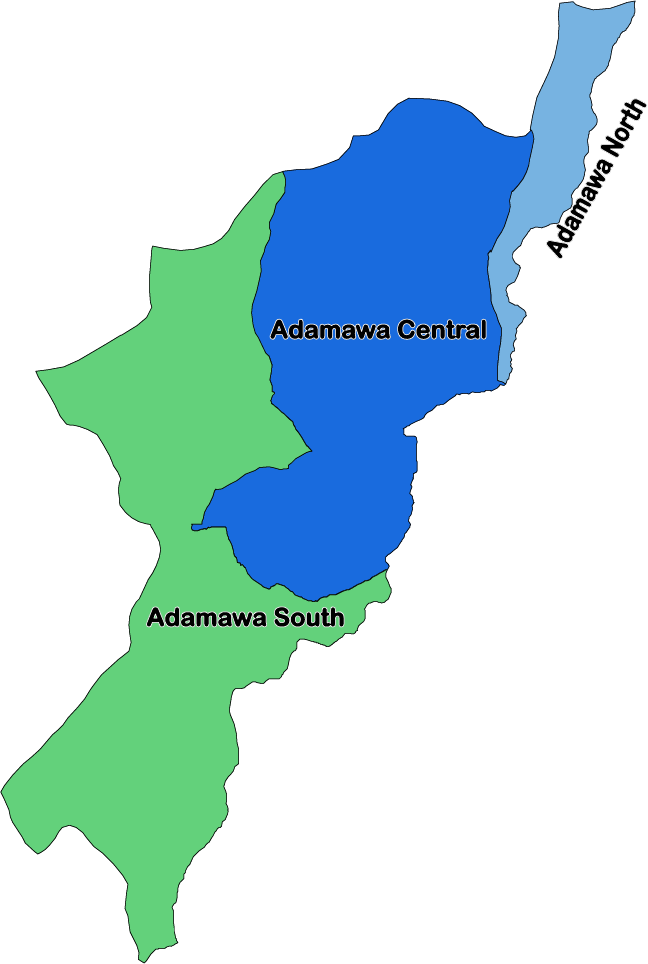
- APC incumbent retiring APC incumbent running for re-election PDP incumbent running for re-election

The 2023 Nigerian Senate elections in Adamawa State will be held on 25 February 2023, to elect the 3 federal Senators from Adamawa State, one from each of the state's three senatorial districts. The elections will coincide with the 2023 presidential election, as well as other elections to the Senate and elections to the House of Representatives; with state elections being held two weeks later. Primaries were held between 4 April and 9 June 2022.

== Background ==
In terms of the previous Senate elections, none of the three incumbent senators were returned, with APC-turned-ADC Adamawa Central Senator Abdul-Aziz Nyako retiring to unsuccessfully run for governor whilst both APC senators (North's Binta Masi Garba and South's Ahmad Mo'allahyidi Abubakar) were defeated in their re-election bids. In the Central district, Aishatu Dahiru Ahmed regained the seat for the APC with 57% of the vote; on the other hand, the PDP's Ishaku Elisha Abbo and Binos Dauda Yaroe won with 44% in the North district and 53% in the South district. These results showed both the failure of the Adamawa ADC to hold the seats it gained through defections and the PDP's gains in the state as the party also won five House of Representatives seats and gained control of the House of Assembly. The PDP presidential nominee, Adamawa-native Atiku Abubakar, also won the state back from Buhari and Ahmadu Umaru Fintiri defeated APC incumbent Bindow Jibrilla in the gubernatorial election.

During the 2019–2023 term, the all senators gained notoriety as Ahmed was the only women serving senator from northern Nigeria until December 2020 and Yaroe became known for medical projects in his district. However, Abbo was the most high-profile senator as he was caught on video violently assaulting a shop owner and eventually had to pay damages to his victim; he was also the youngest serving senator in the entire body and became the first senator to switch parties when he defected to the APC in November 2020.

== Overview ==
Affiliation	Party		Total
Affiliation	APC	PDP	Total
Previous Election	1	2	3
Before Election	2	1	3
After Election	1	2	3

== Summary ==
District	Incumbent		Results	
District	Incumbent	Party	Status	Candidates
Adamawa Central	Aishatu Dahiru Ahmed	APC	Incumbent retired New member elected PDP gain	▌Abdul-Aziz Nyako (APC); ▌Ahmadu Hamman (NNPP); ▌ ✓ Aminu Iya Abbas (PDP)
Adamawa North	Ishaku Elisha Abbo	APC (Note: This senator was elected as a member of the PDP but switched to the APC during their term.)	Incumbent re-elected	▌ ✓ Ishaku Elisha Abbo (APC); ▌Abdullahi Dauda Belel (NNPP); ▌Amos Yohana (PDP)
Adamawa South	Binos Dauda Yaroe	PDP	Incumbent re-elected	▌Adamu Ismaila Numan (APC); ▌ ✓ Binos Dauda Yaroe (PDP)

== Adamawa Central ==
2023 Adamawa Central Senatorial District election
- 25 February 2023
Nominee	Abdul-Aziz Nyako	Ahmadu Hamman	Abbas Aminu Iya
Party	APC	New Nigeria Peoples Party	PDP
Percentage			-->
Senator before election
Aishatu Dahiru Ahmed
APC
Elected Senator
To be determined
To be determined

The Adamawa Central district covers Fufore, Girei, Hong, Song, Yola North, and Yola South local government areas. The incumbent is Aishatu Dahiru Ahmed (APC), who was elected with 57.1% of the vote in 2019. In March 2022, Ahmed announced that she would run for governor of Adamawa State, instead of seeking re-election.

=== Primary elections ===
==== All Progressives Congress ====
On 20 April 2022, the APC National Executive Committee announced the party's schedule for senatorial primaries, setting its expression of interest form price at ₦3 million and nomination form price at ₦17 million with a 50% discount for candidates younger than 40 while women and candidates with disabilities get free nomination forms. Forms were to be sold from 26 April to 6 May until the deadline was later extended to 10 May then 12 May. After the submission of nomination forms by 13 May, candidates were screened by a party committee on 14 and 15 May while 18 May was the date for the screening appeal process. Ward congresses and LGA congresses were set for 16 and 17 May to elect delegates for the primary. Candidates approved by the screening process advanced to a primary set for 27 May, in concurrence with other APC senatorial primaries; challenges to the result could be made on 28 May.

On the primary date, three candidates contested an indirect primary in Yola that ended with former Senator Abdul-Aziz Nyako emerging as the nominee after results showed him defeating first runner-up Abdullahi Musa by a 58% margin. In his acceptance speech, Nyako thanked delegates before vowing to bring good representation to the district.

APC primary results
Party	Candidate	Votes	%
APC	Abdul-Aziz Nyako	292	77.45%
APC	Abdullahi Musa	72	19.10%
APC	Bindir Buba	13	3.45%
Total votes		377	100.00%
Invalid or blank votes		2	N/A
Turnout		379	Unknown

==== People's Democratic Party ====
On 16 March 2022, the national PDP announced its senatorial primary timetable, setting its expression of interest form price at ₦1 million and the nomination form price at ₦20 million with a 50% discount for candidates between 25 and 30. Forms were to be sold until 1 April but the party later extended the deadline four times before reaching a final deadline of 22 April. After the submission of nomination forms by 25 April, candidates were screened by a party committee on 27 April while 2 May was the rescheduled date for the screening appeal process. Ward congresses were set for 29 April and LGA congresses were rescheduled for 10 May to elect delegates for the primary. Candidates approved by the screening process advanced to a primary set for 23 May, in concurrence with other PDP senatorial primaries but due to often violently enforced Monday stay-at-home orders by separatists, southeastern state parties held their primaries on 24 May; challenges to the result could be made on 25 May.

On the primary date, an indirect primary in Yola resulted in the victory of Aminu Iya Abbas—the Speaker of the Adamawa State House of Assembly and MHA for Uba-Gaya. Abbas beat first runner-up Awwal Tukur, Adamawa State University Governing Council Chairman and the son of former Governor Bamanga Tukur, by a 31% margin. However, a group of losing aspirints filed a lawsuit challenging the primary based on claims of electoral irregularities; a Federal High Court judgment annulled the primary on 28 November but based the ruling on the illegal participation of Tukur, who had not resigned his appointed government position as required by law. In January 2023, Abbas appealed the ruling at the Yola Division of the Court of Appeal. The next month, the Court of Appeal reinstated Abbas as the valid nominee.

PDP primary results
Party	Candidate	Votes	%
PDP	Aminu Iya Abbas	125	53.88%
PDP	Awwal Tukur	54	23.28%
PDP	Mustapha Ibrahim Baba	32	13.79%
PDP	Mohammed Chubado Murtala Modibbo	13	5.60%
PDP	Daniel Bwala	4	1.72%
PDP	Abubakar Ibrahim Gwal	3	1.29%
PDP	D.D. Azura	1	0.43%
Total votes		232	100.00%

=== Campaign ===
In race analysis in December 2022, reporting from The Nation categorized the election as extremely competitive while also noting Ahmadu Hamman (NNPP) as a prominent candidate. A piece from The Africa Report in January echoed the sentiment of competitiveness, also pointing out the power of the Nyako family in the area.

=== General election ===
==== Results ====
2023 Adamawa Central Senatorial District election
Party	Candidate	Votes	%
ADC	Aliyu Butu		
APC	Abdul-Aziz Nyako		
LP	Saidu Ismaila Adamu		
New Nigeria Peoples Party	Ahmadu Hamman		
NRM	Nuhu Saad		
PDP	TBD		
PRP	Aminu Abubakar Dahiru		
SDP	Ibrahim Ahijo Karlahi		
YPP	Simon Bawa		
Total votes			100.00%
Invalid or blank votes			N/A
Turnout			

===== By federal constituency =====
The results of the election by federal constituency.

Federal Constituency	Abdul-Aziz Nyako APC		TBD PDP		Others		Total Valid Votes
Federal Constituency	Votes	Percentage	Votes	Percentage	Votes	Percentage	Total Valid Votes
Fufore/Song Federal Constituency (Note: Comprising the local government areas of Fufore and Song.)	TBD	%	TBD	%	TBD	%	TBD
Gombi/Hong Federal Constituency (Note: Comprising the local government areas of Gombi and Hong.)	TBD	%	TBD	%	TBD	%	TBD
Yola North/Yola South/Girei Federal Constituency (Note: Comprising the local government areas of Yola North, Yola South, and Girei.)	TBD	%	TBD	%	TBD	%	TBD
Totals	TBD	%	TBD	%	TBD	%	TBD

===== By local government area =====
The results of the election by local government area.

LGA	Abdul-Aziz Nyako APC		TBD PDP		Others		Total Valid Votes	Turnout Percentage
LGA	Votes	Percentage	Votes	Percentage	Votes	Percentage	Total Valid Votes	Turnout Percentage
Fufore	TBD	%	TBD	%	TBD	%	TBD	%
Girei	TBD	%	TBD	%	TBD	%	TBD	%
Gombi	TBD	%	TBD	%	TBD	%	TBD	%
Hong	TBD	%	TBD	%	TBD	%	TBD	%
Song	TBD	%	TBD	%	TBD	%	TBD	%
Yola North	TBD	%	TBD	%	TBD	%	TBD	%
Yola South	TBD	%	TBD	%	TBD	%	TBD	%
Totals	TBD	%	TBD	%	TBD	%	TBD	%

== Adamawa North ==
2023 Adamawa North Senatorial District election
- 25 February 2023
Nominee	TBD	Abdullahi Dauda Belel	Amos Yohana
Party	APC	New Nigeria Peoples Party	PDP
Senator before election
Ishaku Elisha Abbo
APC
Elected Senator
To be determined
To be determined

The Adamawa North district covers Madagali, Maiha, Michika, Mubi North, and Mubi South local government areas. The incumbent is Ishaku Elisha Abbo (APC), who was elected with 44.5% of the vote in 2019 as a member of the PDP; he defected to the APC in November 2020. In December 2020, Abbo said that he would run for governor of Adamawa State, instead of seeking re-election; however, he did not purchase gubernatorial primary forms and eventually chose to run for re-election to the Senate.

=== Primary elections ===
==== All Progressives Congress ====
On 20 April 2022, the APC National Executive Committee announced the party's schedule for senatorial primaries, setting its expression of interest form price at ₦3 million and nomination form price at ₦17 million with a 50% discount for candidates younger than 40 while women and candidates with disabilities get free nomination forms. Forms were to be sold from 26 April to 6 May until the deadline was later extended to 10 May then 12 May. After the submission of nomination forms by 13 May, candidates were screened by a party committee on 14 and 15 May while 18 May was the date for the screening appeal process. Ward congresses and LGA congresses were set for 16 and 17 May to elect delegates for the primary. Candidates approved by the screening process advanced to a primary set for 27 May, in concurrence with other APC senatorial primaries; challenges to the result could be made on 28 May.

On the primary date, screened candidates contested an indirect primary that ended with Abbo's renomination. Abbo returned as nominee with results showing him defeating runner-up businessman Hamisu Idris Medugu by a 13% margin. In a Facebook post, Abbo thanked his campaign team and former opponents. However, in the wake of Abbo's expulsion from the APC in October, party members sued to have him removed as the party's senatorial nominee. A Federal High Court ruling on 10 January 2023 removed Abbo as nominee; in response, Abbo vowed to appeal the judgment.

APC primary results
Party	Candidate	Votes	%
APC	Ishaku Elisha Abbo	137	48.41%
APC	Hamisu Idris Medugu	100	35.34%
APC	Binta Masi Garba	46	16.25%
APC	Abdulrahaman Kwacham (withdrawn)	0	0.00%
Total votes		283	100.00%
Invalid or blank votes		0	N/A
Turnout		283	Unknown

==== People's Democratic Party ====
On 16 March 2022, the national PDP announced its senatorial primary timetable, setting its expression of interest form price at ₦1 million and the nomination form price at ₦20 million with a 50% discount for candidates between 25 and 30. Forms were to be sold until 1 April but the party later extended the deadline four times before reaching a final deadline of 22 April. After the submission of nomination forms by 25 April, candidates were screened by a party committee on 27 April while 2 May was the rescheduled date for the screening appeal process. Ward congresses were set for 29 April and LGA congresses were rescheduled for 10 May to elect delegates for the primary. Candidates approved by the screening process advanced to a primary set for 23 May, in concurrence with other PDP senatorial primaries but due to often violently enforced Monday stay-at-home orders by separatists, southeastern state parties held their primaries on 24 May; challenges to the result could be made on 25 May.

Four screened candidates advanced to the primary where Amos Yohana defeated Zira Maigadi by a 56% margin.

PDP primary results
Party	Candidate	Votes	%
PDP	Amos Yohana	123	71.93%
PDP	Zira Maigadi	28	16.37%
PDP	Aji Wampana	18	10.53%
PDP	Philip Alango	2	1.17%
Total votes		171	100.00%

=== Campaign ===
In a Senate campaign analysis piece in December 2022, The Nation reporters categorized Abbo as the frontrunner due to the relatively low name recognition of his opponents but noted the crossover appeal Abdullahi Dauda Belel (NNPP) appeared to have among supporters of other parties. However, the race was drastically changed in the next month when a court ruling removed Abbo as the APC nominee due to his expulsion from the party.

=== General election ===
==== Results ====
2023 Adamawa North Senatorial District election
Party	Candidate	Votes	%
ADC	Ahmed Usman		
APC	TBD		
LP	Mohammed Adamu		
New Nigeria Peoples Party	Abdullahi Dauda Belel		
NRM	Grace Ezra		
PDP	Amos Yohana		
PRP	Zakariya Joshua Medugu		
SDP	Hadiza Ahmed		
Total votes			100.00%
Invalid or blank votes			N/A
Turnout			

==== By federal constituency ====
The results of the election by federal constituency.

Federal Constituency	Ishaku Abbo APC		Amos Yohana PDP		Others		Total Valid Votes
Federal Constituency	Votes	Percentage	Votes	Percentage	Votes	Percentage	Total Valid Votes
Madagali/Michika Federal Constituency (Note: Comprising the local government areas of Madagali and Michika.)	TBD	%	TBD	%	TBD	%	TBD
Maiha/Mubi North/Mubi South Federal Constituency (Note: Comprising the local government areas of Maiha, Mubi North, and Mubi South.)	TBD	%	TBD	%	TBD	%	TBD
Totals	TBD	%	TBD	%	TBD	%	TBD

==== By local government area ====
The results of the election by local government area.

LGA	Ishaku Abbo APC		Amos Yohana PDP		Others		Total Valid Votes	Turnout Percentage
LGA	Votes	Percentage	Votes	Percentage	Votes	Percentage	Total Valid Votes	Turnout Percentage
Madagali	TBD	%	TBD	%	TBD	%	TBD	%
Maiha	TBD	%	TBD	%	TBD	%	TBD	%
Michika	TBD	%	TBD	%	TBD	%	TBD	%
Mubi North	TBD	%	TBD	%	TBD	%	TBD	%
Mubi South	TBD	%	TBD	%	TBD	%	TBD	%
Totals	TBD	%	TBD	%	TBD	%	TBD	%

== Adamawa South ==
2023 Adamawa South Senatorial District election
- 25 February 2023
Nominee	Adamu Ismaila Numan	Binos Dauda Yaroe
Party	APC	PDP
Senator before election
Binos Dauda Yaroe
PDP
Elected Senator
To be determined
To be determined

The Adamawa South district covers Demsa, Ganye, Guyuk, Jada, Lamurde, Mayo-Belwa, Numan, Shelleng, and Toungo local government areas. The incumbent is Binos Dauda Yaroe (PDP), who was elected with 53.5% of the vote in 2019, who is seeking re-election.

=== Primary elections ===
==== All Progressives Congress ====
On 20 April 2022, the APC National Executive Committee announced the party's schedule for senatorial primaries, setting its expression of interest form price at ₦3 million and nomination form price at ₦17 million with a 50% discount for candidates younger than 40 while women and candidates with disabilities get free nomination forms. Forms were to be sold from 26 April to 6 May until the deadline was later extended to 10 May then 12 May. After the submission of nomination forms by 13 May, candidates were screened by a party committee on 14 and 15 May while 18 May was the date for the screening appeal process. Ward congresses and LGA congresses were set for 16 and 17 May to elect delegates for the primary. Candidates approved by the screening process advanced to a primary set for 27 May, in concurrence with other APC senatorial primaries; challenges to the result could be made on 28 May.

On the primary date, five candidates threatened to withdraw from the primary due to alleged vote-buying by an agent of the sixth candidate—Adamu Ismaila Numan. In response, the primary committee suspended the exercise and eventually rescheduled it for 29 May. The rescheduled primary ended with victory for Ismaila Numan but the five other candidates again protested the results and called for Ismaila Numan's disqualification due to vote buying.

APC primary results
Party	Candidate	Votes	%
APC	Adamu Ismaila Numan	403	91.80%
APC	Ahmed Abubakar	26	5.92%
APC	Grace Folashade Bent	8	1.82%
APC	Bala Sanga	1	0.23%
APC	Bridget Zidon	1	0.23%
APC	Sani Jada	0	0.00%
Total votes		439	100.00%
Invalid or blank votes		10	N/A
Turnout		449	Unknown

==== People's Democratic Party ====
On 16 March 2022, the national PDP announced its senatorial primary timetable, setting its expression of interest form price at ₦1 million and the nomination form price at ₦20 million with a 50% discount for candidates between 25 and 30. Forms were to be sold until 1 April but the party later extended the deadline four times before reaching a final deadline of 22 April. After the submission of nomination forms by 25 April, candidates were screened by a party committee on 27 April while 2 May was the rescheduled date for the screening appeal process. Ward congresses were set for 29 April and LGA congresses were rescheduled for 10 May to elect delegates for the primary. Candidates approved by the screening process advanced to a primary set for 23 May, in concurrence with other PDP senatorial primaries but due to often violently enforced Monday stay-at-home orders by separatists, southeastern state parties held their primaries on 24 May; challenges to the result could be made on 25 May.

On the primary date, an indirect primary in Numan resulted in the Yaroe's renomination as he beat his sole opponent—Peter Fwa—by a 62% margin.

PDP primary results
Party	Candidate	Votes	%
PDP	Binos Dauda Yaroe	232	80.84%
PDP	Peter Fwa	55	19.16%
Total votes		287	100.00%

=== Campaign ===
In review of the campaign in December 2022, reporting from The Nation categorized Yaroe as the frontrunner due to the relatively low name recognition of his opponents and the controversial APC primary.

=== General election ===
==== Results ====
2023 Adamawa South Senatorial District election
Party	Candidate	Votes	%
ADC	Umaru Suleiman Danrimi		
APC	Adamu Ismaila Numan		
LP	Jesse Seth Ngurikan		
New Nigeria Peoples Party	Abubakar Buba Pullo		
NRM	Bellow Hayatu Muktar		
PDP	Binos Dauda Yaroe		
PRP	Nurudden Adam Nyako		
SDP	Burke Ghate Williams		
Total votes			100.00%
Invalid or blank votes			N/A
Turnout			

===== By federal constituency =====
The results of the election by federal constituency.

Federal Constituency	Adamu Ismaila Numan APC		Binos Dauda Yaroe PDP		Others		Total Valid Votes
Federal Constituency	Votes	Percentage	Votes	Percentage	Votes	Percentage	Total Valid Votes
Demsa/Numan/Lamurde Federal Constituency (Note: Comprising the local government areas of Demsa, Numan, and Lamurde.)	TBD	%	TBD	%	TBD	%	TBD
Guyuk/Shelleng Federal Constituency (Note: Comprising the local government areas of Guyuk and Shelleng.)	TBD	%	TBD	%	TBD	%	TBD
Mayo Belwa/Ganye/Toungo/Jada Federal Constituency (Note: Comprising the local government areas of Mayo-Belwa, Ganye, Toungo, and Jada.)	TBD	%	TBD	%	TBD	%	TBD
Totals	TBD	%	TBD	%	TBD	%	TBD

===== By local government area =====
The results of the election by local government area.

LGA	Adamu Ismaila Numan APC		Binos Dauda Yaroe PDP		Others		Total Valid Votes	Turnout Percentage
LGA	Votes	Percentage	Votes	Percentage	Votes	Percentage	Total Valid Votes	Turnout Percentage
Demsa	TBD	%	TBD	%	TBD	%	TBD	%
Ganye	TBD	%	TBD	%	TBD	%	TBD	%
Guyuk	TBD	%	TBD	%	TBD	%	TBD	%
Jada	TBD	%	TBD	%	TBD	%	TBD	%
Lamurde	TBD	%	TBD	%	TBD	%	TBD	%
Mayo-Belwa	TBD	%	TBD	%	TBD	%	TBD	%
Numan	TBD	%	TBD	%	TBD	%	TBD	%
Shelleng	TBD	%	TBD	%	TBD	%	TBD	%
Toungo	TBD	%	TBD	%	TBD	%	TBD	%
Totals	TBD	%	TBD	%	TBD	%	TBD	%

== See also ==
- 2023 Nigerian Senate election
- 2023 Nigerian elections
