= 2023 Nigerian presidential election in Adamawa State =

- 25 February 2023
- Registered: 2,196,566
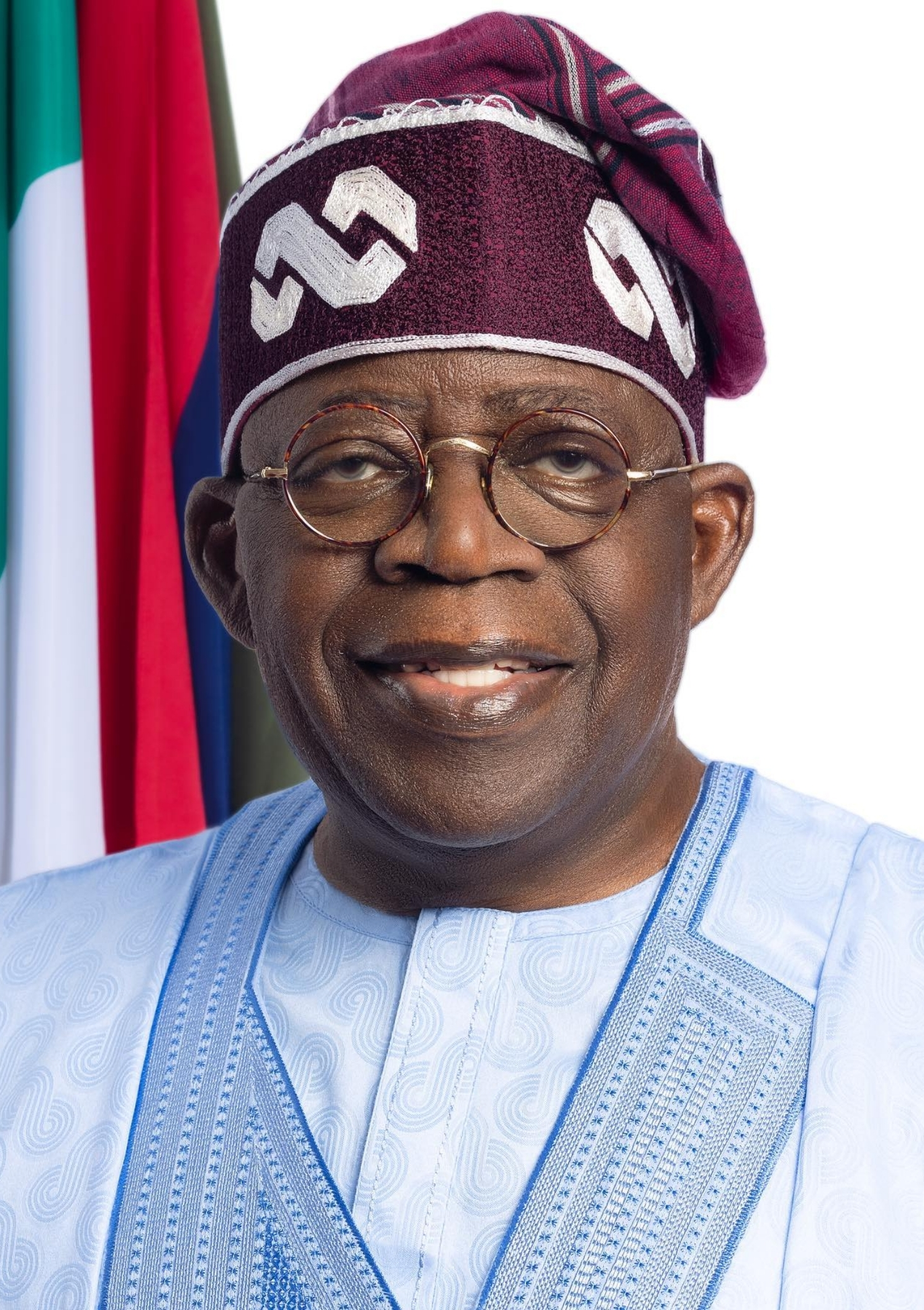

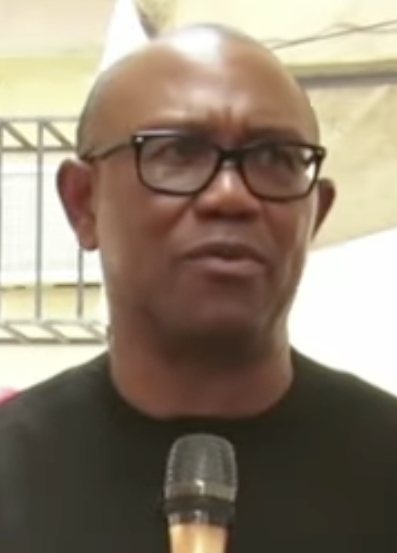

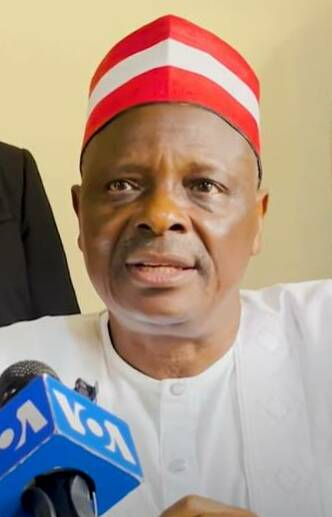

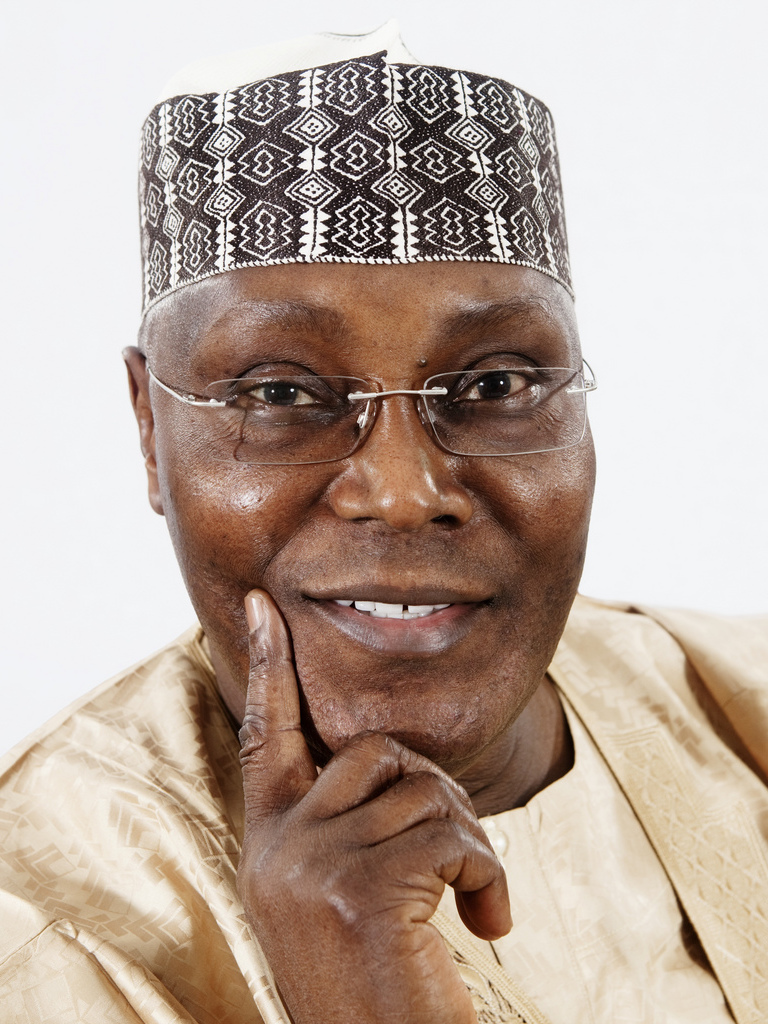
Nominee	Bola Tinubu	Peter Obi
Party	APC	LP
Home state	Lagos	Anambra
Running mate	Kashim Shettima	Yusuf Datti Baba-Ahmed
Nominee	Rabiu Kwankwaso	Atiku Abubakar
Party	NNPP	PDP
Home state	Kano	Adamawa
Running mate	Isaac Idahosa	Ifeanyi Okowa
President before election
Muhammadu Buhari
APC
Elected President
Bola Tinubu
APC

The 2023 Nigerian presidential election in Adamawa State will be held on 25 February 2023 as part of the nationwide 2023 Nigerian presidential election to elect the president and vice president of Nigeria. Other federal elections, including elections to the House of Representatives and the Senate, will also be held on the same date while state elections will be held two weeks afterward on 11 March.

== Background ==
Adamawa State is a large, diverse northeastern state in the process of recovering from the worst of the Boko Haram insurgency. The state also has to contend with an underdeveloped yet vital agricultural sector and low education rates along with continued security challenges from Boko Haram and ISWAP to sustained conflict between herders and farmers.

Politically, the 2019 Adamawa elections were a swing back to the PDP as its presidential nominee Atiku Abubakar won the state back from Buhari and Ahmadu Umaru Fintiri unseated APC Governor Bindo Jibrilla. Legislatively the PDP also gained ground, winning two Senate seats, five House of Representatives seats, and control of the House of Assembly.

== Polling ==
Polling organisation/client	Fieldwork date	Sample size					Others	Undecided	Undisclosed	Not voting
Polling organisation/client	Fieldwork date	Sample size	Tinubu APC	Obi LP	Kwankwaso NNPP	Abubakar PDP	Others	Undecided	Undisclosed	Not voting
BantuPage	December 2022	N/A	17%	7%	2%	44%	–	24%	2%	4%
Nextier (Adamawa crosstabs of national poll)	27 January 2023	N/A	33.8%	30.8%	6.3%	29.2%	–	–	–	–
SBM Intelligence for EiE (Adamawa crosstabs of national poll)	22 January-6 February 2023	N/A	9%	11%	–	76%	5%	–	–	–

== Projections ==
Source	Projection		As of
Africa Elects (Note: AfricaElects projections predict the likelihood of a candidate winning a state by categorizing a state as "Safe" for exceedingly likely, "Likely" for somewhat likely, and "Lean" for least likely. If no clear determination could be made, states are categorized as "tossups".)	Safe Abubakar		24 February 2023
Dataphyte (Note: Dataphyte projections predict candidates' projected votal shares in each state.)
Dataphyte	Tinubu:	24.51%	11 February 2023
Dataphyte	Obi:	20.60%	11 February 2023
Dataphyte	Abubakar:	37.55%	11 February 2023
Dataphyte	Others:	17.34%	11 February 2023
Enough is Enough- SBM Intelligence (Note: EiE-SBM projections predict which candidates will win states.)	Abubakar		17 February 2023
SBM Intelligence (Note: SBM projections predict which candidates will win states or, if no determination could be made, categorizes states as "Too close to call" (TCC).)	Abubakar		15 December 2022
ThisDay (Note: ThisDay projections predict candidates' projected votal shares in each state.)
ThisDay	Tinubu:	20%	27 December 2022
ThisDay	Obi:	10%	27 December 2022
ThisDay	Kwankwaso:	5%	27 December 2022
ThisDay	Abubakar:	60%	27 December 2022
ThisDay	Others/Undecided:	5%	27 December 2022
The Nation (Note: The Nation projections predict which candidates will win states or, if no determination could be made, categorizes states as "Battlegrounds.")	Battleground		12-19 February 2023

== General election ==
=== Results ===
2023 Nigerian presidential election in Adamawa State
Party	Candidate	Votes	%
A	Christopher Imumolen		
AA	Hamza al-Mustapha		
ADP	Yabagi Sani		
APP	Osita Nnadi		
AAC	Omoyele Sowore		
ADC	Dumebi Kachikwu		
APC	Bola Tinubu		
APGA	Peter Umeadi		
APM	Princess Chichi Ojei		
BP	Sunday Adenuga		
LP	Peter Obi		
NRM	Felix Johnson Osakwe		
New Nigeria Peoples Party	Rabiu Kwankwaso		
PRP	Kola Abiola		
PDP	Atiku Abubakar		
SDP	Adewole Adebayo		
YPP	Malik Ado-Ibrahim		
ZLP	Dan Nwanyanwu		
Total votes			100.00%
Invalid or blank votes			N/A
Turnout			

==== By senatorial district ====
The results of the election by senatorial district.

Senatorial district	Bola Tinubu APC		Atiku Abubakar PDP		Peter Obi LP		Rabiu Kwankwaso NNPP		Others		Total valid votes
Senatorial district	Votes	%	Votes	%	Votes	%	Votes	%	Votes	%	Total valid votes
Adamawa Central Senatorial District (Note: Comprising the local government areas of Fufore, Girei, Gombi, Hong, Song, Yola North, and Yola South.)	TBD	%	TBD	%	TBD	%	TBD	%	TBD	%	TBD
Adamawa North Senatorial District (Note: Comprising the local government areas of Madagali, Maiha, Michika, Mubi North, and Mubi South.)	TBD	%	TBD	%	TBD	%	TBD	%	TBD	%	TBD
Adamawa South Senatorial District (Note: Comprising the local government areas of Demsa, Ganye, Guyuk, Jada, Lamurde, Mayo-Belwa, Numan, Shelleng, and Toungo.)	TBD	%	TBD	%	TBD	%	TBD	%	TBD	%	TBD
Totals	TBD	%	TBD	%	TBD	%	TBD	%	TBD	%	TBD

==== By federal constituency ====
The results of the election by federal constituency.

Federal constituency	Bola Tinubu APC		Atiku Abubakar PDP		Peter Obi LP		Rabiu Kwankwaso NNPP		Others		Total valid votes
Federal constituency	Votes	%	Votes	%	Votes	%	Votes	%	Votes	%	Total valid votes
Demsa/Numan/Lamurde Federal Constituency (Note: Comprising the local government areas of Demsa, Numan, and Lamurde.)	TBD	%	TBD	%	TBD	%	TBD	%	TBD	%	TBD
Fufore/Song Federal Constituency (Note: Comprising the local government areas of Fufore and Song.)	TBD	%	TBD	%	TBD	%	TBD	%	TBD	%	TBD
Gombi/Hong Federal Constituency (Note: Comprising the local government areas of Gombi and Hong.)	TBD	%	TBD	%	TBD	%	TBD	%	TBD	%	TBD
Guyuk/Shelleng Federal Constituency (Note: Comprising the local government areas of Guyuk and Shelleng.)	TBD	%	TBD	%	TBD	%	TBD	%	TBD	%	TBD
Madagali/Michika Federal Constituency (Note: Comprising the local government areas of Madagali and Michika.)	TBD	%	TBD	%	TBD	%	TBD	%	TBD	%	TBD
Maiha/Mubi North/Mubi South Federal Constituency (Note: Comprising the local government areas of Maiha, Mubi North, and Mubi South.)	TBD	%	TBD	%	TBD	%	TBD	%	TBD	%	TBD
Mayo Belwa/Ganye/Toungo/Jada Federal Constituency (Note: Comprising the local government areas of Mayo-Belwa, Ganye, Toungo, and Jada.)	TBD	%	TBD	%	TBD	%	TBD	%	TBD	%	TBD
Yola North/Yola South/Girei Federal Constituency (Note: Comprising the local government areas of Yola North, Yola South, and Girei.)	TBD	%	TBD	%	TBD	%	TBD	%	TBD	%	TBD
Totals	TBD	%	TBD	%	TBD	%	TBD	%	TBD	%	TBD

==== By local government area ====
The results of the election by local government area.

Local government area	Bola Tinubu APC		Atiku Abubakar PDP		Peter Obi LP		Rabiu Kwankwaso NNPP		Others		Total valid votes	Turnout (%)
Local government area	Votes	%	Votes	%	Votes	%	Votes	%	Votes	%	Total valid votes	Turnout (%)
Demsa	5,746	17.89%	17,166	53.46%	7,962	24.80%	199	0.62%	1,037	3.23%	32,110	34.80%
Fufore	12,633	31.03%	26,059	64.01%	897	2.20%	508	1.25%	615	1.51%	40,712	32.88%
Ganye	10,112	29.93%	21,672	64.15%	1,069	3.16%	191	0.57%	739	2.19%	33,783	34.76%
Girei	8,531	27.89%	17,557	57.40%	3,748	12.25%	254	0.83%	500	1.63%	30,590	37.17%
Gombi	8,341	%	21,744	%	2,628	%	541	%	TBD	%	TBD	%
Guyuk	5,904	20.56%	13,942	48.55%	8,165	28.43%	91	0.32%	615	2.14%	28,717	%
Jada	8,479	%	28,561	%	984	%	186	%	TBD	%	TBD	%
Lamurde	3,645	15.05%	9,912	40.94%	9,744	40.24%	188	0.78%	724	2.99%	24,213	38.90%
Madagali	4,935	%	18,077	%	4,034	%	201	%	TBD	%	TBD	%
Maiha	7,335	%	14,088	%	440	%	146	%	TBD	%	TBD	%
Michika	7,062	%	28,328	%	6,047	%	177	%	TBD	%	TBD	%
Mubi North	10,078	%	21,528	%	12,261	%	1,253	%	TBD	%	TBD	%
Mubi South	9,399	%	15,463	%	2,936	%	519	%	TBD	%	TBD	%
Numan	5,115	%	8,984	%	10,229	%	168	%	TBD	%	TBD	%
Shelleng	6,213	27.64%	14,765	65.67%	1,028	4.57%	69	0.31%	407	1.81%	22,482	%
Song	10,993	26.05%	20,406	48.36%	8,506	20.16%	1,223	2.90%	1,065	2.53%	42,193	39.97%
Toungo	4,163	%	7,401	%	651	%	59	%	TBD	%	TBD	%
Yola North	15,885	%	32,136	%	9,925	%	584	%	TBD	%	TBD	%
Yola South	13,552	27.08%	31,774	63.49%	3,469	6.93%	379	0.76%	873	1.74%	50,047	32.68%
Totals	TBD	%	TBD	%	TBD	%	TBD	%	TBD	%	TBD	%

== See also ==
- 2023 Adamawa State elections
- 2023 Nigerian presidential election
