= Mubi South =

- LGA
- Interactive map of Mubi South
- Country: Nigeria
- State: Adamawa State
- Capital: Gella
- Time zone: UTC+1 (WAT)

Mubi South is a Local Government Area of Adamawa State, Nigeria.

== Demography ==
=== Languages ===
In a 2023 demographic survey of Internally displaced persons (IDPs), the local government was found to be predominantly Fulfulde and Hausa speaking. The most commonly reported languages (spoken at homes and places of primary residence) present in the local government area were; Hausa – 40.7%, Fulfulde, specifically Eastern or Adamawa Fulfulde – 34.0%, Gude – 6.5% and Kamwe – 6.1%. Other languages were; Marghi – 2.8%, Kanuri – 2.4%, Igbo – 1.4%, Kilba/South Marghi – 1.3%, Bura – 1.1%, Glavda – 0.9%, Shuwa Arabic – 0.7%, Nzanyi – 0.6%, and three other languages of around 0.5% each. This data was not obtained from a nationally co-ordinated population headcount. The last time Nigeria included ethnic and linguistic data in its enumeration parameters was in the national census of 1963.

== Climate ==
The rainy season in Mubi south is unpleasant and overcast, the dry season is partly cloudy, and it is hot all year. Throughout the year, the temperature normally ranges from 60 °F to 101 °F, with temperatures rarely falling below 55 °F or rising over 107 °F.

With an average daily high temperature of 37 °C (98 °F), the hot season lasts for 2.1 months, from March 4 to May 7. With an average high of 38 °C (100 °F) and low of 26 °C (78 °F), April is the warmest month of the year in Mubi.

With an average daily maximum temperature below 31 °C (87 °F), the cool season lasts for 3.0 months, from June 29 to September 30. In Mubi, January is the coldest month of the year, with an average low of 16 °C (61 °F) and high of 31 °C (88 °F).

== See also ==
- Mubi
