= A8 highway (Nigeria) =

Road in Nigeria

Coordinates: 9.388041°N 12.168931°E

Trunk Road A8

Location
- Country: Nigeria

Highway system
- Transport in Nigeria

The A8 highway is a highway in the Adamawa State of Nigeria. It runs from the A4 highway at Numan to meet the A13 highway at Yola Airport outside Jimeta connecting two larger towns south of the Benue River.
