= Adamawa =

Adamawa or Adamaua may refer to:

== Places ==
- Adamawa Plateau, which rises in Nigeria, cuts across Cameroon, and terminates in the Central African Republic

Present

- Adamawa Region, Cameroon
- Adamawa State, Nigeria

Historical

- Adamawa Emirate, founded by and named after Modibo Adama
- The former Catholic Apostolic Prefecture of Adamaua

== Other ==
- Adamawa languages, a family of languages spoken in the above area
- Adamawa (cattle), an African breed of cattle
