= Yola North =

- LGA
- Map of Adamawa State highlighting Yola North
- Interactive map of Yola North
- Location within Nigeria
- Country: Nigeria
- State: Adamawa State
- Capital: Yola

Area
  - Total: 67.3 km^{2} (26.0 sq mi)

Population (2022)
  - Total: 307,900
  - Density: 4,580/km^{2} (11,800/sq mi)
- Time zone: UTC+1 (WAT)

Yola North is a Local Government Area of Adamawa State, Nigeria. It includes Jimeta. It is a suburb of Yola (Yola South).

Yola is the administrative capital of Adamawa State in Nigeria's northeastern region.

== Demography ==
In a 2023 demographic survey of Internally displaced persons (IDPs), the local government was found to be predominantly Hausa and Fulfulde speaking. The most commonly reported languages (spoken at homes and places of primary residence) present in the local government area were; Hausa – 46.6%, Fulfulde, specifically Eastern or Adamawa Fulfulde – 20.4%, English – 8.2%, Kilba/South Marghi – 6.3%, Longuda – 3.8%, Bura – 3.2%, Kamwe – 2.1%, Chamba Donga – 1.9%, Bachama/Bwatiye – 1.9%, Unknown – 1.7%, Jukun – 1.3%, and four other languages spoken by populations under 1% each. This data was not obtained from a nationally co-ordinated population headcount. The last time Nigeria included ethnic and linguistic data in its enumeration parameters was in the national census of 1963.

== Climate/Geography ==
Yola North LGA experiences two distinct seasons—the dry and the rainy—with an average temperature of 33 degrees Celsius or 91.4 degrees Fahrenheit. The well-known Mandara Mountains range is located in the LGA, and the average wind speed in the region is 10 km/h (6.2 mph).
