= FUB =

FUB may refer to:

- Adamawa Fulfulde language
- Federation of Bicycle Users in France, the Fédération française des Usagers de la Bicyclette in France
- Free University of Berlin, in Germany
- Free University of Bozen-Bolzano, in Bolzano, Italy
- Free University of Brussels, in Brussels, Belgium; now split into:
  - Université libre de Bruxelles, a French-speaking university
  - Vrije Universiteit Brussel, a Dutch-speaking university
