= Jada, Nigeria =

Jada
- LGA and town
- Interactive map of Jada
- Location within Nigeria
- Coordinates: 8°46′N 12°9′E
- Country: Nigeria
- State: Adamawa State

Area
  - Total: 3,583 km^{2} (1,383 sq mi)

Population (2022)
  - Total: 259,700
  - Density: 72.48/km^{2} (187.7/sq mi)
- Time zone: UTC+1 (WAT)

Jada is a town and local government area in Adamawa State, Nigeria.

== History ==
Jada, as a local government area, was created from the old Ganye local government area of Adamawa state. Ganye, the food basket of Adamawa State is still the "mother" of the whole Chamba land under the leadership of Alhaji. Adamu Sanda (first class chief) and Gangwari of Ganye local government area. Ganye, Jada, Toungo, and some part of Mayo Belwa, the four listed local government are occupied by Chamba people (samba or sama).

== Demography ==
In a 2022 demographic survey of Internally displaced persons (IDPs), the most commonly reported languages (spoken at homes and places of primary residence) present in the local government area were; Fulfulde, specifically Eastern or Adamawa Fulfulde – 37.3%, Chamba Donga – 21.1%, Hausa – 26.5%, Mumuye – 3.1%, English – 1.6%, Kanuri – 0.8%, and Longuda, South Marghi, Kamwe with 0.5% each. This data was not obtained from a nationally co-ordinated population headcount. The last time Nigeria included ethnic and linguistic data in its enumeration parameters was in the national census of 1963.

== Climate ==
The rainy season in Jada is oppressive and overcast, the dry season is partly cloudy, and it is hot all year. Throughout the year, the temperature normally ranges from 16 °C (61 °F) to 37 °C (98 °F), with temperatures rarely falling below 13 °C (55 °F) or rising over 40 °C (104 °F).

=== Precipitation ===
A wet day in Jada is defined as a day with a minimum of 1.0 millimetre (0.04 inches) of liquid or liquid-equivalent precipitation. In Jada, the probability of encountering a wet day during the fall experiences a sharp and swift decline, commencing the season at 86% and diminishing to just 1% by the season's end.

For context, the highest likelihood of a wet day throughout the year is 87%, occurring on August 24, while the lowest probability is 0% on December 30.

== Districts ==
- Danaba
- Jada
- Koma
- Leko
- Mapeo
- Mayo-Kalaye
- Mbulo
- Nyibango

== Villages ==
- Yelli
- Nadeu
- Nagum
- Dagula
- Gangnai
- Kilbawo
- Nassarawo
- Wuro Abbo
- Jamtari
- Pakorgel
- Sarkin Yamma
- Choncha
- Deggi
- Konglo
- Ngolomba
- Samlo
- Tantile
- Tuli
- Dalami
- Kubi
- Mayo-Hako
- Gangnai
- Kilbawo
- Nassarawo
- Wuro Abbo
- Banche
- Dashen
- Balauru
- Gaadjo
- Kojoli
- Namberu
- Sapeo

== Notable people ==
- Atiku Abubakar: politician, businessman, and philanthropist.
