= Yola South =

- LGA
- Interactive map of Yola South
- Country: Nigeria
- State: Adamawa State
- Capital: Yola
- Established: 27th August, 1991

Government
  - Type: Local government
  - Local Government Area Chairman: Salihu Usman Malkohi

Area
  - Total: 919 km^{2} (355 sq mi)
- Elevation: 599 m (1,965 ft)

Population (2022)
  - Total: 302,500
  - Density: 329.2/km^{2} (853/sq mi)
- Time zone: UTC+1 (WAT)
- Postal code: 640101
- Geocode: 9.25930,12.41650

Yola South is a Local Government Area of Adamawa State, Nigeria. It is one of the local government areas in the Yola metropolitan area, including Jimeta.

== Demography ==
In a 2023 demographic survey of Internally displaced persons (IDPs), the local government was found to be predominantly Hausa and Fulfulde speaking. The most commonly reported languages (spoken at homes and places of primary residence) present in the local government area were; Hausa – 43.6%, Fulfulde, specifically Eastern or Adamawa Fulfulde – 38.7%, English – 4.8%, Marghi – 3.2%, Chamba Donga – 3.0%, and Kilba/South Marghi – 2.9%. Other languages included; Bura – 1.1%, Karekare – 1.0%, Bachama/Bwatiye – 1.0%, and three other languages spoken by populations under 0.3% each. This data was not obtained from a nationally co-ordinated population headcount. The last time Nigeria included ethnic and linguistic data in its enumeration parameters was in the national census of 1963.

== Climate/Geography ==
Yola South LGA experiences two different seasons—the dry and the rainy—with an average temperature of 33 degrees Celsius or 91 degrees Fahrenheit. The well-known Shebshi and Dimlang Mountains are located in the LGA, and the average wind speed in the region is 10 km/h (6.2 mph).

== See also ==
- Yola
