= Mubi North =

- LGA
- Interactive map of Mubi North
- Location within Nigeria
- Coordinates: 10°16′N 13°16′E
- Country: Nigeria
- State: Adamawa State
- Capital: Mubi
- Time zone: UTC+1 (WAT)

Mubi North is a Local Government Area of Adamawa State, Nigeria. The town is the location of the Adamawa State University and the Federal Polytechnic, Mubi.

== Demography ==
In a 2023 demographic survey of Internally displaced persons (IDPs), the local government was found to be predominantly Fulfulde and Hausa speaking. The most commonly reported languages (spoken at homes and places of primary residence) present in the local government area were; Fulfulde, specifically Eastern or Adamawa Fulfulde – 33.7%, Hausa – 32.7%, Marghi – 6.2%, Kanuri – 5.7%, Kilba/South Marghi – 5.3%, Kamwe – 4.5%, Bachama/Bwatiye – 3.2%, Bura – 1.5%, Wandala (Mandara) – 1.5%, Lamang – 1.4%, and five other languages spoken by populations under 0.5% each. This data was not obtained from a nationally co-ordinated population headcount. The last time Nigeria included ethnic and linguistic data in its enumeration parameters was in the national census of 1963.

== Climate ==
The rainy season in Mubi is oppressive and overcast, the dry season is partly cloudy, and it is hot all year. Throughout the year, the temperature normally ranges from 60 °F to 101 °F, with temperatures rarely falling below 55 °F or rising over 107 °F.

=== Temperature ===
From March 4 to May 7, the hot season, with an average daily high temperature above 98 °F, lasts for 2.1 months. In Mubi, April is the hottest month of the year, with an average high of 100 °F and low of 78 °F.

From June 29 to September 30 there is a 3.0 month cool season with an average daily high temperature of less than 87 °F. With an average low of 61 °F and high of 88 °F, January is the coldest month of the year in Mubi.

=== Clouds ===
The average proportion of sky that is covered by clouds in Mubi varies significantly seasonally throughout the year.

Around October 23 marks the start of Mubi's clearer season, which lasts for 4.5 months and ends around March 9.

In Mubi, January is the clearest month of the year, with the sky remaining clear, mostly clear, or partly overcast 56% of the time.

Beginning around March 9 and lasting about 7.5 months, the cloudier period of the year ends around October 23.

May is the cloudiest month of the year in Mubi, with the sky being overcast or mostly cloudy 76% of the time on average during this month.

=== Precipitation ===
A day is considered to be wet if there has been at least 1.0 millimetre (0.04 inches) of liquid or liquid-equivalent precipitation. Throughout the year, there are huge variations in the likelihood of rainy days in Mubi.

In the 4.5-month-long wetter season, which runs from May 18 to October 4, there is a greater than 43% chance that any given day would be rainy. With an average of 26.3 days with at least 1.0 millimetre (0.04 inches) of precipitation, August is the month with the most rainy days in Mubi.

From October 4 to May 18, the dry season lasts 7.5 months. With an average of no days with at least 1.0 millimetre (0.04 inches) of precipitation, January is the month with the fewest wet days in Mubi.

We categorize wet days into those that include snow, rain, or a combination of the three. In Mubi, August has an average of 26.3 days of rain, which is the most of any month. This classification shows that rain alone is the most frequent type of precipitation throughout the year, with a high likelihood of 87% on August 18.
