= North East (Nigeria) =

- Geopolitical zone
- Country: Nigeria
- States: Adamawa State; Bauchi State; Borno State; Gombe State; Taraba State; Yobe State
- Largest city: Maiduguri
- Major cities: Bauchi; Yola; Mubi; Gombe; Jimeta; Potiskum; Jalingo; Gashua; Bama; Wukari; Takum

Area
  - Total: 272,451 km^{2} (105,194 sq mi)

Population (2022)
  - Total: 30,541,900
  - Density: 112/km^{2} (290/sq mi)
- Time zone: UTC+1 (WAT)
- Languages: Bade; Bata; Bole; Bura; Cibak; Dadiya; Daka; English; Fulfulde; Gera; Hausa; Huba; Izere; Jarawa; Kamwe; Kanembu; Kanuri; Karai-karai; Mafa; Mambila; Margi South; Margi; Mumuye; Ngizim; Nigerian Sign Language; Saya (Zaar); Shuwa Arabic; Tangale; Tera; Tiv; Wapan; Warji; Yedina

The six geopolitical zones of Nigeria.

The North East (often hyphenated to the North-East) is one of the six geopolitical zones of Nigeria representing both a geographic and political region of the country's northeast. It comprises six states – Adamawa, Bauchi, Borno, Gombe, Taraba, and Yobe.

Geographically, the North East is the largest geopolitical zone in the nation, covering nearly one-third of Nigeria's total area. In terms of the environment, the zone is primarily divided between the semi-desert Sahelian savanna and the tropical West Sudanian savanna ecoregions.

The region has a population of about 26 million people, around 12% of the total population of the country with Fulani and Kanuri as the major tribes along with other small ethnic groups. Maiduguri and Bauchi are the most populous cities in the North East as well as the fifteenth and seventeenth most populous cities in Nigeria. Other large northeastern cities include (in order by population) Bauchi, Yola, Mubi, Gombe, Jimeta, Potiskum, Jalingo, Gashua, and Bama.

It is known for its livestock and the growth of crops which contribute greatly to the economy of the country. The region is not as densely populated as compared to the southern region of the country.
