= Ganye =

- LGA and town

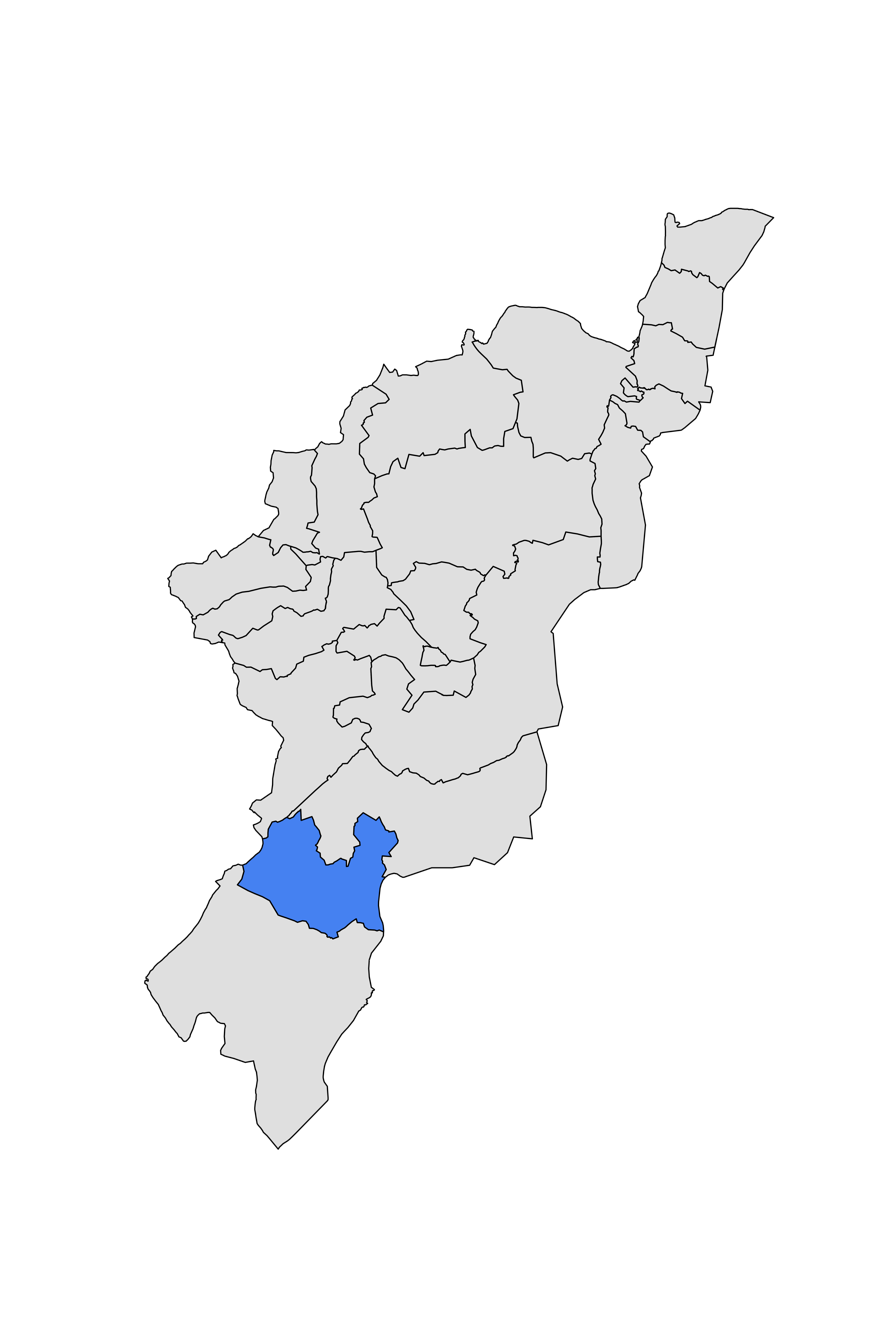
- Map of Adamawa State highlighting Ganye
- Interactive map of Ganye
- Location within Nigeria
- Coordinates: 8°26′N 12°4′E
- Country: Nigeria
- State: Adamawa State

Area
  - Total: 2,095 km^{2} (809 sq mi)

Population (2022)
  - Total: 262,100
  - Density: 125.1/km^{2} (324.0/sq mi)
- Time zone: UTC+1 (WAT)

Ganye is a town and Local Government Area of Adamawa State, Nigeria. Jada and Toungo Local Governments were carved out from Ganye local government areas of Adamawa State. Ganye is bordered by Jada Local Government Area to the North and East, Toungo Local Government Area to the South and Taraba State to the West. It is the headquarter of the Sama (Chamba) people worldwide.

== History ==
Ganye Local Government Area is one of the major Local Government Areas of Adamawa State with Mubi and Numan. The major and ruling tribe of Ganye is the Sama (Chamba) Language with other tribes such as Fulani and Mummuye and others.

== Demography ==
=== Languages ===
In a 2023 demographic survey of Internally displaced persons (IDPs), the most predominant languages (spoken at homes and places of primary residence) present in the local government area were; Chamba Donga – 54.2%, Fulfulde, specifically Eastern or Adamawa Fulfulde – 24.0%, Hausa – 5.8%, Bachama/Bwatiye – 3.4%, English – 1.9%, Kamwe – 1.7%, Marghi – 1.2%, Dera (Kanakuru) – 1.0%, Longuda – 1.0%, Jukun – 1.0%, Glavda – 1.0%, Kanuri – 1.0%, Bura – 1.0% and four other languages spoken by populations with 0.5% each. This data was not obtained from a nationally co-ordinated population headcount. The last time Nigeria included ethnic and linguistic data in its enumeration parameters was in the national census of 1963.

== The Ruler ==
The Paramount ruler of Ganye is a First Class traditional ruler: Alh.Umaru Adamu Sanda OON (Gangwari Ganye II).

== Major Villages ==
Major villages in Ganye include Sugu, Gurum and Jaggu.

== Climate ==
In Ganye, the wet season is heavy and overcast, the dry season is partly cloudy, and it is hot all year. Throughout the year, the temperature ranges from 61 °F to 96 °F, with temperatures rarely falling below 55 °F or rising over 102 °F.

The soil of Ganye is the loamy type which makes it the hub of agriculture and earned it the title of 'the food basket of the state. The Local Government Area experience two seasons of Rains and dryness. Rainy season begins in Ganye as early as March and terminates in October. Ganye Local Government Area is drained by River Dadonu which takes it source from the Jangani mountains.

=== Temperature ===
From February 24 to April 23 (2.0 months), the hot season lasts, with an average daily high temperature of over 93 °F. April is the hottest month in Ganye, with an average high temperature of 94 °F and low temperature of 76 °F.

From June 18 to September 27, the cold season, which has an average daily high temperature below 85 °F, lasts for 3.3 months. With an average low of 62 °F and high of 86 °F, January is the coldest month of the year in Ganye.

=== Cloud ===
The average proportion of sky that is covered by clouds in Ganye varies significantly seasonally throughout the year.

Beginning about October 23 and lasting for 4.6 months, the clearer time of the year in Ganye ends around March 10.

In Ganye, January is the clearest month of the year, with the sky remaining clear, mostly clear, or partly overcast 49% of the time.

Beginning about March 10 and lasting for 7.4 months, the cloudier period of the year ends around October 23.

May is the cloudiest month of the year in Ganye, with the sky being overcast or mostly cloudy 81% of the time on average.

=== Precipitation ===
A day that has at least 0.04 inches of liquid or liquid-equivalent precipitation is considered to be wet. In Ganye, the likelihood of rainy days fluctuates wildly throughout the year.

In the 6.1-month-long wetter season, which runs from April 17 to October 22, there is a more than 45% probability that any given day would be rainy. With an average of 26.9 days with at least 1.0 millimetre (0.04 inches) of precipitation, August has the most rainy days in Ganye.

From October 22 to April 17, or 5.9 months, is the dry season. With an average of no days with at least 1.0 millimetre (0.04 inches) of precipitation, January is the month with the fewest wet days in Ganye.

We categorize rainy days into those that only involve rain, those that only involve snow, and those that combine the two. With an average of 26.9 days, August is the month in Ganye with the most rainy days. This classification shows that rain alone is the most frequent type of precipitation throughout the year, with a high likelihood of 89% on September 9.
