= Kwada Joseph Ayuba =

Nigerian politician

Member of the Adamawa State House of Assembly
- Constituency: Michika Constituency

Personal details
- Born: Adamawa State, Nigeria
- Occupation: Politician

Kwada Joseph Ayuba is a Nigerian politician who currently serves as the representative for the Michika constituency at the Adamawa State House of Assembly.
