= A13 highway (Nigeria) =

Road in Nigeria

Coordinates: 10.987072°N 13.671065°E

Location
- Country: Nigeria

Highway system
- Transport in Nigeria

The A13 highway is a highway in Nigeria. It runs from Jimeta on the Benue River in Adamawa State north, close to the eastern border of the country, to join the A4 highway near Bama in Borno State.
