= Awwal Tukur =

Nigerian politician and lawyer

Secretary to the Government of Adamawa State
- Incumbent
- Assumed office 2023
- Governor: Ahmadu Fintiri
- Constituency: Yola North/Yola South/Girei

Member of the House of Representatives of Nigeria
- In office 1999–2003

Personal details
- Party: People's Democratic Party
- Education: LL.B. (Hons.)
- Occupation: Lawyer, politician, businessman
- Known for: Secretary to the Government of Adamawa State

Awwal Tukur is a Nigerian politician and lawyer who was a member of the Nigerian National Assembly from 1999 to 2003. He studied at the University of Birmingham in London and obtained his LL.B (Hons). He was called to the Nigerian Bar in 1988.

Awwal was appointed as the Secretary to the State Government of Adamawa in 2023. He is the son of Bamanga Tukur.
