= Lamurde Hot Spring =

Nigeria Tourist Centre

Lamurde Hot Spring, also known as Ruwan Zafi, is one of the tourist centres in Nigeria. It is located in Lamurde about 103 km (64 mi) from Yola, the capital of Adamawa state, Northeastern Nigeria

== Overview ==
The Lamurde hot spring which the natives call ‘Ruwan Zafi’ means ‘Hot water’. It is above 50C at its hottest spot. From far sight, it looks like any other spring till you dip your legs into it. This hot spring is part of the world's popular Sukur Cultural Landscape, which consists of a palace, villages, and the remains of an iron industry. The place was designated a UNESCO World Heritage site in 1999 and has since become one of the top tourist destinations in Nigeria.

== Healing Power ==
Though the earth heats up water and pushes it out to the surface, the locals still believed that the hot spring possesses healing power that can cure diseases. Many people have come to experience the charms of the hot spring and return another day to do it all over again. The Gyakan and almost everybody in the local government is proud of their ancient spring.
