= Dumne =

Village in Adamawa, Nigeria

Coordinates: 9°47′12″N 12°24′00″E

Dumne is a village in Adamawa State, Nigeria. Yola, the capital of Adamawa, is approximately 64 kilometres (40 mi) from Dumne. The distance from Dumne to Nigeria's capital, Abuja, is approximately 547 kilometres (340 mi).
