= Belel, Nigeria =

Belel
- Town
- Location in Nigeria
- Coordinates: 9.623°N 13.231°E
- Country: Nigeria
- State: Adamawa State
- LGA: Maiha
- Founded: 1830

Government
  - Type: Ward
  - Lamdo: Abubakar
- Time zone: UTC+1 (WAT)

Belel is a town in Maiha in the Nigerian state of Adamawa. It is located near the Nigeria-Cameroon border. It was founded in 1830 by Shuwa immigrants from Waloji in Bornu during the reign of Modibbo Adama. These immigrants reportedly 'obtained the peaceful submission' of the Bata communities around the area. Belel leaders started using the title 'Lamdo' from The Belel's eldest son and Successor Umaru.
