= Church of the Brethren in Nigeria =

EYN Anabaptist denomination

The Church of the Brethren in Nigeria (Hausa: Ekklesiyar Yan'uwa a Nigeria (EYN), literally "Church of Children of the Same Mother of Nigeria") is an Anabaptist Christian denomination from Nigeria with close to 1,000,000 members. It has hundreds of pastors and hundreds of parishes. It has been established in the 20th century. The Church of the Brethren in Nigeria has bible colleges and schools. It joined the World Council of Churches in 1985. Furthermore, it is a member of the Christian Council of Nigeria and the Christian Association of Nigeria. The Church of the Brethren in Nigeria is the largest national body of Church of the Brethren in the world.

EYN buildings in Maiduguri were destroyed by Boko Haram as a part of 2009 Nigerian sectarian violence.

== See also ==
- Christianity in Nigeria
