= Shelleng =

- LGA and town
- Interactive map of Shelleng
- Location within Nigeria
- Coordinates: 9°53′5″N 12°0′32″E
- Country: Nigeria
- State: Adamawa State

Area
  - Total: 1,381 km^{2} (533 sq mi)

Population (2022)
  - Total: 229,000
  - Density: 166/km^{2} (429/sq mi)
- Time zone: UTC+1 (WAT)

Shelleng is a town and Local Government Area (LGA) of Adamawa State, North-east Nigeria.

The LGA shares borders with Guyuk, Demsa, Gombi, and Song LGAs of Adamawa State and Shani LGA in Borno State. Shelleng Local Government Area is made up of various Districts, Towns and villages such as Kiri, Bodwai, Gundo, Jumbul, Shelleng, Bakta, Ketembere, Dumne, Gwapopolok, and Talum. Shelleng Local government has an estimated population of 590,671 inhabitants with the area consisting members of varying ethnic group such as the Kanakuru (Dera), Fulani, Lala, Kiri, and the Bura. The Bura language is one of the spoken languages in Shelleng LGA while the religions of Christianity and Islam are commonly practiced in the area. Popular festivals celebrated in Shelleng LGA include the Mendamo festival while the landmarks in the area include the Kiri Dam and the Shelleng Cottage Hospital.

== Demography ==
In a 2023 demographic survey of Internally displaced persons (IDPs), the local government was found to be predominantly Hausa and Dera (Kanakuru) speaking. The most commonly reported languages (spoken at homes and places of primary residence) present in the local government area were; Hausa – 34.8%, Kanakuru (Dera) –31.2% and Fulfulde, specifically Eastern or Adamawa Fulfulde – 12.1%. Other languages included; Lala-Roba – 7.2%, Karekare – 6.4%, Waja – 3.0%, Lamunkhin – 3.0% and three other languages spoken by populations around 0.5% each. This data was not obtained from a nationally co-ordinated population headcount. The last time Nigeria included ethnic and linguistic data in its enumeration parameters was in the national census of 1963.

== Geography ==
Shelleng local government covers a total area of 1,359 square kilometres and has an average temperature of 32 °C. It lies along the Lake Chad Basin and has the Kiri and Gongola River flowing through its territory.

== Economy ==
Fishing, farming, trading of livestocks and animal rearing are economic activities with domestic animals such as cows, goats, rams, and horses reared and sold in large quantities within the area. The LGA is also home to a vibrant trade sector, hosting several markets such as kasuwan jun ma’a (friday market) and kasuwan kiri (kiri market) where a wide variety of commodities are bought and sold. Other economic activities undertaken by the people of Shelleng LGA include hunting, pottery and crafts making. The Kiri Dam is used for supplying water for agriculture in the area and aides fishing.

== Climate ==
The rainy season in Shelleng is hot, humid, and cloudy, whereas the dry season is hot and partially cloudy. Throughout the year, the temperature ranges from 62 °F to 103 °F, with temperatures rarely falling below 57 °F or rising over 108 °F.

From February 24 to April 24, which is the start of the hot season, there are two months with daily highs that are above 38 °C (100 °F) on average. With an average high temperature of 38 °C (101 °F) and low temperature of 27 °C (80 °F), April is the hottest month of the year in Shelleng.

From June 22 to October 5, the cool season, which has an average daily high temperature below 32 °C (90 °F), lasts for 3.5 months. With an average low of 17 °C (63 °F) and high of 33 °C (92 °F), December is the coldest month of the year in Shelleng.
