= Nzanyi language =

Chadic language spoken in West Africa

Nzanyi
- Native to: Nigeria, Cameroon
- Region: Adamawa State
- Native speakers: (86,000 cited ca. 1993)
- Language family: Afro-Asiatic: Chadic; Biu–Mandara; Bata (A.8); Nzanyi

Language codes
- ISO 639-3: nja
- Glottolog: nzan1240

- Person: Nzangi
- People: Nzanyi

Nzanyi (also known as Njanyi, Nzangi, Njai, Njeny, Zani, Zany, Jeng, Jenge, Njei, Njeing, Kobotshi) is an Afro-Asiatic language spoken in Nigeria in Adamawa State in Maiha LGA, and along the border in Cameroon. Dialects are Dede, Hoode, Lovi, Magara, Maiha, Mutidi, Nggwoli, Pakka, and Rogede.

In Cameroon, Njanyi is spoken near the Nigerian border in the Doumo area (Mayo-Oulo commune, Mayo-Louti department, and in Dembo and Basheo communes, Bénoué department, Northern Region) by about 9,000 speakers. It is mainly spoken in Nigeria.
