= Maiha =

Maiha Jalingo Maiha Mayo Nguli
- LGA and town
- Nickname: Jalingo Maiha
- Motto: (Allah accu gondal)
- Map of Adamawa State highlighting Maiha
- Interactive map of Maiha
- Location within Nigeria
- Coordinates: 9°59′44″N 13°13′5″E
- Country: Nigeria
- State: Adamawa State

Area
  - Total: 1,346 km^{2} (520 sq mi)

Population (2022)
  - Total: 169,900
  - Density: 126.2/km^{2} (326.9/sq mi)
- Time zone: UTC+1 (WAT)

Maiha is a town and Local Government Area of Adamawa State, Nigeria, adjacent to the border with Cameroon.

== Geography ==
The area experiences two major seasons, the dry and the wet, with an average temperature of 32 degrees Celsius or 89.6 degrees Fahrenheit in Maiha Local Government Area. According to estimates, the Local Government Area's average humidity is 24 percent and its average wind speed is 11 km/h (6.8 mph; 10 ft/s).

=== Climate ===
The rainy season in Maiha is oppressive and overcast, the dry season is partly cloudy, and it is hot all year. Throughout the year, the temperature normally ranges from 16 °C (60 °F) to 38 °C (100 °F), with temperatures rarely falling below 13 °C (55 °F) or rising over 41 °C (106 °F).

== Languages ==
In a 2022 demographic survey of Internally displaced persons (IDPs), the most predominant languages (spoken at homes and places of primary residence) spoken in the local government area were; Fulfulde, specifically Eastern or Adamawa Fulfulde – 65.6%, Hausa – 26.9%, Marghi – 4.7%, Nzanyi – 1.4%, Janji – 0.9% and English – 0.5%. This data was not obtained from a nationally co-ordinated headcount. The last time Nigeria included ethnic and linguistic data in its enumeration parameters was in the national census of 1963.

== Economy ==
In Maiha Local Government Area, a variety of economic activities are carried out, with agriculture being the primary economic activity for the majority of local residents. The Local Government Area also raises and sells certain animals in addition to growing a variety of vegetables. Crafts, ceramics, and hunting are some of the residents of Maiha Local Government Area's other significant economic pursuits.

== Localities ==
Towns and villages in Maiha

- Aiwa
- Bafere
- Bakawo
- Bakawo Majeken
- Belel
- Betengi
- Buda Manga
- Bungel
- Manga
- Gerete
- Humbutudi
- Kwagor Ngula
- Maiha
- Maiha Gari
- Manjekin
- Mayo Nguli
- Sorau
- Sorau A
- Sorau B
- Nduku
- Wuro Usmanu
- Wuro Alhaji
- Wafango
- Konkol ward.
