= Adamawa cattle =

Breed of cattle

Adamawa are a breed of cattle indigenous to Adamawa, Nigeria. They are a multipurpose breed, used as a draught animal and for beef and dairy production. The breed makes up 2% of Nigeria's total herd. Individuals are medium to large, with medium size horns curled in a crescent shape. They look similar to White Fulani or Bunaji, but their hump is pendulous in shape, differentiating them from White Fulani.
