= Gombi =

LGA and town in Adamawa State, Nigeria

Gombi Balda
- LGA and town
- Interactive map of Gombi
- Location within Nigeria
- Coordinates: 10°9′44″N 12°44′24″E
- Country: Nigeria
- State: Adamawa State

Area
  - Total: 2,312 km^{2} (893 sq mi)

Population (2022)
  - Total: 227,900
  - Density: 98.57/km^{2} (255.3/sq mi)
- Time zone: UTC+1 (WAT)

Gombi is a town and a local government area in Adamawa State, Nigeria.

"The area has been attacked in the past by Boko Haram and the region has been under a military state of emergency since May 2013."

In July 2014, a German development worker was kidnapped in the town of Gombi.

== Climate ==
In Gombi, the wet season is oppressive and overcast, the dry season is partly cloudy, and it is hot all year. Throughout the year, the temperature ranges from 59 °F to 101 °F, with temperatures rarely falling below 54 °F or rising over 106 °F.

=== Hot season ===
With an average daily high temperature above 97 °F, the hot season lasts for 2.0 months, from March 1 to May 1. With an average high of 99 °F and low of 77 °F, April is the hottest month of the year in Gombi.

=== Cool season ===
From June 24 to October 2, the cool season, which has an average daily high temperature below 87 °F, lasts for 3.3 months. With an average low of 60 °F and a high of 88 °F, December is the coldest month of the year in Gombi.

=== Cloud cover ===
The average proportion of sky covered by clouds in Gombi varies significantly seasonally throughout the year.

Around October 26 marks the start of Gombi's clearer season, which lasts for 4.5 months and ends around March 8.

In Gombi, January is the clearest month of the year, with the sky remaining clear, mostly clear, or partly cloudy 56% of the time on average.

Beginning around March 8 and lasting about 7.5 months, the cloudier period of the year ends around October 26.

The month with the greatest clouds in Gombi is May, when the sky is cloudy or mostly cloudy 78% of the time on average.
