= Jimeta =

Jimeta Yola
- Nickname: JMT
- Location in Yola Nigeria
- Coordinates: 9°16′45″N 12°26′45″E
- Country: Nigeria
- State: Adamawa State
- LGA: Yola North

Population (1991)
  - Total: 73,080
- Climate: Aw

Jimeta is a town in Yola, Adamawa State, Nigeria. The town's population was 73,080 in 1991. The elevation of Jimeta is 135 m (443 ft), and it lies along the Benue River.

Jimeta and nearby Yola, the state capital of Adamawa have interconnected histories, and between 1935 and 1955, it were unified as one town. Jimeta also serves as Yola's port and it also contains Yola's airport. Some refer to the two as "Jimeta Yola."

== Climate ==
Jimeta located at sea level and has a Tropical savanna climate with dry winter (Köppen climate classification Aw). The region's yearly average temperature is 32.71 °C (90.88 °F) and it is 3.25% higher than Nigeria's midpoints. Jimeta commonly gets around 122.5 mm (4.82 inches) of precipitation and has 147 blustery days (40% of the time) every year.

== Serious flooding in Jimeta, August, 2012 ==
Serious flooding has hit Jimeta - Yola in Adamawa State after a weighty storm in the North-Eastern Territory of Nigeria yesterday.

Many individuals have been rendered destitute by the assaulting floods. The most recent flooding impacted the Doubeli area of Jimeta and the water level was all the while ascending as at the hour of documenting this report.

The flood has reached knee-level in certain areas and occupants are battling to adapt to the staggering effect on their lives.

The brief asylums set up to give help have made cleanliness challenges,

The flooding has additionally destroyed numerous farmlands nearby, leaving occupants without their essential means of revenue.

The continuous flooding has dislodged many residents who are now battling to adapt to the effect on their livelihood.

As per the National Emergency Management Agency (NEMA), in a press explanation gave to newsmen on Saturday, the floods have lowered ranches and houses and great many occupants have been compelled to empty for wellbeing.

Following weighty storm on Friday in Adamawa State, which brought about floods, the circumstance has provoked for critical national government mediation.

The flood was occasioned by the progressive arrival of water from the Lagdo Dam in the Cameroon Republic.

The NEMA added that cooperative endeavors with its Yola office and the Adamawa State Emergency Management Agency (ADSEMA) and pertinent partners have been set up to screen the heightening water levels.
