= Toungo, Nigeria =

Toungo
- LGA and town
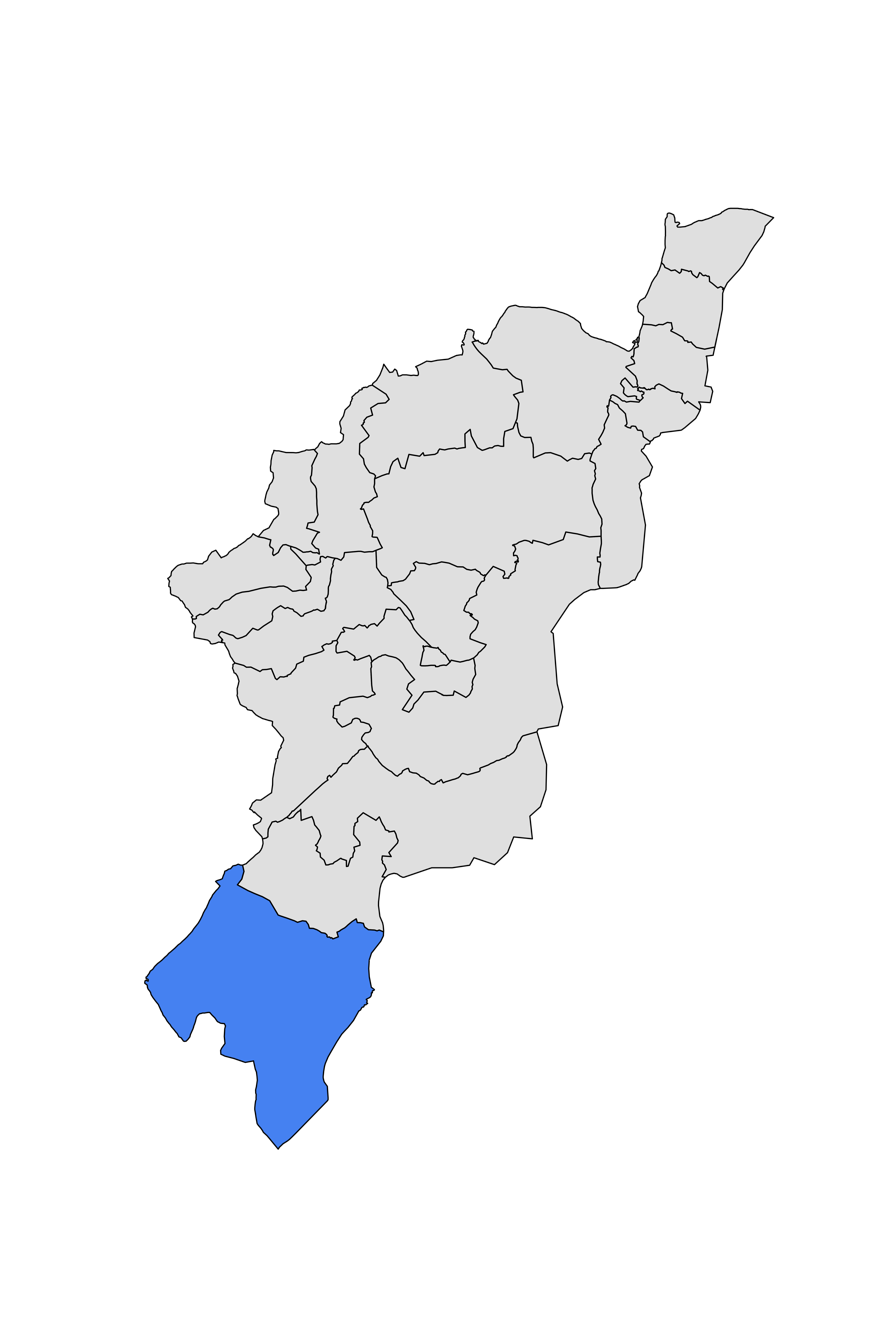
- Map of Adamawa State highlighting Toungo
- Interactive map of Toungo
- Location within Nigeria
- Coordinates: 8°7′N 12°3′E
- Country: Nigeria
- State: Adamawa State

Area
  - Total: 5,646 km^{2} (2,180 sq mi)

Population (2022)
  - Total: 80,500
  - Density: 14.3/km^{2} (36.9/sq mi)
- Time zone: UTC+1 (WAT)

Toungo is a town and Local Government Area of Adamawa State, Nigeria.

== Demography ==
In a 2023 demographic survey of Internally displaced persons (IDPs), the local government was found to be majorly Fulfulde and Chamba speaking. The most commonly reported languages (spoken at homes and places of primary residence) present in the local government area were; Fulfulde, specifically Eastern or Adamawa Fulfulde – 41.2%, Chamba Donga – 32.8% and Hausa – 15.4%. Other languages included; Mumuye – 3.6%, English – 2.1%, Longuda – 1.0%, Kanuri – 2.8%, Waja – 0.9%, Marghi – 0.9% and Tiv – 0.5%. This data was not obtained from a nationally co-ordinated population headcount. The last time Nigeria included ethnic and linguistic data in its enumeration parameters was in the national census of 1963.

== Climate ==
Toungo has a tropical wet and dry or savanna climate and is zero metres/feet above sea level (Aw classification). The district averages a yearly temperature of 32.97 °C (91.35 °F), which is 3.51% higher than the national average for Nigeria. Toungo generally experiences 147.68 wet days (40.46% of the time) and receives about 123.47 millimetres (4.86 inches) of precipitation each year.
