= Adamawa State =

State of Nigeria

Adamawa Lesdi Adamaawa (Adamawa Fulfulde)
- State

Names transcription(s)
  - Fulfulde: لٜسْدِ عَدَمَاوَ 𞤤𞤫𞤧𞤣𞤭 𞤢𞤣𞤢𞤥𞤢𞥄𞤱𞤢
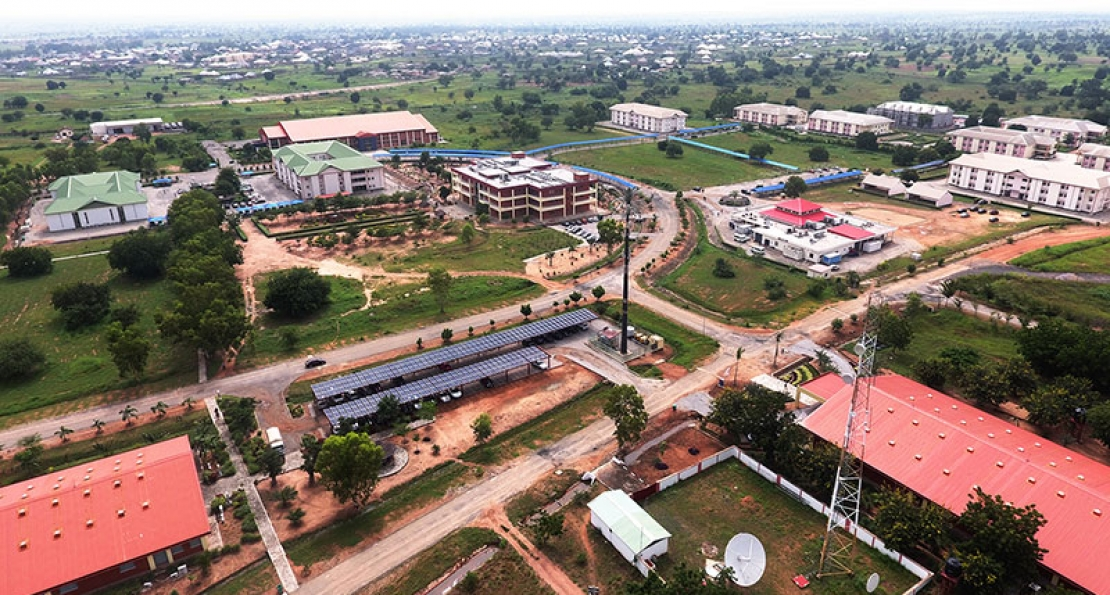

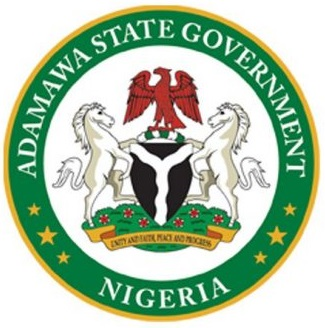
- Flag Seal
- Nicknames: Land of Beauty
- Location of Adamawa State in Nigeria
- Coordinates: 9°20′N 12°30′E
- Country: Nigeria
- Established: 27 August 1991
- Named for: Modibbo Adama
- Capital: Yola

Government
  - Body: Government of Adamawa State
  - Governor: Ahmadu Fintiri (APC)
  - Deputy Governor: Kaletapwa Farauta (PDP)
  - Legislature: State House of Assembly
  - Speaker of State Assembly: Wesley Bathiya (PDP)
  - National Assembly delegation: Senators: N: Amos Yohanna (PDP); C: Aminu Iya Abbas (PDP); S: Binos Dauda Yaroe (PDP); Representatives: List

Area
  - Total: 36,917 km^{2} (14,254 sq mi)
  - Rank: 8th of 36
- Highest elevation (Mount Dimlang): 2,042 m (6,699 ft)

Population (2006)
  - Total: 3,178,950
  - Estimate (2022): 4,902,100
  - Rank: 24th of 36
  - Density: 86.111/km^{2} (223.03/sq mi)

GDP (PPP)
  - Year: 2021
  - Total: ₦2.66 trillion 21st of 36
  - Per capita: $1,341; 21st of 36
- Time zone: UTC+1 (GMT)
- Postal code: 640001
- Geocode: NG-AD
- Official language: English; Hausa; Fulani
- HDI (2022): 0.539 low · 25th of 37
- Website: www.adamawastate.gov.ng

Adamawa is a state in the North-East geopolitical zone of Nigeria, bordered by Borno to the northwest, Gombe to the west, and Taraba to the southwest while its eastern border forms part of the national border with Cameroon. It takes its name from the historic emirate of Adamawa, with the emirate's old capital of Yola serving as the capital city of Adamawa State. The state was formed in 1991 when the former Gongola State was broken up into Adamawa and Taraba states. The state is one of the most heterogeneous in Nigeria, having over 100 indigenous ethnic groups.

Of the 36 states, Adamawa is the eighth largest in the area, but the thirteenth least populous with an estimated population of about 4.25 million as of 2016. Geographically, the state is mainly composed of highlands and mountains (the Atlantika, Mandara, and the Shebshi ranges) and the Adamawa Plateau crossed by valleys and rivers, most notably the Benue and Gongola rivers. The lowlands of Adamawa are all part of the West Sudanian savanna in the north and the wetter Guinean forest-savanna mosaic in parts of the south, while elevated areas are parts of the Mandara Plateau mosaic and Cameroonian Highlands forests ecoregions. In the extreme south of the state is part of the Gashaka Gumti National Park, a large wildlife park that contains large populations of bushbuck, African buffalo, patas monkey, black-and-white colobus, giant pangolin, and hippopotamus along with some of Nigeria's last remaining Nigeria-Cameroon chimpanzee, African leopard, and African golden cat populations.

What is now known as Adamawa state has been inhabited for years by various ethnic groups, including the Verre, Tsobo, Bwatiye (Bachama), Bali, Bata (Gbwata), Gudu, Mbula-Bwazza, and Nungurab (Lunguda) in the central region; the Kamwe in the north and central region; the Jibu in the far south; the Kilba, Mafa, Marghi, and Waga in the north, and the Kwah [Bah], Mumuye in the south while the Fulani live throughout the state, often as nomadic herders. Adamawa is also religiously diverse as about 50% of the population is Sunni Muslim and 40% is Christian (mainly Lutheran, EYN, ECWA, and Pentecostal), while the remaining 10% are adherents of traditional ethnic religions.

As an agriculturally-based state, the Adamawa State economy mainly relies on livestock and crops, such as cotton, groundnuts, millet, cassava, guinea corn, and yams. Due to the Boko Haram insurgency affecting development in the state, Adamawa has the eleventh lowest Human Development Index in the country but as the insurgency has abated since 2016 due to terrorist infighting, development has been renewed.

== History ==
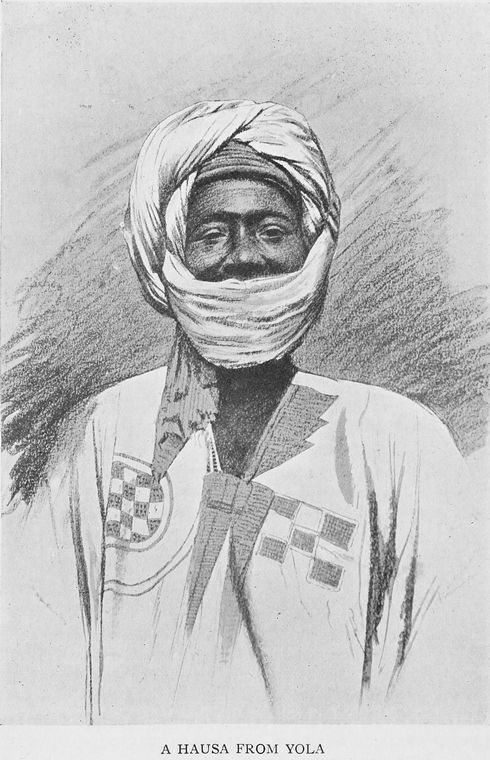
Illustration by Edmund D. Morel titled "A Hausa from Yola" (1902)

Before it became a state in Nigeria, Adamawa was a subordinate kingdom of the Sultanate of Sokoto, which also included much of northern Cameroon. The rulers bear the title of emir ("lamido" in the local language, Fulfulde).

The name "Adamawa" came from the founder of the kingdom, Modibo Adama, a regional leader of the Fulani Jihad organized by Usman dan Fodio of Sokoto in 1804. Modibo Adama came from the region of Gurin (now just a small village) and in 1806, received a green flag for leading the jihad in his native country. In the following years, Adama conquered many lands and tribes. In 1838, he moved his capital to Ribadu, and in 1839, to Joboliwo. In 1841, he founded Yola, where he died in 1848. After the European colonization (first by Germany and then by Britain), the rulers remained as emirs and the line of succession has continued to the present day.

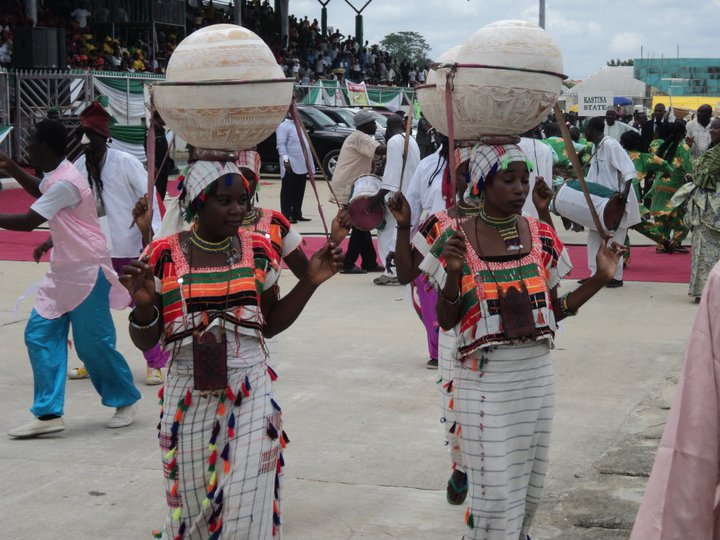
Dancers of Adamawa state in their cultural adornment

In the early 1800s, the Fulani jihad seized much of modern-day Adamawa State and formed the Adamawa Emirate under the Sokoto Caliphate. About 90 years later, forces from Germany and the British Empire defeated the Emirate in the Adamawa Wars and split the area. The British-controlled area (much of the west of modern-day Adamawa) was incorporated into the Northern Nigeria Protectorate which later merged into British Nigeria before becoming independent as Nigeria in 1960. The German-controlled area formed a part of German Kamerun until allied forces invaded and occupied Kamerun during the Kamerun campaign of World War I. After the war, what is now eastern Adamawa State became most of the Northern Cameroons within the British Cameroons until 1961, when a referendum led to a merger with Nigeria.

Originally, modern-day Adamawa State was a part of the post-independence Northern Region until 1967 when the area became part of the North-Eastern State. After the North-Eastern State was split in 1976, Gongola State was formed on 3 February 1976 alongside ten other states. Fifteen years after statehood, Gongola was split with the state's south becoming Taraba State while its north became Adamawa State.

A measles outbreak was reported in an internally displaced persons camp, in January 2015.

=== Boko Haram insurgency ===
Adamawa State has been badly impacted by the Boko Haram insurgency. In January 2012, Boko Haram attacked Gombi, Mubi and Yola. By 2014, the state became home to camps housing an estimated 35,000 internally displaced people, fleeing violence from Boko Haram in locations including Mubi, Madagali, Askira Uba, Bama and Gwoza in the states of Adamawa, Borno, and Yobe. In 2014, an estimate placed the number of IDPs around Yola at 400,000. An attack occurred in Chakawa in 2014. A suicide bombing in Yola in 2015 killed over 30 people. A double suicide bombing in Madagali in 2016 killed over 50 people. Mubi is the worst affected place in Adamawa State, suffering major attacks in 2012, 2014, 2017 and 2018.

Organizations serving the community include the Adamawa Peace Initiative (API) - a group of business, religious, and community leaders - and the Adamawa Muslim Council. The United States Agency for International Development has pledged to provide continuing humanitarian assistance.

On 21–22 February 2020, Boko Haram terrorists launched an attack on homes and churches in Garkida, killing three soldiers and wounding civilians.

== Geography ==
Adamawa is one of the largest states of Nigeria and occupies about 36,917 square kilometres (14,254 mi^{2}). It is bordered by the states of Borno to the northwest, Gombe to the west and Taraba to the southwest. Its eastern border forms the national eastern border with Cameroon.

Topographically, it is a mountainous land crossed by large river valleys – Benue, Gongola, and Yedsarem. The valleys of the Mount Cameroon, Mandara Mountains, and Adamawa Plateau form part of the landscape.

=== Climate ===
Climate data for Adamawa State (2010 – 2020)
| Month | Jan | Feb | Mar | Apr | May | Jun | Jul | Aug | Sep | Oct | Nov | Dec | Year |
|---|---|---|---|---|---|---|---|---|---|---|---|---|---|
| Record high °C (°F) | 45.0 (113.0) | 47.0 (116.6) | 46.0 (114.8) | 47.0 (116.6) | 44.0 (111.2) | 40.0 (104.0) | 40.0 (104.0) | 36.0 (96.8) | 38.0 (100.4) | 41.0 (105.8) | 39.0 (102.2) | 40.0 (104.0) | 47.0 (116.6) |
| Mean daily maximum °C (°F) | 36.5 (97.7) | 39.62 (103.32) | 41.49 (106.68) | 40.85 (105.53) | 37.56 (99.61) | 34.66 (94.39) | 31.77 (89.19) | 30.27 (86.49) | 31.57 (88.83) | 37.08 (98.74) | 34.33 (93.79) | 35.82 (96.48) | 35.96 (96.73) |
| Daily mean °C (°F) | 29.28 (84.70) | 32.13 (89.83) | 34.79 (94.62) | 35.48 (95.86) | 33.27 (91.89) | 30.46 (86.83) | 28.05 (82.49) | 26.71 (80.08) | 24.55 (76.19) | 31.88 (89.38) | 29.99 (85.98) | 29.82 (85.68) | 30.81 (87.46) |
| Mean daily minimum °C (°F) | 17.89 (64.20) | 20.28 (68.50) | 23.81 (74.86) | 26.94 (80.49) | 26.88 (80.38) | 24.33 (75.79) | 22.47 (72.45) | 21.63 (70.93) | 22.15 (71.87) | 22.97 (73.35) | 23.13 (73.63) | 19.89 (67.80) | 22.7 (72.9) |
| Record low °C (°F) | 10.0 (50.0) | 12.0 (53.6) | 16.0 (60.8) | 18.0 (64.4) | 22.0 (71.6) | 19.0 (66.2) | 19.0 (66.2) | 19.0 (66.2) | 19.0 (66.2) | 17.0 (62.6) | 19.0 (66.2) | 12.0 (53.6) | 10.0 (50.0) |
| Average precipitation mm (inches) | 0.0 (0.0) | 0.77 (0.03) | 5.49 (0.22) | 44.27 (1.74) | 155.28 (6.11) | 174.13 (6.86) | 255.25 (10.05) | 378.61 (14.91) | 249.93 (9.84) | 4.56 (0.18) | 116.35 (4.58) | 0.0 (0.0) | 115.39 (4.54) |
| Average precipitation days (≥ 1.0 mm) | 0.0 | 0.27 | 1.55 | 7.09 | 16.36 | 19.64 | 24.55 | 27.82 | 6.8 | 0.64 | 15.55 | 0.0 | 11.5 |
| Average relative humidity (%) | 19.68 | 16.98 | 20.25 | 33.23 | 51.02 | 63.35 | 72.67 | 78.62 | 76.13 | 30.22 | 60.92 | 21.54 | 45.38 |
Source: https://tcktcktck.org/nigeria/adamawa

=== Climate change ===
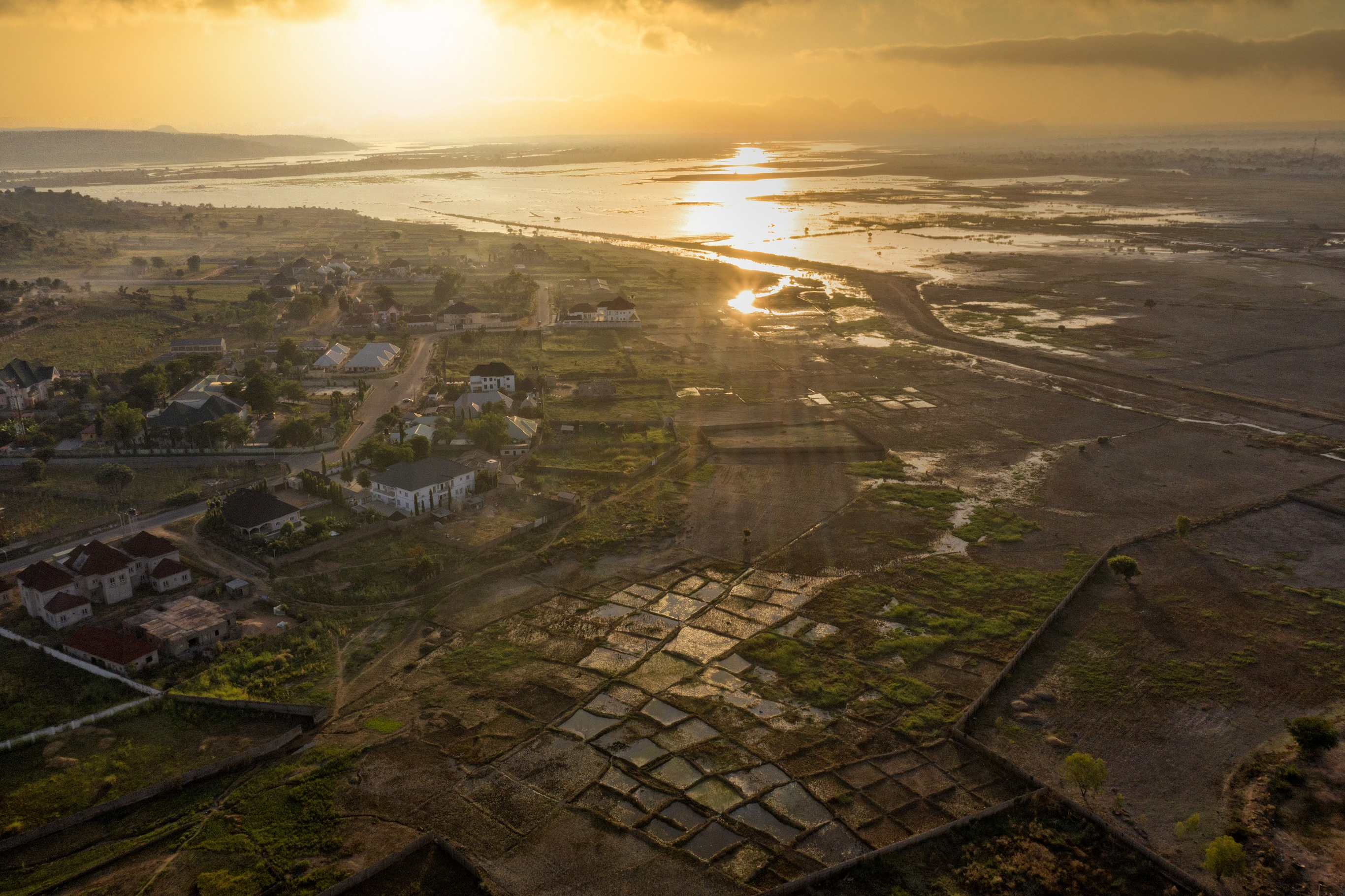
Global warming has had a negative impact on climate and weather patterns as is visible here with the River Gongola flooding some households and farmlands in Yola.

A study conducted on climate in 2012 in Nigeria's Adamawa state revealed monthly mean temperature rise in Gyawana, Yola, and Mubi, while annual rainfall declined. Delays in rainfall and reduced length of fall were observed in these areas.

Contrarily, in recent times, the humidity and temperature of Adamawa state, especially during the dry season, begin to rise in November, which is usually very hot. The harmattan period is experienced between December and February every year.

In recent years, the effect of climate change has begun to be more evident. Tropical wet and dry weather prevails in Adamawa State. The wet season lasts from April to October, whereas the dry season lasts for at least five months (November to March) yearly. An upsurge in rainfall in September in recent years is usually accompanied by floods. According to Dr. Sulieman Muhammad, the Executive Secretary of the Adamawa State Emergency Management Agency ( ADSEMA), 25 people died in September 2022 due to floods brought on by both the overflow of water from the Lagdo Dam in Cameroon due to severe rainfall.

In October 2022, an additional flood claimed 37 lives and submerged 89,000 thousand hectares of farmlands with 58 others sustaining various degrees of injuries.

Flooding in September 2023 killed 5 people. Flooding the next month across 14 out of 21 LGAs in Adamawa caused 33 deaths and displaced 51,043 people. 11 temporary settlements across the LGAs of Yola South, Yola North, Lamude, Madagali, and Demsa were set up to house the internally displaced.

== Economy ==
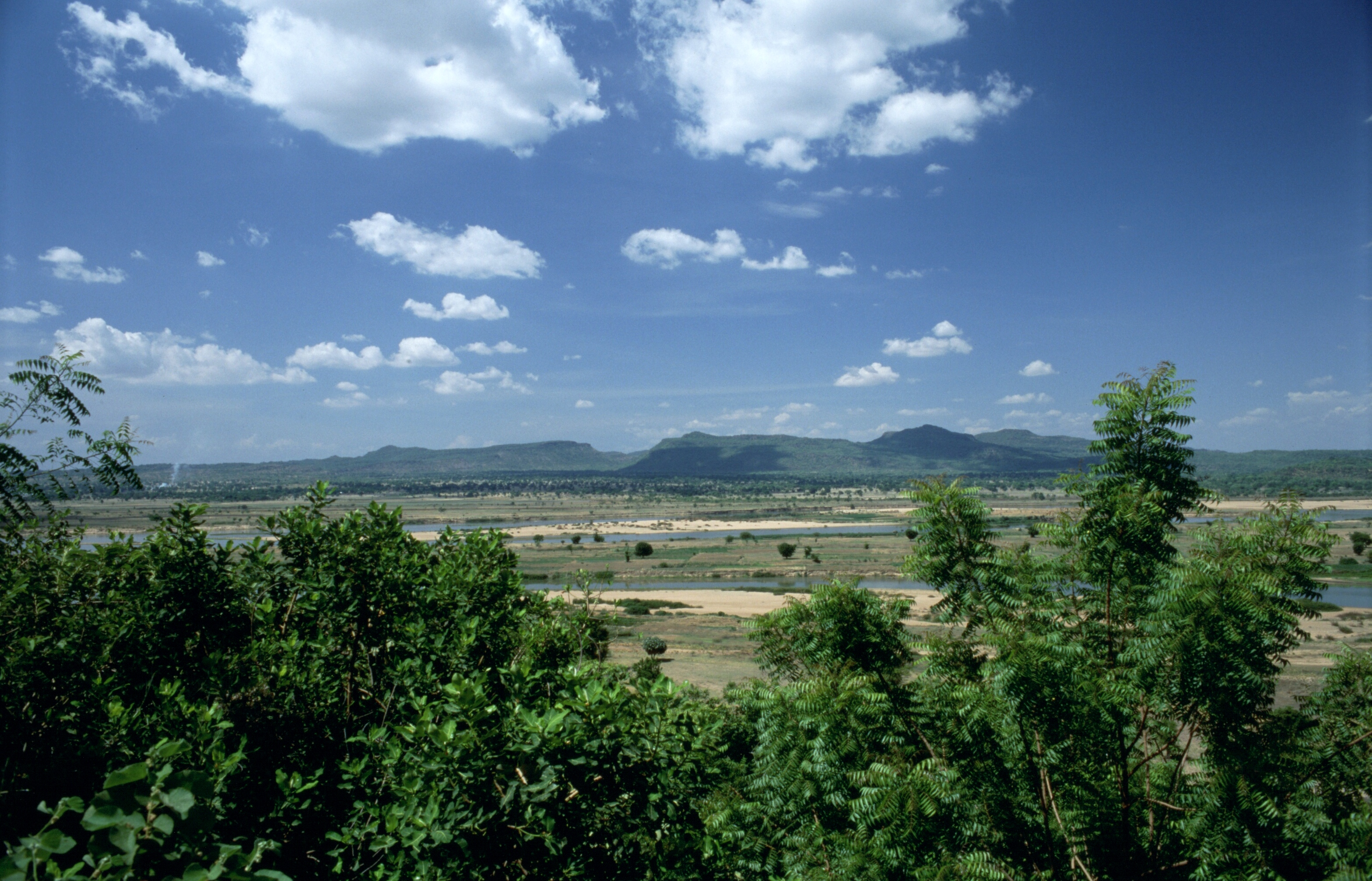
Mandara Mountains from Yola

Adamawa has vast arable land for agriculture, waterfalls and landscape, and solid minerals like limestone, tantalite and kaoline. The GDP of the state is estimated to be ₦2.66 trillion. It has the 18th largest economy among the 36 states of Nigeria and the largest in the North-East region. The total revenue of the state experienced a growth of 9.93% from around ₦700.602 billion in 2020 to ₦777.62 billion in 2021. However, the state heavily depends on federally distributed revenues, with 77.52% of its total revenue being Gross FAAC in 2021. Adamawa had an IGR of ₦8.65 billion in 2021. The state imported $25.02 million worth of goods between 2019 and 2021. It has a debt stock of ₦132.68 billion as of December 2021, ranking the 19th most indebted state in Nigeria and 2nd most indebted in the North-East.

The Dangote group operates a sugar production factory in Numan which has a sugar refining capacity of 3,000 tonnes of cane per day. The company announced plans to expand to factory to a capacity of 6,000tcd, 9,800tcd and to 15,000 tcd. They also plan to increase the size of the factory from 8,700 hectares in 2022 to about 24,200 hectares within seven years.

The markets found in the state are incredibly important to its economic activity and to its inhabitants. These markets, especially its cattle markets, enhanced the development of economic activities in the state, cash crops like groundnut and beans are grown and crops like rice, maize and sorghum are grown as food crops. Around River Yedseram and its tributaries, vegetable gardening in the dry season is practised. Fishing is also very popular in the riverine areas. The breeds of cattle found in Adamawa are; Adamawa Gudali, Sokoto Gudali, White Fulani, Ambala, Red Sokoto and Red Fulani. The state has around 1.5 million cattle and 64 grazing reserves of which 30 are gazetted.

Adamawa state has a thriving livestock industry especially cattle-rearing. It has 2.5 million heads of cattle. Traders come from all over the country and West Africa to buy and sell cattle in its markets, such as the Mubi International cattle market in Mubi South. Despite the state's high level of cattle production, the markets are poorly developed without essential services like meat processing. Meaning, live animals have to be transported in trucks for 4 days before they reach cities with high demand to regions like the South-West, South-South or South-East Nigeria.

The development of many communities in the state can be traced to the colonial era when the Germans ruled a swath of territory known as the Northern and Southern Kameruns from Dikwa in the North to Victoria (Limbe) on the Atlantic coast in the 19th century. These were, however, handed over as United Nations Trust Territories to the British at the end of the World War I with the signing of the Treaty of Versailles. After a series of referendums, the Northern Kameruns joined Nigeria to form the then Sardauna Province and the Southern Kameruns formed a Confederation with French-speaking Cameroon.

== Natural resources ==
- Kaoline
- Bentonite
- Magnesite
- Gypsum

== Transport ==
Federal Highways are:

- A4 north from Taraba State at Mayo Lane via Numan and Shellen to Borno State at Mada,
- A8 Numan Rd east from A4 at Numan 61 km to A13 at Yola Airport, and
- A13 north from A8 at Jimeta across the Benue River via Song, Wuro Hesso, Marraraba, Mubi, Amjawa, Gulak and Mararaba to Borno State near Wagga Lugere.

Other major roads include

- The Gombe-Yola Rd northwest from A4 at Ngbalang via Giwano, Boskeri and Lafia to Gombe State at Yolde,
- The Bambuka-Lafia Rd east from Taraba State near Sarkin Baka and northeast via Lamurde,
- The Visik-Marraraba-Sangere-Manga Rd north from Marraraba to Borno State at Hildi Hills,
- northeast from A13 at Jiberu via Yolde to Belel,
- The Mubi-Maiha-Bungel Rd north from Belel to A13 at Mubi,
- The Ngurore-Ganye Rd south from Wuro Yanka to Mayo Belwa, and
- the Zaridi-Mayo Belwa Rd west to Taraba State at Bisa [Google Maps].

Five roads to Cameroon:

- south from Mayo Belwa via Jada and Tungo at Kontcha,
- at Kojoli to Poli via Tchamba,
- east from Jimeta at Touruoa to Ngong,
- east from Belel via Demsa to Gaschiga on P1 north of Garoua, and
- from Mubi to Boukoula [Google Maps].

Airports:

Yola International near Jimeta.

== Religion ==
Adamawa is a Muslim-majority state in Nigeria, with a substantial Christian population. Historically, Adamawa is home to the major happenings of the Islamic Jihad, led by the Sokoto Caliphate in the early 1800s.

Adamawa is also home to the headquarters of two indigenous churches, the Church of the Brethren in Nigeria (EYN Church) with its headquarters in mararaba Mubi in the northern zone of the state, and the Lutheran Church of Christ in Nigeria (LCCN Church) with headquarters in Numan in the southern zone of the state. The Church of the Brethren in Nigeria (EYN church) was founded in Garkida, Gombi Local Government of the state, in March 1923 by American missionaries. The Lutheran Church of Christ in Nigeria (LCCN Church) was founded in Numan by Dutch missionaries in 1913. 4.5% Catholic with 192,767 followers (2020) in the Diocese of Yola (1950) with 39 parishes under Bishop Stephen Dami Mamza (2011) [https://www.catholic-hierarchy.org/diocese/dyola.html Yola (Diocese) Catholic-Hierarchy. The Anglican Diocese of Yola (1990) with 39 parishes is led by Bishop Markus Ibrahim (2020), also the Archbishop of the Province of Jos Anglican Diocese of Yola.

== Education ==
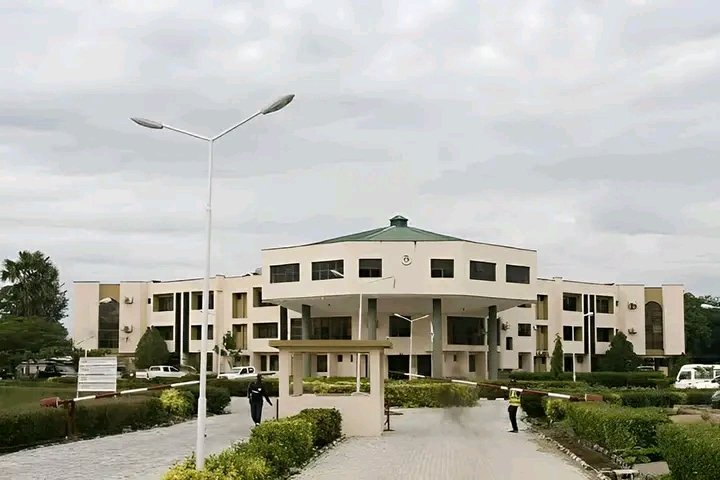
Adamawa State University in Mubi

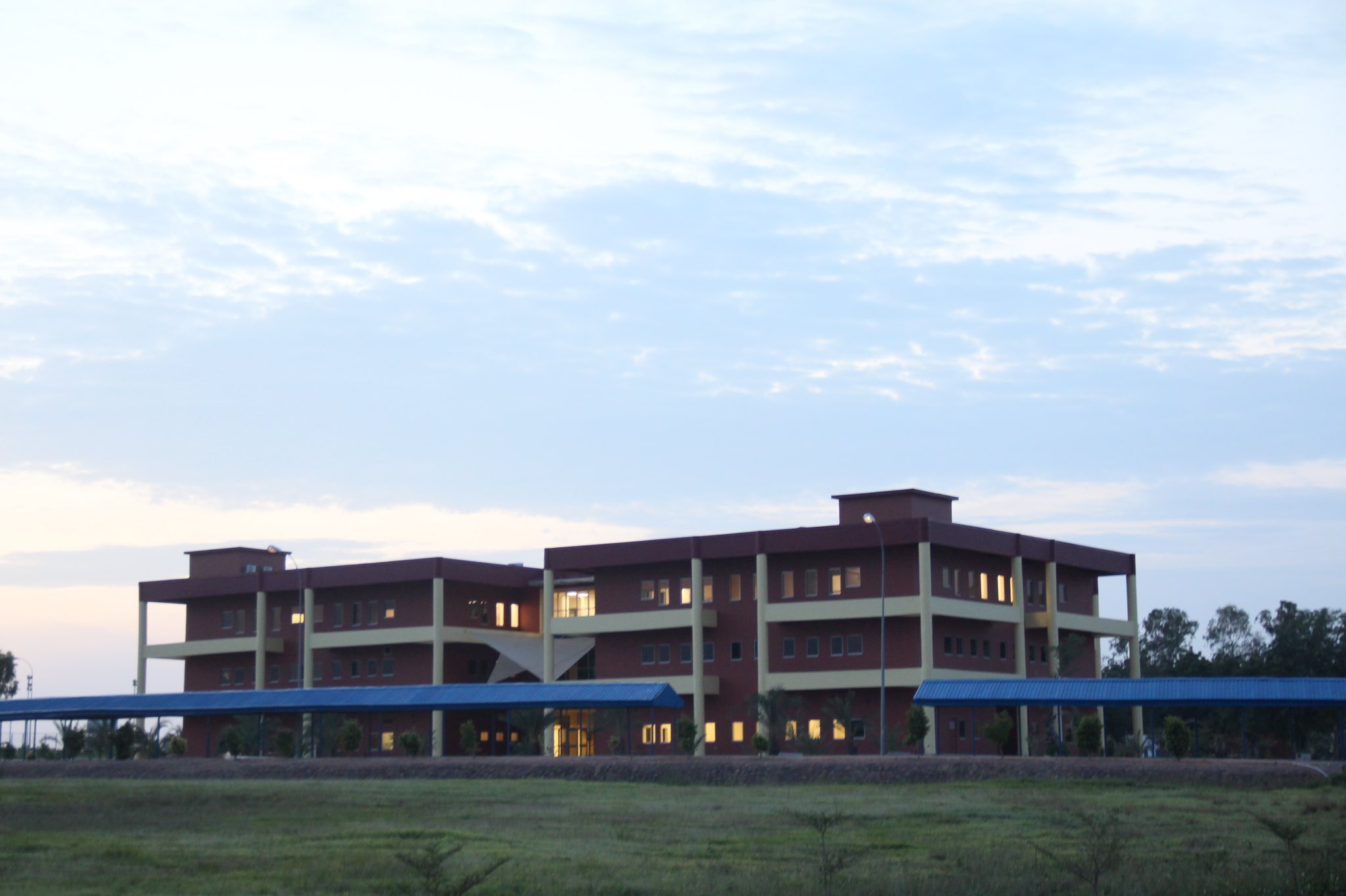
Library in the American University of Nigeria

Tertiary institutions in Adamawa state include:

- Adamawa State Polytechnic, Yola
- Adamawa State University
- American University of Nigeria, Yola
- Federal College of Education, Yola
- Federal Polytechnic, Mubi
- Modibbo Adama University, Yola

== Healthcare ==
Adamawa state has many healthcare sectors that are of different levels, these levels are federal, state and local (grassroot) levels, these include:

=== Primary Healthcare ===
- Basha Health Clinic
- Dowaya Health Post
- Gweda Malam Primary Health Care Center
- Numan maternal and child primary health care
- Sabon Fegi Primary Health Care Center
- Wayam primary health clinic
- Gbalapun primary health clinic
- Vulpi Primary Health Care Center
- Wisdom Primary Health Care
- Bakta Primary Health Care Center
- Kwarhi Health care

=== State Healthcare ===
- General Hospital Numan

== Sites of interest ==
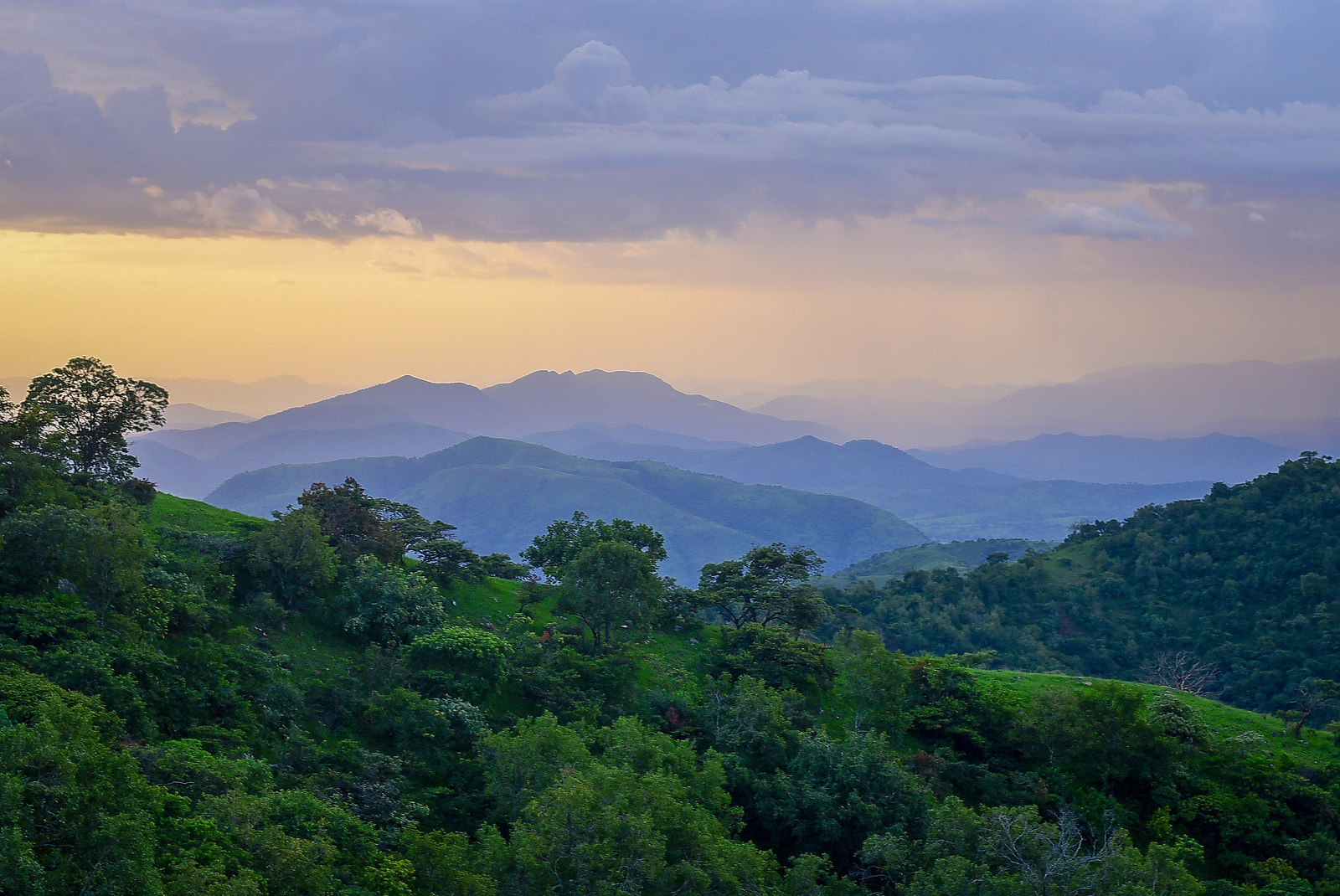
Gashaka-Gumti National Park

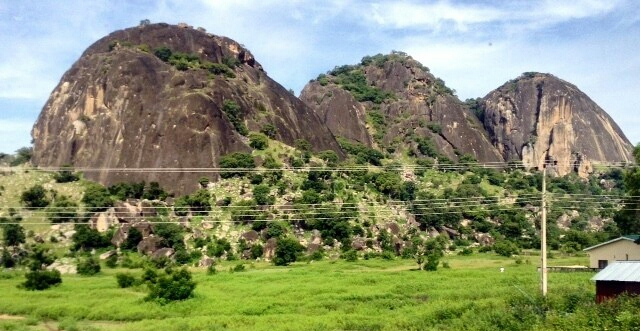
The Three Sisters rock in Song, Adamawa State

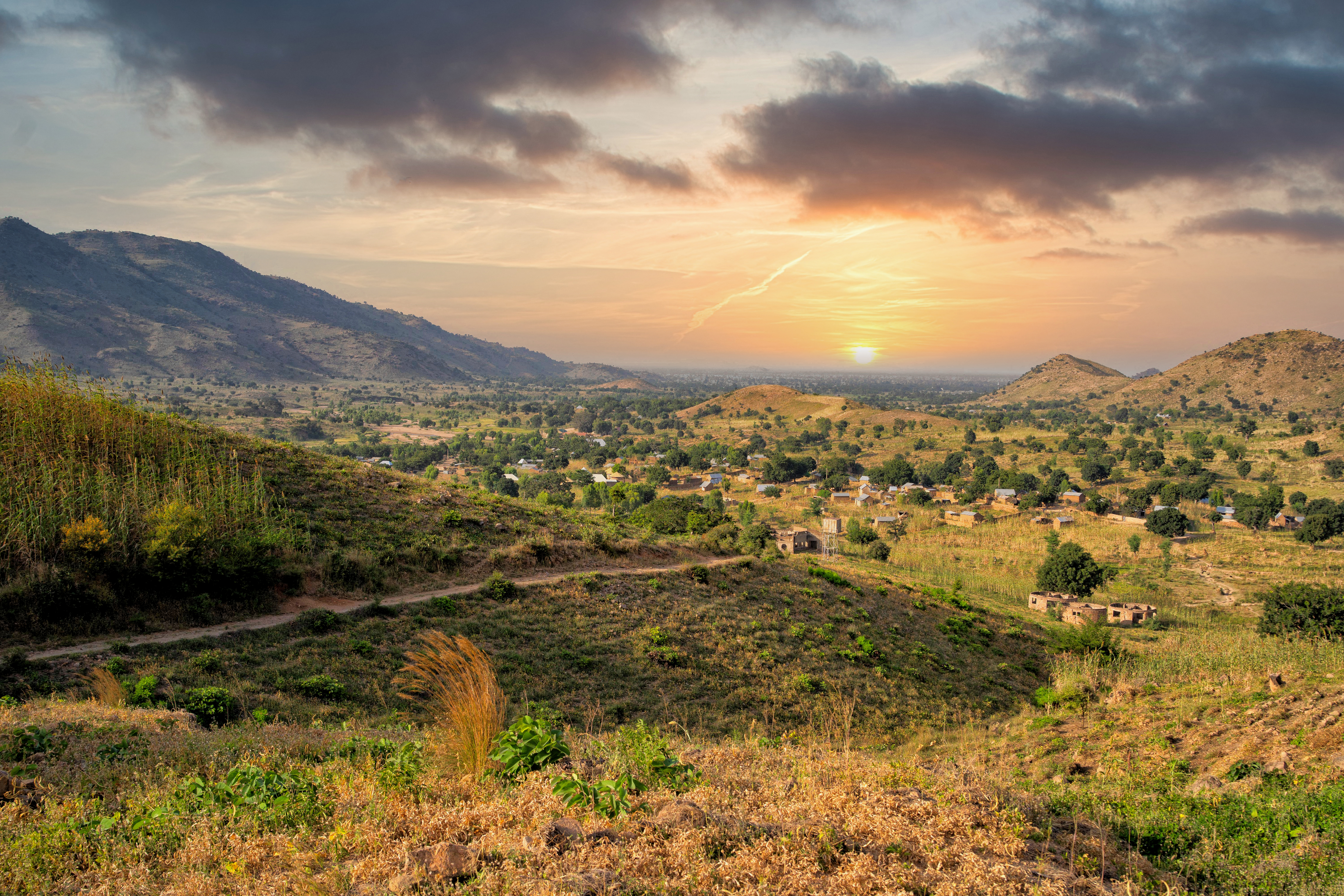

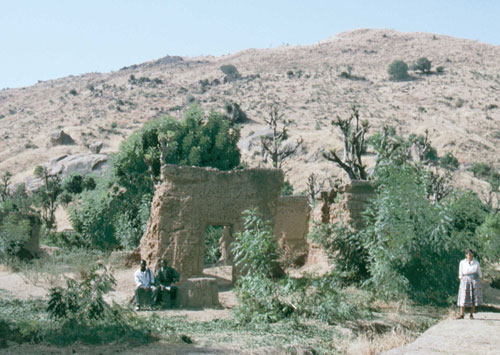
Sukur World Heritage site

- Sukur World Heritage Site in Madagali
- Mandara Mountains at Nigeria-Cameroon border in Maiha
- Kiri Dam in Shelleng
- Ruwan Zafi Spring in Lamurde
- Lamido Muhammadu Barkindo's Palace in Yola
- Mambilla Plateau at the Adamawa-Taraba border in Toungo
- Gashaka Gumti National Park in Toungo
- Shebshi Mountains and Mount Dimlang at the Adamawa-Taraba border in Ganye
- Kamale Mountain Peak in Michika
- Three Sisters Rock in Song
- Sassa Waterfalls in Sassa Village, Toungo
- Yadim Waterfalls in Yadim Village, Fufore
- Fombina Palace Museum in Yola
- The confluence of Rivers Benue and Gongola in Numan Uba under Mubi (Valanyi)

== Administrative divisions ==
=== Local Government Areas ===
Adamawa State consists of twenty-one Local Government Areas (LGAs):

- Demsa
- Fufore
- Ganye
- Girei
- Gombi
- Guyuk
- Hong
- Jada
- Lamurde
- Madagali
- Maiha
- Mayo-Belwa
- Michika
- Mubi North
- Mubi South
- Numan
- Shelleng
- Song
- Toungo
- Yola North (State capital)
- Yola South

=== Traditional states ===
The state has 11 traditional states that cover the state's Local Government Areas, with the largest being the Adamawa Emirate.

| Status | Traditional state | Local Government Areas | Headquarters |
|---|---|---|---|
| First-Class | Adamawa Emirate | Girei, Mayo-Belwa, Song, Yola North, Yola South | Yola |
| First-Class | Ganye Chiefdom | | Ganye |
| First-Class | Mubi Emirate | Mubi North, Mubi South | Mubi |
| First-Class | Numan Chiefdom | | Numan |
| Second-Class | Fufore Emirate | | Fufore |
| Second-Class | Huba Chiefdom | | Hong |
| Second-Class | Madagali Chiefdom | | Gulak |
| Second-Class | Michika Chiefdom | | Michika |
| Third-Class | Gombi Chiefdom | | Gombi |
| Third-Class | Maiha Emirate | | Maiha |
| Third-Class | Yungur Chiefdom | | Dumne |

== Languages ==
Adamawa state is home to many languages due to the state's ethnic diversity. Inter-ethnic communication is mostly done using Fulfulde, Hausa or English. Many of the state's languages are at danger of extinction due to economic, social, political, religious, and contextual factors. Fewer and fewer people are using their ethnic languages in homes.

Languages of Adamawa State listed by LGA:

| LGA | Languages |
|---|---|
| Demsa | Bali, Bata, Bille, Mbula-Bwazza Wakka |
| Fufore | Fulfulde, Bata, Mumuye |
| Ganye | Fulfulde, Peere, Chamba Daka, Mumuye |
| Girei | Fulfulde, Bata, Tambo |
| Gombi | Bura-Pabir, Ga'anda, Hwana, Lala-Roba, Ngwaba |
| Guyuk | Longuda |
| Hong | Kilba, Marghi |
| Jada | Fulfulde, Mumuye, Chamba, Koma |
| Lamurde | Tsobo,Kwa, Bacama |
| Madagali | Marghi, Mafa, Sukur Language |
| Maiha | Nzanyi |
| Mayo-Belwa | Fulfulde, Mumuye, Wakka |
| Michika | Kamwe |
| Mubi North | Fali |
| Mubi South | Gude, Mafa |
| Numan | Bachama, Waaja, Kaan |
| Shelleng | Kanakuru |
| Song | Mboi, Yungur |
| Toungo | Chamba, Mumuye |
| Yola North | Lakka, Mumuye |
| Yola South | Fulfulde, Mumuye ,Vere |

== Politics ==
The Governor of Adamawa State which acts as the Executive, the State Legislature, and the Adamawa State House of Assembly are located in Yola, the state capital.

=== Electoral system ===
The electoral system of each state is selected using a modified two-round system. To be elected in the first round, a candidate must receive the plurality of the vote and over 25% of the vote in at least two-thirds of the State local government Areas. If no candidate passes the threshold, a second round will be held between the top candidate and the next candidate to have received a plurality of votes in the highest number of local government areas.

== Notable people ==
- Atiku Abubakar (born 26 November 1946) a Nigerian politician and businessman who served as the Vice President of Nigeria from 1999 to 2007.
- Iya Abubakar
- Jibril Aminu
- Alex Badeh
- Mohammed Barkindo
- Mohammed Bello
- Aisha Buhari
- Done P. Dabale
- Aisha Dahiru Binani
- Ahmadu Umaru Fintiri
- Binta Masi Garba
- Boni Haruna
- Bindow Jibrilla
- Muhammadu Gambo Jimeta
- Ahmed Joda
- Aliyu Kama
- Ibrahim Lamorde
- Babachir Lawal
- Aliyu Mai-Bornu
- Tahir Mamman
- Buba Marwa
- Abubakar Saleh Michika
- Boss Mustapha
- Murtala Nyako
- Muhammadu Ribadu
- Nuhu Ribadu
- Bamanga Tukur
- Mahmud Tukur
- Mahmud Modibbo Tukur
- Kwada Joseph Ayuba
