= Margi South language =

Chadic language spoken in Nigeria

Marghi South
- Native to: Nigeria
- Region: Adamawa, Borno, Gombe, Taraba and Yobe State
- Native speakers: 170,000 (2006)
- Language family: Afro-Asiatic: Chadic; Biu–Mandara; Bura–Higi; Bura (A.2); Marghi South

Language codes
- ISO 639-3: mfm
- Glottolog: marg1266

Marghi South is a Chadic language of Nigeria. It is perhaps closer to Huba than it is to Margi.
