= Huba language =

Chadic language spoken in Nigeria

Huba
- Kilba
- Nya Huba
- Native to: Nigeria
- Region: Adamawa State
- Ethnicity: Kilba
- Native speakers: 310,000 (2006 census)
- Language family: Afro-Asiatic: Chadic; Biu–Mandara; Bura–Higi; Bura (A.2); Huba

Language codes
- ISO 639-3: hbb
- Glottolog: huba1236

The Huba language (Nya Huba), also known as Kilba, is a Chadic language of Nigeria.
