= Adamawa Fulfulde =

Variety of the Fula language

- Fulfulde / Adamaawa Fulfulde ڢُلْڢُلْدٜ / عَدَمَاوَ ڢُلْڢُلْدٜ
- Native to: Cameroon, Chad, Nigeria
- Region: Sahel
- Ethnicity: Fula
- Speakers: L1: 3.0 million (2019); L2: 2.7 million (2019)
- Language family: Niger–Congo?: Atlantic–Congo; Senegambian; Fula–Wolof; Fula; Eastern; Adamawa Fulfulde
- Dialects: Bilkiri; Garoua; Maroua; Ngaondéré; Mbororoore
- Writing system: Arabic (Ajami); Latin

Language codes
- ISO 639-3: fub
- Glottolog: adam1253

Adamawa Fulfulde is a variety of the Fula language. It is spoken mainly in Cameroon but also by significant communities residing in Nigeria, Chad, and Sudan by Fulani pastoralists across the Sahel. It is also known as Eastern Fulfulde and by various other names including Boulbe, Dzemay, Fula, Fulfulde, Mbororo, Palata, Peul etc.

Adamawa Fulfulde was originally brought to Cameroon in the early parts of the 19th century during a religious war (Jihad) that was launched by Usman dan Fodio from Northern Nigeria. It was originally used as a trade language, however since the arrival of Christian missionaries in the latter half of the 19th century in 1885 to the area in what is now Northern Cameroon and Northern Nigeria, Adamawa Fulfulde became a language widely used in churches and is now used as a Language Of Wider Communication (LWC) in 3 regions of Cameroon.

It is an Atlantic language that belongs to the Niger–Congo language family. The speakers of the language are the Fulani people. The language itself is divided into a number of sub-dialects: Maroua, Garoua, Ngaondéré, Kambariire, Mbororoore, and Bilkire.

In Sudan, the language is spoken mainly in Blue Nile, Gedaref, and Sennar states with some communities of speakers also found in North Kordofan and South Kordofan states. In South Sudan, it is spoken in Western Bahr el Ghazal state by Ambororo cattle herders. In Chad, it is spoken in Lac Léré Department in the Mayo-Kebbi Ouest Region. In Nigeria, it is spoken in Adamawa and Taraba states. While in Cameroon the language is widespread across the Far North and Northern regions of the country.

Adamawa Fulfulde has the Morphological imperative in which words are divided into second singular and second plural, and like many of the languages of the Fula dialect continuum and Niger–Congo language family, Adamawa Fulfulde has a system of noun classes and marks plurals by mutating the initial consonant of a word. The word order for Adamawa Fulfulde is SOV (subject–object–verb).

== Orthography ==
Adamawa Fulfulde is mostly written in a modified Arabic script, in the tradition of Ajami script, that it shares with many other languages such as Hausa language, and many other languages in Sub-Sahara Africa. Writing Fulfulde with Arabic script has a long tradition and old manuscripts are found in all of West Africa. While traditionally, the Arabic alphabet was used in its unmodified original 28-character state, and thus no distinction was made between similar sounds, such as [b]/[mb]/[ɓ], [d]/[nd], or [p]/[f], today, despite a lack of governmental endorsement in many instances, these letters and writing conventions have been standardized and agreed upon.

Latin alphabet is also used for writing of Adamawa. The usage of Latin is a lot more recent, only coming to existence with the arrival of European Christian. Still, in Cameroon, Arabic alphabet remains more popular for writing of Adamawa Fulfulde than Latin.

=== Adamawa Fulfulde Ajami alphabet ===
The Adamawa Fulfulde Ajami alphabet is the result of many decades of efforts to standardize, starting from the 1960s. By the 1990s, the orthography was well established. In 1998, at the JCMWA/MICCAO conference in Ngaoundéré, Cameroon, over 100 representatives from 14 West African countries agreed that this orthography would be a good standard for writing the Fulfulde language with Arabic script.

The alphabet consists of 33 basic letters, 28 plus hamaza from Arabic, and 4 are new letters created for use in Fulfulde. 10 of the Arabic letters are only used for writing Arabic loanwords, and have no use for writing indigenous Fulfulde words.

Primary Characters of Adamawa Fulfulde Ajami
Name	Forms				Sound represented	Latin equivalent	Unicode	Notes
Name	Isolated	Final	Medial	Initial	Sound represented	Latin equivalent	Unicode	Notes
aliifi اَلِيڢِ	ا	ـا			[aː] ([∅])	A a ( - )	U+0627	Main function of this letter is lengthening of the vowel [a], in which case, the preceding letter needs to carry a diacritic '◌َا'. Unlike the conventions in various other languages using Arabic alphabet, this letter is not used at the beginning of words as a vowel diacritic carrier. Instead, the letter ayni 'عـ ع' is used. This letter does come in the beginning of words as a vowel diacritic carrier for common Arabic loanwords.
bee بٜىٰ	ب	ـب	ـبـ	بـ	[b]	B b	U+0628	
ɓee moɗu ࢡٜىٰ مٛطُ	ࢡ	ـࢡ	ـࢡـ	ࢡـ	[ɓ]	Ɓ ɓ	U+08A1	Character unique to Fulfulde, not found in Arabic.
tee تىٰ	ت	ـت	ـتـ	تـ	[t]	T t	U+062A	
camamlu شَمَمْلُ	ث	ـث	ـثـ	ثـ	[s] ([θ])	S s	U+062B	Only used in Arabic loanwords. Pronounced as [θ] in Arabic, but as [s] in Fulfulde.
jiimi جِيمِ	ج	ـج	ـجـ	جـ	[d͡ʒ]	J j	U+062C	
haa baaluul حَا بَالُولْ	ح	ـح	ـحـ	حـ	[h]	H h	U+062D	This letter is pronounced as [h] in Fulfulde, and is used for representing the sound [h] (except in Arabic loanwords). This is contrary to Arabic itself where this letter is pronounced as [ħ] (voiceless pharyngeal fricative), and the letter haa peetel 'هـ ه' is pronounced as [h]. The latter is only used in Arabic loanwords in Fulfulde.
haa toɓɓuŋgol خَا تٛࢡُّنغْغٛلْ	خ	ـخ	ـخـ	خـ	[h] ([x])	H h (Kh kh)	U+062E	Only used in Arabic loanwords. Pronounced as [x] in Arabic, but as [h] or [x] in Fulfulde.
deeli دٜىٰلِ	د	ـد	-	-	[d]	D d	U+062F	
jaali ذَالِ	ذ	ـذ	-	-	[d͡ʒ] ([z]/[ð])	J j	U+0630	Only used in Arabic loanwords. Pronounced as [ð] in Arabic, but as [d͡ʒ] in Fulfulde, as [z] in Maroua.
arre عَرّٜ	ر	ـر	-	-	[ɾ]/[r]	R r	U+0631	The letter arre 'ر' is pronounced as "flapped" [ɾ] on its own, but when geminated (with shaddah diacritic), as a "thrill" [r]".
jayra زَيْرَ	ز	ـز	-	-	[d͡ʒ] ([z])	J j	U+0632	Only used in Arabic loanwords. Pronounced as [z] in Arabic, but as [d͡ʒ] in Fulfulde, as [z] in Maroua.
siini سِينِ	س	ـس	ـسـ	سـ	[s]	S s	U+0633	
ciini شِينِ	ش	ـش	ـشـ	شـ	[t͡ʃ]~[ʃ]	C c	U+0634	This letter has a variation of pronunciations in different local dialects.
saadi صَادِ	ص	ـص	ـصـ	صـ	[s] ([sˤ])	S s	U+0635	Only used in Arabic loanwords. Pronounced as [sˤ] in Arabic, but as [s] in Fulfulde.
daadi ضَادِ	ض	ـض	ـضـ	ضـ	[d] ([dˤ])	D d	U+0636	Only used in Arabic loanwords. Pronounced as [dˤ] in Arabic, but as [d] in Fulfulde.
ɗaadi طَادِ	ط	ـط	ـطـ	طـ	[ɗ]	Ɗ ɗ	U+0637	
jaadi ظَادِ	ظ	ـظ	ـظـ	ظـ	[d͡ʒ] ([z])	J j	U+0638	Only used in Arabic loanwords. Pronounced as [z] in Arabic, but as [d͡ʒ] in Fulfulde, as [z] in Maroua.
ayni عَيْنِ	ع	ـع	ـعـ	عـ	[∅]/[ʔ]	’	U+0639	This consonant is used at the beginning of words that start with vowels, to be a carrier of the vowel diacritic. It is also used in middle and end of words when there are vowel sequences. This is the local indigenous innovation in the Adamawa dialectical area.
aŋgani عَنغْغَنِ	غ	ـغ	ـغـ	غـ	[g]	G g	U+063A	
fee ڢٜىٰ	ڢ	ـڢ	ـڢـ	ڢـ	[f]	F f	U+063A	
pee ݠٜىٰ	ݠ	ـݠ	ݠـ	ݠـ	[p]	P p	U+0760	Character unique to Fulfulde, not found in Arabic.
gaafu قَاڢُ	ق	ـق	ـقـ	قـ	[k]~[g] ([q])	K k G g	U+0642	Only used in Arabic loanwords. Pronounced as [q] in Arabic, but as [k~g] in Fulfulde.
keefu کٜىٰڢُ	ک	ـک	ـکـ	کـ	[k]	K k	U+06A9	
laamu لَامُ	ل	ـل	ـلـ	لـ	[l]	L l	U+0644	
miimi مِيمِ	م	ـم	ـمـ	مـ	[m]/[ᵐ◌]	M m	U+0645	This letter serves two functions. Either as a consonant [m], in which case it will always carry a diacritic, including zero-vowel/sukun 'مْـ مْ diacritic. Or it is a part of a digraph that indicates a prenasalized consonant, in which case it will not carry any diacritic.
nuunu نُونُ	ن	ـن	ـنـ	نـ	[n]/[ⁿ◌]	N n	U+0646	This letter serves two functions. Either as a consonant [n], in which case it will always carry a diacritic, including zero-vowel/sukun 'نْـ نْ diacritic. Or it is a part of a digraph that indicates a prenasalized consonant, in which case it will not carry any diacritic.
haa peetel هَا ݠٜىٰتٜلْ	ه	ـه	ـهـ	هـ	[h]	H h	U+0647	Only used in Arabic loanwords. For all other instances, the letter haa baaluul 'ح' is used.
waawu وَاوُ	و	ـو	-	-	[w]/[oː]/[uː]	W w Oo oo Uu uu	U+0648	This letter serves two functions, either as a consonant [w], or it lengthens vowels [o] or [u]. When serving as a consonant, it always carries a diacritic, including zero-vowel/sukun 'وْ' diacritic. When lengthening a vowel, it does not. When lengthening a vowel, the preceding letter must carry either an [o] diacritic '◌ٛو' or an [u] diacritic '◌ُو'.
yah يَحْ	ي	ـي	ـيـ	يـ	[j]/[iː]	Y y Ii ii	U+064A	This letter serves two functions, either as a consonant [j], or it lengthens vowel [i]. When serving as a consonant, it always carries a diacritic, including zero-vowel/sukun 'يْ' diacritic. When lengthening a vowel, it does not. When lengthening a vowel, the preceding letter must carry an [i] diacritic '◌ِيـ ◌ِي'.
-	ىٰ	ـىٰ	ـىٰـ	ىٰـ	[eː]	Ee ee	U+0649 plus U+0670	Letter used for lengthening of vowel [e]. The preceding letter must carry an [e] diacritic '◌ٜىٰـ ◌ٜىٰ'.
yah moɗi ࢨَحْ مٛطِ	ࢨ	ـࢨ	ـࢨـ	ࢨـ	[jˤ]	Ƴ ƴ	U+08A8	Character unique to Fulfulde, not found in Arabic.
nya ࢩَ	ࢩ	ـࢩ	ـࢩـ	ࢩـ	[ɲ]	Ny ny	U+08A9	Character unique to Fulfulde, not found in Arabic.
hamaja هَمَزَ	ء	-	-	-	[ʔ]	’	U+0621	Only used in Arabic loanwords to indicate a glottal pause or a vowel sequence. In native Fula words, the letter ayni 'عـ ع' is used.

==== Prenasalized consonants ====
In Adamawa Fulfulde, there are 4 prenasalized consonants. Prenasalized consonants are written as a digraph (combination of two consonants). The first letter of the digraph representing a prenasalized consonant cannot take any diacritic, including zero-vowel diacritic sukun '◌ْ'.

Adamawa Fulfulde prenasalized Consonant Digraphs
Forms				Sound represented	Latin equivalent	Example	
Isolated	Final	Medial	Initial	Sound represented	Latin equivalent	Fulfulde Word	Meaning
مب	ـمب	ـمبـ	مبـ	[ᵐb]	mb	مبَرُغٛ mbarugo ڢٛمبِنَ fombina	to Kill South
نج	ـنج	ـنجـ	نجـ	[ⁿd͡ʒ]	nj	نجَارٜىٰندِ njaareendi مِسَنجَ mi sanja مِوَانجَ mi waanja	sand I change I pour out
ند	ـند	-	-	[ⁿd]	nd	ندِيَمْ ndiyam سٜندُغٛ sendugo حٜندُ hendu جٛوندٜ joonde	water to separate wind place
نغ	ـنغ	ـنغـ	نغـ	[ⁿg]/[ŋ]	ng / ŋ	نغَرٛلْ ŋarol ࢡِنغْغٜلْ ɓiŋgel عٛوَنغْغَ O waŋga نغَيْنَاکَ ngaynaaka يَيْنَنغٛ yaynango	beauty child he shows pasture to shine to

==== Vowels and diacritics ====
Like other languages that have historically been written within what's known as the Ajami tradition, there is a full reliance on diacritics for writing vowels. All vowels are written with diacritics. In Arabic there are only three diacritics, which represent [a] '◌َ', [u] [i] '◌ُ', and [i] '◌ِ'. The general tradition is that when there are vowels that don't exist in Arabic, new diacritics are created. In Adamawa Fulfulde these include the Quranic imāla '◌ٜ' for vowel [e], and a special diacritic '◌ٛ' for vowel [o].

Unlike Arabic orthography, or other Arabic-derived scripts, in Ajami tradition, all diacritics are written. Even letters that don't have any vowels, are written with a zero-vowel/sukun '◌ْ' diacritic. Only in the following instances are letters written without a diacritic:

Vowels are lengthened by combining the diacritic with a follow-up letter, just as is the tradition in Arabic. These follow-up letters are written without a diacritic.
Letters miimi 'مـ' and nuunu 'نـ' can be part of a digraph representing prenasalized consonants. In these instances, these two letters are written without a diacritic.

Vowel at beginning of word
A	E	I	O	U
عَـ / عَ	عٜـ / عٜ	عِـ / عِ	عٛـ / عٛ	عُـ / عُ
Aa	Ee	Ii	Oo	Uu
عَا	عٜىٰـ / عٜىٰ	عِيـ / عِي	عٛو	عُو

Vowel at middle and end of word
a	e	i	o	u	∅
◌َ	◌ٜ	◌ِ	◌ٛ	◌ُ	◌ْ
aa	ee	ii	oo	uu	
◌َا / ـَا	◌ٜىٰـ / ـٜىٰـ ◌ٜىٰ / ـٜىٰ	◌ِيـ / ـِيـ ◌ِي / ـِي	◌ٛو / ـٛو	◌ُو / ـُو	

=== Adamawa Fulfulde Latin alphabet ===
Adamawa Fulfulde Latin alphabet
’	A a	Aa aa	B b	Ɓ ɓ	C c	D d	Ɗ ɗ	E e	Ee ee	F f	G g	H h	I i	Ii ii	J j	K k	Kh kh	L l	M m
[ʔ]	[a]	[aː]	[b]	[ɓ]	[t͡ʃ]‍~[ʃ]‍	[d]	[ɗ]	[e]	[eː]	[f]	[g]	[h]	[i]	[iː]	[d͡ʒ]~[z]‍	[k]	[h]~[x]	[l]	[m]
Mb mb	Nd nd	N n	Ng ng	Nj nj	Ny ny	O o	Oo oo	P p	R r	Rr rr	S s	T t	U u	Uu uu	W w	Y y	Ŋ ŋ	Ƴ ƴ	
[ᵐb]	[ⁿd]	[n]	[ᵑɡ]	[ᶮd͡ʒ]	[ɲ]	[o]	[oː]	[p]	[ɾ]	[r]	[s]	[t]	[u]	[uː]	[w]	[j]	[ŋ]	[jˤ]	

== Sample text ==
Passage from the Bible, Book of Acts, Chapter 9, verses 4 and 5:

Translation	^{4} He fell to the ground and heard a voice say to him, "Saul, Saul, why do you persecute me?" ^{5} "Who are you, Lord?" Saul asked. "I am Jesus, whom you are persecuting," he replied.
Latin script	^{4} O do’’i haa lesdi, o nani sawtu ɗon wi’a mo: "Sol, Sol! Koni toonyontooɗa mi?" ^{5} O ƴami: "An a moy, Jawmiraawo?" Sawtu go jaabi: "Min woni Iisa ni tionyotooɗa.
Ajami script	^{٤} عٛدٛعِّ حَا لٜسْدِ، عٛنَنِ سَوْتُ طٛنْ وِعَ مٛ:‌ «سٛلْ، سٛلْ! کٛنِ تٛوࢩٛتٛوطَ مِ؟» ^{٥} عٛࢨَمِ: «عَنْ عَ مٛيْ، جَوْمُرَاوٛ؟» سَوْتُ غٛ جَابِ:‌ «مِنْ وٛنِ عِيسَى مٛ تٛوࢩٛتٛوطَ؞»
