= 2023 Adamawa State gubernatorial election =

2023 gubernatorial election in Adamawa State, Nigeria

- 18 March 2023
- Registered: 2,196,566
- Turnout: 39.90% (Note: This figure is based on 876,387 (the number of accredited voters); 869,106 voters (39.57%) cast votes (validly or invalidly) while 853,819 voters (38.87%) cast valid votes. Another turnout metric used by INEC is based on Permanent Voter Card-holding voters: either the percent of Permanent Voter Card-holding voters that were accredited to vote (44.47%) or the percent of Permanent Voter Card-holding voters that cast a vote—either validly or invalidly (44.10%); also used is the percent of Permanent Voter Card-holding voters that cast valid votes (43.33%).)
Nominee	Ahmadu Umaru Fintiri	Aishatu Dahiru Ahmed
Party	PDP	APC
Running mate	Kaletapwa Farauta	Titsi Ganama
Popular vote	430,861	398,788
Percentage	50.46%	46.71%
- LGA results Fintiri: 40–50% 50–60% 60–70% 70–80% Ahmed: 50–60% 60–70%
Governor before election
Ahmadu Umaru Fintiri
PDP
Elected Governor
Ahmadu Umaru Fintiri
PDP

The 2023 Adamawa State gubernatorial election took place on 18 March 2023, to elect the Governor of Adamawa State, concurrent with elections to the Adamawa State House of Assembly as well as twenty-seven other gubernatorial elections and elections to all other state houses of assembly. The election — which was postponed from its original 11 March date — was held three weeks after the presidential election and National Assembly elections. Incumbent Governor Ahmadu Umaru Fintiri (PDP) was re-elected by a 3.75% margin over first runner-up and APC nominee — Senator Aishatu Dahiru Ahmed.

The primaries, scheduled for between 4 April and 9 June 2022, resulted in Fintiri winning the Peoples Democratic Party primary unopposed on 26 May while the All Progressives Congress nominated Senator for Adamawa Central Aishatu Dahiru Ahmed on 25 May. Although a Federal High Court ruling nullified the APC primary on 14 October, an Appeal Court judgment overturned the nullification and reinstated Ahmed on 24 November.

The conduct of the general election was highly controversial with INEC failing to declare the results by 20 March due to delays in counting due to logistical problems and attempted electoral interference. Later on 20 March, INEC declared the election inconclusive; Fintiri and the PDP rejected the declaration, having already alleged a plot to rig the election in favour of Ahmed. The commission set the supplementary election on 15 April, along with other supplementary elections nationwide.

As collation was still in progress on the early morning of 16 April, INEC Resident Electoral Commissioner Hudu Ari declared Ahmed as the victor; the declaration led to immediate protest as the Resident Electoral Commissioner does not have the power to declare a winner, collation was incomplete, and Ari refused to give any data on the purported results. In response, the national INEC called Ari's declaration "null, void and of no effect" before summoning him to the INEC headquarters in Abuja and barring him from office. On 17 April, returning officer Mohammed Mele declared the genuine results: in total, Fintiri obtained nearly 431,000 votes and 50% of the vote as runner-up Ahmed received almost 399,000 votes and 47% of the vote. The controversial and prolonged election process drew public outrage with critics calling the process a "new low" and "dance of shame" for INEC amid various other electoral controversies. Journalists noted potential credibility issues Fintiri could face due to the declaration scandal.

== Electoral system ==
The Governor of Adamawa State is elected using a modified two-round system. To be elected in the first round, a candidate must receive the plurality of the vote and over 25% of the vote in at least two-thirds of state local government areas. If no candidate passes this threshold, a second round will be held between the top candidate and the next candidate to have received a plurality of votes in the highest number of local government areas.

== Background ==
Adamawa State is a large northeastern state in the process of recovering from the Boko Haram insurgency. The state also has an underdeveloped agricultural sector and low education rates along with continued security challenges from Boko Haram and ISWAP to sustained conflict between herders and farmers.

Politically, the 2019 Adamawa elections were a swing back to the PDP as its presidential nominee Atiku Abubakar won the state back from Buhari and Fintiri unseated APC Governor Bindo Jibrilla. Legislatively the PDP also gained ground, winning two Senate seats, five House of Representatives seats, and control of the House of Assembly. During Fintiri's term, his administration stated focuses included increased security, ethnic and religious harmony, and water resource management. In terms of his performance, Fintiri was commended for civil service reform while being criticized for having few accomplishments of his own and disregarding FAAN airport health protocols in July 2020.

== Primary elections ==
The primaries, along with any potential challenges to primary results, were to take place between 4 April and 3 June 2022 but the deadline was extended to 9 June. According to some candidates and community leaders, an informal zoning gentlemen's agreement sets the Adamawa Central Senatorial District to have the next governor as since the 1999 return of democracy, all Adamawa governors have come from either the Adamawa South or Adamawa North Senatorial Districts. However, no major party has yet closed their primaries to candidates from the North or South.

=== All Progressives Congress ===
On 20 April 2022, the APC National Executive Committee announced the party's schedule for gubernatorial primaries, setting its expression of interest form price at ₦10 million and nomination form price at ₦40 million with a 50% nomination form discount for candidates younger than 40 while women and candidates with disabilities get free nomination forms. Forms were to be sold from 26 April to 6 May until the deadline was later extended to 10 May then 12 May. After the submission of nomination forms by 13 May, candidates were screened by a party committee on 14 and 15 May while 16 May was the date for the screening appeal process. Ward congresses and LGA congresses were set for between 7 and 9 May to elect delegates for the primary. Candidates approved by the screening process advanced to a primary set for 26 May, in concurrence with other APC gubernatorial primaries; challenges to the result could be made the next day.

On the primary date, the six candidates continued to an indirect primary in Yola that resulted in Aishatu Dahiru Ahmed—Senator for Adamawa Central and former member of the House of Representatives—emerging as the APC nominee after results showed her winning over 42% of the delegates' votes. Controversy arose during the primary when two of Ahmed's campaigners were arrested while caught bribing delegates and after the primary, accusation of overvoting led to internal debates. Later it was noted that Ahmed's nomination was the first time a woman had been nominated by a major party for the Adamawa governorship and only the second time a woman had been nominated by a major party for any state governorship. Post-primary analysis noted several failures from Ahmed's opponents and the success of Ahmed's campaign in picking off delegates expected to vote for others along with consolidating support from women delegates. However, about a month after the primary, first runner-up Nuhu Ribadu sued for the nullification of the primary based on the reports of vote-buying. Despite the court proceedings, Ahmed continued her campaign and picked Titsi Ganama—a fellow former House of Representatives member—as her running mate. On 14 October, Ribadu's suit was ruled on with Judge Abdulaziz Anka siding with Ribadu in invalidating Ahmed's nomination due to overvoting in the primary; however, Anka did not name Ribadu as nominee or order a rerun primary and instead rendered the APC without a nominee for the gubernatorial election. Ahmed announced her intention to appeal the judgment later that week and a Court of Appeal judgment on 24 November ruled in her favour, reinstating Ahmed as nominee. Although Ribadu originally announced his intention to take the case to the Supreme Court, he withdrew the lawsuit in early December "for the larger good of the party."

==== Nominated ====
- Aishatu Dahiru Ahmed: Senator for Adamawa Central (2019–present) and former House of Representatives member for Yola North/Yola South/Girei (2015–2019)
  - Running mate—Titsi Ganama: former House of Representatives member for Madagali/Michika (2011–2015) and former Commissioner of Finance

==== Eliminated ====
- Bindow Jibrilla: former Governor (2015–2019) and former Senator for Adamawa North (2011–2015)
- Umar Mustapha: engineer
- Abdulrazak Namdas: House of Representatives member for Jada/Ganye/Mayo Belwa/Toungo (2015–present)
- Nuhu Ribadu: 2019 APC gubernatorial candidate, 2015 PDP gubernatorial nominee, 2011 ACN presidential nominee, and former Chairman of the Economic and Financial Crimes Commission (2003–2007)
- Warfarninyi Theman: former state APC Secretary

==== Withdrew ====
- Ishaku Elisha Abbo: Senator for Adamawa North (2019–present)

==== Declined ====
- Mahmood Halilu Ahmed: 2019 APC gubernatorial candidate and brother of First Lady Aisha Buhari
- Abubakar Girei: former Senator for Adamawa Central (1999–2003)
- Boss Mustapha: Secretary to the Government of the Federation (2017–present), former Managing Director of the National Inland Waterways Authority (2016–2017), and 1991 SDP gubernatorial nominee
- Abdul-Aziz Nyako: former Senator for Adamawa Central (2015–2019) and 2019 ADC gubernatorial nominee

==== Results ====
Candidates' vote share
1. Aishatu Dahiru Ahmed (44.1%)
2. Nuhu Ribadu (29.5%)
3. Bindow Jibrilla (10.6%)
4. Abdulrazak Namdas (9.64%)
5. Other candidates (6.15%)

APC primary results
Party	Candidate	Votes	%
APC	Aishatu Dahiru Ahmed	430	44.10%
APC	Nuhu Ribadu	288	29.54%
APC	Bindow Jibrilla	103	10.56%
APC	Abdulrazak Namdas	94	9.64%
APC	Umar Mustapha	39	4.00%
APC	Warfarninyi Theman	21	2.15%
Total votes		975	100.00%
Invalid or blank votes		36	N/A
Turnout		1,011	Unknown

=== People's Democratic Party ===
On 16 March 2022, the national PDP announced its gubernatorial primaries' schedule, setting its expression of interest form price at ₦1 million and the nomination form price at ₦20 million with a 50% discount for candidates between 25 and 30. Forms were to be sold until 1 April but the party later extended the deadline four times before reaching a final deadline of 22 April. After the submission of nomination forms by 25 April, candidates were screened by a party committee on 28 April while 2 May was the rescheduled date for the screening appeal process. Ward congresses were set for 29 April and LGA congresses were rescheduled for 10 May to elect delegates for the primary. Candidates approved by the screening process advanced to a primary set for 25 May, in concurrence with all other PDP gubernatorial primaries; challenges to the result could be made in the following days.

Although there was significant controversy over the disqualification of Fintiri's only primary opponent a few days before the contest, the primary held peacefully with Fintiri as the sole candidate. After winning unopposed at the primary venue in Yola, Fintiri thanked the party delegates and urged the state party to support Atiku Abubakar's presidential primary campaign. About a month after the primary, Kaletapwa Farauta—the Vice-Chancellor of Adamawa State University and former Commissioner of Education from Numan—was picked as Fintiri's running mate instead of incumbent Deputy Governor Crowther Seth. At the formal unveiling event of Farauta as running mate in early August, Fintiri said he picked Farauta for a gender balanced ticket and praises Seth's service.

==== Nominated ====
- Ahmadu Umaru Fintiri: Governor (2019–present), former House of Assembly member for Madagali (2007–2015), former acting Governor (2014), and former Speaker of the House of Assembly (2014)
  - Running mate—Kaletapwa Farauta: Vice-Chancellor of Adamawa State University (2017–present) and former Commissioner of Education (2015–2017)

==== Disqualified by screening committee ====
- Jameel Abubakar Waziri: former Aso Rock Presidential Villa chief of Protocol

==== Results ====
PDP primary results
Party	Candidate	Votes	%
PDP	Ahmadu Umaru Fintiri	663	100.00%
Total votes		663	100.00%
Invalid or blank votes		5	N/A
Turnout		668	Unknown

=== Minor parties ===
- Hussaini Tahir (Action Alliance)
  - Running mate: Philip Andrew
- Muhammad Usman Shuwa (Action Democratic Party)
  - Running mate: Hamza Gurumpanwa Balisobso
- Abdulkadir Isa Adam (Action Peoples Party)
  - Running mate: Calvin Yusuf Pelene
- Umaru Babangida (African Democratic Congress)
  - Running mate: Victoria Yohana
- Bello Babajo (Allied Peoples Movement)
  - Running mate: Suleiman Salisu
- Yahaya Cholli (All Progressives Grand Alliance)
  - Running mate: Nasashiya Swade
- Umar Mustapha Madawaki (Labour Party)
  - Running mate: Samson Sunyammen Calvin
- Sa'ad Mohammed Chubado Tahir (New Nigeria Peoples Party)
  - Running mate: Nuhu Yati Luguja
- Maina Aliyu Abba (National Rescue Movement)
  - Running mate: Emmanuel John
- Ibrahim Baba-inna (People's Redemption Party)
  - Running mate: Rebecca Audu
- Umar Ardo (Social Democratic Party)
  - Running mate: Yusuf Amos Sunday
- Amron Dadou (Zenith Labour Party)
  - Running mate: Mohammed Yusuf

== Campaign ==
In the months after the primaries, pundits noted the potential boost that Fintiri could receive due to Adamawa-native Atiku Abubakar's nomination to be the PDP presidential nominee; another issue for Ahmed was due to the APC presidential ticket—APC nominee Bola Tinubu's selection of Kashim Shettima created a Muslim-Muslim ticket, violating an unwritten convention against same religion tickets—with pundits noting the religious diversity of Adamawa and the opposition forming against the APC among northern Christians. There were also issues within the Adamawa APC as Nuhu Ribadu—runner-up in the gubernatorial primary—contested the primary results leading to an internal party crisis that culminated in the removal of state party chair Ibrahim Bilal in September 2022. Nonetheless, observers also noted Ahmed's strong support base among women voters and historic candidacy to become the first elected woman governor. Analysts claimed that Ahmed's popularity with women may have led Fintiri to drop incumbent Deputy Governor Crowther Seth as his running mate for Kaletapwa Farauta in order to achieve a gender balanced ticket. Another major factor was the ability for Fintiri to retain his support in the Numan area and among the Christian minority; both demographics were vital for Fintiri in 2019. By September, pundits were questioning the effects of misogyny against Ahmed and the political clout of respective running mates along with potential of the more prominent minor parties—Labour Party and Social Democratic Party.

However, the next month brought a massive shift to the race as the APC primary was annulled through a Federal High Court ruling that also refused to accede to a new primary, effectively barring the APC from the election. However, a Court of Appeal judgment in late November overturned the previous ruling, reinstating Ahmed as nominee. Despite the successful appeal and Ribadu's acceptance of the ruling, internal rifts created by the legal battle remained as Ahmed supporters feuded with backers of First Lady Aisha Buhari—who had reportedly argued for a Ribadu-led ticket if the Court of Appeal ordered the party to conduct a new primary.

By January 2023, campaigning intensified as litigation concluded and the election neared. Ahmed focused on women voters at rallies while Fintiri received the endorsement of the influential Church of the Brethren in Nigeria. Analysis from SMB Intelligence also noted ethnicity-based voting as a possibility (Ahmed is an ethnic Fulani while Fintiri is ethnically Marghi); however, the piece focused more on the influence of Abubakar on the race. The next month, focus switched to the presidential election on 25 February. In the election, Adamawa State voted for Atiku Abubakar (PDP); Abubakar won the state with 57.1% of the vote, beating Bola Tinubu (APC) at 25.0% and Peter Obi (LP) at 14.5%. Although the result was unsurprising as Adamawa is in Abubakar's home state and projections had favored him, the totals led to increased attention on Fintiri's chances in the gubernatorial race with the EiE-SBM forecast projecting Fintiri to win based on "the outcome of the presidential elections" while a Premium Times article noted the potential effect of ethnic dynamics. However, reporting from the Daily Post noted that Ahmed had been underestimated in previous elections and could receive a boost from Tinubu's vote in the presidential election. Observers also reiterated the significance of Ahmed's historic candidacy for women in the wake of the federal elections' backslide in female representation, especially considering allegations that the PDP had worked with misogynistic clerics in an attempt to discredit the possibility of a woman becoming governor.

== Projections ==
Source	Projection	As of
Africa Elects (Note: AfricaElects projections predict the likelihood of a candidate winning a state by categorizing a state as "Safe" for exceedingly likely, "Likely" for somewhat likely, and "Lean" for least likely. If no clear determination could be made, states are categorized as "tossups".)	Lean Fintiri	17 March 2023
Enough is Enough- SBM Intelligence (Note: EiE-SBM projections predict which candidates will win states.)	Fintiri	2 March 2023

== Conduct ==
=== Electoral timetable ===
On 26 February 2022, the Independent National Electoral Commission released the timetable, setting out key dates and deadlines for the election. Months later on 27 May 2022, INEC made a slight revision to the timetable, allowing parties extra time to conduct primaries.

- 28 February 2022 – Publication of Notice of Election
- 4 April 2022 – First day for the conduct of party primaries
- 9 June 2022 (Note: The original deadline was 3 June; however, INEC pushed it back to 9 June at the behest of parties.) – Final day for the conduct of party primaries, including the resolution of disputes arising from them
- 1 July 2022 – First day for submission of nomination forms to INEC via the online portal
- 15 July 2022 – Final day for submission of nomination forms to INEC via the online portal
- 12 October 2022 – Commencement of the official campaign period
- 16 March 2023 (Note: The original deadline was 9 March; however, INEC pushed it back to 16 March.) – Final day of the official campaign period

== General election ==
=== Results ===
2023 Adamawa State gubernatorial election
Party	Candidate	Votes	%
AA	Hussaini Tahir		
ADP	Muhammad Usman Shuwa		
APP	Abdulkadir Isa Adam		
ADC	Umaru Babangida		
APM	Bello Babajo		
APC	Aishatu Dahiru Ahmed		
APGA	Yahaya Cholli		
LP	Umar Mustapha Madawaki		
New Nigeria Peoples Party	Sa'ad Mohammed Chubado Tahir		
NRM	Maina Aliyu Abba		
PDP	Ahmadu Umaru Fintiri		
PRP	Ibrahim Baba-inna		
SDP	Umar Ardo		
ZLP	Amron Dadou		
Total votes			100.0%
Turnout			

==== By senatorial district ====
The results of the election by senatorial district.

Senatorial District	Aishatu Dahiru Ahmed APC		Ahmadu Umaru Fintiri PDP		Others		Total Valid Votes
Senatorial District	Votes	Percentage	Votes	Percentage	Votes	Percentage	Total Valid Votes
Adamawa Central Senatorial District (Note: Comprising the local government areas of Fufore, Girei, Gombi, Hong, Song, Yola North, and Yola South.)	TBD	%	TBD	%	TBD	%	TBD
Adamawa North Senatorial District (Note: Comprising the local government areas of Madagali, Maiha, Michika, Mubi North, and Mubi South.)	TBD	%	TBD	%	TBD	%	TBD
Adamawa South Senatorial District (Note: Comprising the local government areas of Demsa, Ganye, Guyuk, Jada, Lamurde, Mayo-Belwa, Numan, Shelleng, and Toungo.)	TBD	%	TBD	%	TBD	%	TBD
Totals	TBD	TBD%	TBD	TBD%	TBD	TBD%	TBD

==== By federal constituency ====
The results of the election by federal constituency.

Federal Constituency	Aishatu Dahiru Ahmed APC		Ahmadu Umaru Fintiri PDP		Others		Total Valid Votes
Federal Constituency	Votes	Percentage	Votes	Percentage	Votes	Percentage	Total Valid Votes
Demsa/Numan/Lamurde Federal Constituency (Note: Comprising the local government areas of Demsa, Numan, and Lamurde.)	TBD	%	TBD	%	TBD	%	TBD
Fufore/Song Federal Constituency (Note: Comprising the local government areas of Fufore and Song.)	TBD	%	TBD	%	TBD	%	TBD
Gombi/Hong Federal Constituency (Note: Comprising the local government areas of Gombi and Hong.)	TBD	%	TBD	%	TBD	%	TBD
Guyuk/Shelleng Federal Constituency (Note: Comprising the local government areas of Guyuk and Shelleng.)	TBD	%	TBD	%	TBD	%	TBD
Madagali/Michika Federal Constituency (Note: Comprising the local government areas of Madagali and Michika.)	TBD	%	TBD	%	TBD	%	TBD
Maiha/Mubi North/Mubi South Federal Constituency (Note: Comprising the local government areas of Maiha, Mubi North, and Mubi South.)	TBD	%	TBD	%	TBD	%	TBD
Mayo Belwa/Ganye/Toungo/Jada Federal Constituency (Note: Comprising the local government areas of Mayo-Belwa, Ganye, Toungo, and Jada.)	TBD	%	TBD	%	TBD	%	TBD
Yola North/Yola South/Girei Federal Constituency (Note: Comprising the local government areas of Yola North, Yola South, and Girei.)	TBD	%	TBD	%	TBD	%	TBD
Totals	TBD	%	TBD	%	TBD	%	TBD

==== By local government area ====
The results of the election by local government area.

LGA	Aishatu Dahiru Ahmed APC		Ahmadu Umaru Fintiri PDP		Others		Total Valid Votes	Turnout Percentage
LGA	Votes	Percentage	Votes	Percentage	Votes	Percentage	Total Valid Votes	Turnout Percentage
Demsa	TBD	%	TBD	%	TBD	%	TBD	%
Fufore	TBD	%	TBD	%	TBD	%	TBD	%
Ganye	TBD	%	TBD	%	TBD	%	TBD	%
Girei	TBD	%	TBD	%	TBD	%	TBD	%
Gombi	TBD	%	TBD	%	TBD	%	TBD	%
Guyuk	TBD	%	TBD	%	TBD	%	TBD	%
Jada	TBD	%	TBD	%	TBD	%	TBD	%
Lamurde	TBD	%	TBD	%	TBD	%	TBD	%
Madagali	TBD	%	TBD	%	TBD	%	TBD	%
Maiha	TBD	%	TBD	%	TBD	%	TBD	%
Michika	TBD	%	TBD	%	TBD	%	TBD	%
Mubi North	TBD	%	TBD	%	TBD	%	TBD	%
Mubi South	TBD	%	TBD	%	TBD	%	TBD	%
Numan	TBD	%	TBD	%	TBD	%	TBD	%
Shelleng	TBD	%	TBD	%	TBD	%	TBD	%
Song	TBD	%	TBD	%	TBD	%	TBD	%
Toungo	TBD	%	TBD	%	TBD	%	TBD	%
Yola North	TBD	%	TBD	%	TBD	%	TBD	%
Yola South	TBD	%	TBD	%	TBD	%	TBD	%
Totals	TBD	%	TBD	%	TBD	%	TBD	%

== See also ==
- 2023 Nigerian elections
- 2023 Nigerian gubernatorial elections
