= 2023 Adamawa State House of Assembly election =

Nigerian elections

- 11 March 2023

All 25 seats in the Adamawa State House of Assembly 13 seats needed for a majority
	Majority party	Minority party	Third party
Party	PDP	APC	New Nigeria Peoples Party
Last election	13	11	0
Seats before	14	10 (Note: The position of MHA Joseph Ayuba Kwada (APC-Michika) is unclear due to his removal from the Assembly after his defection to the APC in April 2022. However, after the removal vote, a court prevented a by-election call as litigation would determine the legality of the removal.)	1
Speaker before election
Abbas Aminu Iya
PDP
Elected Speaker
Wesley Bathiya
PDP

The 2023 Adamawa State House of Assembly election was take place on 18 March 2023, to elect members of the Adamawa State House of Assembly. The election was held concurrent with the state gubernatorial election as well as twenty-seven other gubernatorial elections and elections to all other state houses of assembly. It was held two weeks after the presidential election and National Assembly elections.

== Electoral system ==
The members of state Houses of Assembly are elected using first-past-the-post voting in single-member constituencies.

== Background ==
In the previous House of Assembly elections, the PDP gained a slight majority that elected Aminu Iya Abbas (PDP-Uba/Gaya) as Speaker. In other Adamawa elections, incumbent Governor Bindow Jibrilla (APC) was unseated by Ahmadu Umaru Fintiri (PDP) in the gubernatorial election; legislatively the PDP also gained ground, winning two Senate seats and five House of Representatives seats while the PDP presidential nominee, Adamawa-native Atiku Abubakar, won the state back from Buhari.

Key events included the attempted removal of MHA Joseph Ayuba Kwada (Michika) for defecting from the PDP to the APC despite two members—Shuaibu Musa (Mubi North) and Musa Umar Bororo (Mubi South)—having previously defected from the APC to PDP without repercussion along with a controversial bill that created 22 new districts.

== Overview ==
Affiliation	Party				Total
Affiliation	PDP	APC	ADC	NNPP	Total
Previous Election	13	11	1	0	25
Before Election	14	10	0	1	25
After Election	TBD	TBD	TBD	TBD	25

== Summary ==
Constituency	Incumbent		Results	
Constituency	Incumbent	Party	Status	Candidates
Demsa	Kate Raymond Mamuno	PDP	Incumbent renominated	▌Lumsambani Mijah Dilli (APC); ▌Kate Raymond Mamuno (PDP)
Furore/Gurin (Furore I)	Shuaibu Babas	PDP (Note: This Assembly member was elected as a member of the APC but switched to the PDP during their term.)	Status unknown	▌Umar Bobbo Ismaila (APC); ▌Saidu Yahya Nuhu (PDP)
Ganye	Alhassan Hammanjoda	APC	Incumbent retiring	▌Abdulmalik Jauro Musa (APC); ▌Emmanuel Stephen (PDP)
Girei	Muhammad Mutawalli	APC	Incumbent renominated	▌Muhammad Mutawalli (APC); ▌Abubakar Abdullahi Bakari (PDP)
Gombi	Japhet Kefas	PDP	Incumbent renominated	▌Umar Rufai (APC); ▌Japhet Kefas (PDP)
Guyuk	Adwawa Donglock	PDP	Incumbent renominated	▌Sunday Peter (APC); ▌Adwawa Donglock (PDP)
Hong (Hong II)	Wesley Bathiya	PDP	Incumbent renominated	▌Yohannah Audu (APC); ▌Wesley Bathiya (PDP)
Jada/Mbulo (Jada II)	Hammantukur Yettusuri	NNPP (Note: This Assembly member was elected as a member of the PDP but switched to the NNPP during their term.)	Incumbent retired	▌Usman Bashir (APC); ▌Mohammed Buba Jijiwa (PDP)
Lamurde	Myandasa Bauna	PDP	Incumbent renominated	▌Bedan Menayi (APC); ▌Myandasa Bauna (PDP)
Leko/Koma (Jada I)	Abdullahi Ahmadu	APC	Incumbent renominated	▌Abdullahi Ahmadu (APC); ▌Bulus Geoffrey (PDP)
Madagali	Haruna Jilantikiri	PDP	Incumbent renominated	▌Wakil Thomas Medugu (APC); ▌Haruna Jilantikiri (PDP)
Maiha	Isa Yahaya	APC	Incumbent renominated	▌Isa Yahaya (APC); ▌Ahmed Jingi Belel (PDP)
Mayo-Belwa (Mayo-Belwa II)	Ibrahim Musa	APC (Note: This Assembly member was elected as a member of the ADC but switched to the APC during their term.)	Incumbent renominated	▌Ibrahim Musa (APC); ▌Musa Mahmud Kallamu (PDP)
Michika	Joseph Ayuba Kwada	APC (Note: This Assembly member was elected as a member of the PDP but switched to the APC during their term.)	Incumbent retiring	▌Luka Danbaba (APC); ▌Moses Yerima (PDP)
Mubi North	Shuaibu Musa	PDP	Status unknown	▌Samuel Poul (APC); ▌Ishaka Yusuf (PDP)
Mubi South	Musa Umar Bororo	PDP	Incumbent nominated	▌Yohanna Sahabo Jauro (APC); ▌Musa Umar Bororo (PDP)
Nasarawo/Binyeri (Mayo-Belwa I)	Umar Nashon Gubi	PDP	Incumbent renominated	▌Babangida Mohammed Njidda (APC); ▌Umar Nashon Gubi (PDP)
Numan	Pwamakeno Mackondo	PDP	Incumbent renominated	▌Sodom Tayedi Daniel (APC); ▌Pwamakeno Mackondo (PDP)
Shelleng	Abubakar Isa	APC	Incumbent renominated	▌Abubakar Isa (APC); ▌Kantomon Napthali Bulus (PDP)
Song	Simon Isa	PDP	Incumbent retiring	▌Safiyanu Aliyu Aminu (APC); ▌Emmanuel Kefas (PDP)
Toungo	Abdullahi Umar Nyako	APC	Incumbent renominated	▌Abdullahi Umar Nyako (APC); ▌Kefas Calvin (PDP)
Uba/Gaya (Hong I)	Aminu Iya Abbas	PDP	Incumbent retiring	▌Bello Maigari Mustapha (APC); ▌Hyellapaburi John Adum (PDP)
Verre (Fufore II)	Abdullahi Umar Yapak	APC	Incumbent renominated	▌Abdullahi Umar Yapak (APC); ▌Japheth Hammajabu (PDP)
Yola North	Hamidu Sajo Lekki	PDP	Incumbent renominated	▌Sulaiman Umar Alkali (APC); ▌Hamidu Sajo (PDP)
Yola South	Kabiru Mijinyawa	APC	Incumbent renominated	▌Kabiru Mijinyawa (APC); ▌Baba Adamu Mustapha (PDP)

== See also ==
- 2023 Nigerian elections
- 2023 Nigerian House of Assembly elections
