= Sadiq Ibrahim =

Nigerian politician and lawyer (born 1964)

Sadiq Ibrahim Dasin

Member of the House of Representatives of Nigeria
- In office 2015–2019
- Preceded by: Aminu Hamman-Tukur Ribadu
- Succeeded by: Mustafa Muhammed Saidu
- Constituency: Fufore/Song

Speaker of the Adamawa State House of Assembly
- In office 9 June 2011 – 5 Dec 2011
- Deputy: Wale Fwa
- Preceded by: James Shuaibu Barka
- Succeeded by: Ahmadu Fintiri

Member of the Adamawa State House of Assembly
- In office 2007–2015
- Succeeded by: Shuaibu Babas
- Constituency: Fufore/Gurin

Personal details
- Born: 1964 (age 62) Dasin, Adamawa Province, Nigeria (in present-day Fufore, Adamawa State)
- Party: African Democratic Congress (since 2025)
- Other political affiliations: All Progressives Congress (2015–2025); Peoples Democratic Party (2007–2015)
- Education: Aliyu Musdafa College; University of Maiduguri; Nigerian Law School; Ahmadu Bello University
- Occupation: politician, lawyer, columnist

Sadiq Ibrahim Dasin (born 1964) is a Nigerian politician and lawyer. He served as Speaker of the Adamawa State House of Assembly from 2011 until his impeachment later that year and represented the Fufore/Song constituency in the House of Representatives from 2015 to 2019. He is currently a member of the African Democratic Congress.

== Early life and education ==
Sadiq Ibrahim Dasin was born in Dasin (in present-day Fufore, Adamawa State) in 1964. He attended Dasin Primary School and later completed his secondary education at Aliyu Musdafa College, Yola (later Yelwa Government Secondary School) in 1976.

In 1986, Dasin graduated with a Bachelor's degree in Law from the University of Maiduguri. He was called to the bar in 1987 after attending the Nigerian Law School. In 2011, he obtained a Master's degree in Law (LL.M) with focus on Constitutional and Business Law from the Ahmadu Bello University, Zaria.

== Career ==
After obtaining his Law degree, Dasin worked as a counsel at Habib Bank in Lagos from 1990 to 2001. He was also a Personal Assistant to Adamu Bello, who was at the time serving as Federal Minister of Agriculture.

=== Adamawa State House of Assembly (2011–2015) ===
Dasin began his political career during the 2007 Adamawa State House of Assembly elections, when he was elected to represent Fufore/Gurin under the Peoples Democratic Party (PDP). His "political mentor" during this period was Bello Mohammed Tukur, who was Chief of Staff to the Adamawa's governor Murtala Nyako. In 2009, Dasin was suspended for three months from the State Assembly for not supporting an impeachment move against Governor Nyako.

Dasin was reelected in 2011 and was elected Speaker of the State Assembly. His party the PDP held an overwhelming majority, controlling 20 of the 25 seats. His deputy was Wale Fwa, the representative for Demsa, making her the first woman to hold the office of Deputy Speaker in the state assembly.

In 2011, Dasin called for a review of the Child's Rights Act after a visit to the House by Federal Minister of Women Affairs and Social Development Zainab Maina. The Act was passed into law in 2003 by the Federal Government as an effort to domesticate the UN Convention on the Rights of the Child. Although federally enacted, states are also expected to pass the law as well. As Speaker, Dasin acknowledged that members of the House agreed the Act contained good parts such as the issue of Almajirai and protection of the children against female genital mutilation. However, he argued that some sections conflicted with religious beliefs, particularly provisions criminalising fathers who marry off their daughters below the age of 18. He appealed to the federal ministry to foreword the Child Rights Act to the Christian Association of Nigeria and Muslim scholars, so that provisions perceived to contravene religious principles could be addressed. The Act was eventually signed into law by the Adamawa State government in 2022, joining 33 other states.

On 5 December 2011, five months into his speakership, Dasin was impeached for alleged incompetence. The motion was moved by the member representing Gombi, Jerry Kumdisi, of the opposition Action Congress of Nigeria. This came six weeks ahead of the planned gubernatorial elections, in which Governor Nyako was seeking reelection. Many members of the assembly saw Dasin as a staunch Nyako loyalist who had turned the state's legislative arm into merely a "rubber stamp" for the executive. Shortly after he was elected as the new speaker, Ahmadu Fintiri told reporters that Dasin "had failed to carry everyone along," adding that this was "why legislators saw the need to effect a change in the leadership of the House."

Dasin later took his case to court alleging that he was improperly impeached though more than two thirds of the house members voted for his removal. Following his impeachment, the legislative complex was overrun by armed thugs who called for Dasin's reinstatement as speaker. The Assembly complex remained blocked for 53 consecutive legislative days. It was reopened on January 26 by Fintiri, who had become Acting Governor after the Supreme Court sacked Nyako and four other state governors. Following fresh elections in February, Nyako was reelected as governor.

In late 2012, water released from the Lagdo dam in Cameroon flooded parts of Adamawa, which caused 15 deaths and thousands of displaced persons. Dasin served on a State Assembly committee established to address the needs of communities affected by the flooding. He noted that his constituency was among the worst hit by the flooding, stating that since the dam's construction in 1982, "the destruction of lives and farm land from water being release from this dam has been a recurring phenomenon."

=== Federal House of Representatives (2015–2019) ===
Following the 2015 elections, Dasin was elected to the Federal House of Representatives, representing the Fufore/Song constituency under the All Progressives Congress (APC).

In late 2015, he sponsored a bill seeking the construction of a buffer dam in Adamawa State to mitigate against flooding from Lagdo Dam in Cameroon.

In 2016, Dasin sponsored a bill titled National Grazing Reserve Establishment Bill, 2016. The bill proposed the establishment of a National Grazing Reserves Commission which would be responsible for addressing the country's herdsmen crisis through the control and management of grazing routes and reserves, and would have the authority to establish at least one cattle reserve in each state of the federation.

Following the 2019 general elections, Dasin lost his reelection bid to the PDP candidate Mustafa Muhammad Saidu.

=== Later career ===
In 2019, Speaker of the House of Representatives Femi Gbajabiamila appointed Dasin as his special assistant on political matters in the North East.

In 2025, Dasin defected from the APC to the African Democratic Congress (ADC). He was later appointed interim chairman of its Adamawa State chapter, but was soon replaced with Shehu Yohanna in December. Dasin was then appointed chairman of the ADC's steering committee in Adamawa.
