= 2019 Adamawa State gubernatorial election =

2019 gubernatorial election in Adamawa State, Nigeria

- 9 March 2019
Nominee	Ahmadu Umaru Fintiri	Bindo Jibrilla
Party	PDP	APC
Running mate	Crowther Seth	Martins Babale
Popular vote	376,552	336,386
Governor before election
Bindo Jibrilla
APC
Elected Governor
Ahmadu Umaru Fintiri
PDP

The 2019 Adamawa State gubernatorial election occurred in Nigeria on March 9, 2019. PDP candidate Ahmadu Umaru Fintiri won the election, defeating Bindo Jibrilla of the APC.

Ahmadu Umaru Fintiri emerged PDP gubernatorial candidate after scoring 1,656 votes and defeating his closest rival, Mohammed Jameel who received 465 votes. He picked Martins Babale as his running mate. Bindo Jibrilla was the APC candidate with Crowther Seth as his running mate. 29 candidates contested in the election.

== Electoral system ==
The Governor of Adamawa State is elected using the plurality voting system.

== Primary election ==
=== PDP primary ===
The PDP primary election was held on September 30, 2018. Ahmadu Umaru Fintiri won the primary election polling 1,656 votes against 4 other candidates. His closest rival was Mohammed Jameel, who came second with 465 votes, Bala Ngilari scored 78 votes, Aliyu Umar scored 8 votes, while Garba Dankani had 1 vote.

=== APC primary ===
The APC primary election was held on October 4, 2018. Bindo Jibrilla won the primary election polling 193,656 votes against 2 other candidates. His closest rival was Halilu Ahmed who came second with 15,738 votes, while Malam Nuhu Ribadu came third with 8,364 votes.

== Results ==
A total number of 29 candidates registered with the Independent National Electoral Commission to contest in the election.

The total number of registered voters in the state was 1,973,083, while 905,346 voters were accredited. Total number of votes cast was 899,097, while number of valid votes was 871,307. Rejected votes were 27,790.

Candidate	Party	Votes	%
Ahmadu Umaru Fintiri	People's Democratic Party	376,552	43.22
Bindo Jibrilla	All Progressives Congress	336,386	38.61
Other candidates		158,369	18.18
Total		871,307	100.00
Valid votes		871,307	96.91
Invalid/blank votes		27,790	3.09
Total votes		899,097	100.00
Registered voters/turnout		1,973,083	45.57
Source: ThisDayLive

=== By local government area ===
Here are the results of the election by local government area for the two major parties. The total valid votes of 871,307 represents the 29 political parties that participated in the election. Green represents LGAs won by Ahmadu Umaru Fintiri. Blue represents LGAs won by Bindo Jibrilla.

LGA	Ahmadu Umaru Fintiri PDP		Bindo Jibrilla APC		Total votes
LGA	#	%	#	%	#
Girei	6,938		15,171		
Yola South	18,257		22,129		
Song	25,151		17,845		
Lamurde	20,138		10,182		
Fufore	17,529		21,972		
Hong	26,556		21,407		
Shelleng	11,377		15,944		
Ganye	17,993		19,151		
Guyuk	19,022		12,504		
Toungo	6,018		6,564		
Michika	25,617		13,511		
Madagali	17,660		9,365		
Numan	21,922		11,642		
Mubi North	17,567		31,805		
Mayo Belwa	19,897		14,198		
Yola North	24,383		20,979		
Mubi South	10,420		19,825		
Maiha	8,745		14,939		
Jada	20,076		18,006		
Demsa	22,037		10,342		
Gombi	12,968		9,347		
Totals	376,552		336,386		871,307
