= Deputy governor of Adamawa State =

Second highest-ranking official in the executive branch of Adamawa State in Nigeria

Deputy Governor of Adamawa State
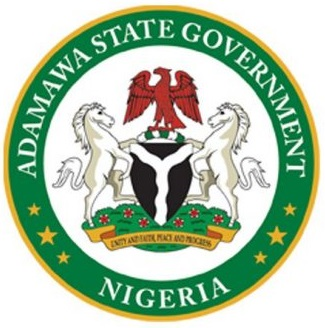
- Seal of Adamawa State

- Flag of Adamawa State
- Incumbent; Kaletapwa Farauta since 29 May 2023
- Executive Branch of the Adamawa State Government
- Style: Deputy Governor (informal); Her Excellency (courtesy)
- Status: Second highest executive branch officer
- Member of: Adamawa State Executive Branch; Adamawa State Cabinet
- Seat: Yola
- Nominator: Gubernatorial candidate
- Appointer: Direct popular election or, if vacant, Governor via House of Assembly confirmation
- Term length: Four years renewable once
- Constituting instrument: Constitution of Nigeria
- Inaugural holder: Bello Tukur (Fourth Republic)
- Succession: First
- Website: adamawastate.gov.ng

The deputy governor of Adamawa State is the second-highest officer in the executive branch of the government of Adamawa State, Nigeria, after the governor of Adamawa State, and ranks first in line of succession. The deputy governor is directly elected together with the governor to a four-year term of office.

Kaletapwa Farauta is the current deputy governor, having assumed office on 29 May 2023. She is the first female occupant of the office.

== Responsibilities ==
The deputy governor assists the governor in exercising primary assignments and is also eligible to replace a dead, impeached, absent or ill Governor as required by the 1999 Constitution of Nigeria.

== List of deputy governors ==
Name	Took office	Left office	Time in office	Party	Elected	Governor
Bello Tukur (born 1960)	29 May 1999	29 May 2007	8 years	Peoples Democratic Party	1999; 2003	Boni Haruna
Bala James Ngilari (born 1972)	29 May 2007	26 February 2008	273 days	Peoples Democratic Party	2007	Murtala Nyako
Bala James Ngilari (born 1972)	29 April 2008	15 July 2014	6 years, 77 days	Peoples Democratic Party	2008; 2012	Murtala Nyako
	8 October 2014	29 May 2015	233 days	Peoples Democratic Party		Bala James Ngilari
Martins Babale (born 1959)	29 May 2015	29 May 2019	4 years	All Progressives Congress	2015	Bindow Jibrilla
Crowther Seth (born 1954)	29 May 2019	29 May 2023	4 years	Peoples Democratic Party	2019	Umaru Fintiri
Kaletapwa Farauta (born 1965)	29 May 2023	Incumbent	3 years, 101 days	Peoples Democratic Party	2023	Umaru Fintiri

== See also ==
- List of governors of Adamawa State
