= 2012 Adamawa State gubernatorial election =

2012 gubernatorial election in Adamawa State, Nigeria

- February 4, 2012
Nominee	Murtala Nyako	Markus Gundiri
Party	PDP	ACN
Running mate	Bala James Ngilari	Abdulrazak Namdas
Popular vote	302,953	241,023
Governor before election
Murtala Nyako
PDP
Elected Governor
Murtala Nyako
PDP

The 2012 Adamawa State gubernatorial election occurred in Nigeria on February 4, 2012. The PDP nominee Murtala Nyako won the election, defeating Markus Gundiri of the ACN.

Murtala Nyako emerged as PDP candidate. He picked Bala James Ngilari as his running mate. Markus Gundiri was the ACN candidate with Abdulrazak Namdas as his running mate.

== Electoral system ==
The Governor of Adamawa State is elected using the plurality voting system.

== Primary election ==
=== PDP primary ===
The PDP primary election was held on October 24, 2011. Murtala Nyako emerged PDP flag bearer after polling 854 votes and defeating his closest rival, Umar Ardo who withdrew from the race. He picked Bala James Ngilari as his running mate.

=== ACN primary ===
The ACN primary election was held in 2011. Markus Gundiri emerged the party's flag bearer and picked Abdulrazak Namdas as his running mate.

== Results ==
Candidate	Party	Votes	%
Murtala Nyako	People's Democratic Party	302,953	55.69
Markus Gundiri	Action Congress of Nigeria	241,023	44.31
Total		543,976	100.00
Source: Channels TV

=== By local government area ===
Here are the results of the election by local government area for the two major parties. Green represents LGAs won by Murtala Nyako. Blue represents LGAs won by Markus Gundiri.

LGA	Murtala Nyako PDP		Markus Gundiri ACN		Total votes
LGA	#	%	#	%	#
Girei	12,920		7,962		
Yola South	20,841		9,083		
Song	15,342		15,160		
Lamurde	8,236		12,374		
Fufore	23,107		7,963		
Hong	11,562		22,747		
Shelleng	10,370		6,742		
Ganye	11,481		12,227		
Guyuk	9,860		15,021		
Toungo	5,000		3,829		
Michika	10,477		13,655		
Madagali	16,139		8,559		
Numan	10,404		14,037		
Mubi North	17,132		14,340		
Mayo Belwa	26,134		14,124		
Yola North	23,133		12,103		
Mubi South	10,035		5,535		
Maiha	19,624		4,688		
Jada	16,893		14,650		
Demsa	14,193		13,765		
Gombi	10,080		12,449		
Totals	302,953		241,023		
