= Kamwe people =

Language group in Nigeria

Kamwe cultural dancers

The Kamwe people (also spelt Kamue) are a Chadic languages-speaking group, native to Adamawa State and Borno State of Nigeria and North Western Cameroon. The Kamwe language is called Vecemwe in the native tongue. Kamwe is a compound word formed of "Ka" and "Mwe", meaning people of the same consanguinity and affinity (matrilineal brotherhood).

== Distribution ==
About 80% of the Kamwe people in Nigeria autochthonous to Michika LGA. They are also found in Mubi North, Hong, Gombi, Song and Madagali. Kamwe people are also found in Borno State, especially in Askira/Uba and Gwoza. Blench (2019) lists Mukta of Mukta village in Adamawa State as part of the Kamwe cluster.

Kamwe is a compound word derived from the words "Ka" and "Mwe", which means "people of". It derived its meaning from a special type of Kamwe ornament worn by close relatives of a deceased person as a mark of identity and empathy. (Note: Ahmadu Bashir 105 year d. 18th December 2018)

According to Kamwe elders, "Mwe" is the mark of true identity of relatives in Kamweland. In the past, if a non-relative wore the Mwe, it could lead to conflict. Only close relatives are allowed to wear the Mwe, because it cements the bond between relatives. Those wearing the Mwe will hug one another saying tselie ra na (you are my relative). The Kamwe are so passionate about the name as they will say "Wesa Kamwe Ra" to compliment each other. Some elders state that Kamwe means people of the heavens, people on the hills, mountains and even the sky. More than 24 dialects of Kamwe language exist, but Nkafa is the central dialect and is used in writing and literature.

The Kamwe people and language were once called Higi(Higgi). Kamwe elders say Higgi is an offensive and derogatory word coined from hagyi (grasshopper) by their neighbours the Margi to mock the Kamwe because of the Kamwe women's appetite for grasshopper. Kamwe people despise the word, except some few in the Dakwa (Bazza) area who are originally of Margi origin. The Margi first called the Kamwe people "Higgi" in 1937.

Kamwe people are autochthonous of Michika local government. Kwada Kwakaa who was a prince and a great lion and leopard hunter is regarded as the founder of the settlement. The settlement was named after his method of hunting animals on the hill. In the Kamwe language, "Mwe" means heaven or hills while "Ci-ka" means creep, which was later mispronounced by colonialists as Michika.

The traditional ruler is called Mbege Kamwe. The current ruler is Ngida Zakawa Kwache. In February 2025, the Adamawa State restored the Kamwe Kingdom which suspended in 1909 and is now called Mbege Ka Mwecika. The new Mbege is Professor Bulus Luka Gadiga.
