= Yusuf Buba Yakub =

Nigerian politician and farmer (born 1968)

The Honourable Yusuf Buba Yakub

Director General, Nigerian Technical Aid Corps (also known as Directorate of Technical Aid Corps),Ministry of Foreign Affairs(Nigeria)
- Incumbent
- Assumed office 22 August 2023
- President: Bola Tinubu
- Preceded by: Pius Olakunle Osunyikanmi

9th Assembly, House of Representatives (Nigeria) Chairman, House Committee on Foreign Affairs
- In office 11 June 2019 – 11 June 2023
- Preceded by: Nnenna Elendu Ukeje
- Succeeded by: Jibrin Abdulmumuni

Member, House of Representatives (Nigeria), Representing Gombi/Hong Federal Constituency, Adamawa State.
- In office 9 June 2015 – 11 June 2023
- Preceded by: Haske Hananiya Francis
- Succeeded by: James Shaibu Barka

Chairman, House Committee of Nigeria-China Relations
- In office 2016–2019
- Succeeded by: Jaafaru Yakubu, 2023

Chairman, House Committee on Nigeria-China Relations & House Committee on Foreign Affairs House of Representatives of Nigeria from Adamawa
- In office 9 June 2015 – 11 June 2023
- Constituency: Gombi/Hong

Personal details
- Born: 13 August 1968 (age 58) Kaduna State, Nigeria
- Party: All Progressive Congress (2013–present)
- Other political affiliations: Social Democratic Party (1992 - 1993); People's Democratic Party (1999)
- Spouse: Nancy Buba
- Education: Army Children's School, New Cantoment 'A' Kaduna; Abubakar Tafawa Balewa University; University of Abuja
- Occupation: Politician; Farmer

Yusuf Buba Yakub (born 13 August 1968) is a Nigerian politician and the current Director General of the Nigerian Technical Aid Corps since 2023. He was previously a member of the House of Representatives (Nigeria) representing the Gombi/Hong Federal Constituency of Adamawa State from 2015 to 2023.

== Early life and education ==
Yakub hails from Garaha in Hong Local Government Area, Adamawa State, Nigeria. He was born in Kaduna, Kaduna State, and attended Army Children's School in 1979. From Kaduna, he moved to Maiha, Adamawa State, and attended Government Secondary School, Maiha.

He later enrolled into the College of Preliminary Studies in Yola and the College for Legal Studies, where he obtained a Diploma in Law. He completed degree programmes: Advanced Diploma in Business Administration at the Abubakar Tafawa Balewa University, Bauchi and Bachelor of Science in Political Science, University of Abuja, FCT. He also possess a Certificate in Governance and Anti-Corruption at the International Law Institute Washington DC, US.

== Political career ==
Yakub was elected to the Nigerian House of Representatives in 2015 representing the Gombi/Hong Federal Constituency of Adamawa State and appointed chairman, House Committee on Nigeria-China Relations. Throughout his tenure in office, he supported the China-Nigeria Agriculture Modernization Forum in 2017. He was re-elected in 2019 and served for two terms.

He was a major contender for the office of Speaker of the House of Representatives in 2019, where he ran alongside Femi Gbajabiamila.

He was appointed Chairman of the House Committee on Foreign Affairs at the 9th Assembly of the House of Representatives. He was instrumental to the advancement of peaceful diplomatic ties between Nigeria and Ghana when a major international crisis almost broke out due to a number of activities that stood against the peaceful ties between both countries, one of which was the demolition of the Nigerian High Commission Property in Accra Ghana in 2020. His leadership contributed to a peaceful resolution of the crises.

During the second term of Yakub at the House of Representatives as Chairman of the House Committee on Foreign Affairs, he introduced several reforms in the Ministry headquarters and the Nigerian Missions abroad in appropriating budget expenditure, with oversight function on budgetary expenditure.

- Director General, Nigerian Technical Aid Corps, Ministry of Foreign Affairs, Nigeria. 22 August 2023 - Till Date.
- Member, House of Representatives 2015 - 2023;
- Chairman, House Committee on Foreign Affairs, House of Representatives, Nigeria 2019 - 2023;
- Chairman, House Committee on Nigeria — China Relations, House of Representatives, Nigeria 2016 - 2019;
- Chairman, House of Representatives AD HOC Committee on Dapchi School Girls' kidnap 2017;
- Chairman, House of Representatives AD HOC Committee to Inquire and Determine Why the Eastern Port Complexes are not Being Put to Maximal Use, 2019.
- Chairman, Sub-Committee on Economic Development, Presidential Committee on Northeast Initiative (PCNI) 2016 - 2018.
- National Chairman, Advanced Congress of Democrats (Political Party) 2008 - 2014.
- Local Government Treasurer, Social Democratic Party (SDP), Hong Local Government Area, Adamawa State 1992 - 1993.
- State Organizing Secretary, United Nigeria Congress Party (UNCP), Adamawa State, 1996 - 1998.
- Member, National Accreditation Committee, People's Democratic Party (PDP) 1999.
- National Treasurer, Advanced Congress of Democrats (ACD) 2005 - 2006.
- Chairman, Technical Committee, Inter-Party Advisory Council (IPAC) 2011 - 2014.
- National Ex-Officio Member, Action AC, A Political Party) 2006 - 2008.
- Member, National Executive Committee, All Progressives Congress (APC).

On the 22nd of August 2023, Yakub was appointed as the Director General of the Nigerian Technical Aid Corps (also Known as the Directorate of Technical Aid Corps), an agency in the Federal Ministry of Foreign Affairs, Nigeria, by the President of Nigeria, Bola Ahmed Tinubu.

== Family life ==
He married Nancy Buba, in 1992. They have three children.

== Award ==
- The Centre for Ethics and Value Orientation, a Non-Governmental Organization (NGO) confers award of 'Ethical Excellence' on Yusuf Buba Yakub, member of the House of Representatives (Nigeria)
- Professional Fellowship Doctorate award of the Institute of the Chartered Economists of Nigeria (ICEN)

== Political party ==
Yakub is a member of the Nigerian Ruling Party, All Progressives Congress (APC)
