= Mahmoud Musa Kallamu =

Nigerian politician

Mahmoud Musa Kallamu is a Nigerian politician. He currently serves a Majority Leader representing Mayo Belwa Constituency in the Adamawa State House of Assembly.
