= Kaletapwa Farauta =

Nigerian academic and politician (born 1965)

Her Excellency Kaletapwa Farauta

Deputy Governor of Adamawa State
- Incumbent
- Assumed office 29 May 2023
- Governor: Ahmadu Umaru Fintiri
- Preceded by: Crowther Seth

Vice Chancellor of Adamawa State University
- In office 17 July 2017 – August 2022

Adamawa State Commissioner for Education
- In office 6 August 2015 – 17 July 2017
- Governor: Bindow Jibrilla
- Succeeded by: Julius Kadala

Personal details
- Born: 28 November 1965 (age 60) Numan, Northern Region (now in Adamawa State), Nigeria
- Citizenship: Nigeria
- Party: All Progressives Congress
- Education: Federal College of Education Yola; University of Nigeria, Nsukka; Federal University of Technology, Yola
- Occupation: Politician; academic

Kaletapwa George Farauta (born 28 November 1965) is a Nigerian professor and politician, who is the current deputy governor of Adamawa State since 2023. She was the vice chancellor of Adamawa State University, Mubi from 2017 to 2022. She is a former Adamawa State commissioner of education and executive chairman of Adamawa State Universal Basic Education Board.

== Biography ==
Kaletapwa Farauta was born on 28 November 1965 in Numan Local Government of Adamawa State. She obtained her primary school leaving certificate from Numan II Primary School, Numan in 1979. In 1983, she obtained her Senior School Certificate from Federal Government Girls College (FGGC) Yola. In 1987, she obtained her National Certificate in Education from Federal College of Education (FCE) Yola. She bagged her first and second degree in Agricultural Extension at the University of Nigeria Nsukka in 1989 and 1995 respectively. She obtained her PhD from Federal University of Technology currently known as Modibbo Adama Federal University of Technology, Yola in 2008.

Governor Ahmadu Umaru Fintiri selected her as his running mate under the platform of the People's Democratic Party (PDP) in 2022 for the 2023 general elections.

== Political appointments ==
From July to October, 2014, Farauta served as the Executive Chairman, Adamawa State Universal Basic Education Board (ADSUBEB). On 28 August 2015 Farauta assumed office as the Adamawa State Commissioner for Education and left office on 17 July 2017.

== Vice-chancellorship ==
On the 17 July 2017, she was made the acting vice chancellor of Adamawa State University by the then governor of the state, Senator Muhammad Umaru Jibrilla Bindow. She was eventually confirmed as the vice chancellor by Ahmadu Fintiri.

== Deputy Governor ==
In 2023, Farauta was elected as the first female deputy governor in the North East of Nigeria.
