= 2015 Adamawa State gubernatorial election =

2015 gubernatorial election in Adamawa State, Nigeria

- April 11, 2015
Nominee	Bindo Jibrilla	Markus Gundiri
Party	PDP	SDP
Running mate	Martins Babale
Popular vote	362,329	181,806
Governor before election
Murtala Nyako
PDP
Elected Governor
Bindo Jibrilla
APC

The 2015 Adamawa State gubernatorial election occurred in Nigeria on April 11, 2015. APC candidate Bindo Jibrilla won the election, defeating Markus Gundiri of the SDP.

Bindo Jibrilla emerged APC gubernatorial candidate after scoring 2,718 votes and defeating his closest rival, Ibrahim Mijinyawa Yayaji who received 2,268 votes. He picked Martins Babale as his running mate. Markus Gundiri was the SDP candidate. 8 candidates contested in the election.

== Electoral system ==
The Governor of Adamawa State is elected using the plurality voting system.

=== APC primary ===
The APC primary election was held on December 4, 2014. Ahmadu Umaru Fintiri won the primary election polling 1,656 votes against 5 other candidates. His closest rival was Ibrahim Mijinyawa Yayaji, who came second with 2,268 votes, Mustapha scored 515 votes, Ahmed Barata scored 452 votes, while Yakubu Tsalla and Emmanuel Bello got 147 and 50 votes respectively.

== Results ==
A total number of 8 candidates registered with the Independent National Electoral Commission to contest in the election.

Total number of votes cast was 706,092, while number of valid votes was 684,050. Rejected votes were 27,790.

Candidate	Party	Votes	%
Bindo Jibrilla	All Progressives Congress	362,329	44.41
Markus Gundiri	Social Democratic Party	181,806	22.28
Nuhu Ribadu	People's Democratic Party	98,917	12.12
Ahmed Modibbo	People's Democratic Movement	32,985	4.04
Other candidates		139,915	17.15
Total		815,952	100.00
Valid votes		815,952	96.71
Invalid/blank votes		27,790	3.29
Total votes		843,742	100.00
Source: Thenationonlineng
