= Adamu Kwanate =

Nigerian politician

State Representative
- Constituency: Nasarawo/Binyeri

Personal details
- Died: March 2019 (age 56)
- Occupation: Politician

Adamu Kwanate was a Nigerian politician who served as a member of the Adamawa State House of Assembly, representing the Nasarawo/Binyeri (Mayo Belwa 1) state constituency. He was a member of the All Progressives Congress (APC). He died in March 2019 at the age of 56. He is reported to have collapsed during a campaign in his constituency and rushed to a hospital in Yola, where he died.
