= Bathiya =

Bathiya is a given name. Notable people with the name include:

- Bathiya Jayakody (born 1976), member of Sri Lankan pop duo Bathiya and Santhush
- Bathiya Perera (born 1977), Sri Lankan cricketer
- Bathiya Wesley (fl. 2019), Nigerian politician
