= Jibril Aminu =

Nigerian professor of cardiology and politician (1939–2025)

Senator for Adamawa Central
- In office 3 June 2003 – 6 June 2011
- Preceded by: Abubakar Girei
- Succeeded by: Bello Mohammed Tukur

Personal details
- Born: Aminu Song; 25 August 1939 Song, Adamawa Province, Colony and Protectorate of Nigeria
- Died: 5 June 2025 (aged 85)
- Party: Peoples Democratic Party
- Spouse(s): Fatima Bukar Mulima; Ladi Ahmed
- Children: 9
- Occupation: Politician; Professor

Jibril Muhammad Aminu (25 August 1939 – 5 June 2025), previously known as Aminu Song, was a Nigerian professor of cardiology and politician. He was Nigeria's Ambassador to the United States from 1999 to 2003 and served as the senator representing Adamawa Central senatorial district from 2003 to 2011. He was a member of the Peoples Democratic Party (PDP).

== Early life and academic career ==
Aminu was born on 25 August 1939. Studying medicine, he obtained an M.B.B.S from the University of Ibadan in 1965, and a PhD in Medicine from the Royal Post-Graduate Medical School, London in 1972.

He was appointed a Fellow of the Nigerian Academy of Science in 1972, a Fellow of the Royal College of Physicians, London in 1980 and a Fellow of the West African College of Physicians also in 1980.

He was made a Distinguished Fellow of the Nigerian Postgraduate Medical College in 2004.

Aminu was a Consultant in Medicine, Senior Lecturer and Sub-Dean, Clinical Studies at the University of Ibadan Medical School (1973–1975), and Executive Secretary of the National Universities Commission (1975–1979).

He was Visiting Professor of Medicine at Howard University College of Medicine in Washington DC (1979–1980) and Vice-Chancellor of the University of Maiduguri, 1980–1985. He was also Professor of Medicine at the University of Maiduguri (1979–1995).

== Political career ==
Aminu held office as Federal Minister of Education and then Federal Minister of Petroleum and Mineral Resources (1989–1992).

While Petroleum Minister he was President of the African Petroleum Producers' Organization (1991) and President of the OPEC Conference (1991–1992).

He was elected a delegate to the National Constitutional Conference (1994–1995).

From 1999 to 2003, Aminu was Nigerian Ambassador to the United States of America.

Aminu was elected to the Senate for Adamawa Central in 2003 and reelected in 2007. As a Senator Aminu was appointed to committees on Foreign Affairs, Education, Air Force and Health. In a mid-term evaluation of Senators in May 2009, ThisDay said that he had not sponsored any bills, but had contributed to debates on some motions. He had managed the Foreign Affairs Committee well, and was very committed to the activities of the Committee on Education.

On 2 January 2010, Aminu was installed the "Bobaselu of The Source" by the Ooni of Ife, Oba Sijuwade.

== Personal life and death ==
Jibril Aminu was twice married. His second wife is Fatima Bukar Mulima who gave him three children. His divorced wife is Ladi Ahmed, who gave him six children. His sons Bashiru Aminu and Murtala Muhammad Aminu are economists and businessmen while his daughters work as lawyers (Nana Aminu) and dentists (Aminu Bello).

Aminu died on 5 June 2025, at the age of 85.
