= Ahmadu Fintiri =

Nigerian politician

His Excellency Ahmadu Fintiri
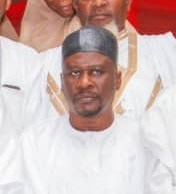

Governor of Adamawa State
- Incumbent
- Assumed office 29 May 2019
- Deputy: Crowther Seth; Kaletapwa Farauta
- Preceded by: Bindo Jibrilla
- Acting; 15 July 2014 – 8 October 2014
- Preceded by: Murtala Nyako
- Succeeded by: Bala James Ngilari
- Acting; 29 January 2012 – March 2012
- Preceded by: Murtala Nyako
- Succeeded by: Murtala Nyako

Speaker of the Adamawa State House of Assembly
- In office 10 October 2014 – 5 June 2015
- Preceded by: Kwamoti Bitrus Laori (acting)
- Succeeded by: Kabiru Mijinyawa
- In office March 2012 – 15 July 2014
- Preceded by: Kwamoti Bitrus Laori (acting)
- Succeeded by: Kwamoti Bitrus Laori (acting)
- In office 6 December 2011 – 26 January 2012
- Preceded by: Sadiq Ibrahim (impeached)
- Succeeded by: Kwamoti Bitrus Laori (acting)

Deputy Speaker of the Adamawa State House of Assembly
- In office ?–2011
- Speaker: James Shaibu Barka
- Succeeded by: Wale Fwa

Member of Adamawa State House of Assembly
- In office ? – 5 June 2015
- Succeeded by: Emmanuel Tsamdu
- Constituency: Madagali

Personal details
- Born: Ahmadu Umaru Fintiri; 27 October 1967 (age 58) Madagali, North-Eastern State (now in Adamawa State), Nigeria
- Party: All Progressives Congress
- Spouse: Lami Ahmadu Fintiri
- Children: 3
- Parents: Umaru Badami; Fatima Umar Badami
- Education: University of Maiduguri
- Occupation: Politician

Ahmadu Umaru Fintiri (born 27 October 1967) is a Nigerian politician who has served as the governor of Adamawa State since 2019. He was a member of the Adamawa State House of Assembly and served as Speaker of the Assembly. He became the acting governor of Adamawa State following the impeachment of Governor Murtala Nyako in July 2014, serving until 8 October 2014.

After the collation of results of the state gubernatorial election held on 9 March 2019, Fintiri emerged winner of the election with the highest number of votes. However, the election was declared inconclusive because the number of cancelled votes was greater than the margin between the winner and his close opponent. In the early hours of Friday 29 March, he was declared winner of the by-election having secured 376,552 votes to defeat the incumbent governor Bindo Jibrilla of the All Progressives Congress who polled 336,386 votes.

He was re-elected Into office in the 2023 General Elections. After the collation of results of the state gubernatorial election held on Saturday, March 18, 2023, Fintiri emerged winner of the election with the highest number of votes. However, the election was declared inconclusive. He was later declared winner of the by-election having secured 430,861 votes to defeat his closest rival Aishatu Dahiru Ahmed of the All Progressives Congress who polled 398,788 votes.

The final results were announced by the INEC Returning Officer in the state, Mohammed Mele, He won the supplementary election with 9,337 votes, Aisha Dahiru, popularly called Binani, of the All Progressives Congress (APC), who came second in the poll with 6,513 votes.He is a popular politician and former ally of Former Vice President, Atiku Abubabakar

== Early life and education ==
Fintiri was born on 27 October 1967 in Gulak, Madagali Local Government Area, Adamawa State, Nigeria. He attended Central Primary School, Gulak, from 1975 to 1981 and later studied at Government Day Secondary School, Gulak, and Government Secondary School, Michika, where he completed his secondary education. He obtained a bachelor's degree in History from the University of Maiduguri in 1992 and later earned a postgraduate diploma in Policy and Strategic Studies from the same university in 2004.

== Political career ==
In the 9 March 2019 Adamawa State gubernatorial election and upon the completion of 28 March 2019 Adamawa State supplementary election, Fintiri was declared winner of the election, having polled 376,552 votes defeating the incumbent governor, Bindo Jibrilla of the All Progressive Congress, who polled 336,386 votes.

He held a number of leadership positions in the House of Assembly before being elected Speaker, a position he held until 2015. Ahmadu Fintiri has twice been governor of Adamawa State. Following the impeachment of then-Governor Murtala Nyako in July 2014, he was appointed acting governor. He delegated control to Bala James Ngilari after three months.

=== Governor ===
On 9 March 2019, Ahmadu Fintiri, a member of the Peoples Democratic Party (PDP), was elected governor of Adamawa State. However, the election was declared inconclusive because the number of revoked ballots exceeded the margin between the winner and his closest opponent.

In March 2024, Fintiri launched an empowerment cash support scheme aimed at small-scale entrepreneurs.

==== Defection ====
Fintiri left the Peoples Democratic Party to join the All Progressives Congress on 27 February 2026.

==== Awards ====
Governor Fintiri receives Nigeria Excellence Awards in Public Service (NEAPS) Governor of the Year Award on Urban Infrastructure 2025.

Governor Fintiri also received the distinguished award for infrastructure delivery in Nigerian 2022, by the Federal government

== Controversies ==
=== High number of Media Aides ===
In August 2023, Fintiri appointed 47 aides to assist him in media-related matters as Governor of Adamawa state. He was granted approval to appoint 50 special advisers by the Adamawa State House of Assembly in June of the same year. The Governor appointed two Special Advisers, ten Senior Special Assistants, thirty-four Special Assistants on Social Media and Content Creation, and one Special Assistant and Master of Ceremonies Government Events.

This move sparked significant controversy nationwide, with many criticizing the high number of appointments, deeming it wasteful and extravagant. Critics pointed out that Adamawa state had a considerable population of 3.44 million people living in poverty, ranking 19th in the nationwide Multidimensional Poverty Index (MPI).

On October 6, the governor's spokesperson announced an additional 103 appointments, comprising 37 principal special assistants, 45 senior special assistants, and 21 special assistants. This brought the total number of aides to approximately 150, with an estimated monthly cost to the state of 28 million naira, as reported by Daily Trust.

However, the governor's press secretary, Humwashi Wonosikou, countered the notion of extravagance, explaining that each media appointee had been assigned specific roles, and these appointments were also intended to address poverty issues in the state. He stated, "There is no need for concern regarding the social media assistants. Their responsibility is to promote government policies and programs. The governor's decision to engage them was driven by the desire for poverty alleviation."

One of the media aides appointed, speaking anonymously to Daily Trust, expressed confidence that their role would not be redundant due to the clear definition of their responsibilities. He stated that the employment of 34 social media assistants would "help sanitise posts on various online platforms."

== Personal life ==
Fintiri is married to Lami Ahmadu Fintiri and they have three children. In 2020, Fintiri lost his mother Hajiya Fatima Umar Badami who died after a long illness at the Federal Medical Centre, Yola His father, Umaru Badami, died after a long illness at the Federal Medical Centre (FMC) in Yola. Mr. Badami, 82, left the Army in 1984. He was afterwards buried in the Yola's Damare Muslim cemetery in accordance with Islamic customs.

== See also ==
- List of governors of Adamawa State
