= Abdulmalik Jauro Musa =

Nigerian politician

Abdulmalik Jauro Musa (died 24 May 2024) was a Nigerian politician. He served as a deputy minority whip at the Adamawa State House of assembly representing Ganye constituency. He died on 24 May 2024.
