= Abdullahi Ahmadu =

Nigerian politician (born 1981)

Ahmadu Abdullahi (born 1981) is a Nigerian politician from Adamawa State. He was a member represented Leko/Koma (Jada I) State constitancy in 2019 Adamawa State House of Assembly election. His most recent candidacy was in the 2023 Adamawa State House of Assembly election Elections, where he ran as a candidate representing Leko/Koma (Jada I) for the All Progressives Congress (APC).
