= Bello Mohammed Tukur =

Nigerian politician (born 1960)

Senator for Adamawa Central
- In office 6 June 2011 – 6 June 2015
- Preceded by: Jibril Aminu
- Succeeded by: Abdul-Aziz Nyako

Deputy Governor of Adamawa State
- In office 29 May 1999 – 29 May 2007
- Governor: Boni Haruna
- Succeeded by: Bala James Ngilari

Personal details
- Born: 1 January 1960 (age 66)
- Party: Peoples Democratic Party
- Occupation: Politician

Bello Mohammed Tukur (born 1 January 1960) is a Nigerian politician who served as the senator representing Adamawa Central senatorial district from 2011 to 2015. He previously served as deputy governor of Adamawa State from 1999 to 2007.

Tukur became deputy governor due to the influence of Vice President Atiku Abubakar. For the 2007 elections, he left the Peoples Democratic Party (PDP) and attempted to become the Action Congress candidate for governor, but after failing to win the party's primary, he returned to the PDP as a supporter of Professor Jibril Aminu, and Admiral Murtala Nyako. As Governor Nyako's Chief of Staff he wielded considerable power, but did not make him popular.

A wealthy man, Tukur was a late entrant in the competition for the 2011 PDP nomination for Adamawa Central Senatorial District, which he was said to have won due to Nyako's influence. He won the nomination with 1,095 votes. David Garvnwa came second with 378 votes and former Senator Abubakar Girei got 185 votes.

In the 9 April 2011 election for the Adamawa Central Senatorial seat, Tukur won with 95,806 votes. Alhaji Dahiru Bobbo of the Labour Party received 78,424 votes, Fatima Balla Abubakar of the Action Congress of Nigeria (ACN) received 63,271 votes and Engineer Hayatu Z. Abubakar of the Congress for Progressive Change (CPC) gained 44,476 votes. The result was a surprise to pundits who had expected a more charismatic Dahiru Bobbo to be the winner.

In 2021, alongside Lagos Governor, Babjide Sanwo-Olu, Seyi Tinubu and Abel Egbarin, he was given an award for his service as governor at the Media Nite Out Awards.
