= Kamwe language =

Chadic language spoken in Nigeria and Cameroon

Kamwe
- Native to: Nigeria and Cameroon
- Region: Adamawa State and Borno State
- Native speakers: (660,000 cited 1982–2020)
- Language family: Afro-Asiatic: Chadic; Biu–Mandara; Bura–Hig; Hig (A.3); Kamwe
- Dialects: Psikyɛ (Tsepkye)

Language codes
- ISO 639-3: hig – inclusive code Individual code: kvj – Psikye
- Glottolog: kamw1239 Kamwe psik1239 Psikye

Kamwe (also spelt Kamue) natively known as Vecemwe is a Chadic language native to Adamawa State and Borno State of Nigeria as well as to North-Western Cameroon.

In Nigeria, about 80 percent of the Kamwe people are found in Michika Local Government Area of Adamawa State, Nigeria. They are also found in Mubi North, Hong, Gombi, Song and Madagali local governments in Adamawa State. The Kamwe people are also found in Borno State, especially in Askira/Uba and Gwoza local government areas

Blench (2019) lists Mukta of Mukta village, Adamawa State as part of the Kamwe cluster.

== Etymology and names ==
Kamwe is a compound word derived from the words "Ka" and "Mwe" which means "People of". Kamwe stands for people of the same consanguinity and affinity. It means family kindred. Relatives bound together. It derived its meaning from a special type of native Kamwe ornament worn by close relatives of a deceased person as a mark of identity and empathy.

According to Kamwe elders, the "Mwe" is the mark of true identity of relatives in Kamweland. In the past, if a non-relative wears the Mwe, it can leads to conflict with the real relatives. Only close relatives are allowed to wear the Mwe. Because the "Mwe" is the true identity of close relatives and cements the bond between them. Those wearing the Mwe will hug themselves saying "Tselie ra na" (You are my relative). Some elders still opine that the Kamwe means people of the heavens, people on the hills, mountains and even the sky in Vecemwe. There are more than 24 dialects of Vecemwe (Kamwe language) but Nkafa is the central dialect and is reduced into writing and literature.

The Kamwe people and language were called Higi (Higgi)/hagyi or hiji as pronounced by Fulani in the past. Kamwe elders say "Higgi" is an offensive, derogatory word coined by Margi people to insult and demean the Kamwe people. Insult in Kamwe language (Vecemwe) is call 'Ngelai.' The offensive and derogatory word "higgi" was coined from "hagyi" grasshopper and scornfully tagged on the Kamwe by their neighbours the Margi, to mock the Kamwe in the past because of the Kamwe women's huge appetite for grasshopper which they go hunting near River Yadszeram. The majority of the Kamwe people despise the derogatory and offensive word 'Higgi' except some few people in Dakwa (Bazza) area who are originally of Margi origin. Because grasshopper from which the derogatory word "higgi" is derived is a hopeless insect in Kamwe culture eaten by lizards and frogs because they are weak and vulnerable.

The Margi first called the Kamwe people "Higi" in 1937.

Large number of Kamwe elders interviewed said that despite their objection to the word higgi in the past, the Church of the Brethren Missionary (CBM) who arrived in Lassa town from Garkida in 1929 still went ahead to document it despite the protest by Kamwe people who attend CBM school and missionary hospitals in Lassa. The Kamwe peoples' motto is Dabeghi Nji Denama (There is strength in unity)

== Dialects ==
There are twenty-four active dialects of the Kamwe language. The active Kamwe language dialects include Nkafa, Dakwa, Krghea (sometimes called Higgi Fali), Fwea, Humsi, Modi, Sina, and Tilyi; Blench (2006) considers Psikye to be another.

== Phonology ==
=== Vowels ===
	Front	Central	Back
Close	i	ə	u
Close-mid	e	ə	o
Open-mid	ɛ		ɔ
Open		a	

- /ə/ is phonetically raised as [ə̝].

=== Consonants ===
		Labial	Alveolar		Palatal	Velar	Glottal
		Labial	plain	sibilant	Palatal	Velar	Glottal
Nasal		m	n			ŋ	
Stop/ Affricate	voiceless	p	t	t͡s	t͡ʃ	k	ʔ
Stop/ Affricate	voiced	b	d	d͡z	d͡ʒ	ɡ	
Stop/ Affricate	implosive	ɓ	ɗ				
Fricative	voiceless	f	ɬ	s	ʃ	x	
Fricative	voiced	v	ɮ	z	ʒ	ɣ	
Approximant		w	l		j		
Trill			r				

== People ==
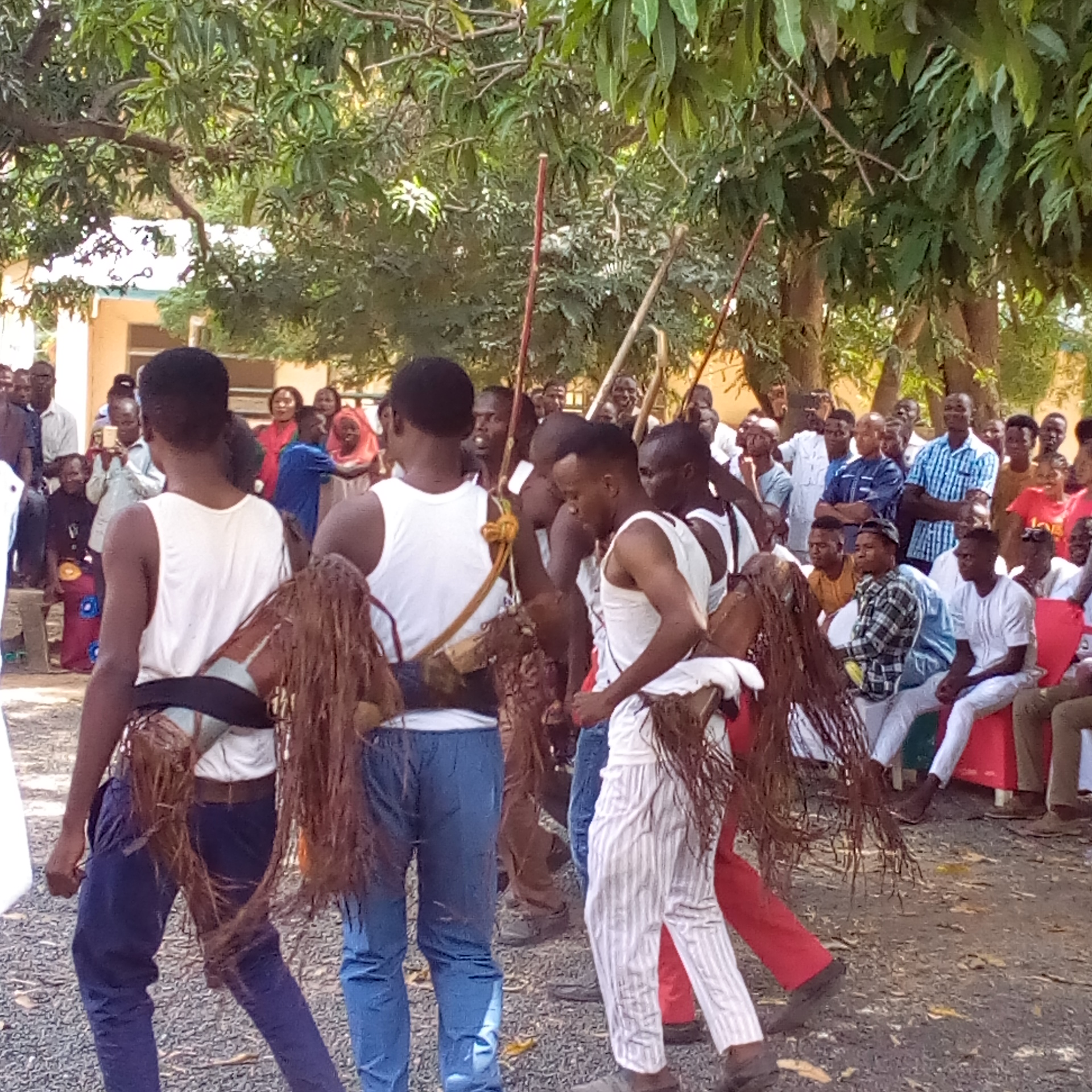
Kamwe cultural dancers.

Most Kamwe identify themselves with Mwe-ci-ka (Michika), the ancestral home of all Kamwe people. The name Mwecika (Michika) is a Nkafa phrase which means creeping in silently to hunt. Depicting how Kwada Kwakaa the warrior was moving on the Michika hills to hunt his games. Kamwe literally means people of the same "consanguinity and affinity". The Kamwe people believe in a heavenly God called 'Hyalatamwe' Communication with Hyalatamwe directly is not possible in Kamwe culture. Hyalatamwe is revered and feared. Communication with him has to be through intermediaries called "Da melie or Tchehye shwa."

In the Kamwe culture, caste system does exist as the Kamwe race is broadly classified into 'Melie and Ka-Ligyi'.

The founder of Michika (Mwe-ci-ka) was said to be one Kwada Kwakaa, a prince from Kuli in Nkafamiya on the hills of Michika. Kwada Kwakaa was said to be a warrior hunter who could hunt lions and leopards just by himself. When his father, who was the King in Nkafamiya, got to know that Kwada was 'kwa' 'kaa', he mandated Kwada to be the ruler in the present day Michika.

What is unique about the Kamwe people's culture is the way the name their children according to the child's birth from the mother. A first-born male child is named Tizhe, a first-born female child Kuve. The first ten children in Kamwe culture are named as follows:- First male child is Tizhe, the female child is Kuve. The second male child is Zira, the female is Masi. The third male child is Tumba, the female is Kwarramba, the fourth male child is Vandi, the female is Kwanye. The fifth child is Kwaji whether male or female. The sixth child is Tari for male and Kwata for female. The seventh child is sini for male and Kwasini for female. The eight child is Kwada for both male and Female. The ninth child is Drambi for both the male and female. The tenth child is called Kwatri for both the male and female child. Subsequently, any other child will have a suffix "hale" attached to the name signifying that the child was born in old age of the mother. Example is Kuve-hale or Zira-hale as the case may be.

Twins or multiple births are celebrated in Kamwe culture. Twins have special names depending on the gender and who is delivered first. The first male twin is called Thakma, the second male twin is Pembi. First female twin is Thakma, and the second female twin is Kwalgha.

Before the advent of Western legal system in Africa and especially Nigeria, the Kamwe People had an organised legal system of the King called "Mbege" as the sole adjudicator. Adjudication in Kamwe Language is called "Kita".

To enhance cultural renaissance in Kamweland, annual cultural festival tagged "Kamwe People Annual Cultural Festival of Art and Culture has been staged in Michika Adamawa State Nigeria every First (1st) Saturday in the month of April every year since 2017. It is aimed at reviving the rich culture of the Kamwe people and attracts tourists from far and near."

During the maiden edition in 2017, a book titled the 'Kamwe People of Northern Nigeria: Origin, History and Culture was presented to the public.
