= Bathiya Wesley =

Nigerian politician

Speaker of the Adamawa State House of Assembly
- Incumbent
- Assumed office 12 June 2023
- Preceded by: Aminu Iya Abbas

Member of the Adamawa State House of Assembly
- Incumbent
- Assumed office June 2019
- Preceded by: Hassan Burguma
- Constituency: Hong

Personal details
- Born: Bathiya Wesley Mava’ama
- Party: Peoples Democratic Party

Bathiya Wesley is a Nigerian politician and the speaker of the Adamawa State House of Assembly. He was sworn in during the inaugural session of the Adamawa 8th Assembly. Wesley is disabled, having had his arm amputated earlier in his life. He represents the Hong constituency at the Adamawa State House of Assembly.

Commitment to Peace

In March 2025, following reports of recurring insurgent attacks in several communities in Hong Local Government Area of Adamawa State, Wesley reiterated the importance of peace as a prerequisite for development. During a courtesy visit by Dr. Herbert Rufus Hanawa, Principal Special Assistant to Governor Ahmadu Umaru Fintiri on Budget, he assured that the Assembly would lobby for measures to restore peace and improve security in the affected areas. Wesley stressed that the safety and well-being of displaced residents remained a priority, reflecting his reputation as a politician committed to peace and community stability.
