= 2019 Adamawa State House of Assembly election =

The 2019 Adamawa State House of Assembly election was held on 9 March 2019, to elect members of the Adamawa State House of Assembly in Nigeria. All the 25 seats were up for election in the Adamawa State House of Assembly.

Aminu Iya Abbas from PDP representing Uba/Gaya constituency was elected Speaker, while Pwamwakaino Mackondo from PDP representing Numan constituency was elected Deputy Speaker.

== Results ==
The result of the election is listed below.

- Kefas Japhet from PDP won Gombi constituency
- Donglok Adawa from PDP won Guyuk constituency
- Aminu Iya Abbas from PDP won Uba/Gaya constituency
- Wesley Barthiya from PDP won Hong constituency
- Abdullahi Ahmadu from APC won Leko/Koma constituency
- Yuttisori Hamman-Tukur from PDP won Jada/Mbulo constituency
- Raymond Kate from PDP won Demsa constituency
- Shuaibu Babas from APC won Furore/Gurin constituency
- Abdullahi Yapak from APC won Fufore/Verre constituency
- Alhassan Hamman Joda from APC won Ganye constituency
- Mohammed Mutawalli Alhaji from APC won Girei constituency
- Ibrahim Musa from ADC won Mayo-Belwa constituency
- Kwada Joseph Ayuba from PDP won Michika constituency
- Shuaibu Musa from APC won 28,271 Mubi North constituency
- Musa Umar Bororo from APC won Mubi South constituency
- Mackondo Pwamakeno from PDP won Numan constituency
- Abubakar Isa from APC won Shelleng constituency
- Simon Isa from PDP won Song constituency
- Abdullahi Umar from APC won Toungo constituency
- Sajo Hamidu A. from PDP won Yola North constituency
- Kabiru Mijinyawa from APC won Yola South constituency
- Myandasa Bauna from PDP won Lamurde constituency
- Haruna Jkan Tikiri from PDP won Madagali constituency
- Isa Yahaya from APC won Maiha constituency
- Nashion Umar Gubi from PDP won Nasarawo/Binyeri constituency
