= 2007 Adamawa State gubernatorial election =

State election in Nigeria

- 14 April 2007
Nominee	Murtala Nyako	Joel Madaki
Party	PDP	LP
Popular vote	336,892	86,684
Governor before election
Boni Haruna
PDP
Elected Governor
Murtala Nyako
PDP

The 2007 Adamawa State gubernatorial election was the 4th gubernatorial election of Adamawa State. Held on 14 April 2007, the People's Democratic Party nominee Murtala Nyako won the election, defeating Joel Madaki of the Labour Party.

== Results ==
Murtala Nyako from the People's Democratic Party won the election, defeating Joel Madaki from the Labour Party. Registered voters was 1,315,950.

2007 Adamawa State gubernatorial election
Party	Candidate	Votes	%	±%
PDP	Murtala Nyako	336,892		
LP	Joel Madaki	86,684		
PDP hold				
