= Abubakar Girei =

Nigerian politician (born 1954)

Senator for Adamawa Central
- In office 3 June 1999 – 3 June 2003
- Preceded by: Hamman Bello
- Succeeded by: Jubril Aminu

Personal details
- Born: 14 March 1954 (age 72)
- Party: Peoples Democratic Party
- Education: B. Sc Quantity Surveying, MBA, Ahmadu Bello University, Zaria
- Alma mater: Ahmadu Bello University
- Profession: Quantity Surveyor

Abubakar Halilu Girei (born 14 March 1954) is a Nigerian politician who served as the senator representing Adamawa Central senatorial district from 1999 to 2003, at the start of the Nigerian Fourth Republic.

After taking his seat in the Senate he was appointed to committees on Senate Services, Banking & Currency, Internal Affairs (Vice Chairman) and Local & Foreign Debts.

In January 2011, Girei was a contender to be the Peoples Democratic Party (PDP) candidate for the Adamawa Central Senatorial District in the 2011 elections, but came third in the primaries. Alhaji Bello Tukur, former chief of staff to Governor Murtala Nyako, was declared winner.

== Early life and education ==
Senator Abubakar H. Girei was born on 14 March 1954 in Girei Local Government Area of Adamawa State. He attended the famous Barewa College, Zaria for his secondary education and Ahmadu Bello University Zaria, where he obtained a Bachelor of Science Degree in Quantity Surveying and Masters in Business Administration (MBA). He is a Chartered Quantity Surveyor, Real Estate Developer and a Construction Management Consultant.

Senator Girei is a Fellow of Nigerian Institute of Quantity Surveyors, a Fellow of the Nigerian Institute of Management and also a member of the prestigious National Institute of Policy and Strategic Studies (NIPSS) Kuru, Jos where he served as the Monitor General of SEC 31.

== Career ==
After his National Youth Service in Port Harcourt, Rivers State in 1979, he worked for the defunct Gongola State Government as a Quantity Surveyor and rose to the rank of Principal Quantity Surveyor in 1984. Senator Abubakar Girei then moved on to the Nigeria Agricultural and Cooperative Bank Limited in 1985 as Manager, Property Division and then became the General Manager, Estate Department, from 1988 to 1996. He resigned to set up his consultancy firm, Premier Association Consultants which he ran as Managing Director and Chief Executive Officer between 1996 and 1999.

The years 1999 to 2003 marked a turning point in the career of Senator Abubakar Girei when he contested and was duly elected to the office of the Distinguished Senator of the Federal Republic of Nigeria representing Adamawa Central Senatorial District in the 1st Senate of the 4th Republic from 1999 to 2003. As a Senator, he served as Chairman, Senate Committee on Services, Vice Chairman, Senate Committee on Internal Affairs, Vice Chairman, Senate Committee on Solid Minerals and also as member of Committee on Defense (Air Force), Police Affairs, Banking and Currency, Culture and Tourism, Transport, Gas, Drugs and Financial Crime and Local and Foreign Debt. Senator Abubakar Girei has also served on the boards of numerous public and private companies as well as Tertiary Institutions. These include Realex Properties as President and CEO, Premier Associated Consultants as Chairman, University of Calabar Teaching Hospital Governing Council, a member of the Governing Council of Nigeria Institute of Management, the National Teachers Institute and the National Agricultural Production and Research Institute, Zaria to mention but a few. Senator Abubakar Girei is a major stakeholder in the People’s Democratic Party, Adamawa State and the North East Geo-Political Zone of Nigeria.
