= Binta Nyako =

Nigerian judge (born 1959)

Honourable Justice Binta Nyako
- Born: Binta Fatimat Remawa; May 14, 1959 (age 66); Remawa, Katsina Province; Northern Region, British Nigeria (now in Katsina State)
- Education: Queen's College, Lagos; Ahmadu Bello University; Nigerian Law School
- Occupations: Lawyer; jurist
- Spouse: Murtala Nyako

Justice Binta Nyako (born May 14, 1959) is a judge of the Federal High Court of Nigeria from Katsina State. She is the current President of the International Association of Women Judges and has previously served as the President of the Nigeria's National Association of Women Judges. She served as the chief judge of Bauchi State from 2014 to 2017, becoming the first woman to hold this position in the state and the first woman to lead a high court bench in Nigeria.

== Early life and education ==
Binta Nyako was born in the town of Remawa (now in Rimi) in the Katsina Province of Northern Nigeria.

Between 1972 and 1976, Nyako attended Queen's College in Lagos for her secondary school education. In 1980, she obtained her Law degree from Ahmadu Bello University, followed by graduation from the Nigerian Law School a year later, becoming Katsina's first ever female lawyer.

== Career ==
From 1983 to 1993, Nyako served as a State Counsel at the Ministry of Justice of Katsina State, eventually becoming the Solicitor General of the state in 1989. Between 1994 and 1996, she served as Attorney General and Commissioner for Justice of Katsina State. Since July 2000, she has served as a Judge of the Federal High Court of Nigeria, becoming one of its longest serving judges. In 2014, she was appointed as the first female Chief Judge of Bauchi State, a position she held until 2017. This appointment also made her the first woman to lead a high court bench in Nigeria. In 2023, she was elected as the President of the International Association of Women Judges, becoming the association's first Muslim president.

== Personal life ==
Justice Nyako is married to Vice Admiral Murtala Nyako, former Military Governor of Niger State and former Governor of Adamawa State.
