= Kate Raymond Mamuno =

Nigerian politician

- Born: Adamawa
- Citizenship: Nigeria
- Occupation: Politician

Kate Raymond Mamuno is a Nigerian politician and lawmaker. She currently serves as a Majority Leader of the Adamawa State House of Assembly representing Demsa constituency in Adamawa state.
