= Federal Medical Centre, Yola =

Federal Medical Centre in Nigeria

Geography
- Location: Yola, Adamawa State, Nigeria

Organisation
- Type: General hospital

Services
- Emergency department: Available

History
- Founded: 1998

Links
- Website: www.fmcyola.gov.ng
- Lists: Hospitals in Nigeria

Federal Medical Centre, Yola is a federal government of Nigeria medical centre located in Yola, Adamawa State, Nigeria. The former chief medical director is Auwal Abubakar.

== History ==
Federal Medical Centre, Yola was established on 21 August 1998. The hospital was formerly known as Yola Specialist Hospital, Yola.

== CMD ==
The former chief medical director is Auwal Abubakar which was succeeded by the new chairman appointed by president Bola Ahmed Tinubu is Bashir Gumel.

== Departments ==
Federal Medical Centre Yola has both a clinical and non clinical department.

=== Clinical department ===
Department of Anaesthesia

Department of anatomy and forensic department

Department of Accident and emergency

Department of chemical pathology

Department of dental and maxillofacial

Department of dietetics

Department of family medicine

Department of Haematology and blood transfusion

Department of health information management

Department of internal medicine

Department of medical and welfare

Department of nursing science

Department of gynecology

Department of Otorhinolaryngology

Department of orthopedic and trauma

Department of paedratics

Department of pharmacy

Department of physiotherapy

Department of public health

Department of surgery.

=== Non clinical department ===
Administration

Audit

CMD office

Ict

Accounting and information

Procurement

Store

== Upgrade To Teaching Hospital. ==
The federal medical center yola was upgrade to Madibo Adama university teaching hospital by the federal government in December 2024.

== Separation of Twins ==
There was a separation of conjoined twins in the federal medical center yola which makes it the third successful conjoined twins separation in the medical center.
