= Aliyu Musdafa College =

Coordinates: 9.20712546°N 12.47109443°E

- Yola, Adamawa; Nigeria

Aliyu Musdafa College (or AMC Yola) is a school located in Yola, Adamawa, Nigeria. The principal of the college is Alh Ibrahim H/Adama Tukur, the 20th principal of the college since its inception. The school has day and boarding students.

== History ==
The school was established on 15 January 1969, under the name Aliyu Musdafa Secondary School with 25 boys and two teachers. Mrs Helen Qurashi was the pioneer principal. The Sultan of Sokoto Siddiq Abubakar III officially opened the school on 21 March 1970 when the military government took over the running of school. In September 1973 the school was renamed Yelwa Government Secondary School. In 1994 the administrative system of the school was decentralized. The school was then partitioned into two separate schools; namely Yelwa Government Senior Secondary School and Yalwa Government Junior Secondary School. However, in 2000 the schools were merged and renamed Aliyu Musdafa College.
