= Kabiru Mijinyawa =

Nigerian politician

Kabiru Mijinyawa is a Nigerian politician. He was the former Speaker of the 6th Adamawa State House of Assembly, representing Yola South constituency.
