= Musa Umar Bororo =

Nigerian politician

State Representative
- In office 2019–2023
- Constituency: Mubi South

Personal details
- Party: People's Democratic Party (Nigeria)
- Occupation: Politician

Musa Umar Bororo is a Nigerian politician and lawmaker. He served as a member of the Adamawa State House of Assembly representing Mubi South Constituency in 2019 under the All Progressives Congress defected to the People's Democratic Party.

In March 2023, Bororo was sacked by the Federal High Court as a member of the Adamawa State House of Assembly.
