= Bala James Ngilari =

Nigerian politician and lawyer (born 1972)

Bala James Nggilari

Governor of Adamawa State
- In office 8 October 2014 – 29 May 2015
- Preceded by: Umaru Fintiri (acting)
- Succeeded by: Bindo Jibrilla

Deputy Governor of Adamawa State
- In office 29 April 2008 – 15 July 2014
- Governor: Murtala Nyako
- Succeeded by: Martins Babale
- In office 29 May 2007 – 26 February 2008
- Governor: Murtala Nyako
- Preceded by: Bello Tukur

Personal details
- Born: 4 December 1972 (age 53)
- Party: All Progressive Congress
- Other political affiliations: Peoples Democratic Party
- Spouse: Hanatu Bala Ngilari
- Children: 7
- Occupation: Politician; lawyer

Bala James Nggilari, born 4 December 1952, in Lassa, Borno State, is a Nigerian lawyer and politician who served as the Governor of Adamawa State from October 2014 to May 2015. He assumed the governorship following the impeachment of his predecessor, Murtala Nyako. Prior to this, Nggilari served as Deputy Governor under Nyako from 2007 to 2014. He was succeeded in 2015 by Bindo Jibrilla.

In March 2017, Ngilari was sentenced to five years in jail without option of fine by a Yola High court for corruption, but was soon afterward acquitted and freed by the Court of Appeal in July.
