= Mohammed Buba Jijiwa =

Nigerian politician

Deputy Speaker of the Adamawa State House of Assembly
- Incumbent
- Assumed office 13 June 2023
- Constituency: Jada/Mbulo

Personal details
- Party: People's Democratic Party (PDP)
- Occupation: Politician

Mohammed Buba Jijiwa is a Nigerian politician and Deputy Speaker of the Adamawa State House of Assembly. He represents the Jada Mbulo constituency and was elected unopposed.

== Early life ==
Jijiwa is a Nigerian politician from Adamawa State, Nigeria.

== Political career ==
Jijiwa is a member of the Adamawa State House of Assembly, representing the Jada/Mbulo constituency. He was elected to the Assembly and later became the Deputy Speaker of the 10th Adamawa State House of Assembly.
