= Federal College of Education Yola =

Post secondary institution in Jimeta, Yola, Nigeria

- Type: Public
- Established: 1974
- Affiliations: University of Maiduguri
- Provost: Dr. Mohammed Usman Degereji
- Location: Yola, Adamawa State, Nigeria
- Website: www.fceyola.edu.ng

Federal College of Education, Yola is one of the post secondary institution in Adamawa State. It is located in Jimeta, Yola and the current provost is Dr. Mohammed Usman Degereji.

== History ==
Federal College of Education Yola (formerly known as Federal Advanced Teachers’ College FATC) was established as a teacher training institution in 1974 and it was not opened until 1975 with one hundred and fifty students. In 1984, it was renamed as Federal College of Education and in 1989, it became autonomous in line with the Degree No, 4 of 1989 that founded National Commission for Colleges of Education (NCCE) as a regulatory body for the colleges.

== Schools and Departments ==
The school operates the following schools:

- School of Arts and Social Sciences
- School of General Education
- School of Language Programmes
- School of Adults Education
- School of Early Childhood Care and Primary Education
- School of Sciences and
- School of Vocational Studies
