= Shuaibu Babas =

Nigerian politician (died 2025)

Member of the Adamawa State House of Assembly
- Constituency: Fufore/Gurin Constituency

Personal details
- Born: Adamawa State, Nigeria
- Died: 23 April 2025
- Party: Peoples Democratic Party (PDP)
- Occupation: Politician

Shuaibu Babas (died 23 April 2025) was a Nigerian politician who served as the representative for the Fufore/Gurin constituency at the Adamawa State House of Assembly. He died on 23 April 2025.
