= Martins Babale =

Nigerian politician (born 1959)

Deputy Governor of Adamawa State
- In office 29 May 2015 – 29 May 2019
- Governor: Bindo Jibrilla
- Preceded by: Bala James Ngilari
- Succeeded by: Crowther Seth

Personal details
- Born: 1 January 1959 (age 67)
- Party: All Progressive Congress
- Other political affiliations: Peoples Democratic Party
- Occupation: Politician

Martins Babale (born 1 January 1959) is a Nigerian politician who served as deputy governor of Adamawa State from 2015 to 2019. He was elected into office in 2015 alongside Bindo Umaru Jibrilla. He was elected twice to the House of Representatives, From 2003 to 2007, he served in the 5th National Assembly, representing the Jada/Aganye/Toungo/M’belwa Federal Constituency under the People's Democratic Party (PDP). Before that, he represented the Gombi/Hong Federal Constituency from 1990 to 2003.

== See also ==
List of members of the House of Representatives of Nigeria, 2003–2007
