= Crowther Seth =

Nigerian politician (born 1954)

Deputy Governor of Adamawa State
- In office 29 May 2019 – 29 May 2023
- Governor: Umaru Fintiri
- Preceded by: Martins Babale
- Succeeded by: Kaletapwa Farauta

Personal details
- Born: 15 December 1954 (age 71)
- Party: Peoples Democratic Party
- Occupation: Politician

Crowther Seth (born 15 December 1954) is a Nigerian politician who served as deputy governor of Adamawa State from 2019 to 2023. He previously served as the chairman of Lamurde Local Government Area of Adamawa State and as commissioner for the Ministry of Chieftaincy Affairs in Adamawa. Seth was a legal adviser to the Peoples Democratic Party prior to his nomination and election as deputy governor.
