= Michika =

Michika Mwecika (Kamwe)
- LGA and town
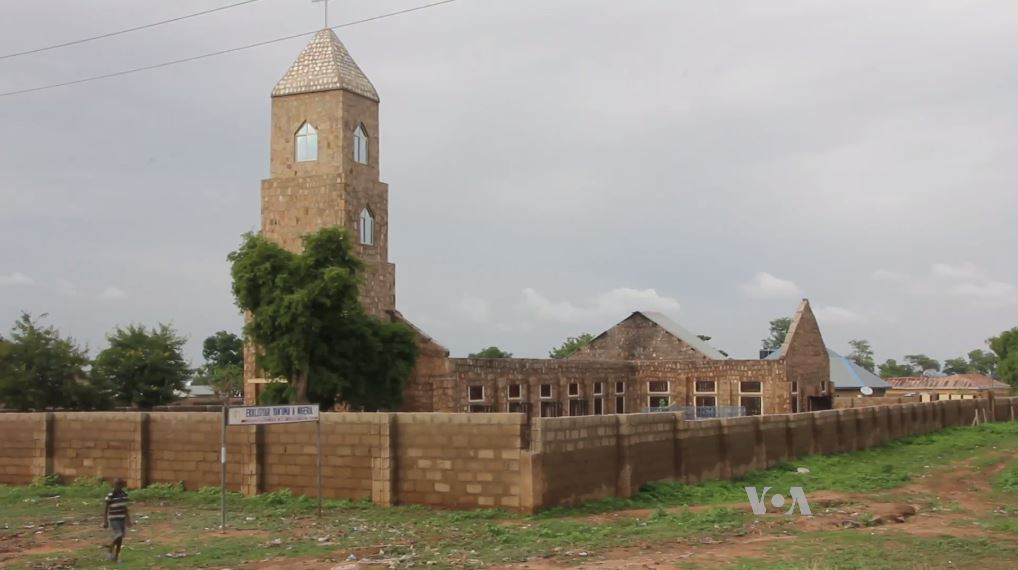
- Interactive map of Michika
- Location within Nigeria
- Coordinates: 10°37′N 13°23′E
- Country: Nigeria
- State: Adamawa State

Area
  - Total: 822.3 km^{2} (317.5 sq mi)
- Elevation: 0 m (0 ft)

Population (2022)
  - Total: 239,400
  - Density: 291.1/km^{2} (754.0/sq mi)
- Time zone: UTC+1 (WAT)

Michika (Mwe-cika) is a town and Local Government Area in Adamawa State, Nigeria, it is the administrative headquarters of the local government. It is in Northern Adamawa State and located directly across the border from the famous tourist site of Mcedigyi in vecemwe Rhumsiki in Cameroon. Mwe-cika (Michika) is the fourth largest town in Adamawa State.

== Geography ==
The principal ethnic group and language in Mwecika (Michika) is the Kamwe people and they speak Vecemwe

Michika local government was created in 1976. It is located is bordered on the east by the Republic of Cameroon. On its northern border is Madagali local government, while it shares border to the west by the Askira/Uba local government area of Borno State.

To the south, it is bordered by Mubi North and Hong local government areas.

== Demography ==
In a 2023 demographic survey of Internally displaced persons (IDPs), the area was found to be majorly Hausa and Kamwe speaking. The most predominant languages (spoken at homes and places of primary residence) present in the local government area were; Hausa – 61.8%, Kamwe – 30.9%, Fulfulde, specifically Eastern or Adamawa Fulfulde – 6.1%, with Marghi and English at 0.6% each. This data was not obtained from a nationally co-ordinated population headcount. The last time Nigeria included ethnic and linguistic data in its enumeration parameters was in the national census of 1963.

== Origin of the settlement ==
The word 'Michika' is the corrupted form of the Kamwe phrase for "Mwe-che ci-ka", which is the Kamwe word for "creeping in silently". Oral history has it that Michika (Mwecika) was founded around the late 15th century by Kwada Kwakaa who was a Prince and a hunter hunting on the plains of Michika hills.

The name Mwecika(Michika) originated from the statement "Mwe che ci ka ra Kwada Kwakaa"; which Kamwe historians and elders have said it translates to the "hills where Kwada Kwakaa goes stealthily to hunt. From hence it is shortened to "Mwe che ci ka" and eventually to Mwecika(Michika)

Idris Alooma the Kanuri ruler of sixteen century made reference to Mwecika (Michika) and the Kamwe people in his odyssey.

Likewise Heinrich Barth the German explorer in his book, "Travels in Africa" described 1850 wrote about the bravery of the Kamwe people of Michika.

== Michika Districts ==
Michika is made of nine districts namely Michika District, Nkafa District, Madzi District, Futu District, Garta District, Bazza/Yambule/Dakwa District, Zah/Ghye District, Vi/Bokka District and Sina/Kamale District. The Dakwa dialect also called Bazza which is the corrupted form of the Margi word pazza, many of them prefer to be called Higgi. Others call it hagyi while other spell it higi. Kamwe elders say that higgi is the grasshopper (hagyi) that is a derogatory word coined by the Margi people to insult the Kamwe women who were fond of hunting grasshoppers in the past to make jest of and scorn the Kamwe because of their women's and children's huge appetite for grasshopper in the past. Kamwe people despise the derogatory and spiteful word "higgi" as they higgi is an insult to them. They identify themselves as Kamwe (Kamwe means "People of the same consanguinity). The Kamwe People are highly industrious, hospitable and republican in nature. They have great respect for the elderly and believe in communal mobilisation call Meshike in Vecemwe. The ethos and motto of the Kamwe people in vecemwe is "Dabeghi Nji Denama" which translate to mean: "there is strength in unity." Since 2017, the Kamwe people have been staging their annual Kamwe Cultural Festival named "Tswe Wasinata" in Vecemwe. It is staged annually every first Saturday in April. The venue is Government Secondary School Michika (GSS Michika) which is well located in the city centre. It has always attracted tourists from far and near. The high point of the annual Kamwe cultural festival is the display of "Tuvue" the foremost Kamwe masquerade which was the star display at the 2006 Nigerian National Festival of Arts and Culture in Abuja and caught the fancy of the then President Olusegun Obasanjo.

== Politics ==
His Royal Highness, Alhaji Yahya Abubakar Faruk is the District Head of Michika. He was elected by the 'king makers' on Saturday, 1 January 2025, following the death of Coffor Maude who acted as the district head for 50 years.

== Demographics ==
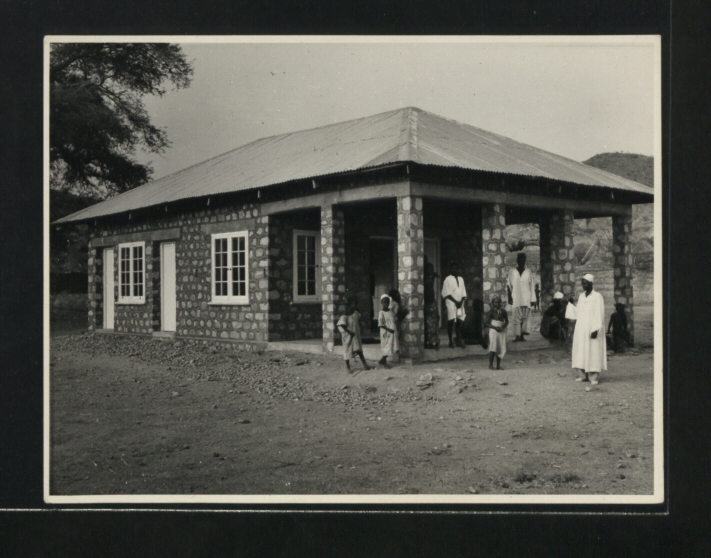
Government Senior Secondary School in Michika

Michika local government is the most populated in Adamawa State. Michika is also a cosmopolitan town: it has branches of many banks, a college of health and technology, a technical college and many secondary schools. The oldest and most popular secondary school in Michika is the Government Senior Secondary School (G.S.S.) Michika. The inhabitants are predominantly Christians constituting about 98% of the population, while the remaining are Muslims and some traditional religion worshipers. There are about 26 chiefdoms and 84 villages around the mountainous ranges. The population of Michika is large; estimates have varied from around 375,000 and 700,000 depending on the census used and its methodology.

== Festivals ==
There are many cultural festivals performed by the Kamwe people in Michika. Foremost amongst them are the Yawale, Wasinata, Ngarba, and the Zhitta dance among other festivals. There are also tourists sites and scenery in Michika such as the Kwandree cold spring water at Dlaka and the Kamale peak at Kamale.

History: History and culture of the Kamwe people has been documented since 1400AD

== Notable people ==
Notable historical leaders of the Kamwe people were Gelmai, the first Kamwe ancestor who left Ethiopia. Kwada Kwakaa the founder of Michika. Michika has produced prominent individuals such as The First Civilian Governor of Adamawa State Abubakar Saleh Michika, Former Governor of Adamawa Boni Haruna, Former Lagos State Governor Mohammed Buba Marwa, Late Dr John Guli, Late Tumba Ra Wandate, Late Umaru Ngiki, Reverend Dr Samuel Dante Dali former President Church of the Brethren in Nigeria, former minister of education of Nigeria Professor Tahir Mamman a senior advocate of Nigeria SAN, and Late Major General John Samuel Zaruwa among others.

The town was seized by the Boko Haram Islamic terrorists in September 2014 but the town was re-captured by the Nigerian military on 29 January 2015.

== Conflicts ==
Former President Goodluck Jonathan announced re-capture of Michika Town from Boko Haram Islamic terrorists on Thursday 29 January 2015; he made the announcement while on a campaign tour of Adamawa State.

== Murder of Rev Lawan Andiki ==
In January 2020, Boko Haram terrorists kidnapped Rev Lawan Andimi, a state chairman of the Christian Association of Nigeria and district secretary of the Church of the Brethren for the Michika area. Andimi's capture gained international attention when a video was released in which he professed his Christian faith. Andimi was executed on 20 January 2020.

== Climate ==
The rainy season in Michika is oppressive and overcast, the dry season is partly cloudy, and it is hot all year. Throughout the year, the temperature normally ranges from 59 °F to 103 °F, with temperatures rarely falling below 54 °F or rising over 108 °F. Michika has a Tropical wet and dry or savanna climate (Classification: Aw) and is located at an elevation of 0 metres/feet above sea level. The yearly temperature in the area is 31.77 °C (89.19 °F), which is 2.31% higher than the national average. Michika gets about 118.97 millimetres (4.684 inches) of rain each year and has 142.31 wet days (38.99% of the time).
