= 2019 Nigerian House of Representatives elections in Adamawa State =

The 2019 Nigerian House of Representatives elections in Adamawa State was held on February 23, 2019, to elect members of the House of Representatives to represent Adamawa State, Nigeria.

== Overview ==
Affiliation	Party		Total
Affiliation	APC	PDP	Total
Before Election	7	1	8
After Election	3	5	8

== Summary ==
District	Incumbent	Party	Elected Rep.	Party
Demsa/Numan/Lamurde	Talatu Yohanna	APC	Kwamoti Bitrus Laori	PDP
Fufore/Song	Sadiq Ibrahim	APC	Mohammed M. Saidu	PDP
Gombi/Hong	Yusuf Yakub	APC	Yusuf Yakub	APC
Guyuk/Shelleng	Philip Ahmad	APC	Gideon Goroki	PDP
Madagali/Michika	Adamu Kamale	PDP	Zakaria Dauda Nyampa	PDP
Maiha/Mubi North/Mubi South	Shuaibu Abdulraman	APC	Ja'Afar Abubaka Magaji	APC
Mayo Belwa/Toungo/Jada/Ganye	Abdulrazak Namdas	APC	Abdulrazak Namdas	APC
Yola North/Yola South/Girei	Abubakar Lawal	APC	Jafaru Suleiman Ribadu	PDP

== Results ==
=== Demsa/Numan/Lamurde ===
A total of 13 candidates registered with the Independent National Electoral Commission to contest in the election. PDP candidate Kwamoti Bitrus Laori won the election, defeating APC Olvadi Bema Madayi and 11 other party candidates. Laori received 68.14% of the votes, while Madayi received 27.96%.

2019 Nigerian House of Representatives election in Adamawa State
Party	Candidate	Votes	%
PDP	Kwamoti Bitrus Laori	69,580	68.14%
APC	Olvadi Bema Madayi	28,546	27.96%
Others		3,982	3.90%
Total votes		102,108	100%
PDP hold			

=== Fufore/Song ===
A total of 10 candidates registered with the Independent National Electoral Commission to contest in the election. PDP candidate Mohammed M. Saidu won the election, defeating APC Sadiq Ibrahim and 8 other party candidates. Saidu received 42.6% of the votes, while Ibrahim received 39.82%.

2019 Nigerian House of Representatives election in Adamawa State
Party	Candidate	Votes	%
PDP	Mohammed M. Saidu	36,769	42.60%
APC	Sadiq Ibrahim	34,379	39.82%
Others		15,171	17.58%
Total votes		86,319	100%
PDP hold			

=== Gombi/Hong ===
A total of 13 candidates registered with the Independent National Electoral Commission to contest in the election. APC candidate Yusuf Yakub won the election, defeating PDP Pukuma James Tartus and 11 other party candidates. Yakub received 39.78% of the votes, while Tartus received 36.50%.

2019 Nigerian House of Representatives election in Adamawa State
Party	Candidate	Votes	%
APC	Yusuf Yakub	30,424	39.78%
PDP	Pukuma James Tartus	27,922	36.50%
Others		18,145	23.72%
Total votes		76,491	100%
APC hold			

=== Guyuk/Shelleng ===
A total of 8 candidates registered with the Independent National Electoral Commission to contest in the election. PDP candidate Gideon Goroki won the election, defeating APC Ahmaou Philip Gutuwa and 6 other party candidates. Goroki received 54.24% of the votes, while Philip received 34.83%.

2019 Nigerian House of Representatives election in Adamawa State
Party	Candidate	Votes	%
PDP	Gideon Goroki	32,688	54.24%
APC	Ahmaou Philip Gutuwa	20,988	34.83%
Others		6,950	10.93%
Total votes		60,266	100%
PDP hold			

=== Madagali/Michika ===
A total of 14 candidates registered with the Independent National Electoral Commission to contest in the election. PDP candidate Zakaria Dauda Nyampa won the election, defeating APC Adamu Usman and 12 other party candidates. Dauda received 58.94% of the votes, while Usman received 28.23%.

2019 Nigerian House of Representatives election in Adamawa State
Party	Candidate	Votes	%
PDP	Zakaria Dauda Nyampa	40,332	58.94%
APC	Adamu Usman	19,317	28.23%
Others		8,782	12.83%
Total votes		68,431	100%
PDP hold			

=== Maiha/Mubi North/Mubi South ===
A total of 7 candidates registered with the Independent National Electoral Commission to contest in the election. APC candidate Ja'Afar Abubakar Magaji won the election, defeating PDP Umar Babangida Maina and 5 other party candidates. Abubakar received 49.84% of the votes, while Babangida received 36.61%.

2019 Nigerian House of Representatives election in Adamawa State
Party	Candidate	Votes	%
APC	Ja'Afar Abubakar Magaji	43,117	49.84%
PDP	Umar Babangida Maina	31,677	36.61%
Others		11,723	13.55%
Total votes		86,517	100%
APC hold			

=== Mayo Belwa/Toungo/Jada/Ganye ===
A total of 9 candidates registered with the Independent National Electoral Commission to contest in the election. APC candidate Abdulrazak Namdas won the election, defeating PDP Kabiru Muktar and 7 other party candidates. Namdas received 48.35% of the votes, while Muktar received 47.62%.

2019 Nigerian House of Representatives election in Adamawa State
Party	Candidate	Votes	%
APC	Abdulrazak Namdas	62,374	48.35%
PDP	Kabiru Muktar	61,436	47.62%
Others		5,195	4.03%
Total votes		129,005	100%
APC hold			

=== Yola North/Yola South/Girei ===
A total of 12 candidates registered with the Independent National Electoral Commission to contest in the election. APC candidate Abdulrauf Abdulkadir Moddibo had most votes, followed by PDP Jafaru Suleiman Ribadu and 10 other party candidates. Moddibo received 49.66% of the votes, while Suleiman received 29.92%. Jafaru Suleiman Ribadu was declared winner after the Supreme Court nullified the election of Abdulkadir Moddibo. It was stated that Mr Modibbo did not qualify to be nominated as a candidate for the APC because he was yet to complete his National Youth Service Corps as he was still in his NYSC service year.

2019 Nigerian House of Representatives election in Adamawa State
Party	Candidate	Votes	%
APC	Abdulrauf Abdulkadir Moddibo	80,453	49.66%
PDP	Jafaru Suleiman Ribadu	48,476	29.92%
Others		33,091	20.42%
Total votes		162,020	100%
PDP hold			
