= Abdulrazak Namdas =

Nigerian politician and journalist

Abdulrazak Saad Namdas (born January 1, 1969) is a Nigerian veteran journalist and politician. Namdas a member of Nigeria Federal House of Representatives represents Jada/Ganye/MayoBelwa/Toungo Federal Constituency of Adamawa State, north east Nigeria. He was the spokesman of House of Representatives in the 8th assembly of the Federal Republic of Nigeria. He previously served as Chief Press Secretary to Governor Boni Haruna of Adamawa State. Namdas was a deputy president of the Pan-African parliament. In 2019, he contested for the speaker of house of representatives of the 9th assembly but stepped down for Femi Gbajabiamila who was endorsed for the position by their party All Progressives Congress, APC.

== Early life and education ==
Namdas was born in Ganye Local Council Area of Adamawa State during the Nigerian civil war, his childhood experience greatly influenced his upbringing, and the seeds of humanitarianism, political activism and internationalism were sown in him.

After graduating with a BSC in Sociology from the Usmanu Danfodiyo University, Sokoto, and then a Post Graduate Diploma in Journalism from the Nigeria Institute of Journalism in 1998.

Namdas served as State Correspondent for the Nigerian Daily Times. This led to his appointment as Chief Press Secretary to Governor Boni Haruna of Adamawa State.

== Political career ==
Namdas became a partisan politician after he was appointed Director General of Atiku Support Group – an influential political campaign platform that was founded by Atiku Abubakar, a former Vice President of Nigeria who served alongside President Olusengun Obasanjo between 1999 and 2007.

=== Election to House of Representatives ===
Namdas a member of All Progressives Congress was elected to the Nigeria Federal House of Representatives in 2015. He represents Jada/Ganye/Mayo Belwa/Toungo Federal Constituency of Adamawa State. After the inauguration of the 8th assembly on June 6, 2015 he was appointed as chairman of house committee on Media and Public Affairs. The chairmanship of this committee meant that he is the spokesman of the house.

In 2019 he was elected to a second term in the house.

=== Race for speaker ===
After winning election to a second term in the house in 2019, Namdas started a campaign for the speaker of the Federal House of Representatives of the 9th assembly. His major campaign issues were rebranding of the image of the national assembly which was at the time under severe criticism for various reasons by Nigerians and the second issue was to give the youths a key political position.

His campaign received popular support but several factors including zoning of speakership position to the south west of Nigeria and the issue of ranking (seniority) worked against him. He dropped his ambition for the APC nominated candidate Femi Gbajabiamila from the south of the country.
