= Bindow Jibrilla =

Nigerian politician (born 15 April 1965)

Bindo Jibrilla

Governor of Adamawa State
- In office 29 May 2015 – 29 May 2019
- Deputy: Martins Babale
- Preceded by: Bala James Ngilari
- Succeeded by: Ahmadu Umaru Fintiri

Senator for Adamawa North
- In office 6 June 2011 – 29 May 2015
- Preceded by: Mohammed Mana
- Succeeded by: Binta Masi Garba

Personal details
- Born: 15 April 1965 (age 61) Adamawa State, Nigeria
- Party: All Progressive Congress
- Other political affiliations: Peoples Democratic Party
- Occupation: Politician; businessman

Mohammed Umaru Jibrilla (born 15 April 1965), known as Bindow Jibrilla, is a Nigerian businessman and politician who served as governor of Adamawa State from 2015 to 2019. He previously served as the senator representing Adamawa North senatorial district from 2011 to 2015.

Bindow was elected governor of Adamawa State after defeating Nuhu Ribadu and Markus Gundiri in the April 2015 Adamawa State gubernatorial election. In 2019, he sought re-election for a second term in office but was defeated by opposition People's Democratic Party's candidate, Ahmadu Umaru Fintiri.

== PDP primary ==
Bindo Umaru Jibrilla is described as a business tycoon, new to politics. He is an industrialist who has established three companies in Mubi, employing about four hundred people, and is a vibrant speaker. He was reportedly called upon by several youth organisations to challenge Mana, who was said to have neglected his senate district. He is known for his philanthropy and for creating jobs, and as the youngest contender would have an advantage with the youth vote.

In the January 2011 PDP primaries for the Adamawa North Senatorial race, Jibrilla Bindo got 626 votes, Mohammed Mana was second with 474 votes, Zira Maigadi secured 162 votes, while Terry Vahyla got 21. Another incumbent Senator, Grace Bent of Adamawa South, was also defeated. On 7 February 2011, well after the deadline for the parties to change their candidate lists had passed, the Independent National Electoral Commission (INEC) published a list showing Jibrilla as PDP candidate for Adamawa not North.

== Appeals ==
Mana and Bent independently filed appeals against the primary results. Newspapers reported that there would be a re-run of the primaries, which the (INEC) said it would not recognise. The PDP state chairman, Alhaji Minjinyawa Kugama, also denied knowledge of the re-run, saying he had heard nothing about it from the party leadership, and saying that the primary election had been free and fair.

On 15 March 2011 both Governor Murtala Nyako and the state chairman of the party, Mijinyawa Umaru Kugama, said that they would not support Mana and Bent in their appeals. Later in March 2011 a Federal High Court in Abuja dismissed the appeal as lacking in merit. Mana appealed this ruling. Justice Kafarati affirmed the election of Jibrilla as PDP Candidate for Adamawa North Senatorial district. A PDP leader in the state, Malam Rabiu Rara, advised the two to obey the court orders.

== April election ==
In the 9 April 2011 election, Jibrilla polled 75,112 votes, while the runner-up Boni Haruna of the Action Congress of Nigeria (ACN), a former governor of the state, polled 70,890. This result was confirmed by the Independent National Electoral Commission (INEC) as of 16 April.

== See also ==
- List of governors of Adamawa State
