= Mayo-Belwa =

- City and LGA and town
- Location within Nigeria
- Coordinates: 9°03′N 12°03′E
- Country: Nigeria
- State: Adamawa State

Area
  - Total: 2,368 km^{2} (914 sq mi)

Population (2022)
  - Total: 235,600
  - Density: 99.49/km^{2} (257.7/sq mi)
- Time zone: UTC+1 (WAT)

Mayo-Belwa, is a city and Local Government Area in central Adamawa State, Nigeria. It had an estimated population of about 204,200 people as of 2016. It shares boundary with Taraba State to the west.

== Demography ==
In a 2023 demographic survey of Internally displaced persons (IDPs), the area was found to be majorly Fulfulde speaking. The most predominant languages (spoken at homes and places of primary residence) present in the local government area were; Fulfulde, specifically Eastern or Adamawa Fulfulde – 54.7%, Hausa – 13.3%, Longuda – 7.0%, Yendang – 4.2%, Jukun – 3.5%, Chamba Donga – 3.4%, Shuwa Arabic – 3.3%, Mumuye – 2.1%, Lamang – 1.4%, Bachama/Bwatiye – 1.4%, Kamwe – 1.3%, and six other languages spoken by populations under 1% each. This data was not obtained from a nationally co-ordinated population headcount. The last time Nigeria included ethnic and linguistic data in its enumeration parameters was in the national census of 1963.

== History ==
The settlement was founded by the Bata of the Mayo Ine valley during their war with Lamido Lawal and was called Gabalwa. Lawal's forces gained control of the settlement shortly after its establishment, resulting in a change to its current name, Mayo-Belwa. In response to these changes, the former inhabitants of the region chose to relocate. Their movement began with a shift to Kikan, followed by a move to Nwamo under the leadership of a new chief named Dunama. Eventually, they found their settlement in Deniyobusa, also referred to as Demsa-Mosu.

On the evening of 3 August 1974, a meteorite weighing about 5 kg fell in the town. Some herdsmen saw it streaking across the sky, accompanied by loud sounds heard up to 25 kilometres (16 miles) from the impact site. The meteorite was then sent to the Geological Survey of Nigeria for analysis and later loaned to the British Museum (Natural History) for further study.

== Climate ==
The rainy season in Mayo-Belwa is oppressive and overcast, the dry season is partly cloudy, and it is hot all year. Throughout the year, the temperature normally ranges from 16 °C (61 °F) to 37 °C (99 °F), with temperatures rarely falling below 13 °C (55 °F) or rising above 41 °C (105 °F). Mayo Belwa has a Tropical wet and dry or savanna climate (Classification: Aw) and is located at an elevation of no metres/feet above sea level. The yearly temperature in the district is 30.37 °C (86.67 °F), which is 0.91% higher than the national average. Mayo Belwa gets about 113.75 millimetres (4.48 inches) of rain every year and has 136.05 wet days (37.27% of the time).
