= James Shaibu Barka =

Nigerian politician

Acting Governor of Adamawa State
- In office 26 February 2008 – 29 April 2008
- Preceded by: Murtala Nyako
- Succeeded by: Murtala Nyako

Personal details
- Born: 1961 (age 64–65)

James Shaibu Barka (born 1961) was elected a member of the Adamawa State, Nigeria House of Assembly, and was appointed Speaker. When Adamawa State Governor Murtala Nyako's election was nullified in February 2008, Barka became Acting Governor, handing back to Nyako after he had been reelected on 29 April 2008.

== Early life ==
James Shaibu Barka was born on 10 May 1961 in what is now Adamawa State, Nigeria.

=== Qualifications ===
Barka holds a Bachelor of Science degree in Education, obtained from a Nigerian institution.

== Political career ==
Barka was elected to the Adamawa Assembly for the Hong constituency. In July 2003, as Majority Leader of the Assembly, he successfully moved a motion to dissolve the State Civil Service Commission, State Independent Electoral Commission, and the Judicial Service Commission, replacing them with management committees with members nominated by the governor.

After the Election Petition Appeal Tribunal upheld the nullification of governor Nyako's election, Barka was sworn in as Acting Governor on 26 February 2008. Barka immediately sacked all of Nyako's appointees, including commissioners, committee chairmen, area administrators, special advisers, and assistants. Barka handed back power to Nyako on 29 April 2008 after the former governor had won the re-run election.

In March 2010, the House of Assembly passed a law to award Barka a lifetime pension for his service as governor. The law was disputed as being unconstitutional. In April 2010, he was being considered a possible candidate for governor in the April 2011 elections.
