= Murtala Nyako =

Nigerian politician and military officer (born 1942)

Vice Admiral Murtala Nyako GCON CFR

Governor of Adamawa State
- In office 29 April 2008 – 15 July 2014
- Deputy: Bala James Ngilari
- Preceded by: James Shaibu Barka (acting)
- Succeeded by: Umaru Fintiri (acting)
- In office 29 May 2007 – 26 February 2008
- Deputy: Bala James Ngilari
- Preceded by: Boni Haruna
- Succeeded by: James Shaibu Barka (acting)

Chief of Naval Staff
- In office January 1990 – February 1992
- Preceded by: Vice Adm. Patrick Koshoni
- Succeeded by: Vice Adm. Dan Preston Omosola

Governor of Niger State
- In office February 1976 – December 1977
- Preceded by: Office established
- Succeeded by: Okoh Ebitu Ukiwe

Personal details
- Born: Murtala Hamman-Yero Nyako; 27 August 1942 (age 84) Mayo-Belwa, British Cameroon (now in Adamawa State, Nigeria)
- Party: All Progressive Congress
- Other political affiliations: Peoples Democratic Party
- Spouse: Binta Nyako
- Education: Britannia Royal Naval College
- Occupation: Politician; military officer
- Website: Personal website

Military service
- Allegiance: Nigeria
- Branch/service: Nigerian Navy
- Years of service: 1963–1993
- Rank: Vice Admiral

Murtala Hamman-Yero Nyako, GCON CFR (born 27 August 1942) is a Nigerian politician and retired military officer who served as governor of Adamawa State from 2007 to 2008, and from 2008 to 2014. He previously served as military governor of Niger State from its creation in 1976 to 1977. He was a former Chief of the Naval Staff from 1990 to 1992.

== Early life ==
Murtala Hamman-Yero Nyako was born at Mayo-Belwa, Adamawa State on 27 August 1943. His father, Alhaji Hamman-Yero, was a notable merchant and produce buying agent, whose mercantile activities was directly responsible for the establishment of John Holts and Sons Ltd centre at Mayo-Belwa. His mother, Hajiya Maryam Daso, was a housewife who was keen on Islamic studies and herbal medicine.

He started his western education at Mayo-Belwa Elementary School in January 1952, proceeded to Yola Middle School in January 1955 and commenced his secondary school education in the same school in January 1958. He was noted whilst there for his academic achievements and sporting prowess.

== Naval Career Service ==
Nyako joined the Royal Nigerian Navy in June 1963 as an officer cadet, commenced his officer training at the Britannia Royal Naval College, Dartmouth, England in September 1963, was commissioned as a Sub-Lieutenant in September 1965 and completed his initial naval training in September 1965.

Nyako returned to Nigeria in October 1966 to serve in the Nigerian Navy until September 1993. During that period, he held a number of on-board and shore appointments. He was at one time a Commanding Officer of a Patrol craft, a Landing craft and the first missile carrying ship of the Nigerian Navy. In February 1976, General Murtala Muhammed appointed Nyako governor of the newly formed Niger State, which had been split out from Sokoto State. He served in this post until December 1977. Later he became the Chief of Naval Operations at the Naval Headquarters, the Flag Officer Commanding the Western Naval Command and the Flag Officer Commanding the Naval Training Command from where he was appointed the Chief of Naval Staff in January 1990. Two years later, he was appointed the Deputy Chief of Defence Staff and retired from the Service in September 1993 with the rank of Vice Admiral.

== Post Naval Career and Agricultural Activities ==
Nyako was born a cattle owner as his mother had been allocated some cows for her offspring before he was born. He was, therefore, most involved with cattle rearing and later general agricultural development while he was in the Naval Service. The main issue as he understood it was improving substantially the productivity of Nigeria's agricultural units and the quality of their products. He commenced a sustainable cross-breeding programme of his local cattle with exotic superior sires in 1990 with very satisfactory results. He also got involved in the production of horticultural crops, and his first commercial export of musk melons to Europe using chartered aircraft took place in January 1990. Exotic mangoes from his mango orchard of 50,000 trees were first exported to Europe in 1993. He is also presently involved in the modern production of dates, passionfruit, banana, pasture development, breeding of goats and fish farming.

Nyako is the President of the Horticultural Crops Growers Association of Nigeria, the Practicing Farmers Association of Nigeria and the Apex Farmers Association of Nigeria. He is a patron of numerous farmers' commodity associations in the country. Admiral is a successful integrated farmer of international repute. He is sole owner of one of the largest dairy farm in the country, Sebore (EPZ) Farms. In addition, Nyako owns the largest mango farm in the country leading to him being known as Baba Mai Mangoro (BMM).

== Political career and impeachment ==
Nyako entered politics in 2006. He was elected Governor of Adamawa State in April 2007. In February 2008 the Election Petition Appeal Tribunal annulled his election, alleging electoral malpractices. The House Speaker James Barka was sworn in as Acting Governor on 26 February 2008.

A fresh election was run, and Nyako was reelected with a landslide victory taking all 21 Local Government Areas, resuming office on 29 April 2008. Soon after, the House initiated moves to impeach Nyako, but was dissuaded after the personal intervention of President Umaru Yar'Adua. The relationship improved, and in March 2010 the Adamawa State House of Assembly passed a vote of confidence in Governor Nyako, describing him as a "messiah" to the people of the state. In 2012 after the Governor's first tenure, he ran for a second term in the 2012 Adamawa State gubernatorial election and was once again re-elected.

On 15 July 2014, the governor was impeached as the state House of Assembly deliberated on the report of an investigative panel that probed allegations of financial misconduct against him. The report found the governor guilty of all the 16 allegations of gross misconduct leveled against him by the House.

On 11 February 2016 the Federal Court of Appeal declared the impeachment as illegal, null and void and ordered that all his entitlements accrued from the date of impeachment be paid to him. The judgment was upheld on 16 December 2016 by the Supreme Court of Nigeria but declined to reinstate him.

== Corruption allegations and trial ==
Starting in 2015, the Economic and Financial Crimes Commission accused Nyako and his son, Abdul-Aziz Nyako along with several other defendants, of a 37-count charge of criminal conspiracy, theft, abuse of office, and money laundering totaling over ₦29 million. The trial began on 7 July 2015 with the EFCC closing its case four years later on 3 November 2019, having called 21 witnesses; the defense then filed a no case to answer submission. Judge Okon Abang of the Abuja Division of the Federal High Court dismissed the submission in July 2021 before ordering the defense to present its case in October of the same year.

== Accolades ==
Nyako has been a recipient of an honorary Doctorate Degree of Agriculture from the Federal University of Agriculture, Abeokuta; University of Technology Minna, (2008); University of Technology, Yola (2009) and the National Awards of Commander of Federal Republic (CFR) in 1993, Grand Commander of the Niger (GCON) in 1999 and another Commander of the Federal Republic (CFR) in 2002.

== Personal life ==
Nyako is married to Honourable Justice Binta Nyako, who was elected president of the International Association of Women Judges in 2023. She is one of the longest serving judges of the Federal High Court of Nigeria. She served as the chief judge of Bauchi State from 2014 to 2017, becoming the first woman to hold this position in the state and the first woman to lead a high court bench in Nigeria.
