= Hong, Nigeria =

Hong
- LGA and town
- Interactive map of Hong
- Location within Nigeria
- Coordinates: 10°13′54″N 12°55′49″E
- Country: Nigeria
- State: Adamawa State

Area
  - Total: 2,588 km^{2} (999 sq mi)

Population (2022)
  - Total: 260,900
  - Density: 100.8/km^{2} (261.1/sq mi)
- Time zone: UTC+1 (WAT)

Hong is a town and a Local Government Area in Adamawa State, Nigeria. Hong is the capital city of the Holba (Kilba) ethnic group with some other ethnic group and tribes such as the Marghi, Kamwe and Fulani.

== Demography ==
In a 2022 demographic survey of Internally displaced persons (IDPs), the area was found to be dominantly Kilba (Holba). The most commonly reported languages (spoken at homes and places of primary residence) present in the local government area were; Kilba/South Marghi – 85.3%, Kamwe – 5.5%, Hausa – 3.4%, Fulfulde, specifically Eastern or Adamawa Fulfulde – 2.8%, Yoruba – 1.2%, Marghi – 1.2% and English – 0.5%. This data was not obtained from a nationally co-ordinated population headcount. The last time Nigeria included ethnic and linguistic data in its enumeration parameters was in the national census of 1963.

== Climate ==
In Hong, the wet season is oppressive and overcast, the dry season is partly cloudy, and it is hot year round. Over the course of the year, the temperature typically varies from 15 °C (59 °F) to 38 °C (101 °F) and is rarely below 12 °C (54 °F) or above 42 °C (107 °F).

== Government and infrastructure ==
The local government administrative headquarters is located within Hong.

The LGA falls under Adamawa Central Senatorial District and Gombi/Hong Federal Constituency. It has 12 political wards that are subdivided into two State Constituencies, with each having six wards. Hong Constituency comprises Bangshika ward, Daksiri ward, Hong ward, Husherizum ward, Shangui ward and Thilbang ward. Uba/Gaya Constituency comprises Garaha ward, Gaya ward, Hildi ward, Kwarhi ward, Mayo-lope ward and Uba ward.

=== Wards in Hong LGA ===
There are 12 wards in Hong LGA. The wards are as follows:

- Bangshika Ward
- Daksiri Ward
- Garaha Ward
- Gaya Ward
- Hildi Ward
- Hong Ward
- Husherizum Ward
- Kwarhi Ward
- Mayo-Lope Ward
- Shangui Ward
- Thilbang Ward
- Uba Ward

== Communities ==
Districts in the area include Dugwaba, Gaya, Hildi, Hong, Kulinyi, Pella, Uba, Mugwahi, Mayolope/Gashala, Muffa, Yadul, Uding, Hyema and Shangui.

== Notable people ==
- Barr. Boss Gida Mustapha Former Secretary to the Government of the Federation
- Rt. Hon. James Barka, former acting governor, Adamawa State
- Prof. Salihu Mustafa former VC FUTY
