= Madagali =

- LGA and town
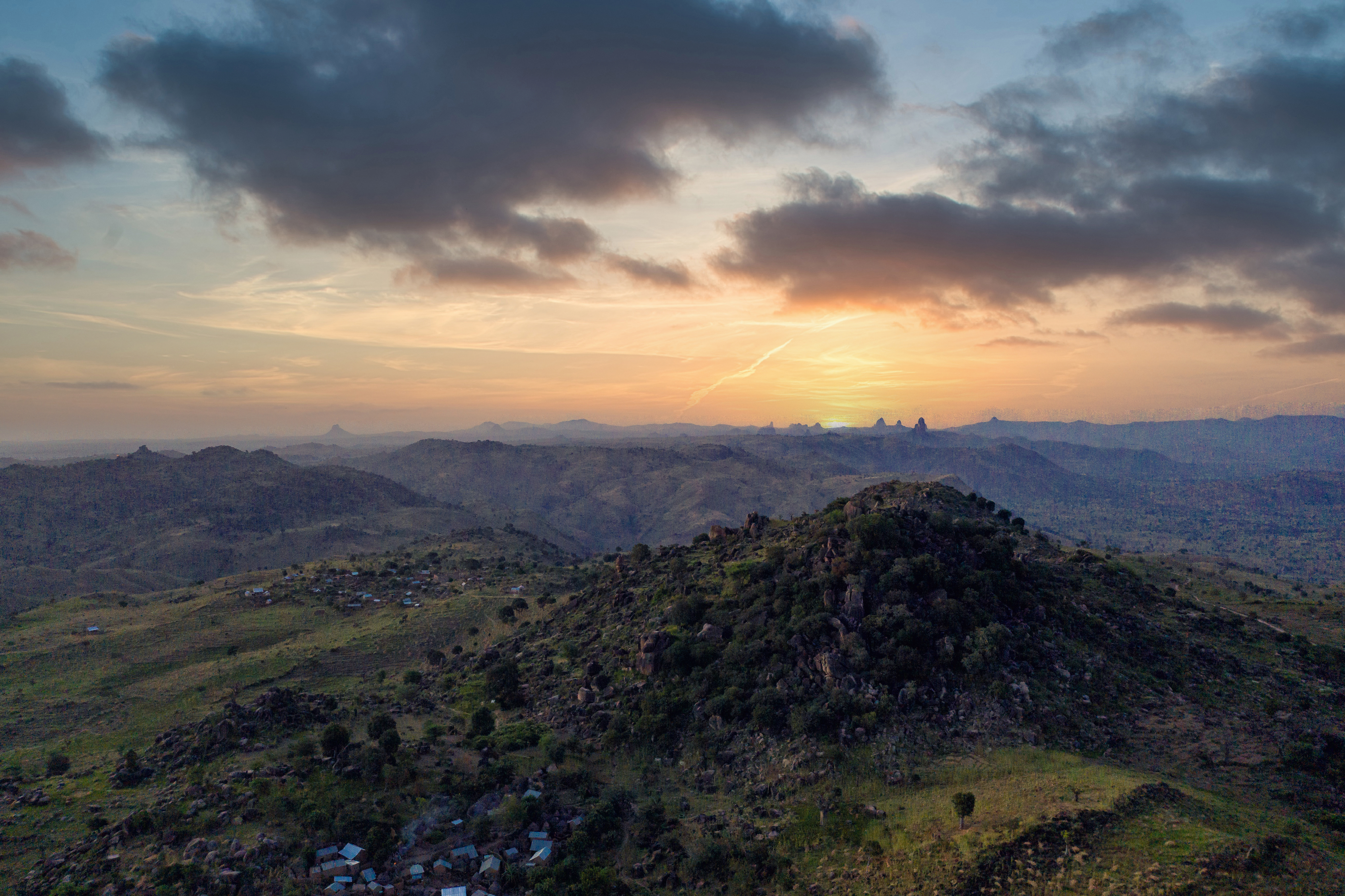
- The Sukur UNESCO World Heritage Site located in Madagali
- Interactive map of Madagali
- Location within Nigeria
- Coordinates: 10°53′10″N 13°37′47″E
- Country: Nigeria
- State: Adamawa State

Area
  - Total: 957.4 km^{2} (369.7 sq mi)

Population (2022)
  - Total: 208,400
  - Density: 217.7/km^{2} (563.8/sq mi)
- Time zone: UTC+1 (WAT)

Madagali or Madagli is a town and local government area in Adamawa State, Nigeria, adjacent to the border with Cameroon.

== History ==
The name comes from a spear ('gali') of a Marghi named Madu.

The Local Government Area was created in 1991 when Taraba State was created out of Gongola state. It borders Michika to the south, Askira uba to the west, Gwoza local government area to the north and the Republic of Cameroon to the east.

== Demography ==
=== Languages ===
In a 2023 demographic survey of Internally displaced persons (IDPs), the most commonly reported languages (spoken at homes and places of primary residence) present in the local government area were; Fulfulde, specifically Eastern or Adamawa Fulfulde – 43.1%, Hausa – 43.0 and Marghi – 13.9%. This data was not obtained from a nationally co-ordinated population headcount. The last time Nigeria included ethnic and linguistic data in its enumeration parameters was in the national census of 1963.

=== Ethnic groups ===
The ethnic groups in Madagali include; Fulbe, Marghi, Mafa, Sukur, Hdi (Tur), Vemgo, Ngoshe and Wagga.

== Villages ==
The major villages in Madagali are Gulak, Shuwa and madagali. Madagali is richly blessed with fertile land which makes the people to heavily engage in Agricultural activities.

== Boko Haram Insurgency ==
In September 2012, a Boko Haram commander was killed in Madgali by Nigerian government forces, and 156 arrests were made as a part of "Operation Restore sanity."

The town was seized by Boko Haram in August 2014. In September 2014, residents of Madagali, Gulak, and Michika fled to mountainous areas and Mubi town, in the wake of a failed attempt by government troops to re-take the town from the insurgents.

== Climate ==
The rainy season in Madagali is oppressively humid and cloudy, whereas the dry season is stiflingly hot and partially cloudy. The average annual temperature ranges from 14 °C (58 °F) to 39 °C (103 °F), with lows and highs of 12 °C (53 °F) and 42 °C (108 °F) being extremely rare.
