= Song, Nigeria =

Song
- LGA and town
- Map of Adamawa State highlighting Song
- Interactive map of Song
- Location within Nigeria
- Coordinates: 9°49′28″N 12°37′30″E
- Country: Nigeria
- State: Adamawa State

Population
  - Total: 260,900
- Time zone: UTC+1 (WAT)

Song is a town and Local Government Area in Adamawa State, Nigeria is a town and also a local government area in the state with the area council consisting districts of Song, Dumme, Dirma, Kilange, Funa, Gudu, Mboi, Kilange, Hirna, Gari, Waje, Suktu, Zumo, Waltandi and Ditera.

== Population ==
The estimated population of Song is 260,900.

== Climate and Geography ==
In Song, the dry season is oppressively hot and partly cloudy, and the wet season is oppressively hot and overcast. Throughout the year, the average temperature ranges from 16 to 39 degrees Celsius (61 to 103 degrees Fahrenheit), rarely falling below 13 °C (56 °F) or rising over 42 °C (108 °F).

Song has an average temperature of 31 °C (88 °F). The LGA has some slopes with the region having a typical breeze speed of 11 km/h (6.8 mph). The LGA likewise has a couple of streams and waterways moving through its domain.
