= Adamawa State House of Assembly =

Legislative arm of the government of Adamawa State of Nigeria

- Unicameral Legislature
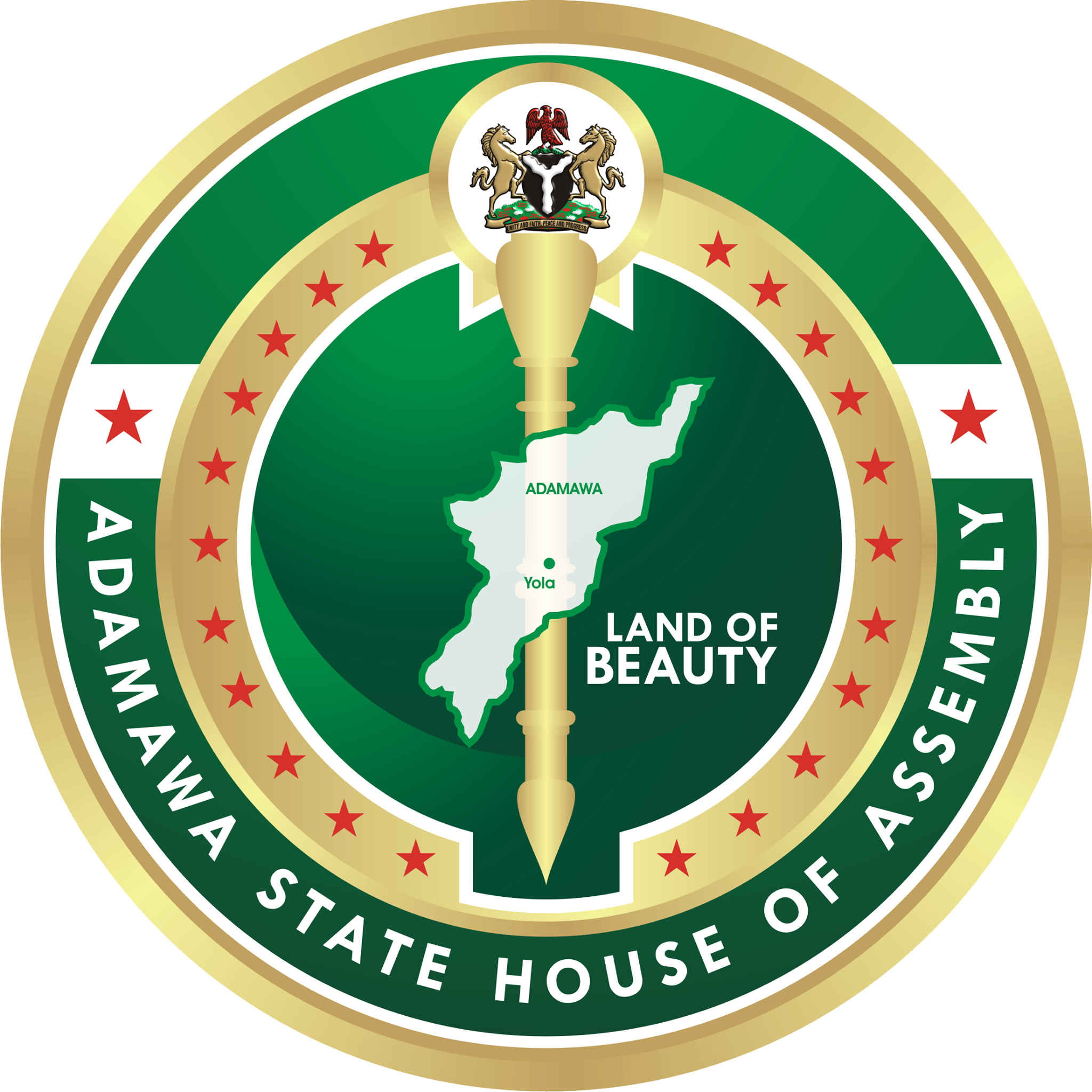

Type
- Term limits: 4 terms (8 years total)
- Established: 29 May 1999

Leadership
- Speaker: Wesley Bathiya, PDP
- Deputy Speaker: Mohammed Buba Jijiwa

Structure
- Seats: 25
- Political groups: Majority: PDP (13); Minority: APC (11)

Elections
- Last election: 2023

Meeting place
- House of Assembly Complex in Jimeta

Website
- https://adspc.ad.gov.ng/adamawa-state-house-of-assembly-legisture/

Constitution
- Nigerian Constitution

The Adamawa State House of Assembly is the legislative arm of the government of Adamawa State of Nigeria. It is a unicameral legislature with 25 members elected from the 21 local government areas (State Constituencies). Local government areas with considerable larger population are delineated into two constituencies to give equal representation. This makes the number of legislators in the Adamawa State House of Assembly 25.

The fundamental functions of the Assembly are to enact new laws, amend or repeal existing laws and oversight of the executive. Members of the assembly are elected for a term of four years concurrent with federal legislators (Senate and House of Representatives). The state assembly convenes three times a week (Tuesdays, Wednesdays and Thursdays) in the assembly complex within the state capital, Yola.

The current speaker of the 8th Adamawa State House of Assembly is Wesley Bathiya of the People's Democratic Party (PDP) is the majority party with 13 members while All Progressives Congress has 11 seats African Democratic Congress has 1 putting them in the minority position.
