= Nigerian National Assembly delegation from Adamawa =

Adamawa's delegation in Nigeria's National Assembly

The Nigerian National Assembly delegation from Adamawa comprises three Senators representing Adamawa North, Adamawa Central, and Adamawa South, and eight Representatives representing Jada/Ganye/Mayo-Belwa/Toungo, Guyuk/Shelleng, Hong/Gombi, Mubi N/Mu S/Maiha, Fufore/Song, Yola North/Yoal South/Girei, Demsa/Numan/Lamurde, and Madagali/Michika.

== Fourth Republic ==
=== The 10th Assembly (2023 till date) ===
OFFICE	NAME	PARTY	CONSTITUENCY	TERM
Senator	Amos Yohanna	PDP	Adamawa North	2023–till date
Senator	Abbas Aminu Iya	PDP	Adamawa Central	2023–till date
Senator	Binos Dauda Yaroe	PDP	Adamawa South	2023–till date
Representative	Bassi Mohammed Inuwa	PDP	Jada/Ganye/Mayo Belwa/Toungo	2023–till date
Representative	Thimnu Kobis Ari	PDP	Guyuk/Shelleng	2023–till date
Representative	Barka James Shuiabu	PDP	Hong/Gombi	2023–till date
Representative	Rufa'i Jingi	PDP	Mubi N/Mubi S/Maiha	2023–till date
Representative	Aliyu Wakili Boya	APC	Fufore/Song	2023–till date
Representative	Zakaria Dauda Nyampa	PDP	Michika/Madagali	2023–till date
Representative	Kwamoti Bitrus Laori	PDP	Demsa/Numan/Lamurde	2023–till date
Representative	Abubakar Baba Zango	APC	Yola North/Yola South/Girei	2023–till date

=== The 9th Assembly (2019–2023) ===
OFFICE	NAME	PARTY	CONSTITUENCY	TERM
Senator	Ishaku Elisha Abbo	PDP	Adamawa North	2019–2023
Senator	Aishatu Dahiru Ahmed	APC	Adamawa Central	2019–2023
Senator	Binos Dauda Yaroe	PDP	Adamawa South	2019–2023
Representative	Abdulrazak Namdas	PDP	Jada/Ganye/Mayo Belwa/Toungo	2019–2023
Representative	Gibeon Goroki Miskaru	PDP	Guyuk/Shelleng	2019–2023
Representative	Yusuf Buba	APC	Hong/Gombi	2019–2023
Representative	Jaafar Abubakar Magaji	APC	Mubi N/Mubi S/Maiha	2019–2023
Representative	Mustafa Muhammed Saidu	PDP	Fufore/Song	2019–2023
Representative	Zakaria Dauda Nyampa	PDP	Michika/Madagali	2019–2023
Representative	Kwamoti Bitrus Laori	PDP	Demsa/Numan/Lamurde	2019–2023
Representative	Jafaru Suleiman Ribadu	PDP	Yola North/Yola South/Girei	2019–2023

=== The 8th Assembly (2015–2019) ===
OFFICE	NAME	PARTY	CONSTITUENCY	TERM
Senator	Binta Garba	APC	Adamawa North	2015–2019
Senator	Abdul-Aziz Nyako	APC	Adamawa Central	2015–2019
Senator	Ahmad Abubakar	APC	Adamawa South	2015–2019
Representative	Abdulrazak Namdas	APC	Jada/Ganye/Mayo Belwa/Toungo	2015–2019
Representative	Philip Ahmad	APC	Guyuk/Shelleng	2015–2019
Representative	Yusuf Buba	APC	Hong/Gombi	2015–2019
Representative	Shuaibu Abdulrahman	APC	Mubi N/Mu S/Maiha	2015–2019
Representative	Sadiq Ibrahim	APC	Fufore/Song	2015–2019
Representative	Adamu Kamale	PDP	Michika/Madagali	2015–2019
Representative	Talatu Yohanna	APC	Demsa/Numan/Lamurde	2015–2019
Representative	Abubakar Lawal	APC	Yola North/Yola South/Girei	2015–2019

=== The 7th Assembly (2011–2015) ===
OFFICE	NAME	PARTY	CONSTITUENCY	TERM
Senator	Bindo Jibrilla	PDP	Adamawa North	2011–2015
Senator	Bello Mohammed Tukur	PDP	Adamawa Central	2011–2015
Senator	Barata Ahmed Hassan	PDP	Adamawa South	2011–2015
Representative	Nwangubi Fons	PDP	Jada/Ganye/Mayo Belwa/Toungo	2011–2015
Representative	Nathaniel Kauda	PDP	Guyuk/Shelleng	2011–2015
Representative	Haske Hananiya Francis	APC	Hong/Gombi	2011–2015
Representative	Wambai Mahmud	PDP	Mubi N/Mu S/Maiha	2011–2015
Representative	Aminu Hamman-Tukur Ribadu	PDP	Fufore/Song	2011–2015
Representative	Ganawa Kwaga	PDP	Michika/Madagali	2011–2015
Representative	Anthony Madwate	PDP	Demsa/Numan/Lamurde	2011–2015
Representative	Aishatu Dahiru Ahmed	PDP	Yola North/Yola South/Girei	2011–2015

=== The 6th Assembly (2007–2011) ===
OFFICE	NAME	PARTY	CONSTITUENCY	TERM
Senator	Mohammed Mana	PDP	Adamawa North	2007–2011
Senator	Jibril Aminu	PDP	Adamawa Central	2007–2011
Senator	Grace Folashade Bent	PDP	Adamawa South	2007–2011
Representative	Martins Babale	AC	Jada/Ganye/Mayo Belwa/Toungo	2007–2011
Representative	Jim Kwawo Audu	AC	Guyuk/Shelleng	2007–2011
Representative	Emmanuel Bello	APP	Hong/Gombi	2007–2011
Representative	Njida Ahmed Gella	PDP	Mubi North/Mubi South/Maiha	2007–2011
Representative	Aminu Hamman Tukur Ribadu	PDP	Fufore/Song	2007–2011
Representative	Binta Masi Garba	PDP	Michika/Madagali	2007–2011
Representative	Anthony Madwate	PDP	Demsa/Numan/Lamurde	2007–2011
Representative	Sa 'ad M C Tahir	PDP	Yola North/Yola South/Girei	2007–2011

=== The 5th Assembly (2003–2007) ===
OFFICE	NAME	PARTY	CONSTITUENCY	TERM
Senator	Iya Abubakar	PDP	Adamawa North	2003–2007
Senator	Jibril Aminu	PDP	Adamawa Central	2003–2007
Senator	Jonathan Silas Zwingina	PDP	Adamawa South	2003–2007
Representative	Martins Babale	PDP	Jada/Ganye/Mayo Belwa/Toungo	2003–2007
Representative	Barata Ahmed Hassan	PDP	Guyuk/Shelleng	2003–2007
Representative	Albert Atiwurcha	PDP	Hong/Gombi	2003–2007
Representative	Njida Ahmed Gella	PDP	Mubi North/Mubi South/Maiha	2003–2007
Representative	Nuhu Borbo Gurin	PDP	Fufore/Song	2003–2007
Representative	Bala Ngilare	PDP	Michika/Madagali	2003–2007
Representative	Anthony Madwate	PDP	Demsa/Numan/Lamurde	2003–2007
Representative	Bornoma Dahiru	ANPP	Yola North/Yola South/Girei	2003–2007

=== The 4th Assembly (1999–2003) ===
OFFICE	NAME	PARTY	CONSTITUENCY	TERM
Senator	Iya Abubakar	PDP	Adamawa North	1999–2003
Senator	Abubakar Halilu Girei	PDP	Adamawa Central	1999–2003
Senator	Jonathan Silas Zwingina	PDP	Adamawa South	1999–2003
Representative	Martins Babale	PDP	Jada/Ganye/Mayo Belwa/Toungo	1999–2003
Representative	Barata Ahmed Hassan	PDP	Guyuk/Shelleng	1999–2003
Representative	Maxwell Buluma	APP	Hong/Gombi	1999–2003
Representative	Njida Ahmed Gella	PDP	Mubi North/Mubi South/Maiha	1999–2003
Representative	Nuhu Borbo Gurin	PDP	Fufore/Song	1999–2003
Representative	Ishaku Terei Kwaghe	PDP	Michika/Madagali	1999–2003
Representative	Betu Mamuno	PDP	Demsa/Numan/Lamurde	1999–2003
Representative	Awwal D Tukur	PDP	Yola North/Yola South/Girei	1999–2003

== Third Republic ==
=== The 3rd Assembly (1992–1993) ===
OFFICE	NAME	PARTY	CONSTITUENCY	TERM
Senator	Paul Wampana	NRC	Adamawa North	1992–1993
Senator	Hamman Bello Mohammed	NRC	Adamawa Central	1992–1993
Senator	Manasa T B Daniel	NRC	Adamawa South	1992–1993
Representative	Abubakar Umar Al'uma	NRC	Yola	1992–1993
Representative	Ahmed Hassan Barata	NRC	Shelleng	1992–1993
Representative	Adiel Edmund Olse	NRC	Numan	1992–1993
Representative	Godfrey Ayuba Yoila	SDP	Demsa	1992–1993
Representative	Michael Alaramu Angilda	NRC	Madagali	1992–1993
Representative	Abdulrahman Abubakar Bobbu	NRC	Gombi	1992–1993
Representative	Musa Janro	NRC	Mubi	1992–1993
Representative	Nashon Gubi Nabi	NRC	Mayo Belwa	1992–1993
Representative	Munun G Mapundi	NRC	Jada	1992–1993
Representative	Aliyu Audu Mustapha	NRC	Macha	1992–1993
Representative	Ethan Lawan Dangtibiya	NRC	Song	1992–1993
Representative	Umaru Hamman Tukur	NRC	Fufore	1992–1993
Representative	Abdulmumini Umar	NRC	Ganye	1992–1993
Representative	Godwin Puldu	NRC	Guyuk	1992–1993
Representative	Ethan Yusuf	SDP	Hong	1992–1993
