= Adamawa South senatorial district =

Senatorial district in Nigeria

Adamawa South senatorial district

The Adamawa South senatorial district in Adamawa State, Nigeria covers the local government areas of Demsa, Ganye, Guyuk, Jada, Lamurde, Mayo-Belwa, Numan, Shelleng, and Toungo.

The senator currently representing the district is Binos Dauda Yaroe of the Peoples Democratic Party who was elected in 2023.

== List of members representing the district ==
Political party: NRC APC PDP

| Member | Party | Years | Assembly | Electoral history |
|---|---|---|---|---|
District created December 5, 1992
| Manasa T B Daniel | | December 5, 1992 – November 17, 1993 | 3rd | Elected in 1992 Third Republic dissolved |
| Jonathan Zwingina | | June 3, 1999 – June 5, 2007 | 4th, 5th | Elected in 1999 Re-elected in 2003 Retired. |
| Grace Bent | | June 5, 2007 – June 6, 2011 | 6th | Elected in 2007 Lost re-election |
| Ahmed Barata | | June 6, 2011 – June 6, 2015 | 7th | Elected in 2011 Lost re-election |
| Ahmad Abubakar | | June 6, 2015 – June 11, 2019 | 8th | Elected in 2015 Lost re-election |
| Binos Dauda Yaroe | | June 11, 2019 – present | 9th, 10th | Elected in 2019 Re-elected in 2023 |
