= Adamawa Central senatorial district =

Senatorial district in Nigeria

Coordinates: 9.3333°N 12.5000°E

Adamawa Central senatorial district

The Adamawa Central senatorial district in Adamawa State, Nigeria covers the local government areas of Fufore, Gombi, Girei, Hong, Song, Yola North, and Yola South.

The senator currently representing the district is Aminu Iya Abbas of the Peoples Democratic Party who was elected in 2023.

== List of members representing the district ==
Political party: NRC APC PDP

Member	Party	Years	Assembly	Electoral history
District created December 5, 1992
Hamman Bello Ahmed		December 5, 1992 – November 17, 1993	3rd	Elected in 1992 Third Republic dissolved
Abubakar Girei		June 3, 1999 – June 3, 2003	4th	Elected in 1999
Jibril Aminu		June 3, 2003 – June 6, 2011	5th, 6th	Elected in 2003 Re-elected in 2007 Retired
Bello Mohammed Tukur		June 6, 2011 – June 6, 2015	7th	Elected in 2011 Lost re-election
Abdul-Aziz Nyako		June 6, 2015 – June 11, 2019	8th	Elected in 2015 Retired
Aishatu Dahiru Ahmed		June 11, 2019 – June 11, 2023	9th	Elected in 2019 Retired
Aminu Iya Abbas		13 June 2023 – present	10th	Elected in 2023
