= Adamawa North senatorial district =

Senatorial district in Nigeria

Coordinates: 10.2667°N 13.2667°E

Adamawa North senatorial district

The Adamawa North senatorial district in Adamawa State, Nigeria covers the local government areas of Madagali, Maiha, Michika, Mubi North, and Mubi South.

The senator currently representing the district is Amos Yohanna of the Peoples Democratic Party who was elected in 2023.

== List of members representing the district ==
Political party: NRC APC PDP

Member	Party	Years	Assembly	Electoral history
District created December 5, 1992
Paul Wampana		December 5, 1992 – November 17, 1993	3rd	Elected in 1992 Third Republic dissolved
Iya Abubakar		June 3, 1999 – June 5, 2007	4th, 5th	Elected in 1999 Re-elected in 2003
Mohammed Mana		June 5, 2007 – June 6, 2011	6th	Elected in 2007 Lost re-election
Bindow Jibrilla		June 6, 2011 – June 6, 2015	7th	Elected in 2011 Retired
Binta Masi Garba		June 6, 2015 – June 11, 2019	8th	Elected in 2015 Lost re-election
Ishaku Abbo		June 11, 2019 – October 16, 2023	9th, 10th	Elected in 2019 Lost re-election
Amos Yohanna		October 16, 2023 – present	10th	Elected in 2023
