= Mubi (town) =

Town in Adamawa, Nigeria

Mubi "Muubi"
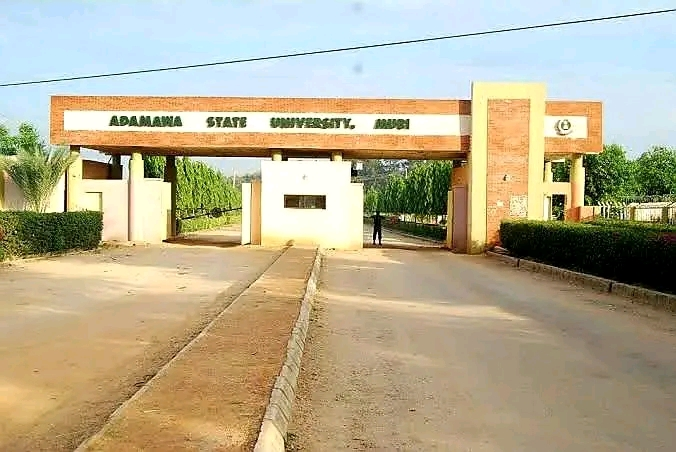
- Nickname: "Sabon Dale"
- Motto: "Home of Peace"
- Location in Nigeria
- Coordinates: 10°16′N 13°16′E
- Country: Nigeria
- State: Adamawa State
- LGAs: Mubi North; Mubi South

Government
  - Emir: Abubakar Isa Ahmadu

Population (1991)
  - Total: 128,900

Mubi is a town in the Northern Senatorial District of Adamawa State, northeast Nigeria. It is subdivided into two Mubi North and Mubi South.

== Demographics ==
The major tribes of the town are Fali, Gude, Mafa, Kamwe, Margi and Mundang (Godo-godo).

== Education ==
Mubi has four higher institutions of learning: Federal Polytechnic, Mubi, College of Health Technology (Mubi Campus), Adamawa State University, Mubi, and The Federal University of Agriculture, Mubi.

== Boko Haram takeover ==
Some media outlets said that the city was renamed to Madinatul Islam, meaning city of Islam by jihadist group Boko Haram in October 2014 when they captured the town under their control.

In November 2014, the Nigerian Army took back control of Mubi from Boko Haram. Adamawa State governor Bala James Ngilari said government forces had recaptured the town from Boko Haram. Some reports said Boko Haram had withdrawn from the town after looting peoples goods and money to their hideout from the town, rather than as the result of direct fighting. However, Bala Ngilari's chief of staff, Chibudo Babbi, told the BBC Hausa Service that remnants of the group were flushed out of Mubi by the military.

== Massacres ==
A terrorist attack on 2 October 2012 when suspected members of Boko Haram entered the town at around 10pm and killed many people. The large majority of the victims were students from the three educational institutions (Federal Polytechnic Mubi, School Of Health Technology and Adamawa State University) based in the town. The death toll was put at 25 initially, however, the number is said to be closer to 45.

A bombing occurred in Mubi on 1 June 2014.

On 21 November 2017, a suicide bombing at a mosque during morning prayers killed an estimate 25-50 people. Boko Haram is the suspected perpetrator.

Suicide bombings occurred at a mosque and market in Mubi in 2018.

== Climate ==
Köppen-Geiger climate classification system classifies its climate as tropical wet and dry (Aw).

Climate data for Mubi, Adamawa
Month	Jan	Feb	Mar	Apr	May	Jun	Jul	Aug	Sep	Oct	Nov	Dec	Year
Mean daily maximum °C (°F)	32 (90)	33.9 (93.0)	36.4 (97.5)	36.7 (98.1)	33.9 (93.0)	30.9 (87.6)	28.8 (83.8)	27.8 (82.0)	29 (84)	32 (90)	33.5 (92.3)	32 (90)	32.2 (90.1)
Daily mean °C (°F)	23.5 (74.3)	25.6 (78.1)	28.3 (82.9)	29.3 (84.7)	27.5 (81.5)	25.4 (77.7)	24 (75)	23.4 (74.1)	24 (75)	25.2 (77.4)	25.2 (77.4)	23.4 (74.1)	25.4 (77.7)
Mean daily minimum °C (°F)	15 (59)	17.3 (63.1)	20.3 (68.5)	22 (72)	21.2 (70.2)	19.9 (67.8)	19.3 (66.7)	19.1 (66.4)	19 (66)	18.5 (65.3)	16.9 (62.4)	14.9 (58.8)	18.6 (65.5)
Average precipitation mm (inches)	0 (0)	0 (0)	3 (0.1)	30 (1.2)	98 (3.9)	135 (5.3)	202 (8.0)	258 (10.2)	164 (6.5)	43 (1.7)	2 (0.1)	0 (0)	935 (37)
Source: Climate-Data.org (altitude: 572m)

== Cattle market ==
Mubi is the home of the state famous international cattle market popularly known as kasuwan shanu or Kasuwan tike situated at the center of the town, large numbers of cattle and sheep are bought by customers mainly from north eastern Nigeria and being distributed to different parts of southern Nigeria by trailers and trucks.

== Notable residents ==
Mubi is home to prominent Nigerians including:

- Iya Abubakar (Prof of Mathematics)
- Alex Badeh (Former Chief of Defence Staff of Nigeria)
- Ibrahim Lamorde (Former EFCC Chairman)
