= 2019 Nigerian Senate elections in Adamawa State =

2019 Nigerian Senate election in Adamawa State

The 2019 Nigerian Senate election in Adamawa State was held on February 23, 2019, to elect members of the Nigerian Senate to represent Adamawa State. Binos Dauda Yaroe representing Adamawa South and Ishaku Elisha Abbo representing Adamawa North won on the platform of Peoples Democratic Party, while Aishatu Dahiru Ahmed representing Adamawa Central won on the platform of All Progressives Congress.

== Overview ==
Affiliation	Party		Total
Affiliation	PDP	APC	Total
Before Election	0	3	3
After Election	2	1	3

== Summary ==
District	Incumbent	Party	Elected Senator	Party
Adamawa South	Ahmad Abubakar	APC	Binos Dauda Yaroe	PDP
Adamawa Central	Abdul-Aziz Nyako	ADC	Aishatu Dahiru Ahmed	APC
Adamawa North	Binta Garba	APC	Ishaku Elisha Abbo	PDP

== Results ==
=== Adamawa South ===
A total of 13 candidates registered with the Independent National Electoral Commission to contest in the election. PDP candidate Binos Dauda Yaroe won the election, defeating APC Abubakar Ahmad Mdallahyidi and 11 other party candidates. Yaroe scored 144,403 votes, while APC candidate scored 118,129 votes.

2019 Nigerian Senate election in Adamawa State
Party	Candidate	Votes	%
PDP	Binos Dauda Yaroe	144,403	
APC	Abubakar Ahmad Mdallahyidi	118,129	
Others			
Total votes		308,243	100%
PDP hold			

=== Adamawa Central ===
A total of 12 candidates registered with the Independent National Electoral Commission to contest in the election. APC candidate Aishatu Dahiru Ahmed won the election, defeating PDP candidate Modibbo Murtala Mohammed and 10 other party candidates. Ahmed pulled 188,526 votes, while PDP candidate Murtala Chibado scored 96,530 and African Democratic Congress (ADC) candidate Mustafa Madawaki scored 36,030.

2019 Nigerian Senate election in Osun State
Party	Candidate	Votes	%
APC	Aishatu Dahiru Ahmed	188,526	
PDP	Modibbo Murtala Mohammed	96,530	
Others			
Total votes		330.079	100%
APC hold			

=== Adamawa North ===
A total of 15 candidates registered with the Independent National Electoral Commission to contest in the election. PDP candidate Ishaku Elisha Cliff Abbo won the election, defeating APC candidate and incumbent senator, Binta Garba. Abbo pulled 79,337 votes while his closest rival Binta Garba pulled 63,119 votes.

2019 Nigerian Senate election in Adamawa State
Party	Candidate	Votes	%
PDP	Ishaku Elisha Abbo	79,337	
APC	Binta Garba	63,219	
Others			
Total votes		178,425	100%
PDP hold			
