= Abbas Aminu Iya =

Nigerian politician (born 1973)

Aminu Iya Abbas

Senator for Adamawa Central
- Incumbent
- Assumed office 13 June 2023
- Preceded by: Aishatu Dahiru Ahmed

Chairman of the Senate Committee on Science and Technology
- Incumbent
- Assumed office 8 August 2023
- Preceded by: Uche Lilian Ekwunife

Speaker of Adamawa State House of Assembly
- In office 11 June 2019 – 12 June 2023
- Preceded by: Kabiru Mijinýawa
- Succeeded by: Bathiya Wesley

Member in Adamawa State House of Assembly
- In office 11 June 2019 – 12 June 2023
- Preceded by: Abubakar Atiku
- Constituency: Uba/Gaya
- In office June 2011 – June 2015
- Succeeded by: Abubakar Atiku
- Constituency: Uba/Gaya

Personal details
- Born: 1973 (age 52–53) Yola, North-Eastern state (now in Adamawa state)
- Party: PDP
- Education: Bayero University Kano
- Profession: Politician
- Website: Senate website

Aminu Iya Abbas (born June 1973) is a Nigerian politician who is the Senator for Adamawa Central. He was 2 terms Member of Adamawa State House of Assembly and served as Speaker of the Assembly between 2019 and 2023.

== Background ==
Iya was born in the city of Yola in 1973. He attended the Central Primary school in Uba, Hong in Adamawa state. In 2000, he received his BSc in accounting from Bayero University Kano (BUK). He later obtained a master's degree in Treasury Management from BUK in 2008.

=== Professional career ===
For his National Youth Service Corps (NYSC) service, he worked at the Nigeria National Liquified Natural GAS between 2001 and 2002. After his service, he joined Sigma Securities in 2002 and later joining the Economic and Financial Crimes Commission as a forensic expert and pioneer accountant. He later worked for Africa Petroleum Nigeria and KPMG, between 2008 and 2011. A Chartered Accountant and Certified Fraud Examiner.

== Political career ==
In 2011, Iya ran for and secured the position of the Adamawa State House of Assembly representative for the Uba/Gaya constituency. From 2011 to 2015, he represented his constituents while assuming multiple roles within the House. These roles included serving as the Chief Whip, Deputy Minority Leader, Minority Leader, Deputy Chief Whip, as well as chairing and being a member of several standing committees.

Iya was unable to retain his seat in the House after losing the State House of Assembly election in 2015 but still remaining in PDP. However, he ran again in 2019 and managed to emerge victorious, securing his representation of the Uba/Gaya constituency. He was appointed as the Speaker of the House, serving in that role until 2023.

In 2023, Iya contested the position of Senator for Adamawa Central, facing off against the former incumbent, Abdul-Aziz Nyako, who had held the position from 2015 to 2019. He emerged victorious in the election and now represents Adamawa Central in the Senate of Nigeria.

Iya was appointed chairman of the Senate Committee on Science and Tech of the 10th Senate.

Iya sponsored a motion titled "Needs to prevent loss of lives caused by floods and undredged River Benue In Adamawa State” on the need to provide solutions to the floods that have ravaged about seven local government areas of Adamawa state: Fufore, Yola North, Yola South, Girei in Adamawa Central and Numan, Lamurde and Demsa in Adamawa South. According to Iya:

On Wednesday 1 November 2023, 32 people were on board trying to cross the river at Garin Alaji near Chikito village where the boat capsized but only 7 bodies were discovered and five rescued alive, the remaining are unaccounted for up till now in addition to the earlier reported case where 53 people lost their lives in the same river.

Senator Iya attributed these floods to the periodic release of water from the Lagdo Dam by Cameroonian authorities, causing the Benue River to overflow its banks. To address the issue, he proposed the construction of the Dasin Hausa Dam as a preventive measure to mitigate future flooding.
