= Alkasum Abba =

Nigerian Professor and former Vice Chancellor of University in Nigeria

Alkasum Abba (born 20 May 1953) is a Nigerian professor, academic, writer and a former vice chancellor of Adamawa state University.

== Early life and education ==
Born on 20 May 1953 in Yola, Adamawa State, he attended Ahmadu Bello University, Zaria where he gained a bachelor's degree (combined Hons) in history and government in 1977. He obtained his master's and PhD in same university. He has written twelve books and over fifty academic publications and attended many national and international conferences.

== Career ==
Alkasum is a former vice chancellor and sole administrator of Adamawa State university. he is a pro-chancellor and chairman of the governing council of Federal University of agriculture, Makurdi and has worked in various capacities. He is part of Research team of Centre for Democratic Development, Research, and Training, Zaria.
