= Ahmed Hassan Barata =

Nigerian politician

Federal Representative for Guyuk/Shelleng, Adamawa State
- In office May 1999 – May 2003

Senator for Adamawa South
- In office May 2011 – May 2015
- Preceded by: Grace Folashade Bent
- Succeeded by: Ahmad Abubakar

Personal details
- Party: People's Democratic Party (PDP)
- Profession: Politician

Ahmed Hassan Barata is a Nigerian politician who was elected to the Nigerian Senate for the Adamawa South Senatorial seat in Adamawa State, Nigeria in the April 2011 federal elections. He ran for election on the People's Democratic Party (PDP) platform.

Barata was elected to the House of Representatives for the Guyuk/Shelleng constituency in May 1999; he served until May 2003. He contested for reelection for that constituency in April 2007 but he was defeated by James Audu Kwawo of the Action Congress. He was also a governorship Aspirant in Adamawa State, 2015

Barata won the PDP nomination for the 2011 Adamawa South Senatorial race in a primary election. He received 738 votes, defeating the incumbent Senator Grace Folasade Bent, who had received 406. Bent, who was said to have been favored by the PDP party leadership, later claimed that she had won a rerun primary. While her assertion was being reviewed, a judge ordered the Independent National Electoral Commission (INEC) to remove Barata's name from the list of candidates and replace it with Bent. Bent's claim was later rejected by the INEC, by the Federal High Court, Abuja and by the PDP's counsel.

In the 9 April 2011 elections, Barata won with 101,760 votes, ahead of Mohammed Koiraga Jada of the Action Congress of Nigeria (ACN) with 66,525 votes.

In 2013, Barata voted to legalise child marriage.

In November 2013, Barata distributed grinding machines, sewing machines, hairdressing equipment, and local irrigation tools for dry season farming to his constituents. He then warned the beneficiaries that they would be cursed by God if they did not vote for him in the 2015 elections. This statement angered some of the constituents, who decided to reject his 'gifts', while others decided to accept them but still not vote for him. The program caused further controversy because the disbursement took place at his personal residence in Yola, rather than in the nine local government areas within his senatorial district.

Barata failed to retain his position after receiving only 39 votes, compared to Jonathan Zwingina's 274 votes, during the National Assembly primaries for the PDP.
