= Zainab Lawal Gummi =

Commissioner for Women, Children and Social Development, Zamfara State

Commissioner of Education

Zainab Lawal Gummi is the commissioner for Education of Zamfara State of Nigeria. She was appointed by governor Bello Matawalle.

== Career ==
Gummi has stated that she supports free access to education and gender equality. She also stated that their state was committed to ending all forms of child abuse such as destitution, trafficking and child labour. It would be achieved through traditional rulers and engagement of Islamic scholars to help guide the implementation of laws.

== Gender-based violence and education advocacy ==
Zaninab as the Commissioner for women affairs and social development in zamfara state has fought against gender based violence, She urged people to give fair treatment and protection to women affected by gender based violence. She also urged communities and relevant stakeholders to support works that are aimed at protecting the rights and welfare of women across zamfara state. In March 2020, Gummi advocated for free access to education for girls in Zamfara State. She did this during activities marking the 2020 International Women’s Day, where she led a group of women on a courtesy visit to the Zamfara State deputy governor, Mahdi Aliyu Gusau. Where She appealed to the state government and other stakeholders to give more attention to girl-child education, healthcare, and women’s participation in public life.

== Advocacy for women participation in politics ==
In November 2022, expressed her happiness to the courts judgement involving Aisha Binani stating that the ruling of the court shows the people of this country that courts in Nigeria were ready to ensure justice wherever necessary and showed that women had become more active and influential in Nigerian politics. She stated that the development was an indication of the increasing acceptance of women in politics in Nigeria.
