= 2007 Nigerian Senate elections in Adamawa State =

The 2007 Nigerian Senate election in Adamawa State was held on 21 April 2007, to elect members of the Nigerian Senate to represent Adamawa State. Jibrin Muhammad Aminu representing Adamawa Central, Grace Folashade Bent representing Adamawa South and Mohammed Mana representing Adamawa North all won on the platform of the People's Democratic Party.

== Overview ==
Affiliation	Party		Total
Affiliation	AC	PDP	Total
Before Election	0	3	3
After Election	0	3	3

== Summary ==
District	Incumbent	Party	Elected Senator	Party
Adamawa Central	Iya Abubakar	PDP	Jibril Aminu	ANPP
Adamawa South	Jonathan Zwingina	PDP	Grace Folashade Bent	PDP
Adamawa North	Abubakar Girei	PDP	Mohammed Mana	AC

== Results ==
=== Adamawa Central ===
The election was won by Jibril Aminu of the Peoples Democratic Party (Nigeria).

2007 Nigerian Senate election in Bauchi State
Party	Candidate	Votes	%
PDP	Jibril Aminu		
Total votes			
PDP hold			

=== Adamawa South ===
The election was won by Grace Folashade Bent of the Peoples Democratic Party (Nigeria).

2007 Nigerian Senate election in Adamawa State
Party	Candidate	Votes	%
PDP	Grace Folashade Bent		
Total votes			
PDP hold			

=== Adamawa North ===
The election was won by Mohammed Mana of the Peoples Democratic Party (Nigeria).

2007 Nigerian Senate election in Adamawa State
Party	Candidate	Votes	%
PDP	Grace Folashade Bent		
Total votes			
PDP hold			
