= 2011 Nigerian Senate elections in Adamawa State =

The 2011 Nigerian Senate election in Adamawa State was held on April 9, 2011, to elect members of the Nigerian Senate to represent Adamawa State. Bindo Jibrilla representing Adamawa North, Ahmed Hassan Barata representing Adamawa South and Bello Muhammed Tukur representing Adamawa Central all won on the platform of People's Democratic Party.

== Overview ==
Affiliation	Party		Total
Affiliation	ACN	PDP	Total
Before Election	0	3	3
After Election	0	3	3

== Summary ==
District	Incumbent	Party	Elected Senator	Party
Adamawa North	Mohammed Mana		Bindo Jibrilla	PDP
Adamawa South	Grace Folashade Bent		Ahmed Hassan Barata	PDP
Adamawa Central	Jibril Aminu		Bello Muhammed Tukur	PDP

=== Adamawa North ===
People's Democratic Party candidate Bindo Jibrilla won the election, defeating Action Congress candidate Haruna Boni and other party candidates.

2011 Nigerian Senate election in Adamawa State
Party	Candidate	Votes	%
PDP	Bindawa Jibrilla		
APC	Haruna Boni		
Total votes			
PDP hold			

=== Adamawa South ===
People's Democratic Party candidate Ahmed Hassan Barata won the election, defeating Action Congress candidate Jada Koiriga Mohammed and other party candidates.

2011 Nigerian Senate election in Adamawa State
Party	Candidate	Votes	%
PDP	Hassan Barata		
APC	Dahiru Bobbo		
Total votes			
PDP hold			

=== Adamawa Central ===
People's Democratic Party candidate Bello Muhammed Tukur won the election, defeating Labour Party candidate Dahiru Bobbo and other party candidates.

2011 Nigerian Senate election in Adamawa State
Party	Candidate	Votes	%
PDP	Muhammed Tukur		
LP	Dahiru Bobbo		
Total votes			
PDP hold			
