= 2014 Mubi bombing =

2014 terrorist attack in Nigeria

Coordinates: 10.2667°N 13.2667°E

- Part of the Boko Haram insurgency
- Location of Adamawa State in Nigeria
- Location: Mubi, Adamawa State, Nigeria
- Date: 1 June 2014
- Attack type: Bombing
- Weapon: Improvised explosive device
- Deaths: 40
- Injuries: 19
- Perpetrator: Boko Haram

On the evening of 1 June 2014, an improvised explosive device was set off at a football field in Mubi, Adamawa State, Nigeria. At least 40 people were killed in the attack, according to eyewitnesses. Nineteen others were injured. The perpetrators of the attack were not clear, although media reports generally blamed Boko Haram.

== Background ==
Mubi is located a few miles from the Cameroon–Nigeria border. It is one of three towns in northeastern Nigeria that have been under a state of emergency for more than a year. Even so, Adamawa State's attacks by the Boko Haram insurgency include massacres in Mubi in 2012, 2014, 2017 and 2018.

Boko Haram is an Islamist terrorist group opposed to what they perceive as the Westernisation of Nigeria, which they say is the root cause of criminal behaviour in the country. Thousands of people have been killed in attacks perpetrated by the group, and the federal government declared a state of emergency in May 2013 in Borno State in its fight against the insurgency. The resulting crackdown, however, has failed to stabilise the country.

Boko Haram's attacks intensified in 2014. In February, the group killed more than 100 Christian men in the villages of Baga, Borno and Izghe, Borno. Also in February, 59 boys were killed in the Federal Government College attack in Yobe State. In April 2014, the group abducted more than 200 school girls on the same day as a bombing attack in Abuja killed at least 88 people. By mid-April, Boko Haram had been blamed for nearly 4,000 deaths in 2014. At least 500 more people have been killed since then.

After the kidnapping, international attention on the situation greatly intensified. The United States, the United Kingdom, France, and other nations pledged monetary and/or military support to combat Boko Haram. However, attacks continued. On 20 May 2014, 118 people were killed in a pair of bombings in Jos. The following day, two dozen people were killed in a raid on a village.

== Attack ==
At approximately 6:30 pm local time (17:30 UTC), a bomb went off as spectators were leaving a football field in Kabang, Mubi. A number of shops were destroyed in the blast. One survivor described the scene: "After the commotion, I stood up covered with my own blood, but I realized that I was lucky to be injured as those who were not that lucky were shattered into pieces."

According to one eyewitness, the blast appeared to come from within a crowd of people walking across the field on their way home, possibly suggesting the attack was the work of a suicide bomber. However, other eyewitnesses said a car had delivered the explosives. A similar attack was attempted at a football field in Jos the previous weekend, but the would-be-suicide bomber blew up before reaching the target.

Initial reports said 14 people were killed in the attack and 12 injured. The official death toll was upped to 18 with 19 injuries the next day. However, the actual death toll was much higher according to locals. A nurse said the morgue at the local hospital was "overcrowded" with 40 or more bodies; a police officer backed her report. An eyewitness who lost two family members said about 45 people had died.

== Suspects ==
Media reports were quick to link the attack to Boko Haram. However, the area has also been subject to non-Boko Haram violence in recent years, so the perpetrators were not clear. On 2 June, a suspect was arrested by the military who had surrounded the city in hopes of catching the perpetrator. Eyewitnesses reported seeing the suspect's car at the scene of the bombing.

== Reaction ==
Politicians including Adamawa State governor Murtala Nyako and the Speaker of the state House of Assembly, Ahmadu Umaru Fintiri, described the attack as barbaric. Nyako said the government was saddened by the attack, but called on citizens to remain calm and assist in the investigation. The military surrounded the town in an effort to catch those responsible for the attack.

== See also ==
- Islamic extremism in Northern Nigeria
- Insurgency in the Maghreb (2002–present)
- War against the Islamic State
- List of massacres in Nigeria
- List of ongoing armed conflicts
- List of terrorist incidents in 2014
- List of wars and battles involving ISIL
