= Abubakar Baba Zango =

Nigerian politician and Businessman

Abubakar Baba Zango is a Nigerian politician. He is currently serving as a member representing Yola North/South and Girei Federal Constituency of Adamawa State in the House of Representatives.
