= 2018 Mubi suicide bombings =

Suicide bombing in Nigeria

- Part of the Boko Haram insurgency
- Location: Mubi, Adamawa State, Nigeria
- Date: 1 May 2018 (UTC+1)
- Target: Worshippers, traders, shoppers
- Attack type: Suicide bombings
- Weapon: Suicide vests
- Deaths: 86
- Injuries: 58

On 1 May 2018, two suicide bombers detonated their explosives at a mosque and a market in the town of Mubi in the state of Adamawa in eastern Nigeria, killing at least 86 people and injuring 58 others. The blasts were carried out by young boys and happened shortly after 1:00 pm (12:00 GMT). No group claimed responsibility for the attack, but the blame was attributed to the Boko Haram Islamist extremist group.

Major attacks had occurred in Mubi in 2012, 2014 and 2017.
