= Federal University of Agriculture, Mubi =

Public university in Mubi, Adamawa State, Nigeria

- Type: Public
- Established: 2023
- Location: Mubi, Adamawa State, Nigeria
- Campus: Urban

Federal University of Agriculture, Mubi (FUAMB), is a public university located in Mubi, Adamawa State, Nigeria. and operated by the Federal Government of Nigeria.

== History ==
The Federal University of Agriculture, Mubi evolved from the former Federal College of Agriculture, Mubi, which was established in 1978. In 2021, the Federal Government approved its upgrade to a full-fledged university.

== Location ==
The university is situated in Mubi, a major town in Adamawa State in northeastern Nigeria. The town is known for its commercial activities and proximity to agricultural communities, making it a strategic location for an agriculture-focused institution.

== Academic structure ==
The Federal University of Agriculture, Mubi offers programmes primarily focused on agriculture and allied sciences.

Faculty of Agriculture:

- B. Agric (General Agriculture)
- B.Sc. Animal Science
- B.Sc. Crop Production
- B.Sc. Soil Science
- B.Sc. Agricultural Extension and Rural Development

Faculty of Agricultural Economics and Agribusiness:

- B.Sc. Agricultural Economics
- B.Sc. Agribusiness and Management

Faculty of Science and Technology:

- B.Sc. Biology
- B.Sc. Microbiology
- B.Sc. Computer Science
- B.Sc. Statistics
- B.Sc. Chemistry

== See also ==
- List of universities in Nigeria
- Agriculture in Nigeria
