= Save Democracy Group Africa =

For past Presidents in Africa

Save Democracy Group Africa (SDGA), is a Non-governmental organization (NGO) of past Presidents in Africa, aim at bringing past and Present African political leaders together so as to Foster unity and better Transition of power.

== History ==
The group was formed in Nigeria 2008 to ensure the survival of Democracy in Africa and create a leadership succession culture in the country.

SDGA has helped to expand the frontiers of engagement of political stakeholders, to create and exchange ideas that would re-engineer the polity and strengthen good governance and enhancing continuous dialogue among leaders in African political, ethnic and religious divides.

== Awards ==
Nelson Mandela Leadership awards is an award organised by the group to honour past Presidents or political office holder in Africa like Olusegun Obasanjo, Goodluck Jonathan, Jonathan Zwingina, Senator Ben Obi, Umaru Tanko Al-Makura, Mohammed Abdullahi Abubakar, Joseph Boakai etc. who ensures that there is respect for constitutionally stipulated tenure of office while in leadership in the African continent.

The effect of the award is to encourage the political class in the continent to change their concept and perception of leadership, promote principle of peace and forgiveness, good and transparent governance as well as respect to constitutional term limits.
