= Aishatu Dahiru Ahmed =

Nigerian politician (born 1971)

Aishatu Dahiru Ahmed Gimbiyar Adamawa
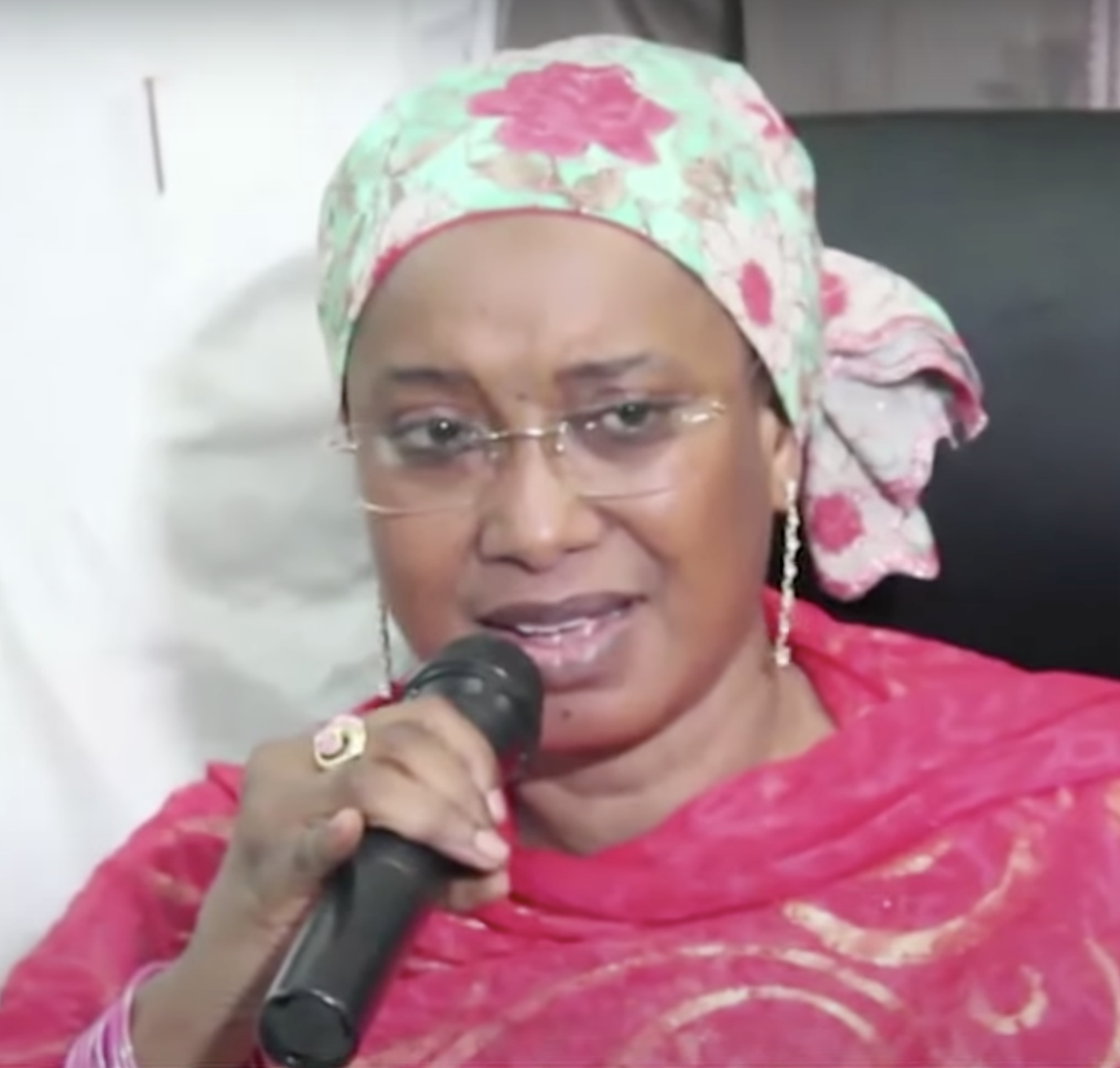
- Binani in 2022

Senator for Adamawa Central
- In office 11 June 2019 – 11 June 2023
- Preceded by: Abdul-Aziz Nyako
- Succeeded by: Abbas Aminu Iya

Member of the House of Representatives of Nigeria from Adamawa
- In office 6 June 2011 – 6 June 2015
- Preceded by: Sa'ad Tahir
- Succeeded by: Abubakar Lawal
- Constituency: Yola North/Yola South/Girei

Personal details
- Born: 11 August 1971 (age 55) Kaduna, North-Central State (now Kaduna State), Nigeria
- Party: All Progressives Congress (2018–present)
- Other political affiliations: Peoples Democratic Party (2011–2015); People's Democratic Movement (2015–2018)
- Spouse: Ahmed Modibbo
- Education: Federal Polytechnic, Mubi; University of Southampton; Nasarawa State University
- Occupation: Politician; engineer; entrepreneur
- Nickname: Binani

Aishatu Dahiru Ahmed (born 11 August 1971), popularly known as Aisha Binani, is a Nigerian politician and entrepreneur who was the senator for Adamawa Central from 2019 to 2023. On 30 March 2020, she was appointed Gimbiyar Adamawa by the Adamawa Emirate Council.

== Background ==
Binani was born on 11 August 1971, in Kaduna city. Her father, Dahiru Ahmed Chiroma, was a son of Ahmadu Malabu, an elder brother to Muhammed Ribadu, Nigeria's first Defence Minister.

=== Education ===
Binani started her early school education in Kaduna and completed it at Gwadabawa Primary School, Jimeta in Yola. She obtained her secondary school education at Government Secondary School, Yola.

In 1993, Binani then attended the Federal Polytechnic of Mubi where she obtained an Ordinary National Diploma and then Higher National Diploma in Electrical and Electronics Engineering. She completed her National Youths Service Corps (NYSC) service in Borno state where she won the state merit award for outstanding performance.

Binani furthered her education by pursuing a certificate in Rural Radio Systems at the University of Southampton in the UK. Additionally, she holds a postgraduate diploma in Business Management and a certificate in Data Processing from Nasarawa State University in Keffi.

=== Personal life ===
Binani is married to Professor Ahmed Modibbo, a former Executive Secretary of the Universal Basic Education Commission (UBEC), who is believed to be one of the wealthiest individuals in Adamawa state.

== Political career ==
In 2011, Binani joined politics. She was elected member of the 7th National Assembly where she represented Yola North, Yola South and Girei Constituency of Adamawa State in the House of Representatives from 2011 to 2015, under PDP, the ruling party at the time. While serving in this position, she was Chairman, House committee on Constituency Outreach, member committee on Appropriations, Land Transports, Millennium Development Goals and Petroleum resources (Downstream) Public Service Matter. In 2015, while she was still a legislator, she distributed 75,000 school bags to pupils in her constituency. Her efforts in the House of Representatives have encompassed various areas, including healthcare services, educational development, agricultural assistance, employment generation, and infrastructural development. These initiatives have aimed to address the needs of the people of her constituency.

Following her tenure in the House of Representatives in 2015, she pursued the candidacy for the Senatorial position representing Adamawa Central, while her husband, Ahmed Modibbo, concurrently sought the position of Governor of Adamawa, both as members of the Peoples Democratic Movement (PDM). She lost to Abdulaziz Nyako while Modibbo lost to Bindow, both APC candidates.

In the 2019 general election, Binani contested once again for the position of Senator for Adamawa Central, but this time as a candidate of the All Progressives Congress (APC), the ruling party at the time. Her candidacy was confirmed in 2018 after winning the party's primary election where she garnered 1,282 votes, surpassing her opponent, Aliyu Wakili Boya, who received 599 votes, thus securing her position as the APC candidate for the senatorial seat in Adamawa Central. She emerged victorious in the general election, securing a total of 188,526 votes. Her victory marked a significant margin as she defeated the candidate from the People's Democratic Party (PDP), Murtala Chubado Modibbo, by a margin of 91,966 votes, as per the official results announced by the Independent National Electoral Commission (INEC). This made her the only female senator from northern Nigeria in the 9th National Assembly. While serving as in this role, she was the Chairman of the Senate Committee on Sustainable Development Goals (SDGs).

=== 2023 Adamawa Governorship election ===
Binani decided to contest for the position of Governor of Adamawa in 2023. In a competitive primary election that involved prominent figures such as former governor Jibrilla Bindow; pioneer Executive Chairman Economic and Financial Crimes Commission (EFCC), Nuhu Ribadu; and influential Federal legislator Abdurazaq Namdas, she emerged the candidate.

She received 430 votes with the runner-up, Nuhu Ribadu, receiving 288 votes. Ribadu filed a lawsuit challenging the validity of the election. In his suit, he sought the nullification of the exercise and requested the disqualification of Binani. Ribadu based his claims on allegations of vote buying, over-voting, and delegate inducement. The lawsuit raised concerns regarding the integrity and fairness of the primary election process. In October 2022, the Federal High Court in Yola made a decision to nullify the primaries. Following this development, the First Lady of Nigeria, Aisha Buhari, an indigine of Adamawa herself, encouraged Binani to accept the court's ruling and consider joining the ticket as Nuhu Ribadu's deputy governor. However, Senator Binani chose to challenge the court's ruling at the Appeal Court. In November, the Appeal Court reinstated her as the governorship candidate, allowing her to continue her candidacy. She was officially declared the winner of the election and was the flagbearer of the All Progressives Congress (APC) for the gubernatorial race.

Binani contested against the incumbent Ahmadu Fintiri, in the 2023 general election. Fintiri ran as the Peoples Democratic Party (PDP) candidate. On 15 April 2023, during the process of collating election results, the state resident electoral commissioner, Hudu Ari, made an illegal declaration of Binani as the winner of the poll. Binani subsequently delivered an acceptance speech, which generated significant controversy. In response, the national electoral body, the Independent National Electoral Commission (INEC) swiftly nullified Ari's decision and suspended him from his position. Simultaneously, President Muhammad Buhari ordered a thorough investigation into the conduct of the electoral commissioner and the security personnel who were present during the declaration. Following the completion of the collation process, the results of the election were officially announced. Governor Fintiri emerged as the winner, securing a total of 430,861 votes. Binani, on the other hand, attained the position of runner-up, obtaining 398,738 votes.

==== Aftermath ====
Hudu Ari was arrested in May, a month after the controversial announcement and received a 6-count charge filed against him by INEC in July over "alleged electoral offences". Binani, represented by her lawyer Michael Aondoakaa, filed an ex-parte application on 10 July to challenge INEC's decision to nullify Hudu Ari's announcement. Aondoakaa argued that the election petition tribunal should have the authority to decide the outcome, citing relevant sections of the Electoral Act. He expressed concerns that INEC's decision could hinder the resolution of Binani's petition within the designated timeframe. A similar lawsuit had previously been directed to the tribunal by Justice Inyang Ekwo, who advised Binani to approach the tribunal for election-related matters.

Justice Donatus Okorowo of the Federal High Court in Abuja ordered the prosecution of Hudu Ari, the suspended Adamawa State Resident Electoral Commissioner, to be suspended. Furthermore, INEC stated that Ari will face arraignment before an Adamawa State High Court in Yola on 12 July. However, the proceedings were halted as the Federal High Court directed the State Court to suspend the trial pending a decision on Binani's petition at the election tribunal.

In December 2023, the Court of Appeal in Abuja dismissed the appeal of Binani and affirmed Fintiri as Governor of Adamawa State. The Court stressed that the premature announcement of Hudu Ari, the Resident Electoral Commissioner, was illegal.

== Bills and motions ==
- Modibo Adama University of Technology (Establishment etc) Bill
- Fiscal Responsibility Commission (Establishment etc) Bill
- 1999 Constitution (Alteration) Bill
- National Dermatology Specialist Hospital, Garkida, Adamawa State (Establishment etc) Bill
- Federal Medical Centre (Establishment etc) Bill
- Modibo Adama University Yola Teaching Hospital (Establishment) Bill
- Federal Medical Centre Mubi, Adamawa State (Establishment etc) Bill
- University Teaching Hospital (Reconstitution Of Board) Act (Amendment) Bill
- Criminal Code Act (Amendment) Bill

== Skills ==
- High competence in giving insight on the effective way better laws and policies can be formulated.
- An expert in policy formation, lawmaking and how to effectively achieve SDGs.
