= Jafaru Suleiman Ribadu =

Nigerian politician

Jafaru Suleiman Ribadu is a Nigerian politician representing the Yola North, Yola South, and Girei Federal Constituency of Adamawa State in the National House of Representatives.
