= Amos Yohanna =

Nigerian politician

Reverend Amos Yohanna

Senator for Adamawa North
- Incumbent
- Assumed office 16 October 2023
- Preceded by: Ishaku Abbo

Personal details
- Born: Amos Kumai Yohanna; 4 June 1961 (age 64)
- Party: PDP

Reverend Amos Yohanna (born 4 June 1961) is a Nigerian Senator representing Adamawa North Senatorial District.

== Early life and career ==
Amos Yohanna hails from Mubi North Local Government Area of Adamawa State, North East Nigeria. In October 2023 Amos Yohanna was sworn in as a senator representing the Adamawa North Senatorial District in the Nigerian Senate.

Yohanna was the Director of Operations for the Nigerian Christian Pilgrim Commission, a position he stepped down from in June 2021.
