= Federal Polytechnic, Mubi =

Polytechnic in Adamawa, Nigeria

- Type: Public
- Established: 25 July 1979
- Rector: Dr Abdulrahman Ishaku
- Location: Mubi, Adamawa State, 650101, Nigeria; 10.282°N 13.290°E
- Campus: Urban
- Website: https://fpmubieportal.edu.ng/

Federal Polytechnic, Mubi is a polytechnic based in Mubi, Adamawa State, Northeastern Nigeria.

The polytechnic is one of the seven federal polytechnics established by a decree in 1979. It opened in August of the same year as the Federal Polytechnic, Yola, on the rocky side of the north bank of the Benue River. Following a presidential directive, the polytechnic was relocated to Mubi in October 1982, but it maintained its site in Yola as a consultancy services unit.

== History ==
In Mubi, the institution inherited the building of the defunct Federal School of Arts and Sciences. At present the infrastructures so inherited are being renovated and refurbished to suit Polytechnic requirement. More recently, complete new science and engineering laboratories, workshops and studio have sprung up with heavy machines telling the tales of modem technology. The polytechnic infrastructure includes lecture theater, a library complex, a duplex Office block for the School of Business and General Studies, a block of offices and classrooms for the department of Basic & Applied Sciences, Agricultural Science complex, Food Science & Technology complex and an additional female hostel block among others, are now also in place.

On its movement to Mubi, it took over the facilities of the defunct Federal School of Arts and Science. The Polytechnic commenced operations with programs in Preliminary Studies in the Sciences and Management. The products of these programmes formed the bulk of the candidates admitted for the pioneer National Diploma Programames in the ten Departments of the Polytechnic as at then. These were Agricultural Technology, Food and Chemical Technology, Instrumentation and Analysis, Hotel and Catering Management, Land Surveying, Civil Engineering, Electrical Engineering, Mechanical Engineering, Secretarial Studies and Business Administration and Management. The National Certificate in Education (NCE) was later introduced in 1982.

== Program offer in the School ==
The programs in the Polytechnic continued to grow such that by 2006 the institution had fourteen academic departments and over 3000 students, well above the initial 138 students. Since August 2007, under the progressive leadership of Dr. Mustapha Mohammed Barau, the Polytechnic experienced a monumental growth. As at the 2009/2010 academic session the institution had a students population of well over 14,000 and 36 accredited programs with most modern infrastructure to match. A plan for additional school and seventeen academic departments has reached an advanced stage. The number of staff, which at inception was ten has also grown to about two thousand.

A massacre occurred at the Polytechnic on 1–2 October 2012.

== Library ==
The Library has information resources that support teaching and learning in the institutions.
