= Federal Polytechnic, Mubi attack =

School massacre by Boko Haram

On the night of 1–2 October 2012, a group of armed men attacked a student residence of Federal Polytechnic, Mubi, Adamawa State, eastern Nigeria, killing at least 25 men. The attackers used guns and machetes to kill 22 students and 3 other people.

Major attacks also occurred in Mubi in 2014, 2017 and 2018.
