= 2015 Nigerian Senate elections in Adamawa State =

2015 Nigerian Senate election in Adamawa State

The 2015 Nigerian Senate election in Adamawa State was held on March 28, 2015, to elect members of the Nigerian Senate to represent Adamawa State. Binta Masi Garba representing Adamawa North, Ahmad Abubakar representing Adamawa South and Abdul-Aziz Nyako representing Adamawa Central all won on the platform of All Progressives Congress.

== Overview ==
Affiliation	Party		Total
Affiliation	APC	PDP	Total
Before Election			3
After Election	3	–	3

== Summary ==
District	Incumbent	Party	Elected Senator	Party
Adamawa North			Binta Masi Garba	APC
Adamawa South			Ahmad Abubakar	APC
Adamawa Central			Abdul-Aziz Nyako	APC

== Results ==
=== Adamawa North ===
All Progressives Congress candidate Binta Masi Garba won the election, defeating People's Democratic Party candidate Bala Nggilari and other party candidates.

2015 Nigerian Senate election in Adamawa State
Party	Candidate	Votes	%
APC	Binta Masi Garba		
PDP	Bala Nggilari		
Total votes			
APC hold			

=== Adamawa South ===
All Progressives Congress candidate Ahmad Abubakar won the election, defeating People's Democratic Party candidate Jonathan Zwingina and other party candidates.

2015 Nigerian Senate election in Adamawa State
Party	Candidate	Votes	%
APC	Ahmad Abubakar		
PDP	Jonathan Zwingina		
Total votes			
APC hold			

=== Adamawa Central ===
All Progressives Congress candidate Abdul-Aziz Nyako won the election, defeating People's Democratic Party candidate Aliyu Idi Hong and other party candidates.

2015 Nigerian Senate election in Adamawa State
Party	Candidate	Votes	%
APC	Abdul-Aziz Nyako		
PDP	Aliyu Idi Hong		
Total votes			
APC hold			
