= Adamawa State University =

State University in Nigeria

Adamawa State University, Mubi
- Motto: Education for Development
- Type: Public University
- Established: 2002
- Chairman: Prof. Maxwell M. Gidado (SAN)
- Chancellor: HRH Alhaji Mohammed Seyoji Ahmed
- Vice-Chancellor: Prof. Augustine Clement
- Location: Mubi, Adamawa State, Nigeria; 10.281245°N 13.280169°E
- Campus: Rural
- Website: www.adsu.edu.ng

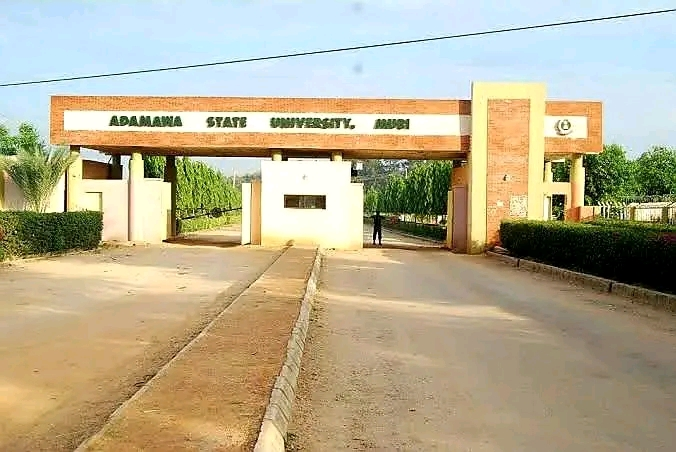
Adamawa_state_University

Adamawa State University is located in Mubi, in the Northern Senatorial District of Adamawa State, Nigeria. It was established in 2002 by the Adamawa State University Law No. 10 of 2001. The title caption of the university is "Towards ensuring rapid development and transformation of the State". The current Vice Chancellor is Prof. Clement Augustine.
