= Zakaria Dauda Nyampa =

Nigerian Politician

Member of the House of Representatives of Nigeria from Adamawa
- Incumbent
- Assumed office June 2023
- Constituency: Michika/Madagali

Personal details
- Born: 12 February 1973 (age 53)
- Citizenship: Nigeria
- Occupation: Politician

Zakaria Dauda Nyampa is a Nigerian politician. He currently serves as a member representing Michika/Madagali Federal Constituency in the House of Representatives.

== Early life ==
Zakaria Dauda Nyampa was born on 12 February 1973 and hails from Adamawa State.

== Political career ==
In 2019, Nyampa contested for the House of Assembly elections and emerged victorious as a member representing Michika/Madagali Federal Constituency. At the 2023 elections, he contested again under the platform of the Peoples Democratic Party (PDP) and won, making his second term as a legislator.

== Religion ==
Hon. Zakaria Dauda Nyampa is a prominent figure known for his contributions and leadership skills and Youth mentorship. As a Christian and a member of the EYN Church, his faith plays a significant role in his life and work.
