= 1999 Nigerian Senate elections in Adamawa State =

The 1999 Nigerian Senate election in Adamawa State was held on February 20, 1999, to elect members of the Nigerian Senate to represent Adamawa State. Abubakar Girei representing Adamawa North, Iya Abubakar representing Adamawa Central and Jonathan Zwingina representing Adamawa South all won on the platform of the Peoples Democratic Party.

== Overview ==
Affiliation	Party		Total
Affiliation	PDP	AD	Total
Before Election			3
After Election	3	0	3

== Summary ==
District	Incumbent	Party	Elected Senator	Party
Adamawa North			Abubakar Girei	PDP
Adamawa Central			Iya Abubakar	PDP
Adamawa South			Jonathan Zwingina	PDP

== Results ==
=== Adamawa North ===
The election was won by Abubakar Girei of the Peoples Democratic Party.

1999 Nigerian Senate election in Adamawa State
Party	Candidate	Votes	%
PDP	Abubakar Girei		
Total votes			
PDP hold			

=== Adamawa Central ===
The election was won by Iya Abubakar of the Peoples Democratic Party.

1999 Nigerian Senate election in Adamawa State
Party	Candidate	Votes	%
PDP	Iya Abubakar		
Total votes			
PDP hold			

=== Adamawa South ===
The election was won by Jonathan Zwingina of the Peoples Democratic Party.

1999 Nigerian Senate election in Adamawa State
Party	Candidate	Votes	%
PDP	Jonathan Zwingina		
Total votes			
PDP hold			
