= Binos Dauda Yaroe =

Nigerian politician

Senator for Adamawa South
- Incumbent
- Assumed office 11 June 2019
- Preceded by: Ahmad Abubakar

Personal details
- Born: January 1, 1955 (age 71)
- Party: People's Democratic Party (PDP)
- Parent: Dauda Yaroe (father)
- Profession: Politician

Binos Dauda Yaroe is the senator representing Adamawa South Senatorial District of Adamawa State at the Nigerian 10th National Assembly.

== Early life ==
Binos Dauda Yaroe was born on January 1, 1955, in Wagole, a village in Ribadu Ward of Mayo-Belwa Local Government Area of Adamawa State, Nigeria. He is married to Salamatu Gimbiya Yaroe (née Joshua) in 1983; they have four Children.

== Education ==
Binos Yaroe started his education at L.E.A Primary School Mayo-Belwa, 1962 – 1969; He then proceeded to Government College Kaduna in 1970 for his Secondary School education, passing out in June 1974 with Division One in the West African School Certificate Examination. Binos Yaroe was admitted into the School of Basic Studies of Ahmadu Bello University in July 1974 as a pioneer student of the one-year I.J.M.B programme. In September 1975, Binos was absorbed into the Faculty of Administration, Kongo Campus, A.B.U Zaria, for B.Sc. Accounting degree program. He graduated in June 1978 with Second Class Upper honours. On joining the NNPC in 1991, Binos Yaroe sat for the professional examination of the Institute of Chartered Accountants of Nigeria (ICAN), passing the final qualifying examination in May 1992 and was admitted as an Associate member of ICAN in February 1993. Upon joining the Nigerian Stock Exchange, Binos Yaroe enrolled for the MBA in Banking and Finance of the University of Nigeria, Nsukka. The programme was run on a weekend basis in collaboration with the Centre for Management Development, Shangisa, Lagos from 1999 to 2002. And following his retirement from service, Binos Yaroe enrolled at the Bronnum Lutheran Seminary (BLS), Mbamba Yola, an affiliate of the University of Jos, in October 2012, for the BA degree in Christian Religious Studies, which he completed in April 2015 earning a Second Class Upper Division honours. He was ordained in February 2017 as a Pastor of the Lutheran Church of Christ in Nigeria (LCCN).

== Career ==
Binos Yaroe began his Career as a Lecturer in Accounting at Anambra State College of Education Awka, where he was posted for the mandatory one-year National Youth Service Corps as his place of primary assignment from September 1978 to August 1979. After his NYSC, Binos worked with the Audit Firms of Deloitte Haskins & Sells, and Unuigbe, Dangana & Co., in Kano, between August 1979 and July 1980.

In August 1980 he joined the service of the College of Preliminary Studies (now Adamawa State Polytechnic) Yola, as an Accountant in the Bursary Department rising to the post of Chief Accountant and head of the Bursary Department by 1987. In January 1988, the then Military Governor of Gongola State appointed Binos Yaroe as the Secretary of the Zing Local Government Area, following the December 1987 nationwide Local Government elections on non-partisan basis. He completed the national assignment in February 1989 and resumed his duties at the College of Preliminary Studies Yola.

Binos Yaroe left the service of the College of Preliminary Studies Yola in March 1991 to join the Nigerian National Petroleum Corporation (NNPC) as an Assistant Chief Accountant. He was posted to the Natural Engineering and Technical Company Ltd (NETCO) in the Finance and Accounts Department. In the seven years he served NNPC/NETCO, Binos was promoted Deputy Chief Accountant and Chief Accountant. As part of his career development, the NNPC/NETCO sent Binos Yaroe on foreign attachments to enable him acquire international exposure. In October 1992, he worked for four weeks with the Finance Unit of the OPEC Secretariat in Vienna, Austria. Then from January to March 1994 he was in the London office of Bechtel Corporation receiving training in the Jobsite General Accounting.

Sen. Binos Yaroe is a technocrat, belonging to many professional bodies. Some of the professional memberships include:

- Fellow, Institute of Chartered Accountants of Nigeria (FCA)
- Fellow, Chartered Institute of Taxation (FCTI)
- Member, Nigerian Institute of Management (MNIM)
- Associate, Institute of Directors (AIoD)
- Member, Institute of Petroleum UK (MInsPet)

Sen. Binos Yaroe served for many years as a member of the following committees of the Institute of Chartered Accountants of Nigeria (ICAN):

- Students Affairs Committee (1998-2001)
- Publications, Public Affairs and Image Committee (2002-2004)
- Electoral Matters Committee (2010-2013)
- Inter-Governmental Relations Committee (since August 2024)

While at the Nigerian Stock Exchange, Binos Yaroe represented The Exchange on the Board of the Nigerian Accounting Standards Board, the Council of Association of Capital Market Registrars and the Administrative Proceedings Committee of the Securities and Exchange Commission. In the course of his career Binos attended numerous courses at home and abroad on general management, Petroleum Accounting, Finance and investments, and Capital Market administration.

Sen. Binos Yaroe retired from the Nigerian Stock Exchange in April 2011 as General Manager/Deputy to the CEO of The Exchange and returned to his hometown Mayo-Belwa, where he took to farming.

== Political career ==
In 2019, Binos Yaroe contested for the Senatorial seat of Adamawa South senatorial district under the platform of the PDP. He won and took his seat in the upper chamber of the National Assembly in June 2019. In the 9th Senate, Sen. Binos Yaroe was appointed Vice-Chairman of the Senate Committee on Capital Market. He was appointed into ten other standing committees of the Senate.

Sen. Binos Yaroe successfully sought re-election in 2023. He was appointed Chairman of the Senate Committee on States and Local Government Affairs in the 10th Senate, along with memberships of 15 other standing committees of the Senate.

In performing his legislative duties, Sen. Binos Yaroe focused on six areas:

1. Health - by way of free medical outreaches to all Local Government Areas in his Senatorial District as well as large gatherings in the State capital, Yola, using his custom made Mobile Hospital. In this regard he has provided free medical services, including surgeries, to over 130,000 members of the public between August 2019 and November 2024.
2. Rural water supply - through the provision of solar or motorised boreholes to over 30 needy communities in the nine Local Government Areas of his constituency.
3. Women and Youths Skills Acquisition Training and Empowerment.
4. Youth development through sponsorship of sporting activities.
5. Regular interaction with constituents through town hall meetings.
6. Effective representation of the Senatorial District at the National Assembly through the presentation of bills, motions, and contribution to debates on national issues.

In the 10th Assembly, Senator Binos Yaroe serves as President of the National Assembly Legislators Fellowship. He was also elected by his Distinguished and Honourable colleagues as Treasurer of the Northern Senators Forum as well as Treasurer of the North East National Assembly Caucus.

== Hobbies ==
Sen. Binos Yaroe is a keen sports enthusiast, with particular interest in football and chess. He sponsored the first Adamawa South Football Tournament among the 9 Local Governments in his constituency. He has also helped sponsor a number of chess tournaments in Adamawa State (especially among IDP Camp children in conjunction with Queen-V Chess Foundation).
