= 2017 Mubi bombing =

Mobi Mosque Bombing

On 21 November 2017, a suicide bombing occurred in Mubi, Adamawa State, Nigeria. A teenager detonated the explosives in a mosque as worshippers arrived for fajr prayer in the large town in eastern Nigeria, killing 50 people.

No group claimed responsibility. The large Islamist group Boko Haram began an insurgency in 2009. They have committed most of the major attacks that have occurred in Nigeria since then. They are suspected of this bombing, as well as attacks in Mubi in 2012, 2014 and 2018.
