= Paul Wampana =

Nigerian politician

Senator
- Constituency: Adamawa North senatorial district

Personal details
- Born: 1946
- Died: 2020 (aged 73–74)
- Profession: Politician

Paul Wampana (born 1946—2020) was a Nigerian senator representing the Adamawa North senatorial district in the Nigerian senate in 1992. He served as Minister of State for Public Health under former president Shehu Shagari's administration in 1983. He was also the speaker of the now-defunct Gongola State House of Assembly.

== Early life and career ==
Paul Wampana was born on 1946 in Vimtim, Mubi, Adamawa. He had his early education at St. Andrew's Primary School, Mubi from 1961 to 1966 and Madagali Senior Primary School 1967. After obtaining his primary education, he later proceeded to Waka Teachers' College, Biu in 1968 and completed it in 1972. Wampana taught as a Grade 11 teacher in 1973. He was admitted to Advanced Teachers' College, Zaria in 1974 for an NCE course, which he completed in 1977, and went on to serve in the National Youth Service Corps scheme in the 1977/78 service year. After finishing the national youth service, he returned to Gongola State to take up an appointment with the state's Ministry of Education as a teacher. He taught at Government Secondary School, Maiha where he also acted as the vice principal. He resigned from his teaching appointment and took to active politics in 1978, where he succeeded in being elected into the state's House of Assembly. He emerged as Speaker of the Gongola State House of Assembly in 1979 and was later appointed Minister of State for Public Health by former president Shehu Shagari in 1983. He became the first senator representing Adamawa North senatorial district which was created in 1992. He later became the zonal vice chairman of North East of the People's Democratic Party.

Wampana died on 10 May 2020 at the age of 74, at his residence in Abuja. The Nigerian senate, under the leadership of Ahmad Lawan mourned his demise.
