= 2003 Nigerian Senate elections in Adamawa State =

2003 Nigerian Senate election in Adamawa State

The 2003 Nigerian Senate election in Adamawa State was held on April 12, 2003, to elect members of the Nigerian Senate to represent Adamawa State. Iya Abubakar representing Adamawa North, Jibril Aminu representing Adamawa Central and Jonathan Zwingina representing Adamawa South all won on the platform of the Peoples Democratic Party.

== Overview ==
Affiliation	Party		Total
Affiliation	PDP	AD	Total
Before Election			3
After Election	3	0	3

== Summary ==
District	Incumbent	Party	Elected Senator	Party
Adamawa North			Iya Abubakar	PDP
Adamawa Central			Jibril Aminu	PDP
Adamawa South			Jonathan Zwingina	PDP

== Results ==
=== Adamawa North ===
The election was won by Iya Abubakar of the Peoples Democratic Party.

2003 Nigerian Senate election in Adamawa State
Party	Candidate	Votes	%
PDP	Iya Abubakar		
Total votes			
PDP hold			

=== Adamawa Central ===
The election was won by Jibril Aminu of the Peoples Democratic Party.

2003 Nigerian Senate election in Adamawa State
Party	Candidate	Votes	%
PDP	Jibril Aminu		
Total votes			
PDP hold			

=== Adamawa South ===
The election was won by Jonathan Zwingina of the Peoples Democratic Party.

2003 Nigerian Senate election in Adamawa State
Party	Candidate	Votes	%
PDP	Jonathan Zwingina		
Total votes			
PDP hold			
