= Ishaku Abbo =

Nigerian politician

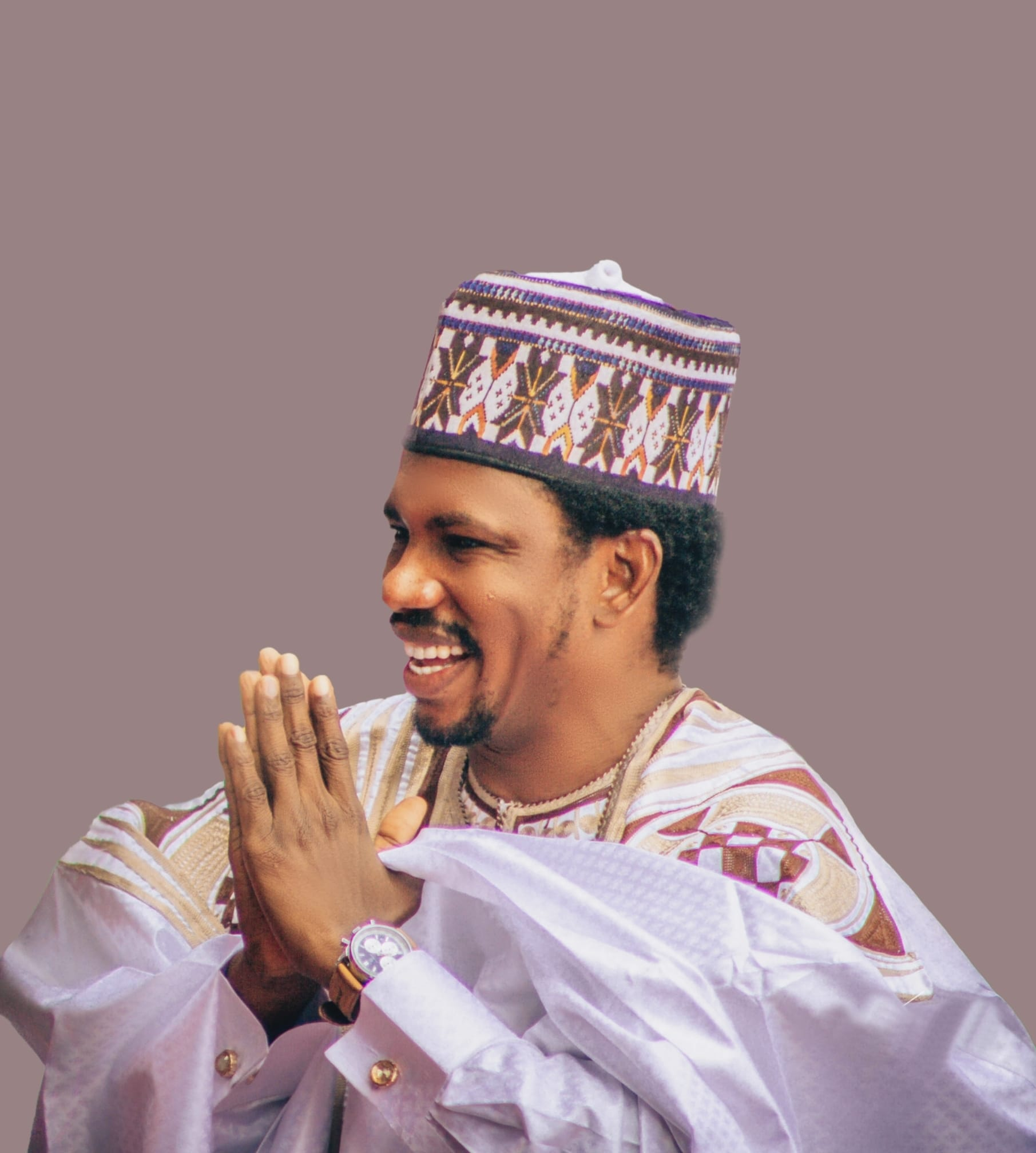

Senator of the Federal Republic of Nigeria
- In office 11 June 2019 – 16 October 2023
- Preceded by: Binta Masi Garba
- Succeeded by: Amos Yohanna
- Constituency: Adamawa North

Personal details
- Born: Ishaku Elisha Abbo; 2 May 1980 (age 46)
- Party: African Democratic Congress (ADC)
- Profession: Politician
- Nickname: SIA

Ishaku Elisha Abbo (born 5 February 1980) is a Nigerian politician. He represented Adamawa North Senatorial District in the 9th and 10th Senate until the Court of Appeal on 16 October 2023 reassigned his mandate to Amos Yohanna of the PDP. Abbo was first elected to the Nigerian Senate in 2019 under the People’s Democratic Party (PDP). In 2020, he defected to the All Progressives Congress (APC).

In 2025 he left the APC and joined the growing and powerful opposition party African Democratic Congress (ADC). Ishaiku E. Abbo is the flag beerer of Labour Party in Adamawa state for 2027 election

== Early life and education ==
Ishaku Abbo was born on 5 February 1980 in the village of Gova, Muchalla Ward, Mubi North Local Government Area of Adamawa State. He grew up in Adamawa and was exposed to socio-economic challenges from an early age, shaping his interest in public service and politics. Abbo obtained a Bachelor’s degree in Public Administration and a Master’s degree in International Relations and Diplomacy. He is also pursuing a Master’s in Security and Strategic Studies at Nasarawa State University, Keffi. Before entering politics, he was involved in business and social advocacy, focusing on youth empowerment and community development.

== Career ==
Before entering politics, he was involved in business and social advocacy, focusing on youth empowerment and community development.

=== Political career ===
Ishaku Abbo was elected to the Senate in 2019 representing Adamawa North under the Peoples Democratic Party (PDP). He defected to the All Progressives Congress (APC) in November 2020. During the 9th Senate from 2019 to 2023, he served as the Vice Chairman of the Senate Committee on Navy and as the Chairman of the Senate Committee on Primary Health Care. He also held membership on several other committees, including those for Poverty Alleviation & Social Investment Programme, Special Duties, Interior, Defence, Agriculture, Budget & National Planning, Youth & Sport, and Trade & Investment.

Upon his re-election in 2023 for the 10th senate, he was appointed Chairman of the Senate Committee on Tourism and Entertainment Economy. His additional committee memberships in the 10th Senate include Works, Gas, Solid Minerals, Finance, Army, Air Force, Defence, Police, Appropriation, Agriculture & Rural Development, Tertiary Institutions & TETFUND, Water Resources, Banking, Communications, Special Duties, and Environment.

During his tenure, Abbo sponsored and co-sponsored a number of bills and motions. His legislative proposals included the Creative Economy Commission Bill of 2023, which sought to establish a commission to promote the country's creative industries. In 2022, he sponsored the Police Pension Board Bill, aimed at creating a separate pension board for police officers, and the National Geriatric & Family Hospital, Mubi Bill, for a federal hospital specializing in elder care. Earlier, in 2020, he sponsored the Federal College of Nursing and Midwifery, Muchalla, Mubi Bill to establish a federal health training institution.Former lawmaker representing Adamawa North Senatorial District in the 9th Assembly, Senator Ishaku Abbo, has resigned his membership of the African Democratic Congress. Ex-lawmaker, Senator Ishaku Abbo has emerged as the governorship candidate of the Labour Party (LP for the 2027 general elections in Adamawa State.

== Controversy and allegations ==
=== Adult Toy Shop Assault case ===
In July 2019, a widely circulated CCTV video showed Abbo assaulting a woman at an adult toy shop in Abuja. He was subsequently charged with criminal assault. In September 2020, a High Court in Abuja found him guilty and ordered him to pay ₦50 million in compensation to the victim, but did not impose a custodial sentence.

=== Arrest by Anti-Corruption Agencies ===
In October 2023, the Independent Corrupt Practices and Other Related Offences Commission (ICPC) arrested and detained him. The ICPC alleged he had misused his office by petitioning the commission to investigate a political rival, former Adamawa State Governor Murtala Nyako, for matters unrelated to his senatorial duties. The agency stated this constituted a "gross violation" of the Corrupt Practices Act and accused him of attempting to use the ICPC for political vendettas. He was later granted administrative bail.

=== Rape Allegation ===
In September 2025, the Nigeria Police Force began investigating Senator Ishaku Abbo following an allegation of rape and sexual assault made by a minor of 13 years old. The complaint, filed with the office of the Inspector General of Police, stated the incident occurred at the senator's residence in Abuja on June 29, 2025. The police investigation was conducted by the Force Criminal Investigation Department (FCID). On October 23, 2025, the police concluded their investigation. The official report stated that investigators could not establish the essential elements of the alleged offenses including rape, defilement, and conspiracy citing a lack of credible evidence. The police report noted that the nearly three-month gap between the alleged incident and the formal report hindered the investigation. Despite clearing Abbo, the report recommended the case file be forwarded to the Legal and Prosecution Department for review and potential court action to address public interest.

== Awards and recognition ==
Abbo has received several humanitarian and religious awards, including dual honours from the Non-Denominational Christian Choir Association of Nigeria (Adamawa State, 2024) and recognition from the Baptist College of Theology, Jos. He was also named a patron of the North East Christian Gospel Singers for his contributions to community service and youth engagement.

== Personal life ==
Abbo is a devout Christian and is actively involved in gospel and church activities. In June 2024, he was conferred the title Patron of the North East Christian Gospel Singers (“New Life for All Gospel Singers”) during their yearly singing event at Deeper Life Campground, Yola, attended by Christian youths from the six north-eastern states. He delivered a sermon on the theme “Why the righteous must participate in politics.”

He has also been honoured for humanitarian service and evangelism by Christian bodies such as the Non-Denominational Christian Choir Association of Nigeria and the Baptist College of Theology, Jos.

In December 2024, Abbo was invited as a guest to the Annual Harvest & Thanksgiving Service of Emmanuel Lutheran Church, Yola, themed “Harvest of Favour.”
