= 1992 Nigerian Senate elections in Adamawa State =

1992 Nigerian Senate election in Adamawa State

The 1992 Nigerian Senate election in Adamawa State was held on July 4, 1992, to elect members of the Nigerian Senate to represent Adamawa State. Paul Wampana Vimtim representing Adamawa North, Hamman Bello Mohammed representing Adamawa Central and Manasa T. B. Daniel representing Adamawa South all won on the platform of the National Republican Convention.

== Overview ==
Affiliation	Party		Total
Affiliation	SDP	NRC	Total
Before Election			3
After Election	0	3	3

== Summary ==
District	Incumbent	Party	Elected Senator	Party
Adamawa North			Paul Wampana Vimtim	NRC
Adamawa Central			Hamman Bello Mohammed	NRC
Adamawa South			Manasa T. B. Daniel	NRC

== Results ==
=== Adamawa North ===
The election was won by Paul Wampana Vimtim of the National Republican Convention.

1992 Nigerian Senate election in Adamawa State
Party	Candidate	Votes	%
NRC	Paul Wampana Vimtim		
Total votes			
NRC hold			

=== Adamawa Central ===
The election was won by Hamman Bello Mohammed of the National Republican Convention.

1992 Nigerian Senate election in Adamawa State
Party	Candidate	Votes	%
NRC	Hamman Bello Mohammed		
Total votes			
NRC hold			

=== Adamawa South ===
The election was won by Manasa T. B. Daniel of the National Republican Convention.

1992 Nigerian Senate election in Adamawa State
Party	Candidate	Votes	%
NRC	Manasa T. B. Daniel		
Total votes			
NRC hold			
