= Mohammed Mana =

Nigerian politician (1950–2025)

Brigadier General Mohammed Mana

Senator of the Federal Republic of Nigeria from Adamawa State North District
- In office 29 May 2007 – May 2011
- Preceded by: Abubakar Iya
- Succeeded by: Bindo Jibrilla
- Constituency: Adamawa South

Military Governor of Plateau State
- In office 9 December 1993 – 22 August 1996
- Preceded by: Fidelis Tapgun
- Succeeded by: Habibu Idris Shuaibu

Personal details
- Born: 7 October 1950
- Died: 22 August 2025 (aged 74) Abuja, Nigeria
- Party: People's Democratic Party

Military service
- Allegiance: Nigeria
- Branch: Nigerian Army
- Rank: Brigadier General
- Commands: Plateau State

Mohammed Mana (7 October 1950 – 22 August 2025) was a Nigerian military Administrator of Plateau State between December 1993 and August 1996 during the military regime of General Sani Abacha. He was elected Senator for Adamawa North in 2007 on the People's Democratic Party (PDP) platform.

== Background ==
Mana was born on 7 October 1950. He attended the Government College, Keffi. He obtained a diploma in Petroleum Technology from the US Army Quartermaster School in 1976. In 1987, he obtained a diploma in Public Administration from Ahmadu Bello University, Zaria.

Mana died on 22 August 2025, at the age of 74.

== Military career ==
As Governor of Plateau State, in 1994, Lt. Col. Mohammed Mana set up a commission to look into the inter-ethnic conflict in Jos. The problems were due to friction between the Berom, Anaguta, and Afizere tribes on the one hand, and the Hausa-Fulani tribes on the other hand. Riots had been triggered by Mana's appointment of a Hausa man as "caretaker Committee chairman" of Jos.

Mana retired from the military in June 1999 when President Olusegun Obasanjo decreed that all former military administrators must retire.

== Civilian career ==
After becoming Senator in May 2007, Mana was appointed to committees on Selection, Power, Integration, and Cooperation. He was also appointed deputy chief whip of the Senate. He sponsored an Amendment Bill on Border Areas Development Commission, 2009 and a Bill for an Act on Tobacco Control, 2009. Talking in March 2009 on the Electoral Reform report of the committee headed by Justice Mohammed Uwais, he recommended that the head of the Independent National Electoral Commission be appointed by the executive, but subject to judicial review.

After the February 2010 coup in Niger, the senate President David Mark asked Mohammed Mana and Senator John Shagaya of Plateau State to use their close ties with the new military leaders of Niger to urge them to embrace democracy. In March 2010, Mana was appointed to a 20-man committee to find ways to permanently solve the Jos crisis, where there had been endemic violence between Muslims and Christians.

In the run-up to the 9 April 2011 national elections, Mana was a contender in the PDP primaries to again be Senatorial candidate for Adamawa North. However, he lost the nomination.

Mana filed an appeal against the selection of Umar Bindo Jibrilla as the candidate for Adamawa North. On 29 March 2011, a Federal High Court in Abuja dismissed the appeal as lacking in merit. Mana appealed this ruling. An early report of the Adamawa North Senatorial election results said that Bindo Jibrilla (PDP) defeated former governor Boni Haruna of the Action Congress of Nigeria (ACN), polling 75,112 votes to Haruna's 70,890 votes. The Congress for Progressive Change (CPC) candidate, Abba Mohammed, scored 22,866. This result was also reported by the Independent National Electoral Commission (INEC) as of 16 April. However, by 23 April, the Nigeria Elections Coalition was reporting that Mana was the winning PDP candidate.
