= Iya Abubakar =

Nigerian mathematician and statesman

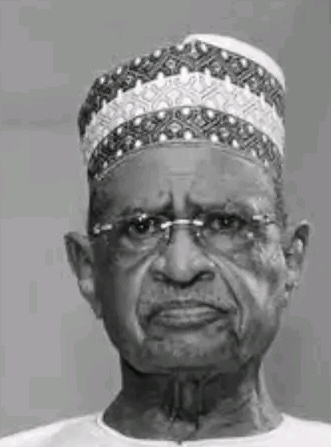

Senator from Adamawa North
- In office May 1999 – May 2007
- Preceded by: Paul Wampana
- Succeeded by: Mohammed Mana
- Constituency: Adamawa North

Federal Minister of Internal Affairs
- In office 1981–1982
- President: Shehu Shagari
- Preceded by: Maitama Bello Yusuf
- Succeeded by: Ali Baba

Federal Minister of Defence
- In office 24 October 1979 – January 1981
- President: Shehu Shagari
- Preceded by: Olusegun Obasanjo
- Succeeded by: Akanbi Oniyangi

Director, Central Bank of Nigeria (CBN)
- In office 1972–1975

Personal details
- Born: Iya Abubakar Belel; 14 December 1934 (age 91) Belel, Northern Cameroons (now in Adamawa State, Nigeria)
- Party: Peoples Democratic Party (since 1999)
- Other political affiliations: National Party of Nigeria (1979–1983)
- Education: University of Ibadan
- Profession: Mathematician, professor, politician

Iya Abubakar (born 14 December 1934) is a Nigerian politician and mathematician who held multiple cabinet level appointments (Minister of Defence and Minister of Internal Affairs) during the Nigerian Second Republic, and Senator for Adamawa North from May 1999 to May 2007.

== Birth and academic career ==
Iya Abubakar was born in Belel, British Cameroon (now in Adamawa State, Nigeria), on December 14, 1934. He attended Yola Middle School (now General Murtala Mohammed College), Government College (now Barewa College) in Zaria, and the Nigerian College of Technology, also in Zaria. He achieved a first class honors degree in Mathematics at the University College, Ibadan (now University of Ibadan), before he went to England for postgraduate studies at Cambridge University in 1958. In 1960, he conducted research at the Pasadena Seismological Laboratory in the United States for a year. A year later, he was awarded a Ph.D. in applied mathematics and theoretical physics from Cambridge University, becoming the first person from the Northern region of Nigeria to receive this degree.

He worked as a visiting professor at the University of Michigan in 1965–66, before being appointed as professor of mathematics at Ahmadu Bello University at the age of 28, in 1967. He held this position until 1975, as well as a visiting professorship at the City University of New York from 1971 to 1972. In 1975, he was appointed the vice-chancellor of Ahmadu Bello University, a position he held until 1978. However, following the Ali Must Go student protests of 1978, the Supreme Military Council forced him to resign from his position.

Abubakar was a director of the Central Bank of Nigeria from 1972 to 1975.

== Political career ==
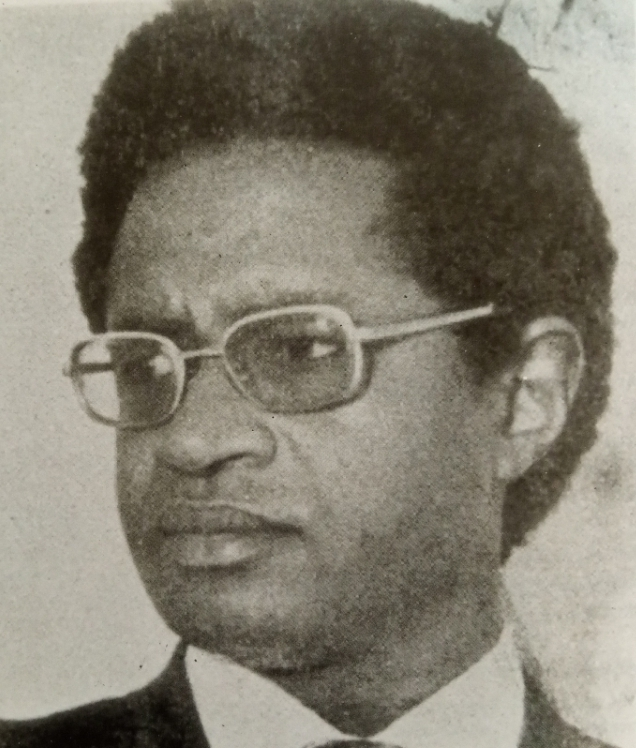

After the military government relinquished power in 1979, kickstarting the Nigerian Second Republic, Abubakar joined the National Party of Nigeria (NPN) in 1978, and was appointed National Vice Chairman representing Gongola State.

After Shehu Shagari, the NPN candidate, won the 1979 presidential election, Abubakar served in Shagari's cabinet as Minister of Defence. In May 1980, in response to South Africa's rumored nuclear weapons activities, he stated that "as long as the protagonists of apartheid have access to nuclear capability, Nigeria should, of necessity, endeavor to acquire it at any price."

In January 1981, Akanbi Oniyangi succeeded him as Defence Minister. However, he was reinstated as Minister of Internal Affairs by Shagari.

From 1993 to 2005, Abubakar was the Pro-Chancellor and Chairman of Council of the University of Ibadan. In the late 1990s, he served as director of the National Mathematical Centre at Abuja and chaired both the National Manpower Commission of Nigeria and the non-governmental Africa International Foundation for Science and Technology.

Abubakar was elected Senator for the Adamawa North constituency of Adamawa State, Nigeria at the start of the Nigerian Fourth Republic, running on the People's Democratic Party (PDP) platform. He took office on 29 May 1999. He was reelected in April 2003. After taking his seat in the Senate in June 1999 he was appointed to committees on Public Accounts, Banking & Currency (chairman), Commerce and Finance & Appropriation. Abubakar has also chaired the Senate Committee on Finance and Appropriation and the Senate Committee on Science and Technology.

== Bibliography ==
- Abubakar, Iya (1961). "Disturbance due to a line source in a semi-infinite transversely isotropic elastic medium". Geophysical Journal. 6 (3): 337–359. Bibcode:1962GeoJ....6..337A. doi:10.1111/j.1365-246X.1962.tb00356.x.
- Abubakar, Iya (1962). "Motion of the surface of a transversely isotropic half-space excited by a buried line source". Geophysical Journal. 7 (1): 87–101. Bibcode:1962GeoJ....7...87A. doi:10.1111/j.1365-246X.1962.tb02254.x.
- Abubakar, Iya (1962). "Free vibrations of a transversely isotropic plate". Q. J. Mech. Appl. Math. 15: 129–136. doi:10.1093/qjmam/15.1.129.
- Abubakar, Iya (1962). "Scattering of plane elastic waves at rough surfaces. I". Proc. Cambridge Philos. Soc. 58 (1): 136–157. Bibcode:1962PCPS...58..136A. doi:10.1017/S030500410003629X. S2CID 119683267.
- Abubakar, Iya (1963). "Scattering of plane elastic waves at rough surfaces. II". Proc. Cambridge Philos. Soc. 59 (1): 231–248. Bibcode:1963PCPS...59..231A. doi:10.1017/S0305004100002176. S2CID 251097465.
