= Grace Folashade Bent =

Nigerian politician

Senator for Adamawa South
- In office May 2007 – May 2011
- Preceded by: Jonathan Zwingina
- Succeeded by: Ahmed Hassan Barata

Personal details
- Born: 25 October 1960 (age 65)
- Party: All Progressives Congress (Nigeria) All Progressives Congress (APC)
- Spouse: Jackson Bent
- Education: BA (English & Literary Studies), M. Sc (Political Science & International Relations), University of Calabar, Nigeria, PhD (Public Administration), Indiana State University, United States
- Profession: Politician

Grace Folashade Bent née Makinwa (born 25 October 1960) is a Nigerian senator who was elected in April 2007 on the People's Democratic Party platform in the Adamawa South constituency of Adamawa State.

== Background ==
Grace Folashade Bent was born in 1960. She attended Ilesa Grammar School (Graduate Class of 1978). At the University of Calabar she was a students' union activist. She received a BA (Hons) in English and Literary Studies in 1998, and an MSc in Political Science and International Relations in 2003. She has a doctorate of Public Administration from Indiana State University, United States. Before entering the senate, Grace Folashade Bent was political adviser to the PDP National Chairman, Audu Ogbeh, Assistant Producer, NTA Kaduna, and managing director of Jack Ventures Nigeria. She has published a book titled Women in Inter Ethnic Marriages in Nigeria.

According to some sources, Grace Folashade Bent was involved in obtaining fake degrees.

== Career ==
After election in 2007 Grace Folashade Bent became chair of the Nigerian Senate Committee on Environment. In this role, she was involved in controversy over an extension of permission for gas flaring granted to oil companies by president Umaru Yar'Adua without consultation with the Senate.

In April 2008, following a visit to South Africa, Senator Bent sponsored a motion to issue a travel advice to all Nigerians traveling to South Africa to be wary of incessant attacks.

In March 2009, Senator Bent opposed the establishment of a Desert Control Commission on the basis that this would subsume or duplicate the functions of the national committee on ecological problems. The senate whip, Mahmud Kanti Bello, cautioned her not to drag the public hearing over the proposed commission into "undue arguments".

In September 2009, Grace Folashade Bent wrote a formal letter to Minister of the Federal Capital Territory (FCT), Senator Mohammed Adamu Aliero, protesting the excessive felling of trees for road construction.

Bent competed in the PDP primaries to be the April 2011 candidate for Adamawa South Senator, but lost to Ahmed Hassan Barata. He received 738 votes to her 406 votes. Bent, who was said to have been favored by the PDP party leadership, later claimed that she had won a rerun primary. While the question was being reviewed, a judge ordered the Independent National Electoral Commission (INEC) to remove Barata's name from the list of candidates and replace it with Bent. Bent's claim was later rejected by the INEC, by the Federal High Court, Abuja and by the PDP's counsel. She speaks Yoruba language, including the Ijesa dialect.

=== Politics ===
Grace Folashade Bent called on the chairman of the state chapter of the Peoples Democracy Party (PDP), Barr. A.T Shehu, for calling her a non-indigene of Adamawa State, describing his action as exhibition of "crass ignorance" of law. She wondered why a trained lawyer like the Adamawa PDP chairman will resort to what she called outright

"lies" for the purpose of tarnishing her image and turning the good people of Adamawa against her. Grace Bent was nominated as an Ambassador by President Bola Tinubu.
