= Abdul-Aziz Nyako =

Nigerian politician

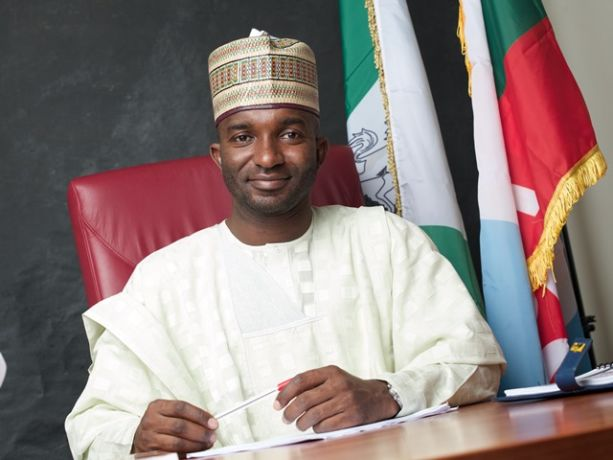

Senator of Adamawa Central
- In office 6 June 2015 – 2019 Serving with Binta Garba; Ahmad Abubakar
- Preceded by: Bello Tukur
- Succeeded by: Aishatu Dahiru Ahmed

Personal details
- Born: Abdul-Aziz Murtala Nyako; 19 December 1970 (age 55) Adamawa state, Nigeria
- Party: African Democratic Congress
- Education: Nigerian Defence Academy (BSc); Britannia Royal Naval College, Dartmonth, UK
- Profession: Retired Commander of the Nigerian Navy; Businessman politician

Abdul-Aziz Murtala Nyako (born 19 December 1970) is a Nigerian senator who represents Adamawa central in the 8th National Assembly. He is the chairman of the Special Duties Committee of the Nigerian senate.

Nyako was elected as a senator into the 8th National Assembly under the All Progressives Congress (APC) but later decamped to the African Democratic Congress to contest as governor for Adamawa. He is the son of the former governor of Adamawa state, Murtala Nyako.

Adamawa central Senatorial District covers seven local government areas.
