= Ahmad Abubakar =

Nigerian politician

Senator of the Federal Republic of Nigeria representing Adamawa South
- Incumbent
- Assumed office 6 June 2015 Serving with Binta Garba; Abdul-Aziz Nyako
- Preceded by: Barata Ahmed Hassan
- Succeeded by: Yaroe Binos Dauda

Personal details
- Born: Ahmad Moallahyidi Abubakar; 5 September 1957 (age 68) Ganye, Adamawa state, Nigeria
- Party: All Progressives Congress
- Education: North East College of Agricultural Science in Maiduguri; Ahmadu Bello University, Zaria
- Profession: Businessman politician

Ahmad Moallahyidi Abubakar (born 25 June 1957) is a Senator of the Federal Republic of Nigeria from Adamawa State. He represents Adamawa south in the current 8th National Assembly. Senator Ahmad Abubakar is the vice-chairman, Culture and Tourism Committee and also Gas Committee of the 8th National Assembly.

Nyako was elected as a senator into the 8th National Assembly under the All Progressives Congress (APC).

Adamawa south Senatorial District covers seven local government areas.

== Early life ==
Abubakar started his primary education at Ganye 1 Primary School Ganye and completed it in 1975 before proceeding to North East College of Agricultural Science in Maiduguri and later proceeded to Ahmadu Bello University for both his Bachelors and master's degrees.

== Political career ==
Abubakar, won the 2015 Adamawa South Senatorial polls on the platform of the All Progressives Congress to emerge as the senator of the district.
