= Jonathan Zwingina =

Nigerian politician (1953 or 1954 – 2024)

Jonathan Silas Zwingina

Senator for Adamawa South
- In office May 1999 – May 2007
- Succeeded by: Grace Folashade Bent

Personal details
- Born: 1953 or 1954 Adamawa State, Nigeria
- Died: 2 October 2024 (aged 70)

Jonathan Silas Zwingina (1953 or 1954 – 2 October 2024) was a Nigerian politician who was elected Senator for the Adamawa South constituency of Adamawa State, Nigeria at the start of the Nigerian Fourth Republic, running on the People's Democratic Party (PDP) platform. He took office on 29 May 1999. He was reelected in April 2003, again on the PDP platform.

After taking his seat in the Senate in June 1999, he was appointed to committees on Works & Housing (chairman), Establishment, Internal Affairs, Information, Special Projects, Privatization and Economic Affairs. Zwingina's palatial residence in Abuja was demolished in February 2007, allegedly on the orders of Nasir el-Rufai, the Federal Capital Territory Minister.

In September 2003, Nasir el-Rufai, alleged that Deputy Senate President Ibrahim Mantu and Zwingina, at the time Senate Majority Leader, asked him for a bribe of N54 million (US$418,000) to secure approval for his appointment as minister. Zwingina said that he was "shocked and horrified" by the accusations and that el-Rufai "is a pathological liar."

Zwingina was the chairman of the board of trustees of Save Democracy Group Africa. He died on 2 October 2024, at the age of 70.
