= Girei =

- Town and local government area
- Interactive map of Girei
- Location within Nigeria
- Coordinates: 9°22′N 12°33′E
- Country: Nigeria
- State: Adamawa State

Area
  - Total: 1,040 km^{2} (400 sq mi)

Population (2022)
  - Total: 200,200
  - Density: 192/km^{2} (499/sq mi)
- Time zone: UTC+1 (WAT)

Girei is a town and local government area of Adamawa State, Nigeria. It lies on the Benue River. The dominant tribe in the area are the Fulɓe or Fulani; however, a substantial number of Bwatiye also dwell in villages such as Greng and Labondo within the Girei local government area. The primary occupation of the people in the area is farming and cattle rearing. Girei is also a home to Radio Gotel.

== Demography ==
In a 2023 demographic survey of Internally displaced persons (IDPs), the most predominant languages (spoken at homes and places of primary residence) present in the local government area were; Fulfulde, specifically Eastern or Adamawa Fulfulde – 52.0%, Hausa – 36.6%, Marghi – 5.9%, Kamwe – 3.1%, Bachama/Bwatiye – 1.2%, Kilba/South Marghi – 0.6%, and Dera (Kanakuru) – 0.6%. This data was not obtained from a nationally co-ordinated population headcount. The last time Nigeria included ethnic and linguistic data in its enumeration parameters was in the national census of 1963.

== Climate ==
In Girei, the dry season is oppressively hot and partially cloudy, and the wet season is oppressively hot and humid. The average annual temperature ranges from 17 to 39 °C (62 to 102 °F), rarely falling below 13 °C (56 °F) or rising over 42 °C (108 °F).

=== Girei's typical hot temperature ===
From February 26 to April 26 is the hot season, which has an average daily high temperature of over 99 °F. With an average high of 100 °F and low of 80 °F, April is the hottest month of the year in Girei.

=== Girei's typical cool temperature ===
The 3.3-month cool season, which runs from June 23 to October 1, has an average daily maximum temperature of less than 90 °F. Girei experiences its coldest month of the year in January, with an average high of 91 °F and low of 63 °F.

=== Girei's Cloud ===
Agaie's annual average for the proportion of the sky that is covered in clouds varies significantly by season.

Around November 6 marks the start of Agaie's clearer season, which lasts for 3.5 months and ends around February 21.

In Agaie, December is the clearest month of the year, with the sky remaining clear, mostly clear, or partly overcast 55% of the time.

Beginning at February 21 and lasting for 8.5 months, the cloudier period of the year ends around November 6.

May is the cloudiest month of the year in Agaie, with the sky being overcast or mostly cloudy 82% of the time on average during this month.

== Pollution ==
In excess of 3,000 individuals have been uprooted across Jabilamba people group and environs in Girei LGA, following extreme blaze flooding from weighty storms somewhere in the range of 18 and 19 August. As per SEMA, something like 10 occupants were killed and three others injured in the blaze flooding that additionally harmed or annihilated many homes, basic offices and vocations across the impacted regions.

Sources have announced the appearance of a portion of the uprooted families in adjoining Tune and Yola LGAs starting around 22 August, while many homes stay lowered across the impacted regions and most occupants unfit to get back to rescue property and resources.

Girei LGA is one of the significant cholera areas of interest in Adamawa State and the defilement of water sources by the floodwater has uplifted the dangers of waterborne sicknesses across the impacted regions.

Notwithstanding, unverified reports from Girei showed that the town is totally abandoned after the flooding, decimation of vocations and progressing food deficiencies because of the lean season.

== History ==
In 1853, Lamido Muhammad Lawal led a decisive expedition against the formidable Bata of Bagale, a group that had staunchly resisted previous Fulbe attacks during Modibbo Adama's rule. The Bata were known for raiding traders along a critical trade route passing through their region, disrupting the flow of essential caravans that required military escorts. The Fulbe also critically needed farmlands and grazing areas at the time which made the Bagale area highly important to Lamido Lawal due to its fertile land which was suitable for both farming and grazing.

According to German explorer Heinrich Barth the Bata of Bagale "protected by the inaccessible character of their strongholds, and their formidable double spears, have not only been able hitherto to repulse all attacks' which the Fulbe had been making against them, but descending from their haunts, commit almost daily depredations upon the cattle of their enemies."

Previous attempts to conquer Bagale through two expeditions had failed, as Yola's forces heavily relied on cavalry tactics that proved ineffective in the region's mountainous terrain. However, Lamido Lawal was determined to achieve success and prepared for a prolonged siege, founding Girei as a base for the long siege. After an intense two-month-long siege, Bagale was finally overcome. Oral tradition highlights the role of a Bagale woman seeking vengeance against Geloye, the chief of Bagale, who had abducted her daughter. This woman guided the Yola forces under the cover of darkness to Geloye's location. During this covert operation, Geloye was killed, and the stronghold was razed to the ground.

With the Bata's influence subdued, the region saw an increase in grazing activity by Fulbe nomads and the establishment of Fulbe settlements. Lamido Lawal appointed Lawan Dan Goba to oversee the inhabitants of the plains north of the Benue River, giving him significant authority. During the latter part of Lamido Lawal's reign, Girei gained prominence as a hub for scholars who had migrated to Fombina from various parts of the Sokoto Caliphate. This gathering of scholars contributed to the intellectual and cultural growth of the area.

== Education ==
Girei is a major educational hub in Adamawa State, hosting several prominent tertiary institutions. It is the location of the Modibbo Adama University (formerly MAUTECH), which draws students from across Northern Nigeria. The town also hosts the Adamawa State Polytechnic, which provides technical and vocational training.

== Economy ==
The economy of Girei is primarily agrarian, with a focus on farming and cattle rearing. The fertile land along the Benue River supports the cultivation of crops such as maize, guinea corn, and groundnuts. The Local Government Area is also home to "Radio Gotel", a prominent radio station in the region founded by former Vice President Atiku Abubakar.

== Notable people ==
- Abubakar Girei (born 1954), Senator for Adamawa Central (1999–2003).
- Ahmed Joda, administrator and federal permanent secretary.
