= Adamawa languages =

Language family in Central Africa

Adamawa
- (defunct)
- Geographic distribution: Northern Cameroon, north-western Central African Republic, southern Chad, and eastern Nigeria
- Linguistic classification: Niger–Congo?: Atlantic–Congo; Adamawa–Ubangi; Adamawa
- Subdivisions: Tula–Waja; Leko–Nimbari; Mbum–Day; Waja–Jen; Nyingwom; Oblo (?)

Language codes
- Glottolog: adam1259 (retired)

The Adamawa /ædəˈmɑːwə/ languages are a putative family of 80–90 languages scattered across the Adamawa Plateau in Central Africa, in northern Cameroon, north-western Central African Republic, southern Chad, and eastern Nigeria, spoken altogether by only one and a half million people (as of 1996). Joseph Greenberg classified them as one branch of the Adamawa–Ubangi family of Niger–Congo languages. They are among the least studied languages in Africa, and include many endangered languages; by far the largest is Mumuye, with 400,000 speakers. A couple of unclassified languages—notably Laal and Jalaa—are found along the fringes of the Adamawa area.

Geographically, the Adamawa languages lie near the location of the postulated Niger–Congo – Central Sudanic contact that may have given rise to the Atlantic–Congo family, and so may represent the central radiation of that family.

== Classification ==
Joseph Greenberg postulated the Adamawa languages as a part of Adamawa–Ubangian (then called Adamawa–Eastern), and divided them into 14 numbered groups. Group G3, Daka (or Dakoid), is now known to be a branch of Benue–Congo. The relationships of the other branches has undergone considerable revision.

There have also been recent attempts at computationally classifying the Adamawa languages.

=== Greenberg (1963) ===
Greenberg's 14 numbered Adamawa groups are:

Number	Group
G1	Tula–Waja
G2	Leko
G3	Daka
G4	Duru
G5	Mumuye–Yendang
G6	Mbum
G7	Bəna–Mboi (Yungur)
G8	Nyimwom (Kam)
G9	Bikwin–Jen
G10	Longuda
G11	Fali
G12	Nimbari
G13	Bua
G14	Kim

=== Boyd (1989) ===
Boyd (1989) added the Day language and classified them as follows:

- Adamawa
  - Leko–Nimbari (or Chamba–Mumuye)
    - Duru: G4
    - Leko: G2
    - Mumuye–Yendang: G5
    - Nimbari: G12
  - Mbum–Day
    - Bua: G13
    - Kim: G14
    - Mbum: G6
    - Day
  - Waja–Jen
    - Bikwin–Jen (or Jen): G9
    - Tula–Wiyaa (or Waja): G1
    - Bəna–Mboi (or Yungur): G7
    - Baa (a.k.a. Kwa)
    - Longuda: G10
  - Nyimwom (or Kam: G8)

He excluded the Fali languages (G11).

=== Güldemann (2018) ===
Güldemann (2018) recognises 14 coherent Adamawa "genealogical units", but is agnostic about their positions within Niger-Congo.

- Tula-Waja
- Longuda
- Bena-Mboi
- Bikwin-Jen
- Samba-Duru
- Mumuyic
- Maya (Yendangic)
- Kebi-Benue (Mbumic)
- Kimic
- Buaic
- Day
- Baa = Kwa
- Nyingwom = Kam
- Fali

=== Kleinewillinghöfer (2019) ===
Kleinewillinghöfer (2019), in the Adamawa Languages Project website, recognises the following 17 groups as Adamawa languages.

- Tula-Waja (Waja): G1
- Bikwin-Jen (Burak, Jen): G9
- Kam (Nyiŋɔm, Nyiwom, Nyingwom): G8
- Longuda (Nʋngʋra cluster): G10
- Baa (Kwa)
- Mumuye: G5
- Yandang (Yendang): G5
- Samba-Duru (Chamba-Leko, Leko, Duru, Sama-Duru, Samba Leeko): G2, G4
- Ɓəna-Mboi (Yungur): G7
- Kebi-Benue (Mbum): G6
- Kim: G14
- Day
- Bua: G13
- Nimbari (Baari, Bari): G12 [extinct]
- Duli - Gewe (Gey, Gueve) [extinct]
- ? Fali: G11
- ? Chamba-Daka (Daka): G3

Only the Tula-Waja, Longuda, Ɓəna-Mboi, Samba-Duru, and Bua groups have noun classes. The other groups only display vestiges of formerly active noun class systems.

=== Blench (2012, 2020) ===
Roger Blench (2012) concludes that the Adamawa languages are a geographic grouping, not a language family, and breaks up its various branches in his proposed Savannas family. He places some of the western Adamawa languages closer to the Gur languages than to other Adamawa families. Fali is tentatively excluded from Savannas altogether. Blench (2020) retains a connection between Mumuye and Yendang, but breaks up Kleinewillinghöfer's Samba-Duru.

== Unclassified Adamawa languages ==
The Oblo language of Cameroon has been included in several versions of the Adamawa group, but its position within it is unclear.

It has been speculated that the unclassified Laal language of Chad may be Adamawa; the Jalaa language of Nigeria is probably not Adamawa, but shows heavy Adamawa influence. However, both are generally now considered to be language isolates.

== Comparative vocabulary ==
Sample basic vocabulary of Adamawa languages from Kleinewillinghöfer's Adamawa Languages Project website and various other sources:

Note: In table cells with slashes, the singular form is given before the slash, while the plural form follows the slash.

Classification	Language	Dialect	eye	ear	nose	tooth	tongue	mouth	blood	bone	water	tree	eat	name
Baa	Baa		nu(ví) / rínù	ǹtú / ríǹtú	gyo̰ / rigyó̰	nyanwívì / rí-	dyḛǹ(vì)	nyààvì	twèèn	kukút	mán	kii / rikii	gyâ	zin
Bikwin-Jen	Proto-Jen (Proto-Bikwin-Jen)		*núŋ	*tswi	*lúr(i)	*le	*ɗək; (*lyəN)	*ɲwa	*ɥe/*zwi	*kub	*kəb	*mɛ/*mɨŋ	*tə́ŋ	*lɨn/*ɗwín
Bikwin-Jen	Burak (Ɓʊʊrak)		núŋ	twíi ?	lúúri	lée	ɗá̰k	nyúwaa, nywaa	wɪ́ɪ́	kúb, kúp ?	mɛ́ɛ́	ɗít / yéɗit	tá̰ŋ	lín̄
Bikwin-Jen	Loo (Shʊŋɔ)	Galdemaru	ɛrɛ nuŋ	twɪ́ɪ́	lúúrì	lei	ɗak	nywa	dùm	kúp	mɛ́ɛ́	ɗít	táŋ	nin
Bikwin-Jen	Loo (Shʊŋɔ)	Waamura	ɛrɛ nuŋ	twɪ́ɪ́	lúúrì	lei	ɗak	nywa	dùm	kúp	mɛ́ɛ́	káp	táŋ	nin
Bikwin-Jen	Maɣdi (Tala)		núŋ / yéénuŋ	cwéé	luuli	léí	ɗák	nyuwaa	ywee	kób, kúób / yéé kób	míshì	káp / yéékáp	taŋ	lin
Bikwin-Jen	Lee Mak	Panya	nuŋ	dɔkswíì	ɗuurə	lei	lén	nuwaa	lyüé	kóp	mui kya	kap / yeekâp	táŋ	ɗín
Bikwin-Jen	Lee Mak	Zoo	nuŋ	(ɗɔ́k)shwìyè	ɗuurə	lei	lén	nuwa	lyüé	kúóp	mwui kya	kàp	táŋ	ɗin
Bikwin-Jen	Kya̰k (Bambuka)		núŋ	ɗɔ́kswì	ɗúr	lɛ́ɛ́	ɗyím	ŋwaà	zwìì	kəkəp	mùŋ	káp	táŋ	ɗwín
Bikwin-Jen	Mɔɔ (Gomu)		nə́ŋ	ɗɔ́kfíì	ɗúr	lɛ́ɛ́	ɗyík	ŋwaa	zìì	kúp	mùŋ kwâm	kaap	taŋ	ɗwín
Bikwin-Jen	LeeLau (Munga, Munga Leelau)		núŋ	ɗɔkswî	ɗurr, ndurr	léí	lyén	ŋwaà	zìì	kukup; (kʊkʊp ?)	munki	kâp	tâŋ	ɗún
Bikwin-Jen	Dza (Jen)	Kaigama	nə́ŋ	tshwötshwí	bwaadjwí	djìì	lʌ̰́	nnwâ	hywṵi, hywḭ	kʊʊkʊ́, kʊkʊ́	mmə́ŋ	kɐ́ɐ / ekʌ́(ʌ)	táŋ, tháŋ	djwuŋ
Bikwin-Jen	Munga (Məngaŋ) Doso		nəŋ	cúcwì	kádwì	íì	lyêm	ŋwàà	ehywü; (exwü)	kúkwə̀	məŋ tsər	kaa / lékaa	tâŋ	ɗyíìŋ
Bikwin-Jen	Joole		nə́ŋ / ee-	tʃwü tʃwí	nwá̰ dwí	jì(ì) (calabash)	lʌ́	ká̰ nw̰á̰	hṵ̈̀ḭ̀	kùkú	mə́ŋ	kʌ́ / èèkʌ́	táŋ	dzuŋ
Bikwin-Jen	Jòòle	Joole Manga	bwàà nù	bwaa tywi	bwàà dṵ̀	gigi	láŋ	kányua	vi (?)	kúkú	míkyá	nyááká / nyááká búbáí	tà̰à̰	dumà
Tula-Waja	Wɪya, Waja, Wajan Kasa		nuŋè	twɪ́yaʊ	boocu	nwii	bɛnɛ	nɪyaʊ	tumà	kuu	gundù	sou	jɛ	dənè
Tula-Waja	Waja	Deeri, Wajan Dutse				gɔn niŋi				podou / podoru				
Tula-Waja	Kutule, Tula	Wange	kwalaŋɛ / kwalaŋi	kətɛ́ɛ́lɛ̀ / kətɛ́ɛ́lɪ	cʊʊn / cʊʊni	kunuwaŋ / nǔǔm, tunuri	ben / beni	yii / yiini	kʊtʊm	kətiyaŋ / tətiini	mwɛ̀ / mwɛti	tíyaŋ / tííní	cáú ~ ʃáú	dən / dimbi
Tula-Waja	Tula	Baule	nù / núl	kə̀tɛ́ɛ́lɛ̀ / kə̀tɛ́ɛ́lɪ̀	sʊ́ʊ́n / sʊ́ʊ́nɪ́, sʊ́ŋə́n	kə́núwáŋ / núúm, tə́núri	been / bééni	yí / yiiní	kʌtùùm	kətiyá námáŋ / tətiini náiyé	mwɛ̀	kətíyá / tətííní	saʊ; sa (mwàn)	də́n / də́mbí
Tula-Waja	Tula	Yili (Yiri)	nuù / nuuto	kətɛ́ɛ́lɪ / kətɛ́ɛ́nɪ́	ʃʊ́ʊ́l / ʃʊ́ʊ́wɪ̀	kunuuŋ / nuum	bííl / bííwí	yii / yiiní	kʊtʊʊ̀m	kukúkó / tukútó	mwɛ	tiyaŋ / tiini	caʊ̀; ca (mwân)	diń / dimən
Tula-Waja	Yebu, Awak		núŋí	bwaará	suur ~ sʊʊr	nuŋún	beén	nìí	tuum	kuukú	mwê; mwɛ̀	tii	sáb	duń
Tula-Waja	Baŋjiŋe, Bangwinji		nuwe / nuwetini	tuù / tuuní	ʃóór, cóór	nuǹ / nuǹtini	bien / bienni ?	nyii / nyiini	bwiyalɛ̀	kúk / kútí	mwɛ́m	tu / tum	câm	dén
Tula-Waja	Dadiya		nuu / nuutin	lɔɔ̀l	jʊl	núŋùn	ben	níyò / níyétìn	tʊ́ʊ́m	kuto	mwḛ̂	tiyà / tiyàntin	jáá	dùń
Tula-Waja	Maa, Kamo		núŋé	kúmó	cóór	nugun	bén̄	nyiyé	tʊ́ʊ́m	kúúbú	mwɛ́	nyáŋlá	dágʊ́m (wúrgé)	dìń
Tula-Waja	Dijim, Cham	Kindiyo	kʌmɪ / kámtɛ	suu; suwoŋ	jʊ̀r, jʊ̀ʊ̀r	nuŋun / nuŋtɛ́	lʌŋər / laŋtɛ́	nyʷii / nyʷiini	dʊ̀gʊ́m	kuk / kute	híí	riyaŋ / riitɛ	jau	dun / duntɛ̀
Tula-Waja	Bwilim, Cham	Mɔna	nu / nute	getuwaŋ / getuwai		taanù / taantɔ́ʊ́	bemnù / bemtou	nyii / nyiini			gə̀mí		záà	
Tula-Waja	Tso	Suwabou	nuŋ / nuntóú	wɔɔnʊ́ / wɔɔntáú	nyulóónù / nyulóóntù	nunu / núntòù	lameno / lamtʊ̀	nyii / nyiini	dɔɔ̀m	tsá / tseni	láà / laátóú	tsá / tsenì	za	dín / díntòù
Tula-Waja	Tso	Gusubo	nùŋ / nùntù	fə̀là / fə̀lààni	dətəmòròù / tə̀tə̀mòtòù	taanʊ̀ / taantú	béémnó / béémtóú	nyii / nyiini		tsá / tseni	la / latóú	tsá / tsénì	zaà	dín / díntú
Tula-Waja	Tso	Barbou							dʊ̀m	tsá / tsáni	yìbè / laátóú			
isolate	Jalaa		dyiríì / dyitə̂	buŋôŋ	yamə-r / yamə-ta	tənəm / tənemté̩	laŋe̩r / laŋté̩	bo̩o̩, bwo̩ / bo̩o̩-ní	bwiirùm	kùsì-gò̩ / -nìó	gwìì-ràŋ, gwìì-ròŋ / -tè̩	mwê̩	hâl	nuŋ kúlájí; kwáráŋ wò̩gə́n ?
Longuda	Cerii (Ceriŋ, Banjiram)		nyʊ̰lá / nyʊ̰ʔá	thʊ́lá / thwíyá	dɔ́ŋkhá / dɔ́ŋthá	gàràlá / gará	dhilimkha / dhilimtha	nyàkhá / nyàthá	thùmá	kwacalá / kwacáá	mámá	thíká / thímá	dhà	zííndé / zíné
Longuda	Deele (Jessu)		nyʊ̀ʊ̀là / nyʊ̀ʊ̀lʔà	tʊ́là / twáʔà	jɔ́ɔ́(ŋ)khà / jɔ́ɔ́(ŋ)thà	galáwa / galáhà	dhələ́mkhà	nyàkà	thʊ́mà; surmə̀	kukubə́lə̀ / kukubə́ʔə̀	mámà	thikhà	já, jáʔà	jááunla / jááunʔà
Longuda	Koola (Thaarʊ)		nyʊ̰lá	tʊ́lá / twáʔá	zɔɔŋkha	gàlàwá / gàlàhá	dələmka	nyalá / nyaʔá	tʊmá	tsakəbla / tsakəbʔa	mama	thíká	zà; zà nyoomò	dəmla / dəmʔá
Longuda	Wala Lunguda	Guyuk	nyuŋlá	thʊ́wá / thwáá	joonka	garala / garaʔa /	zilimkha	nyakhá	tumá, thuma	kwaca, kwacalá	mámá	thíkhá	jà	zindè / zinè
Longuda	Gwaanda (Nyuwar)		nyṵnla	zingala / zingaʔa	jɔ̰ŋka	nyile / nyiʔe	dhilimka	nyàkà / nyàthà	sirme	kwacala / kwacaʔa	mama, dwaama	waha̰ka / waha̰ma	dháà	dzaunla; dziiŋle
Longuda	Gwaanda		nyṵlà	dzíngálá	jónká	nyúlə́	dhílímká		súrmá, súrmé ?	kwàcàlà / kwàcàà	mámá, dwàmà	wàhàkà	dà; thà	dzínlə́
Bena-Mboi	Ɓəna (Yungur)	Dumne	núú / nṵ́ṵ́sâ	gwḛ́ḛ́ / gwḛ́ḛ́mé	tímrá / címtá	ɗə́fá / ɗə́mtá	ɗəlmaarà / ɗəlmaatà	ʔéé / ʔéémé	kẃadmá	tə́fá / tə́ptá	mbraá	ɓota / nbwece	kə́fə́	ɗənda / ɗənta
Bena-Mboi	Ɓəna (Yungur)	Pirambe	núú / nṵ́ṵ́śa	gwe / gweme	tímrá / tímtá	ɗə́mbá / ɗə́mtá	ɗəlmaarà / ɗəlmaatà	ʔḛḛ / ʔéémé	munma	tə́fá / tə́ptá	mbərá / mbəramsî	ɓota / nɓétè	kə́fə́	ɗənda / ɗənta
Bena-Mboi	Voro	Waltaandi	núú / núúza	gwḛ́ḛ́ / gwḛ́ḛ́mé	tímrá / tímtá	ɗə́mbá / ɗə́mtá	ɗəlḿáará / ɗəlḿáatá	ʔḛḛ / ʔḛ́ḛ́mé	kẃadmá, mùnmà	tə́fá / tə́ptá	mbráá [muwa ?]	ɓòtà / ŋbété	kə́fə́	ɗə́ndá / ɗə́ntá
Bena-Mboi	Voro	Ɓéttandi							kẃadmá	tə́fá / tə́ptá	mbra̰a̰	ɓòtà / ŋbété	kə́fə́	ɗə́ndá / ɗə́ntá
Bena-Mboi	Ɓəna (Laala)	Bodei (Bodwai)	nuú / nuujà	gwḛḛ / gwḛḛmé	timrá / timtá, timté	ɗəmbá / ɗəmtá	ɗə̀lmààrà / ɗə̀lmààtà	nyḛ́ḛ́ / nyḛ́ḛ́mé	bòblà / bòbjà	təpa / təutá	mbrá̰à̰ / mbráámjà	ɓotá / ngwaaté	jeè	ɗíndá / ɗíntá
Bena-Mboi	Ɓəna (Laala)	Yang	nuú / nùùzà	gwɛ̰ɛ̰ / gwɛ̰ɛ̰mé	tìmrá / tìmtí	ɗimbá / ɗimtá	ɗilmará / ɗilmaatá	ḛ̀yḛ́ / ḛ̀yḛ̀mé	mónmá	təfá / tòùtá	bərà̰à̰	ɓotá / ngwbaté	kəwə́	díndá / díntá
Bena-Mboi	Robma (Laala Roba)		nuu / nuuwà	gwee / gweemé	tìmrá / tìmtí	ɗimbá / ɗimtá	dilmará / dilmatá	ḛḛ́ / eḛ́msà	monma	təfá / təfáámse	bura / buráámsà	ɓotá / ngbaté	sewò	dinda / dinta
Bena-Mboi	Mboi	Gulungo				ɗəmbó / ɗìmda		aʔəhḛ	matəma			ngɔdɔ́ / angedé		ndià / ndiidà
Bena-Mboi	Mboi	Livo	núú / núúźa	tṵṵ̀ / tṵṵzà	ifiya / ifita	dúmbó / dimtà	lemiya / lemta	ahʔhi / ʔhimza	matəma	tutto / acicé	mbiya	ngɔ́tɔ́ / ángété	ʒé	ndíà / ndiità
Bena-Mboi	Mboi	Haanda	nuu / nuuzà	tuŋ / atʃw̄i	rifḛḛrà / rifḛḛtà	dúmbó / dimtà	leembərà / leemtà	ahʔhḭ̀ / mbai hímzà	mátə́má	túftò / atʃúfè	mbra	ŋbótó / aŋbécè	zé	ndera / ndərtata
Bena-Mboi	Kaan (Libo)		sunu / (sunuḿa)	twḭ / twiiḿa	shimbə́r / shimbətəmá	təmbər / təmbərmâ	ɗəlaamíì / ɗəlaamííʔóó	ʔii / ʔiim	morúm	təfəra / təfətəmá	barə̀m	mərə̂m / mərəməmá	zə́	ndə̀r / ndərmá
Yendang	Bali		ní	tɛ́	sɛ́	síbí	ŋwɛ́lɛ	ɲɛ́	míɗɛnɛ́	kṹɓí	tí	mí	mò[k]	lím
Yendang	Kpasham		núɛ̃́	wàswé	ɲɛ́swɛ́	síbí	ŋwɔ́le	ɲɛ́	mídwíne	kũ̀bi	sí	mí	mɔk	nə̌ŋ
Yendang	Yoti		dóo	tóo	sɔ́ɔ̃́	ʃúu	wúlɛ̀	ɲâ	dii	kúnwí	tí	mii	mòk	níŋ
Yendang	Yandang		nɔk	tòk	ɲánsũ	rùk	lɛka	ɲǎk	le	kún	dĩ̀hĩ̀	mí	mogí	inaŋ
Mumuye	Proto-Mumuye		*nu-ng, *nung; *gí-ǹg	*co-V, *coo	*su-ng, *sung	*tná-li/-ri	*ɗè-V/ng-ti	*nyaa	*kpa-V̀; *zing, *zi-ng	*ka (redup.), *kak-V	*mi-V, *mii, *min ?	*la-V, *laa	*caa	*ríǹg, *rí-ǹg
Mumuye	Mumuye (Zing)		nung	shoo	sung	tnári	rèétè	nyaa	kpaà	kaka	mee	laa	shaa	ríńg
Kam	Nyiŋɔm (Kam)	Din Kamaajin	ànùŋ	àkàr	àmə̀ràk	àshàg / àshàgìyo	àlímə́ní	ŋwé	wò	àkùb	mə̀ŋ káŋá	bàl / bàl yo	nìm; nəm níì (imp.)	
Vere	Jango		nɔ́ru / nɔ́ī	tóŋ / tónnun	míŋ; míŋ̄ / mínnùŋ	núúrù / núúi	mbéélu / mbéī	ndáŋ̄ / ndántun	kpa'arú / kpaˀatɛ́	rɛ́ndúkú / rɛ́ndɛ́	máŋ / mántúŋ	rák / ratú	rɛɛ kóp	ríírú / rííté
Vere	Jango (Southern)		nɔ́ru / nɔ́(t)tí		míŋ̄ / mínnùŋ	núúrù / núúyì	mbéélu / mbéétɛ́	ndáŋ̄ / ndántùŋ	kpààˀru / kpàˀɛ				rɛɛŋ	
Vere	Were		nǒrrō	tōn(g)	mi(n)(g)	nūī (pl.)	bēlō	dǎ(n)(g)	pǎrū		gaemām			
Vere	Batəm		nɔr / nɔˀ	tok / toˀ	míˀ / miin	núúr / núˀ	mɛ́ɛ́l / mɛ́ˀté	súˀ / sut	kwaal / kwaaˀ	niŋg / nin	maam / máámə̀t	teh / tɛt	règùm; rɛ̀ká	ríˀír / ríˀtɛ
Vere	Momi		nɔ̀r / nɔ̀ˀ	tɔ̀k / tɔ̀ˀˀ	mii / miin	nùùr / nùùˀ	meel / meeli	suu / suut	kpààl / kpaai	nènk / nèn	máàm / máŋ̀bət	tè / tèt	règùm; rɛ̀ká; rèèká	ríír / rííti
Vere	Vɔkba		nɔr / nɔˀti	tok / torum	nik (?)	núˀ	mɛ́l	súˀ	kòàl	néŋ / néŋti	mám	tɛˀ / tɛtə	regɨm	ríí
Vere	Wɔmmu		nɔ́r / núɔ́	tór / tóó (tʋ́r)	míí / mííne	nuurə̀/ núútə́	míɛ́le / mɛ́ɛ́té ~ míɛ́té	dóbʒɩ̀ / dówwi	kwaalə / kwaasə	nɛ́ŋkə / nɛ́nté	máám	tɛ́ɛ́ / tɛ́tə	rɛgum kwɔ́ú	níìr / nííté
Vere	Nissim		nɔ́ɔ́l / núɔ́	tóól / tɔ́ɔ́tə́	míí / mííne	núúlə / núúté	mɛɛ́lə / mɛɛ́té	dóbzə/ dóbpe	kpaalə / kpaate	neŋke / neŋte	máám, máám bonúm àm	tɛ́ɛ́ / tɛ́tə	lem kúɔ́; lekə	níllə / níttə́
Vere	Eilim		nɔ́l / nɔ́ɔ́	tól / tóó	míí / míímtə̀	núúl / núúté	mɛɛ́l / mɛɛ́té	dám / damderei	kpaal / kpaatə		mám̀	tɛ́ɛ̄	lem kúɔ́; lekə	líllə / níttə́
Vere	Kobom		nɔ́rì / nɔ́ɔ́	tókù / tóó	mí / míímītī	núúrì / nuute	mɛ́ɛ́ni / mɛ́té	dám / dámtíréí	mɛɛm	nɛ́ŋkù / nɛ́ŋté		tɛ́ / tɛ́ti	réí; rékɔ́	rííri / rííté
Vere	Vɔmnəm		nɔr / nɔɔ	tukò / tuŋbərəm	míì / míìm	nuurò / nuute	mɛɛlò / mɛɛte	súú / sútò	kwaalò / kwaasò	nɛ́ŋkò / nɛŋté	maàm	tɛɛ / tɛɛtə	rɛm; rɛkò	niirò / niite
Vere	Damtəm		nuɔ̀l / nuɔ̀rɛ	tɔ́l / tɔrɛ, tɔɔtɛ	míl / mííté	núl / núúte	mɛl / mɛɛte	dám / damtər	kpaal / kpaaʃe	lyɛngə̀ / lɛŋsyɛ		tii / tiitə̀		nʌ́l / nʌʌtə́
Vere	Gəunəm-Yar (Gə-Yarəm)		nual / nuare	cul / curie, tuure	míəl / mííré	núúl / núúré	míál / mɛ́re	dám / dámdə́	kpàal/ kpààsə̀də̀	nyáŋsə́l / nyáŋsé, nyáŋgə	mám	lau / lasə	lìní kúə́; lìə̀- kúə́	lə́l / lérə
Vere	Gə-Lim		nual / nuarie	túl / túríé	míil / mííré	nuul / nuurie	mɛ́rl / mɛ́ɛ́rɛ̄	dám / dámdə́	kpaal / kpaarie	nyángə́	mám	láú / lásə́	lìní; lìə̀- kúʌ́	lʌl / lʌʌrie
Gəmnəm	Beiya		nol / nootə	tol / tootə	mííl / míítə	núŋlə̄ / núŋ	mɛ́ɛ́l / mɛ́ɛ́tə	nok / noŋtə	meem / meemtə	néngə, nɛ́ngə / néŋzə, nɛ́ŋzə	má:m / máámtə̄	téé / teete	liiná; lìì kɔ́p	nííl / níítə
Gəmnəm	Gindoo		nɔl	tol	míl	nɨŋ́ lə	mɛ́l	nɔk	mem	nɨŋ́ ə / nɨŋ́ gə	mám	teˀ/ tetə		níl
Gəmnəm	Riitime		nɔ́lé / nɔ́ˀɔ́	tólé / tóˀó	mííle / mííˀe	lúŋle / lúŋe	méle / méˀē	nogúsa / nóŋté	mēēmē	léngo / léŋē	máámē / mámte	téˀé / tété	lii kóóp	lə́lē / lə́ˀə
Gəmme	Gəmme		nólé / nóˀɛ́	tólé / tóˀó	míhˀle / míhˀie	níŋlē / níŋē	méhˀle / méhyē	yòlé / yòé	míímé	níngē / níŋmē	memˀe	téˀé / teˀnē	lee lená	nímlē / nímē
Gəmme	Baanma		nɔla / nɔˀɔ	toga, toˀga / toˀma	míhla / míˀi	níŋla / níŋa	mɛ́hla / mɛˀɛ	yòla / yòˀo	miima / miimda	nɨŋ́ ga / nɨ́ŋma	mema / memda	teˀɛ/ teˀna	lee lená	nɨḿ la / nɨḿ a
Doyayo	Doyayo		lɔ¹lɛ¹ ~ yɔ̰¹lɛ¹	tɔ̰n¹ɛ¹	mḭḭl²; gɔ̰ɔ̰s²ɛ³	nuŋ⁴go²	mɛlɛ³²	ya̰a̰¹yɔ¹	ga̰a̰⁴mɛ²	lɛ̰ŋ³ko² ~ lɛ̰ŋ²ko³	mɛ¹mɛ³	tɛ̰ɛ̰¹yɔ¹	le², lek¹yɔ¹	nuŋ²
Fali	Proto-Fali		*nisu (pl.)	*tuuyV; *tuuCV	*unɨ		*rɛɛŋgu		*ndʒĩĩmV	*kopfti		*sɔɔ-	*rii-	*ĩn- (v.)
Mbum	Proto-Lakka		*nún	*sú-k	*cɔN-k	*sˣɛl/ŋ	*rím	*nɟá-k	*sˣɛ́-m	*hū-t/-k	*kpə̀(-k)	*mbì	*lʳak	*rìn
Kim	Goundo		ndʊɾʊ	huba	vw̃ãl	ɲu̯aɾ	ɗɛl	wʊ	tʃʊm	kal	mam	ura	dʒam	jɛmi
Kim	Besmé		ndua	hoɾo	vũãl	hĩjɪm	ɗelɛm	wu	tʃɔm	kaːl	mam	ura	dʒʊ̝m	dĩː
Kim	Kim	Kosop	ndʷaɾa	togor	vɔ̝̃r	kĩj̃ar	ɗɛl	wak ̚	sɔma	kal	mam	ʔwaɾa	za	dĩːl
Day	Day		nɔ́n	sɔ́g	mbúr	ngìì	lélì/lélè/lèè	nām	dém	bō̰	ʔém	mīɲ	-rì, lāà	jōō
Bua	Proto-Bua		*diil; *ʔiil	*to(l)(-)	*fo̰/ḛl/ɲ(-) ?	*nii(-); *ɲ- ?	*l₁el(-)	*mu/i	*s₂e/um(-) / *s₂ḛr-		*te/o(l/g-)	*l₂i/um(-); *me/on- ?	*l₁e; *tu(y)	*l₂iil
isolate	Laal		mɨla / mɨní	sɨ̀gál / sɨ̀gɨ́y	pən / -	yàmál / yèmí	mal / mə̀lí	yəwəl / -	suna / -	kòːg / kuagmi	miàdál / miàr ~ miariɲ	su / sùgá	kaw / kɨw; ɲag / ɲɨg; guru / guru; cíd / cíd	meːl / -

=== Numerals ===
Comparison of numerals in individual languages:

Classification	Language	1	2	3	4	5	6	7	8	9	10
Kam	Kam	bīmbīnī / bĩ̄	jīrāɡ	tʃàr	ǹdār	ŋ̀wūn	dʒùb (lit: six)	dʒùbjī̄rāɡ (lit: six-two)	sár	ɲǐzā	bò°
Kwa	Kwa (Baa) (1)	nùnkò	nɨ̀nk͡péː	nùmwāːn	nɨ̀nàːtˢ	nɨ̀núː	nɨ̀nwén nɨ̀nkũ̀ (5+1)	nɨ̀nwâːk͡péː (5+2)	nùnfwa᷆ːfwātˢ	nùnkwótˢ lá nùnkò (10-1)	nùnkwótˢ
Kwa	Kwa (Baa) (2)	nə́ nkú	nə́ ɡbéè	nə mwáàn	nə̀ nàt	nə núú	nə nwíya kũ̀, nə nwíyá nùkũ̀ (5+1)	nə nwíyá ɡbéè (5+ 2)	fɔ̀fɔ̀t	nukút lánùkù (10 - 1)	nukút
Waja-Jen, Longuda	Longuda (1)	laatwɛ̀	nààkwɛ̃́	nààtsə́r	nèénnyìr	nàànyɔ́	tsààtə̀n	ínéényìr inààtsə́r (4 + 3 ?)	nyíítìn	énàànyɔ́ ínéényìr (5 + 4 ?)	koo; kù (Zabe)
Waja-Jen, Longuda	Longuda (2)	naakhal	naaashir	naakwáí	naanyìr	nàànyó	nakhínàkwáí	nyinakwáí	nyíthìn	nyinannyó	nɔ̂m
Waja-Jen, Yungur, Libo	Kaan (Libo)	wunú	rɑ̀ɑ̀p	tɑɑrə́n	kuurún	wɔɔnɔ́n	woné wunu	woné rɑɑp	woné tɑɑrə́n	woné kuurún	kutún
Yungur	Dumne, Dirma, Waltahdi, Sukt`u (ẞénā )	Finni	F`itti	tahkin	kuurún	wɔɔnɔ́n	minn`dike	bu`uttu	kunk`urun	woné kuurún	buh
Waja-Jen, Jen	Burak	kwín	ráb	ɡ͡bunuŋ	net	nóob	naaʃín	nááre	nátát	ninit	ʃóób
Waja-Jen, Jen	Jenjo (Dza)	tsɨnɡ	bwənɡ / bwayunɡ	bwatə	bwanyə	bwahmə	hwĩtsɨnɡ (5+ 1)	hwĩyunɡ (5+ 2)	hwĩtə (5+ 3)	hwĩnyə (5+ 4)	bwahywə
Waja-Jen, Waja, Awak	Awak (1)	díːn	yɔ́rɔ́b	kunúŋ	náː	fwáːd	yidíkúún (kúún)	yidibírr (bírr)	naríb	tuːrkúb	kɔ́b
Waja-Jen, Waja, Awak	Awak (2)	díːn	yɔ́rɔ́b	kunúŋ	náː	fwáːd	kúún / yidíkúún	bírr / yidibírr	naríb	tuːrkúb	kɔ́b
Waja-Jen, Waja, Cham-Mona	Dijim-Bwilim	kwan	su̠	bwanbí	ɡwár	nu̠	nukún	nyibi	naru̠	wurwin	kwu̠
Waja-Jen, Waja, Dadiya	Dadiya	wiǹ	yo	tal	nal	nu	nukuǹ	ni̠bi̠l	nááli̠b	tí̠lku̠b	ku̠b
Waja-Jen, Waja, Tula	Bangunji (Bangwinji) (1)	wìn	yóp, yɔ́b	táát	náát	núŋ	núkùn	nibir, nibeet	naarùb	teet	kpóp, kwáb
Waja-Jen, Waja, Tula	Bangunji (Bangwinji) (2)	win	yob	taar	naar	nuŋ	nukɡun	niber	naarub	teer	kwab
Waja-Jen, Waja, Tula	Tula (Kɨtule)	wìːn	júrau	jítːà	jáːnà	júnù	júrùkùn	jídìbìn	nárɨ̀bú	túrkùbú	kúb
Waja-Jen, Waja, Tula	Waja (nyan wɩyáʋ̀)	ɡɛɛn	rɔɔp	kunoŋ	nɩɩ	nuwo	nokono	nibíyo	wunii	tɔɔrɔ	kwáp
Leko-Nimbari, Duru, Dii	Dii (Duru)	dáɡá	idú	tããnɔ́	ndaddʉ́ (2 x 2) ?	nɔ́nɔ́	ɡúú	ɡúndɛm ('ndɛm' means odd member)	kaʔandaddʉ́ (2 x 4)	kɛ́ɡdáɡá (' one finger is left ')	wãnɓóʔ
Leko-Nimbari, Duru, Dii	Dugun	dáɡá	irú	tããnó	ndaró (2 x 2) ?	sáá	ɡúú	ɡútamme	kaʔandadró (2 x 4)	kɛ́ɡdáɡá (' one finger is left ')	bōʔ
Leko-Nimbari, Duru, Dii	Duupa (Papé)	dáŋɡá	ittó	tããtó	nattó	sáá	ɡúú	ɡútambe	kaʔandaró (2 x 4) /naarúpa	kɛ́rdáŋɡá (' one finger is left ')	bòʔ
Leko-Nimbari, Duru, Voko-Dowayo, Kutin	Peere (Kutin)	də́ə	iro	tããro	naro	núuno	nóndə́ə	də́msàrà	dàaɡò (from Hausa ?)	ɡĩ̀ĩdə́ə (' one finger is left ' ?)	fób
Leko-Nimbari, Duru, Voko-Dowayo, Vere-Dowayo, Dowayo	Doyayo	ɡbúnú	éérɛ́	taarɛ	násɔ	noonɛ́	nɔ̀ɔnɡbúnú (5 + 1)	nɔ̀ɔnéérɛ́ (5 + 2)	nɔ̀ɔntaarɛ (5 + 3) / ɡẽẽse	nɔ̀ɔnnásɔ (5 + 4) / nàanzâ	kooblɛ
Leko-Nimbari, Duru, Voko-Dowayo, Vere-Dowayo, Vere-Gimme, Gimme	Gimme (Gəmme) (1)	wɔɔna	ítìɡè	taaɡè	náàɡè	nɔɔnɨ̀ɡe	nɔnɡe	nɔʔitiɡè	dàɡwà	nɨ́ŋsɨ́nè	kób
Leko-Nimbari, Duru, Voko-Dowayo, Vere-Dowayo, Vere-Gimme, Gimme	Gimme (Kampara) (2)	wɔɔna	idtiɡè	taaɡè	náàɡè	nɔɔnɨ̀ɡè	nɔnɡè	nɔʔidtiɡè	dāɡwà (probably from Hausa)	nɨ́ŋ̀sɨ́nè	kób
Leko-Nimbari, Duru, Voko-Dowayo, Vere-Dowayo, Vere-Gimme, Vere	Gə́mnə́m (1)	mani	tɛk	taarək	náárə́k	nɔɔnɔ̀k	nɔɔ waŋɡə	náárə́k àp tāārə̀k (4 + 3 ?)	náárə́k àp náárə́k (4 + 4 ?)	náárə́k àp nɔɔnɔ̀k (4 + 5 ?)	kóp
Leko-Nimbari, Duru, Voko-Dowayo, Vere-Dowayo, Vere-Gimme, Vere	Vɔmnəm (2)	màn	ètên	tāán	nānnò	ɡbà náárò	ɡbāāsə̀ mâl	ɡbāāsə̀ ètên	ɡbāāsə̀ táān	ɡbāāsə̀ nānnà	kòmnā
Leko-Nimbari, Duru, Voko-Dowayo, Vere-Dowayo, Vere-Gimme, Vere	Mom Jango	muzoz	ɪ̀ttə́z	tàáz	náz	ɡbanáá	bámbə́z	ɡbánsá	sàmsaara	píttámúzo (10 - 1 ?)	kòmna
Leko-Nimbari, Duru, Voko-Dowayo, Voko	Longto (Voko)	wə́ŋ̄ŋá	sittó	tããbó	nabbó	nɔ̃ɔ̃mó	sáámɛ	sã́rã́ŋŋá	nàànuśudɛ̂; nàándɛ	dɛ́ɛ́ɡínnaaɡɔ́	lɛǹnaaɡbɔ̀ŋ́; lɛnnaaḿ, lɛnaań
Leko-Nimbari, Leko	Kolbila (Zurá)	níiá	innú	toonú	nɛɛrəb	núnnub	núŋɡɔ́ɔs	núŋ innú (5 + 2)	núŋ toonú (5 + 3)	núŋ nɛɛrəb (5 + 4)	kôb
Leko-Nimbari, Leko	Samba Leko	nɨ́ŋa	iirà	toorà	naarà	núúnà	nɔ̂ŋɡɔ̂s	nɨ̂ŋsinà	dàɡwà	daanɨ̂ŋne (' one is left ')	kóp
Leko-Nimbari, Mumuye-Yandang, Mumuye	Mumuye	ɡbétè	ziti	taːti	dɛ̃̀ːtì	mǎːni	máŋɡbétè (5+ 1)	mánziti (5+ 2)	mántaːti (5+ 3)	mándɛ̃̀ːtì (5+ 4)	kopi
Leko-Nimbari, Mumuye-Yandang, Yandang	Bali (Maya)	ɓini	iye	taat	naat	nɔng	niɓini (5+ 1)	niaiye (5+ 2)	nitaat (5+ 3)	ninaat (5+ 4)	kop
Leko-Nimbari, Mumuye-Yandang, Yandang	Nyesam (Kpasham)	ɓíní	ʔíè	tátˢ	nātˢ	nɔ̃́ŋ	nāɓíní (5+ 1)	nāk͡píē (5+ 2)	nātáts (5+ 3)	nānāts (5+ 4)	kópʰ
Fali	South Fali	k͡pòlò	cúk /tʃʊ́k	tàːn	náːn / nʌ́ːn	kɛ̃rɛ̃w	yìɾá	ɟɔ̀ɾɔ́s	nàn nán	kʌ̀ntɛ́ŋ / ŋɡʌskum	ɾá
Mbum-Day, Bua	Niellim	ɓúdū	ndīdí	tērí	ɲɛ̄ní	lùní	táːr	lòŋɡɔ̄	twāːɲɛ̄ní	dòsó < Bagirmi	dokome
Mbum-Day, Bua	Tunya (Tunia)	sèlì	àrī	àtā	ànā	àlōnī	nānò	lúlú	kɔ̀ntā̰	àtī	kùtù
Mbum-Day, Bua	Zan Gula	sa:dʊŋ	ɾisːi	toːɾi	naːsɪ	tɛ	tɛ bɛ sa:dʊŋ (5 + 1)	tɛ bɛ ɾisːi (5 + 2)	tɛ bɛ toːɾi (5 + 3)	tɛ bɛ naːsɪ (5 + 4)	filoːle
Mbum-Day, Day	Day (Buna dialect)	nɡɔ̄ŋ́	dīí	tà	ndà	sɛ̄rì	sɛ̄rì mòn	bīyām tà (probably 'four three')	pārārā	bór sōŋ rə́ nɡɔ̄ŋ́ ('lacking one')	mò̰
Mbum-Day, Kim	Besme	mōndā / mbírāŋ	tʃírí	hā̰sī	ndày	ndìyārá	mānɡùl	ɗīyārā	ndāsì	nòmīnā	wàl
Mbum-Day, Kim	Kim	ɗú	zí	tā	ndà	nūwḛ̄y	mènènɡāl	ɓēálā / ɓēálār	tīmāl / wázìzí (10 - 2)	làmāɗō / wázìɗú (10 - 1)	wòl
Mbum-Day, Mbum, Southern	Mbum	mbìyə̀w	sérè	sāy	nìŋ	ndībī	zèy	zīndɔ́kɔ̀ sāy (10 - 3)	zīndɔ́kɔ̀ sérè (10 - 2)	zīndɔ́kɔ̀ mbìyə̀w (10 - 1)	bōó
Mbum-Day, Mbum, Northern, Tupuri-Mambai	Mambay	bóm	ɓàtì	bìsáʕ	bìnã̀ʕ	bìzépḛ́	bìɡírò	tàrnã́ɡà	fwàrnã́ɡà / wàr séʕnã́ fàɡ͡bàʕŋ ɓàtì	sêʕbóm / wàr séʕnã́ fàɡ͡bàʕŋ bóm	zóɗôm / séʕnã́ kíríb
Mbum-Day, Mbum, Northern, Tupuri-Mambai	Tupari	bɔ̈ɔ̄ŋ / böŋɛ̄ (full form)	ɓɔ̀ɡë	sùwàʔä	nàa	dūwēe	hïiráʔä	rënām	nènmàʔä	kàawàʔä	hùwàlë
Mbum-Day, Mbum, Eastern Mbum, Karang	Karang	mbéw	séɗè	sāy	nìŋ	ndīɓī	tɔ́tɔ́klɔ́	tòŋ ndɔ́k sāy [remains (in) hands 3]	tòŋ ndɔ́k séɗè [remains (in) hands 2]	tòŋ ndɔ́k mbéw[remains (in hands 1]	bǒh
Mbum-Day, Mbum, Eastern Mbum, Karang	Nzakambay	mbíew	sère	sày	nìŋ	ndiɓi	zèe	zì ndɔ́kɔ sày (10 - 3)	zì ndɔ́kɔ sère (10 - 2)	zì ndɔ́kɔ mbíew (10 - 1)	ɓoo
Mbum-Day, Mbum, Eastern Mbum, Koh	Koh (Kuo)	mbí̧à̧w / mbí̧ẁ	síɗè	sāy	nìŋ	ndēɓē	yíè /íyè	tò nɔ́ sāy (10 - 3)	tò nɔ́ síɗè (10 - 2)	tò nɔ́ mbí̧à̧w (10 - 1)	dùɔ

== See also ==
- Savannas languages
- Gur languages
