= Bikwin language =

Bikwin language may refer to:

- Leelau language, one of the languages of the Bikwin people
- Moo language, an Adamawa language of Nigeria
- Mak language (Adamawa), an Adamawa language of Nigeria
