= Savannas languages =

Language family

Savannas
- Gur–Adamawa
- Geographic distribution: West Africa, around Burkina Faso in the west to CAR in the east
- Linguistic classification: Niger–Congo?: Atlantic–Congo; Volta–Congo; Savannas
- Subdivisions: most ex-Gur, most ex-Adamawa, possibly Ubangian: (Central) Gur; Waja–Kam (close to Gur); Leko–Nimbari (close to Gur); Kulango; Bariba; Vyemo; Tiefo; Wara–Natyoro; Tusya (Win); Mbum–Day; Bambukic; Gbaya; ? Ubangian; ? Baa (Kwa); ? Oblo

Language codes
- Glottolog: nort3149

The Savannas languages, also known as Gur–Adamawa or Adamawa–Gur, is a branch of the Niger–Congo languages that includes Greenberg's Gur and Adamawa–Ubangui families.

== History of classification ==
The Gur–Adamawa link was demonstrated in Kleinewillinghöfer (1996) and has been accepted as established by later researchers, who have gone further in noting that the Adamawa and Gur languages themselves do not form coherent groups and are not necessarily more closely related internally than they are to each other.

Bennett (1983) had also mentioned a North Central Niger-Congo branch consisting of Gurunsi, "Ubangian", and Trans-Benue groups, with the Trans-Benue group consisting of the Burak-Jen (i.e., Bikwin–Jen), Yungur (i.e., Bena–Mboi), and Tula-Longuda subgroups.

There are several clusters of Adamawa languages; among the Gur languages, only the core of that proposal (Central Gur) has been retained, though it is possible that some of the 'peripheral' languages may turn out to be related to each other. Kleinewillinghöfer et al. (2012) note that a reconstruction of proto-Central Gur noun classes needs to include several Adamawa families.

Senufo (ex-Gur) and Fali (ex-Adamawa) are excluded from Savannas, as they appear to be some of the more divergent branches of Niger–Congo.

Dimmendaal (2008) excludes the Ubangian family from Niger–Congo altogether, stating that it "probably constitutes an independent language family that cannot or can no longer be shown to be related to Niger–Congo (or any other family)," though the Ubangian languages are themselves not a valid group, and the Gbaya branch may turn out to be related to Gur.

Apart from such exceptions, Dimmendaal notes that the Savanna languages "can be shown to be genetically related beyond any reasonable doubt. The evidence is not only lexical in nature, it is based primarily on a range of cognate grammatical morphemes."

Roger Blench (2012) considers Gur-Adamawa to be a language continuum (linkage) rather than an actual coherent branch.

Kleinewillinghöfer (2014) notes that many "Adamawa" languages in fact share more similarities with various (Central) Gur languages than with other Adamawa languages, and proposes that early Gur-Adamawa speakers had cultivated guinea corn and millet in a wooded savanna environment.

== Languages ==
The Savannas languages, with an agnostic approach to internal classification, are as follows:

- Savannas
  - (Central) Gur
  - Kulango (a.k.a. "Kulango–Lorhon": ex-Gur)
  - Bariba (a.k.a. "Baatonũ": ex-Gur)
  - Vyemo (ex-Gur)
  - Tiefo (ex-Gur)
  - Wara–Natyoro (ex-Gur)
  - Tusya (a.k.a. "Win": ex-Gur)
  - Chamba–Mumuye a.k.a. Leko–Nimbari (ex-Adamawa: G2, G4, G5, G12)
  - Mbum–Day (ex-Adamawa: G6, G13, G14, & Day)
  - Bambukic (ex-Adamawa: G7, G9, G10)
  - Waja–Kam (ex-Adamawa: G1, G8)
  - ? Baa (a.k.a. "Kwa")
  - Gbaya (ex-Ubangian)
  - ? Ubangian
  - ? Zande (ex-Ubangian)

The moribund Oblo language was left unclassified within Adamawa, and has not been addressed in Savannas.

Kleinewillinghöfer et al. (2012) note that the reconstruction of the noun-class system indicates that Waja ('Tula–Waja') and Leko–Nimbari ('Sama–Duru') (and possibly other Adamawa groups) belong with Central Gur, and that the noun-class system they reconstruct for these languages is akin to those of Bantu, Senufo, Tiefo, Vyemo, Tusya, and "Samu".

=== Güldemann (2018) ===
Güldemann (2018) recognises the following coherent "genealogical units" (8 Gur, 14 Adamawa, and 7 Ubangi) but is agnostic about their positions within Niger-Congo.

Gur area

1. (Central) Gur
2. Kulangoic
3. Miyobe
4. Tiefo
5. Viemo
6. Tusian
7. Samuic
8. Senufo

Adamawa area

1. Tula-Waja
2. Longuda
3. Bena-Mboi
4. Bikwin-Jen
5. Samba-Duru
6. Mumuyic
7. Maya (Yendangic)
8. Kebi-Benue (Mbumic)
9. Kimic
10. Buaic
11. Day
12. Baa = Kwa
13. Nyingwom = Kam
14. Fali

Ubangi area

1. Gbayaic
2. Zandic
3. Mbaic
4. Mundu-Baka
5. Ngbandic
6. Bandaic
7. Ndogoic

== Branches and locations (Nigeria) ==
Below is a list of major Savannas (Adamawa) branches and their primary locations (centres of diversity) within Nigeria based on Blench (2019).

Distributions of Adamawa branches in Nigeria
Branch	Primary locations
Duru (Vere)	Fufore LGA, Adamawa State
Leko	Adamawa and Taraba States; Cameroon
Mumuye	Taraba State
Yendang	Mayo Belwa and Numan LGAs, Adamawa State
Waja	Kaltungo and Balanga LGAs, Gombe State
Kam	Bali LGA, Taraba State
Baa	Numan LGA, Adamawa State
Laka	Karim Lamido LGA, Taraba State and Yola LGA, Adamawa State
Jen	Karim Lamido LGA, Taraba State
Bikwin	Karim Lamido LGA, Taraba State
Yungur	Song and Guyuk LGAs, Adamawa State
