= Day language =

Adamawa language spoken in southern Chad

Day
- Native to: southern Chad
- Native speakers: (50,000 cited 1993 census)
- Language family: Niger–Congo?: Atlantic–Congo; Volta-Congo; Savannas; Mbum–Day; Day

Language codes
- ISO 639-3: dai
- Glottolog: dayy1236

Day (also spelled Daye) is an Adamawa language of southern Chad, spoken by 50,000 or so people southeast of Sarh. Ethnologue reports that its dialects are mutually intelligible, but Blench (2004) lists Ndanga, Njira, Yani, Takawa, as apparently separate languages.

Pierre Nougayrol's publications and field notes of Day from the 1970s constitute almost all of the available materials on the Day language.

Güldemann (2018) notes that Day has few morphological and lexical features that are typical of Niger-Congo, and hence cannot be classified with certainty.

== Phonology ==
Consonants
	Labial	Alveolar	Palatal	Velar	Glottal
Plosive	p b	t d	ɟ	k g	ʔ
Implosive	ɓ	ɗ			
Prenasalized	ᵐb	ⁿd	ᶮɟ	ᵑg	
Fricative	v	s			h
Nasal	m	n	ɲ	ŋ	
Approximant	w	r l	j		

Vowels
	Front	Central	Back
High	i iː		u uː
Mid-high	e eː ẽ ẽː	ə̃ ə̃ː	o oː õ õː
Mid-low			ɔ ɔː
Low		a aː	

There are three tones: high, low, and mid.

== Lexicon ==
Some fish names in Day:

Day (Bouna)	Scientific name
gàgà	Chrysichthys auratus
jí yēē	Hepsetus odoe
gūrú	Heterobranchus bidorsalis
bɔ́gɔ̀	Heterotis niloticus
sɔ̄rɔ̄ŋ	Ophiocephalus obscurus
jīɲ	Protopterus annectens
kɔ̀tɔ̀kúnɔ̀	Tetraodon fahaka

Other animal names:

- kòŋní ʔólò (Pila wernei), a gastropod

Plant names in Day:

Day (Bouna)	Scientific name	Family
njīlī	Carissa edulis	Apocynaceae
vɔ̄r gɔ̀jɔ̀	Amaranthus viridis	Amaranthaceae
ndūgū re vōō	Ampelocissus africana / Ampelocissus multistriata	Ampelidaceae
rív	Annona senegalensis	Annonaceae
ndáávò	Hexalobus monopetalus	Annonaceae
hádìsó	Leptadenia hastata	Asclepiadaceae
mbɔ̄lɔ̄	Stereospermum kunthianum	Bignoniaceae
mbéèr	Burkea africana	Caesalpiniaceae
mōkílàŋ	Cassia sieberiana	Caesalpiniaceae
kèŋgèlibā	Cassia tora	Caesalpiniaceae
gív	Daniellia oliveri	Caesalpiniaceae
pōgō	Detarium microcarpum	Caesalpiniaceae
jōŋ, njílà	Piliostigma reticulatum / Bauhinia reticulata	Caesalpiniaceae
sùù	Tamarindus indica	Caesalpiniaceae
kʷéygírá	Gynandropsis gynandra	Capparidaceae
ɲíí dāŋ	Vernonia sp.	Asteraceae
gɔ̀ɔ̄ɲɔ̀	Cochlospermum tinctorium	Cochlospermaceae
ŋīmí yēē	Merremia sp.	Convolvulaceae
bón	Combretum glutinosum	Combretaceae
kíbāná, kɔ̄r dàr	Combretum sp.	Combretaceae
rɔ̀gɔ̀	Terminalia sp.	Combretaceae
pálpùū (ré) vōō	Commelina benghalensis	Commelinaceae
pálpùū (ré) táná	Commelina forskailii	Commelinaceae
ɗàlá	Citrullus vulgaris	Cucurbitaceae
jɔ̀gɔ́	Citrullus vulgaris / Colocynthis vulgaris	Cucurbitaceae
kùsú ŋín yēē	Cucumis melo var. agrestis	Cucurbitaceae
kùsú	Cucumis sativus	Cucurbitaceae
rùúŋ	Cucurbita pepo	Cucurbitaceae
ŋúù	Lagenaria siceraria / Lagenaria vulgaris	Cucurbitaceae
njòrò/gìndɔ́gɔ̀ (ɲíí ndògō)	Momordica charantia	Cucurbitaceae
bēɲ mbɔ̀rɔ́ŋ	Bulbostylis sp.	Cyperaceae
gāgrā	Hymenocardia acida	Euphorbiaceae
kùmɔ̄	Jatropha curcas	Euphorbiaceae
báná mbéèr	Burkea africana / Amblygonocarpus schweinfurthii	Euphorbiaceae
ŋòórkúmɔ̀	Combretum glutinosum	Euphorbiaceae
mbɔ̀r	Vitellaria paradoxa	tree
kɔ̀ndì	Hymenocardia acida	tree
sàkàrāàn	Cenchrus biflorus	Poaceae
gàlā táná	Cymbopogon giganteus	Poaceae
bànjá	Dactyloctenium aegyptiacum	Poaceae
mbáà	Eleusine coracana var. striata	Poaceae
tērīm/tērēm	Eragrostis cylindrica	Poaceae
kítíkáŋlá	Eragrostis tremula	Poaceae
tór	Imperata cylindrica	Poaceae
dōr	Pennisetum gibbosum	Poaceae
kàmsà, gɔ̀jɔ̀	Sorghum caudatum var. colorans	Poaceae
kōró mīɲ	Sorghum caudatum var. feterita	Poaceae
kōró dúŋ-nú	Sorghum elegans var. elegans	Poaceae
mbùl	Sorghum guineense var. involutum	Poaceae
ʔɔ́r (tōō-rɔ̄)	Sorghum guineense var. scintillons	Poaceae
sīɲ bìì	Sorghum mellitum var. mellitum	Poaceae
tíɲā	Sorghum membranaceum var. firmius	Poaceae
mbàtì kóò (var. indurata), mbàtì kóò mānjā	Zea mays	Poaceae
gēr tōō-rɔ̄	Andropogon sp.	Poaceae
ndàgə̰̀mɔ̀ tèmbè	Brachiaria sp.	Poaceae
bɔ̀gɔ́ gàà	Microprotus sp.	Poaceae
dàlà, sīɲ ndìlà	Sorghum sp.	Poaceae
kīnāvò, vòò	Ceiba pentandra	tree
sōn	Vitellaria paradoxa	tree
kò̰ kūū	Asparagus africanus	Liliaceae
hə̰̄	Dipcadi longifolium	Liliaceae
ŋìrà bò̰ dàná	Gloriosa simplex	Liliaceae
dúú	Hibiscus asper	Malvaceae
dúú dí njàgá	Urena lobata	Malvaceae
ɗènjī, ŋùúrkútū	Strychnos spinosa	Loganiaceae
kítíjàlà	Cissampelos mucronata	Menispermaceae
kò̰ tōō-rɔ̄	Acacia sieberiana	Mimosaceae
mbéèr	Amblygonocarpus schweinfurthii	Mimosaceae
lēl	Parkia biglobosa	Mimosaceae
sáàm	Prosopis africana	Mimosaceae
lòò kéré	Gisekia pharnaceoides	Molluginaceae
yāá yēē	Boerhavia repens	Nyctaginaceae
sìɲá	Ficus sp.	Moraceae
tírāáɲ	Afrormosia laxiflora	Papilionaceae
sōō dìm	Arachis hypogaea	Papilionaceae
mbámbàāl	Erythrina sigmoidea	Papilionaceae
gìndī gē	Rhynchosia minima	Papilionaceae
rēɲ ré táná	Tephrosia bracteolata	Papilionaceae
nɔ́n dɔ́gɔ̀	Tephrosia lupinifolia	Papilionaceae
sàà bíí, sàà bāná, sàà tōō-rɔ̄	Vigna catjang var. sinensis	Papilionaceae
sōō	Voandzeia subterranea	Papilionaceae
hòg mbúŋ	Ceratotheca sesamoides	Pedaliaceae
sɔ̀n tōō-rɔ̄	Sesamum indicum	Pedaliaceae
sɔ̀n pùū	Sesamum radiatum	Pedaliaceae
tàv	Securidaca longipedunculata	Polygalaceae
bònò	Polypterus bichir	Polygalaceae
kírùgjú	Portulaca oleracea	Portulacaceae
ŋūtā	Sarcocephalus esculentus	Rubiaceae
hòg nām vàrā	Solanum sp.	Solanaceae
gìmī ré táná	Melochia corchorifolia	Sterculiaceae
sōn	Vitellaria paradoxa / Butyrospermum parkii	Sapotaceae
hòg gìtì kàrā	Corchorus tridens	Tiliaceae
bɔ̄r	Grewia mollis	Tiliaceae
gìmī ré vōō	Triumfetta pentandra	Tiliaceae
kóg/kóò kɔ̀ɔ̄l	Triumfetta sp.	Tiliaceae
laɲ yāā bārá	Tribulus terrestris	Zygophyllaceae
