= Loron =

Loron may refer to:

- Tenbo/Loron people
- Clodronic acid, as per trade name
