= OBL =

OBL or ÖBL may refer to:

== Basketball ==
- Obol Basketball League, former name for the Swedish Basketball League
- Orlen Basket Liga, the Polish Basketball League name from 2023
- Österreichische Basketball Bundesliga, the top basketball league in Austria

== Other ==
- Osama bin Laden (1957–2011), founder of the al-Qaeda militant organization
- Zoersel-Oostmalle Airfield, Belgium (IATA code)
- Oblique case, a grammatical case
- Obligate wetland plant, a wetland indicator status
- Österreichisches Biographisches Lexikon 1815–1950, a biographical dictionary of individuals who've contributed to the history of Austria
- One Bank Limited, a Bangladeshi bank
- Oblo language of northern Cameroon (ISO 639-3 code: obl)
