= Tuni language =

The Tuni language may refer to:

- Tunni language, an Afro-Asiatic language spoken in Somalia
- Lorhon language, a Niger-Congo language spoken in the Ivory Coast
