= Tha language =

Adamawa language of Nigeria

Tha
- θá
- Native to: Nigeria
- Region: Taraba State
- Native speakers: (1,000 cited 1998)
- Language family: Niger–Congo?: Atlantic–Congo; Bambukic; Bikwin–Jen; Jen; Tha

Language codes
- ISO 639-3: thy
- Glottolog: thaa1239
- ELP: Tha

Tha (θá) is an Adamawa language of Nigeria.
