= Besme language =

Adamawa language spoken in Chad

Besme
- Native to: Chad
- Native speakers: (1,200 cited 1993 census)
- Language family: Niger–Congo?: Atlantic–Congo; Mbum–Day; Kim languages; Besme

Language codes
- ISO 639-3: bes
- Glottolog: besm1235
- ELP: Besme

Besme is an Adamawa language of Chad. It is one of the three members of the Kim languages group, together with Kim and Goundo.
