= Goundo language =

Language

Goundo
- Native to: Chad
- Native speakers: (30 cited 1998)
- Language family: Niger–Congo?: Atlantic–Congo; Mbum–Day; Kim languages; Goundo

Language codes
- ISO 639-3: goy
- Glottolog: goun1238
- ELP: Goundo

Goundo is a nearly extinct Adamawa language of Chad. It is one of the three members of the Kim languages group, together with Kim and Besme.

Today, only older adults speak the language, as many young people shifted to Kabalai and Nancere.

Ethnologue lists Goundo villages as Goundo-Bengli, Goundo-Nangom, and Goundo-Yila in Kélo and Lai subprefectures, Tandjilé Region.
