= Kim languages =

Group of languages spoken in southern Chad

Kim
- Geographic distribution: southern Chad
- Linguistic classification: Niger–Congo?: Atlantic–Congo; Volta-Congo; Savannas; Mbum–Day; Kim

Language codes
- Glottolog: kimb1240

The Kim languages are a small group of the Mbum–Day languages of the provisional Savanna family, spoken in southern Chad.

There are three languages:

Kim (Garap, Gerep, Kolop, Kosop), Besme, Goundo.

Goundo is nearly extinct, and Besme has only a thousand or so speakers.

The Kim languages were labeled "G14" in Joseph Greenberg's Adamawa language-family proposal.

== See also ==
- Kim word lists (Wiktionary)
