= Lo language =

Lo language may refer to:

- Lo-Toga language, an Oceanic language of Vanuatu
- Guro language, a Mande language of Ivory Coast
- Loo language, an Adamawa language of Nigeria

== See also ==
- Lao language, ISO 639-1 code: lo
