= Kwah language =

Niger–Congo language spoke in Nigeria

Kwah
- Baa
- nyaa Báà
- Native to: Nigeria
- Region: Numan LGA, Adamawa State
- Native speakers: (7,000 cited 1992)
- Language family: Niger–Congo?: Atlantic–Congo; Savannas; (unclassified); Kwah
- Dialects: Gyakan; Kwa

Language codes
- ISO 639-3: kwb
- Glottolog: kwaa1262

Báà
- Person: raBáà
- People: Báà
- Language: nyaa Báà

Kwah (Kwa), also known as Baa (Bàː), is a Niger–Congo language of uncertain affiliation; the more it has been studied, the more divergent it appears. Joseph Greenberg counted it as one of the Bambukic languages of the Adamawa family. Boyd (1989) assigned it its own branch within Waja–Jen. Kleinewillinghöfer (1996) removed it from Waja–Jen as an independent branch of Adamawa. When Blench (2008) broke up Adamawa, Kwah became a provisional independent branch of his larger Savannas family.

Blench (2019) lists the locations of Baa as Gyakan and Kwa towns (located near Munga) in Numan LGA, Adamawa State, Nigeria. One Baa-speaking person (singular) is raBáà (sg.), and more than one would be Báà (pl.); the language is referred to by speakers as nyaa Báà. The Baa varieties in each of the two towns differ primarily in phonology.

Baa traditional religion has two main deities, Gbandima and Kassimin.
