= Lala-Roba language =

Adamawa language spoken in Nigeria

Lala
- Ɓəna
- Native to: Nigeria
- Region: Adamawa State
- Native speakers: 232,987 (2010)
- Language family: Niger–Congo?: Atlantic–Congo; Bambukic; Yungur; Yungur–Roba; Lala

Language codes
- ISO 639-3: lla
- Glottolog: lala1261

Lala (a.k.a. Ɓəna) is an Adamawa language of Nigeria. It is also known as Ebode, Gworam, Lala, or Roba.
