= Bena language (Adamawa) =

Adamawa language of Nigeria

Bena
- Yungur
- Ebəna
- Native to: Nigeria
- Region: Adamawa State
- Native speakers: (95,000 cited 1992)
- Language family: Niger–Congo?: Atlantic–Congo; Bambukic; Yungur; Yungur–Roba; Bena

Language codes
- ISO 639-3: yun
- Glottolog: bena1260

Bəna
- People: Bəna
- Language: Ebəna

Bena (Bəna, a.k.a. Binna, Buna, Ebina, Ebuna, Gbinna, "Lala", Purra, Yangeru, Yongor, Yungur) is an Adamawa language of Nigeria.

Bena-Yungur has a 3-tone system. The Yungur people are majorly located in Song, local government of Adamawa state, constituting 75% of the total population of the Local area.
