= Jen language =

Adamawa language of Nigeria

Dza
- Jen
- idzə
- Pronunciation: [ídzə̀]
- Native to: Nigeria
- Region: Gombe State, Taraba State, Adamawa State
- Native speakers: 100,000 (2014)
- Language family: Niger–Congo?: Atlantic–Congo; Bambukic; Bikwin–Jen; Jen languages; Dza

Language codes
- ISO 639-3: jen
- Glottolog: dzaa1238

Dza, also called Jen, is an Adamawa language of Nigeria spoken in the border regions of Gombe, Adamawa, and Taraba states along the northern bank of the Benue River.

== Phonology ==
The following is the phonology of Dza:

=== Vowels ===
Oral vowels
	Front	Central	Back
Close	i	ɨ	u
Close-mid	e	ə	o
Open-mid	ɛ	ə	ɔ
Open		a	

Nasal vowels
	Front	Central	Back
Close	ĩ	ɨ̃	ũ
Close-mid		ə̃	
Open-mid	ɛ̃	ə̃	ɔ̃
Open		ã	

Breathy vowels
	Front	Central	Back
Close	i̤		ṳ
Close-mid	e̤	ə̤	o̤
Open-mid		ə̤	
Open		a̤	

=== Consonants ===
		Labial	Alveolar	Palatal	Velar	Labio-velar	Glottal
Plosive	plain	p b	t d	(c) (ɟ)	k ɡ	k͡p ɡ͡b	
Plosive	lab.	pʷ bʷ	tʷ		kʷ gʷ		
Plosive	palat.	pʲ bʲ			(kʲ) (gʲ)		
Plosive	implosive	(ɓ)	(ɗ)				
Affricate	plain		t͡s d͡z	t͡ʃ d͡ʒ			
Affricate	lab.		t͡sʷ d͡zʷ	t͡ʃʷ d͡ʒʷ			
Fricative	plain	f v	s z	ʃ ʒ			h
Fricative	lab.		sʷ zʷ				
Fricative	palat.	fʲ		ʃʲ			
Nasal	plain	(m̥) m	n	ɲ	ŋ		
Nasal	lab.	mʷ	nʷ	ɲʷ	ŋʷ		
Nasal	palat.	mʲ					
Rhotic			r				
Approximant	lateral		l				
Approximant	lat. lab.		lʷ				
Approximant	plain			(j̥) j			
Approximant	lab.			ɥ̥ ɥ	ʍ w		

1. The implosives are weak in Dza, [b] and [d] can take the place of their implosive counterparts but the implosive sounds cannot be substituted in place of [b] or [d].
2. The palatal stops /c/ and /ɟ/ seem to be dialectal, either presenting as [c] and [ɟ] or as palatalized velar stops [kʲ] and [gʲ].
3. The /m̥/ phoneme is rare, only occurring in m̥ɨ́ 'five' and other related words, but its usage is very frequent.
4. /r/ only occurs in loanwords but is frequent in use.
5. All approximant phonemes become voiceless before nasal vowels, allowing for an allophonic [j̥] while the other voiceless approximants /ʍ/ and /ɥ̥/ are true phonemes.

=== Tone ===
Like most West African languages, Dza is a tonal language. There are five main tonemes: three level tones (high, mid, and low) and two contour tones (rising and falling). Tone is not orthographically marked.

=== Orthography ===
Dza uses an alphabet of 50 letters based on the Latin alphabet. Proposed in 2008, the orthography uses a combination of multigraphs and diacritics to correspond to the phonemes of Dza, using the letters <w> and <y> to represent labialization and palatalization, respectively. While [j̥] is an allophone of /j/ in Dza only occurring before nasal vowels, it has its own grapheme <hy>. When /ŋ/ is word-initial and labialized, it is represented as <n>; otherwise, it is written as <ng>.

Letter(s)	Phoneme(s)	Example
a	/a/	ba /bá/ "goat"
a	/a̤/	hywa /ɥ̥à̤/ "knife"
ã	/ã/	kã /kã̄/ "big"
b	/b/	be /bē/ "rope"
b	/ɓ/	buchi /ɓút͡ʃì/ "arrow"
ch	/t͡ʃ/	chi /t͡ʃì/ "cloud"
ɔ	/ɔ/	yɔ /jɔ̄/ "pig"
ɔ̃	/ɔ̃/	sɔ̃sɔ̃ /sɔ̃́sɔ̃̀/ "egret"
d	/d/	dəng /də̀ŋ/ "music"
d	/ɗ/	dɨ /ɗɨ̀/ "to take"
dz	/d͡z/	idzə /ídzə̀/ "Dza language"
e	/e/	he /hē/ "wife"
e	/e̤/	hehe /hē̤hē̤/ "tribute"
ɛ	/ɛ/	wɛ /wɛ́/ "yam"
ɛ̃	/ɛ̃/	hɛ̃ /hɛ̃́/ "all"
ə	/ə/	pə /pə̀/ "to pierce, stab"
ə	/ə̤/	hywə /ɥ̥ə̤̄/ "tiger"
ə̃	/ə̃/	kə̃ /kə̃́/ "to squeeze"
f	/f/	fi /fǐ/ "sun, daylight"
g	/ɡ/	ga /gà/ "mane"
gb	/g͡b/	gbə /g͡bə́/ "to break"
gy	/ɟ/	gyɛ /ɟɛ̀/ "beside, near"
h	/h/	ho /hò/ "bag"
hm	/m̥/	bwahmɨ /bʷàm̥ɨ́/ "five"
hw	/ʍ/	hwə /ʍə̀/ "clay"
hy	[j̥]	hyə̃ /j̥ə̃́/ "animal, meat"
hyw	/ɥ̥/	hywi /ɥ̥ī/ "smoke"
i	/i/	ki /kí/ "stalk"
i	/i̤/	ki /kī̤/ "mat"
ĩ	/ĩ/	kĩ /kĩ́/ "to clean"
ɨ	/ɨ/	pɨ /pɨ̄/ "space"
ɨ̃	/ɨ̃/	pɨ̃ /pɨ̃̄/ "hoe"
j	/d͡ʒ/	ji /d͡ʒí/ "horn"
k	/k/	ku /kú/ "head"
kp	/k͡p/	kpɛ /k͡pɛ̌/ "eagle"
ky	/c/	bəmpɨkyĩ /bə̀mpɨ̀cĩ́/ "tomorrow"
l	/l/	lə /lə́/ "tongue"
m	/m/	mi /mí/ "beer"
n	/n/	na /nǎ/ "mother"
n	/ŋ/	nwa /ŋwá/ "mouth"
ng	/ŋ/	ngə /ŋə́/ "to drive"
ny	/ɲ/	nyi /ɲí/ "heart"
o	/o/	so /sò/ "mouth cavity"
o	/o̤/	so /sò̤/ "elephant"
p	/p/	pa /pā/ "barn"
r	/r/	dəro /də̀rò/ "book"
s	/s/	sa /sà/ "island"
sh	/ʃ/	shə /ʃə̀/ "rat"
t	/t/	ta /tǎ/ "father"
ts	/t͡s/	tsɛ /t͡sɛ̄/ "peanut"
u	/u/	hu /hú/ "new"
u	/ṳ/	hu /hṳ̀/ "grass"
ũ	/ũ/	hũ /hṹ/ "shoe"
v	/v/	vĩ /vĩ̄/ "to write"
w	/w/	wu /wú/ "to come"
y	/j/	yi /jǐ/ "to swim
yw	/ɥ/	ywa /ɥá/ "wind"
z	/z/	za /zà/ "vulture"
zh	/ʒ/	zhĩzhĩ /ʒĩ̀ʒĩ̀/ "falcon"
