= Nimbari language =

Extinct Leko–Nimbari language of Cameroon

Nimbari
- Niam-Niam
- Native to: northern Cameroon
- Region: Bénoué, Mayo-Louti
- Ethnicity: 130 (2002)
- Extinct: 1930s
- Language family: Niger–Congo?: Atlantic–Congo; Leko–Nimbari; Nimbari

Language codes
- ISO 639-3: nmr
- Glottolog: nimb1256
- ELP: Nimbari

The Nimbari language (also Niam-Niam), is an extinct Leko–Nimbari group of Savanna languages. It was spoken in northern Cameroon. Ethnologue (22nd ed.) lists Badjire, Gorimbari, and Padjara-Djabi villages as Nimbari locations in Bénoué and Mayo-Louti divisions.

Nimbari was labeled "G12" in Joseph Greenberg's Adamawa language-family proposal.

== Distribution ==
Nimbari is located near Pitoa (Pitoa commune, Bénoué department) and Mayo-Louti (Figuil commune), Northern Region. The so-called Nyam-Nyam of Mayo-Kébi should not be confused with the so-called Nyam-Nyam of Galim and Tignère, whose real name is Nizaa (or Suga), of Mambiloid affiliation.

== History and classification ==
Kastenholz and Kleinewillinghöfer (2012) note that Nimbari cannot be classified with certainty due to limited data. It is a Fali name meaning 'people of Mbari'. People who identify as Nimbari currently speak Kangou (or Kaangu, Kaang), a variety of Southern Fali, and identify the ethnic name Nimbari with their village, Gorimbari. Kastenholz and Kleinewillinghöfer (2012) report from a 2008 field trip that the name Mbaari refers to an inselberg (Fali language: ɡɔ́rì) central to the village of Gorimbari (Gorimbaara [ɡóːrímbáːrà]). Nimbari is derived from the Fali term níí mbáárì 'people/person (niru) of Mbaari'.

Strümpell (1922/23) reported Nimbari to be the autonym of Niam-Niam language speakers. Originally, Strümpell (1910) called the language Niam-Niam, and had documented some limited data of questionable quality from elderly rememberers; the language was already no longer in everyday use at the time of data collection. Kastenholz and Kleinewillinghöfer (2012) note that some items in Strümpell's word list share similarities with Duru languages (Dii, Duupa, Dugun), and also with Samba Leko and Kolbila to a lesser extent. However, many words have no clear parallels with other Adamawa languages.

== Vocabulary ==
Nimbari vocabulary
gloss	Nimbari
rain, water	beːm
egg	bḛlḛ
moon	fwo
