= Bambukic languages =

Bambukic
- Yungur–Jen, Trans-Benue
- Geographic distribution: eastern Nigeria
- Linguistic classification: Niger–Congo?: Atlantic–Congo; Savannas; Bambukic
- Subdivisions: Bikwin–Jen; Bena–Mboi (Yungur); Longuda

Language codes
- Glottolog: None waja1258 (Waja–Jen)

The Bambukic a.k.a. Trans-Benue or Yungur–Jen languages form a proposed branch of the provisional Savanna languages, a reduced form of the Waja–Jen branch of the old Adamawa languages family (G7, G9, G10). They are spoken in north eastern Nigeria. Their unity is not accepted by Güldemann (2018).

Bennett (1983) had also proposed a Trans-Benue group consisting of the Burak-Jen (i.e., Bikwin-Jen), Yungur (i.e., Bena-Mboi), and Tula-Longuda subgroups.

== Languages ==
Blench (2006) groups the Yungur (G7), Bikwin–Jen (G9), and Longuda (G10) languages together within part of a larger Gur–Adamawa language continuum.

- Bikwin–Jen
  - Jen: Dza (Jen), Mingang Doso, Tha, Joole
  - Bikwin: Burak–Loo, Mághdì, Mak, Moo (Gomu) – Leelau (Bikwin) – Kyak (Bambuka)
- Longuda
- Yungur (Bəna–Mboi)
  - Kaan (Libo)
  - Mboi (Gəna, Banga, Handa)
  - Yungur–Roba: Lala-Roba, Voro, Bəna

Kleinewillinghöfer (1996) notes the affinities of the Bikwin languages, which were unknown to Greenberg, with the Jen languages. Subclassification follows Blench (2004).

The Waja languages were once thought to belong to this group, but are now placed with the Kam language. (See Adamawa languages.)
