= Kulango languages =

Atlantic-Congo languages

Kulango
- Kulango–Lorhon
- Geographic distribution: Ivory Coast, Ghana, Burkina Faso
- Linguistic classification: Niger–Congo?: Atlantic–Congo; Savannas; Kulango

Language codes
- Glottolog: kula1283

The Kulango or Kulango–Lorhon languages are spoken principally in Ivory Coast. They were once classified as part of an expanded Gur (Voltaic) family and are now part of the Savannas proposal.

The languages distinguished by Ethnologue are:

- Bondoukou Kulango (100,000 speakers in Ivory Coast and Ghana),
- Bouna Kulango (160,000 speakers in Ivory Coast and Ghana),
- Lomakka (a.k.a. Loma; 8,000 speakers),
- Téén (a.k.a. Lorhon, Loghon; 8,000 speakers in Ivory Coast and Burkina Faso,

which are not mutually intelligible. According to Ethnologue, Lomakka is closer to Bondoukou Kulango than Téén is, and Téén is closer to Lomakka and Bouna Kulango than it is to Bondoukou Kulango.
