= Mingang Doso language =

Adamawa language of Nigeria

Mingang Doso
- Məŋgáŋ Dosó
- Native to: Nigeria
- Region: Taraba State, Adamawa State
- Native speakers: (3,000 cited 1995)
- Language family: Niger–Congo?: Atlantic–Congo; Bambukic; Bikwin–Jen; Jen; Mingang Doso

Language codes
- ISO 639-3: mko
- Glottolog: ming1254
- ELP: Mingang Doso

Munga Doso (Məŋgáŋ Dosó) is an Adamawa language of Nigeria. It is one of over 500 indigenous languages of that country. As of 1992, the approximate number of Munga Doso speakers was 7,500 (this should not be taken as the current population of Munga Doso). The residents of those speakers are found in Taraba State along the environs of Karim-Lamido LGA Headquarters of Taraba State, before Jen on the eastern side close to the Benue River. The Munga doso settlement is located at approximately 9°19′N and 11°20′E between Karim Lamido town and Jen.
