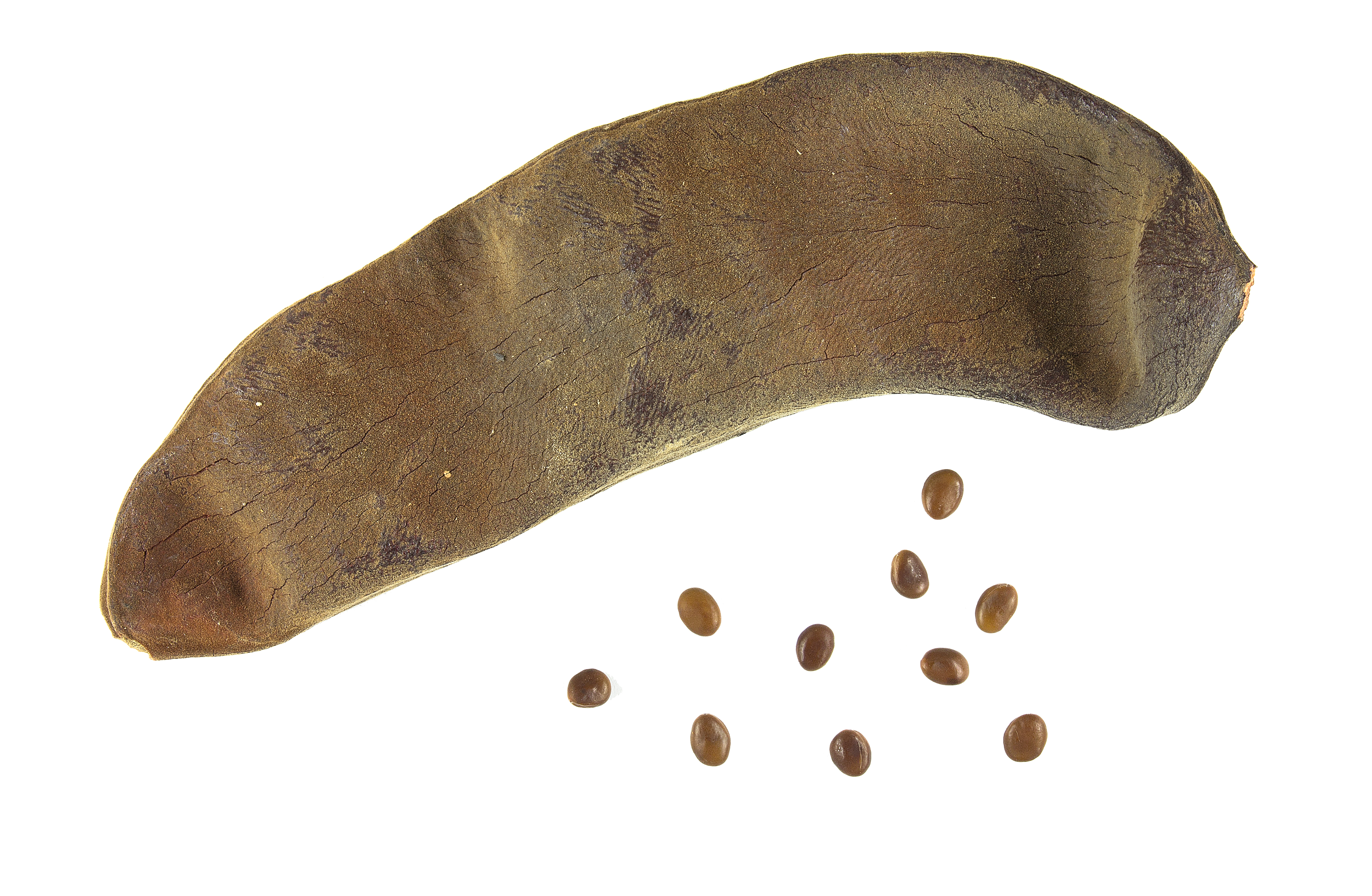
- P. thonningii pod and seeds - MHNT

Scientific classification
- Kingdom: Plantae
- Clade: Tracheophytes
- Clade: Angiosperms
- Clade: Eudicots
- Clade: Rosids
- Order: Fabales
- Family: Fabaceae
- Genus: Piliostigma
- Species: P. thonningii

Binomial name
- Piliostigma thonningii (Schum.) Milne-Redh.

Synonyms
- Homotypic: Bauhinia thonningii Schumach.; Heterotypic: Bauhinia abyssinica A.Rich.; Bauhinia articulata Oliv.; Bauhinia pyrrhocarpa Hochst.; Bauhinia reticulata var. rubiginosa A.Chev.; Bauhinia tamarindacea Delile; Piliostigma pyrrhocarpum (Hochst.) Hochst.

= Piliostigma thonningii =

Species of legume

Piliostigma thonningii is a species of flowering plants in the legume family, Fabaceae. It belongs to the subfamily Cercidoideae. Common names of this tree include camel's foot tree, monkey bread, monkey biscuit tree, "Rhodesian Bauhinia" or "wild bauhinia" (previously placed in that genus).

== Description ==
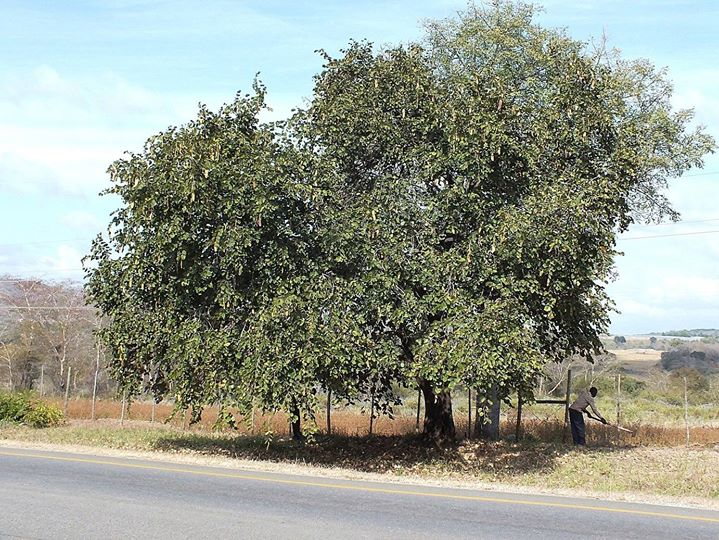
P. thonningii tree in South Africa

Piliostigma thonningii grows quickly relative to some other tree species it competes with, and relies on rapid re-growth to survive bush fires. It grows in African wooded grassland or woodland.

It grows up to 5–10 m (16–33 ft) tall, with leaves that are similar to a bauhinia, but it differs from bauhinia by having separate male and female flowers on separate trees. The flower petals are white and the thick, calyces (or seed pods) are covered in rust coloured hairs. The pods do not spilt (like other tree pods) but fall from the branches, then rot whilst on the ground, releasing the seeds.

The inner bark of the tree has been used to make rope.

== Other sources ==
- Gignoux, Jacques; Clobert, Jean; Menaut, Jean-Claude (1997-01-01). "Alternative Fire Resistance Strategies in Savanna Trees". Oecologia. 110 (4): 576–583. Bibcode:1997Oecol.110..576G. doi:10.1007/s004420050198. ISSN 0029-8549. JSTOR 4221648. PMID 28307253.
