= Longuda language =

Niger–Congo language of Nigeria

Lunguda
- Nyà Núngúrá
- Native to: Nigeria
- Region: Adamawa State, Gombe State
- Ethnicity: Lunguda people
- Native speakers: (40,000 cited 1973)
- Language family: Niger–Congo?: Atlantic–Congo; ? Bambukic; Lunguda

Language codes
- ISO 639-3: lnu
- Glottolog: long1389

Nungura
- People: Nùngùrábà
- Language: Nyà Núngúrá

Lunguda (Nʋngʋra) is a Niger–Congo language spoken in Nigeria. They settle in the western part of Gongola mainly in and around the hills of the volcanic Lunguda Plateau, Adamawa state. Joseph Greenberg counted it as a distinct branch, G10, within the Adamawa family. When Blench (2008) broke up Adamawa, Lunguda was made a branch of the Bambukic languages.

According to the Ethnologue, the current number of speakers is based on an SIL figure of 45,000 from 1973. But recent studies has shown 50,000 in the 2006 census.

Variants of the name Longuda include Languda, Longura, Nunguda, Nungura, Nunguraba.

== Dialects ==
In the Adamawa Languages Project website, Kleinewillinghöfer (2014) lists five dialects in the Longuda dialect cluster.

- Longuda/Lunguda of Guyuk and Wala Lunguda (Though one is in Adamawa and the other Gombe, they share the same dialect and it is believed that the ancestral home of the Lungudas was Wala Lunguda in Gombe State.)
- Nʋngʋra(ma) of Cerii, Banjiram
- Longura(ma) of Thaarʋ (Koola)
- Nʋngʋra(ma) of Gwaanda (Nyuwar)
- Nʋngʋra(ma) of Deele (Jessu)

Partly due to word taboo customs, there is considerable lexical diversity among Longuda dialects.

== Geography ==
The Lunguda settle in the northeastern part of Nigeria, mostly in Guyuk, Adamawa state in Guyuk LGA, Balanga LGA of Gombe state and some parts of Borno. They have approximately 504,000 according to 2006 population census.

== Names and locations ==
Below is a list of language names, populations, and locations from Blench (2019).

Language	Branch	Dialects	Alternate spellings	Own name for language	Endonym(s)	Speakers	Location(s)
Longuda	Longuda	Nya Guyuwa (Guyuk plains), Nya Ceriya (Banjiram=Cirimba/Chikila Cerembe 'rookie place'), Nya Tariya (Kola=Taraba), Nya Dele (Jessu=Delebe), Nya Gwanda (Nyuar=Gwandaba)	Lunguda, Nunguda, Nungura, Nunguraba	nyà núngúrá Guyuk, Nungurama Nyuar	Núngúráyábá Guyuk, Nùngùrábà Jessu, Lungúrábá Kola	13,700 (1952: Numan Division); 32,000 (1973 SIL)	Adamawa State, Guyuk LGA; Gombe State, Balanga LGA

The largest ward is Chikila ward.
