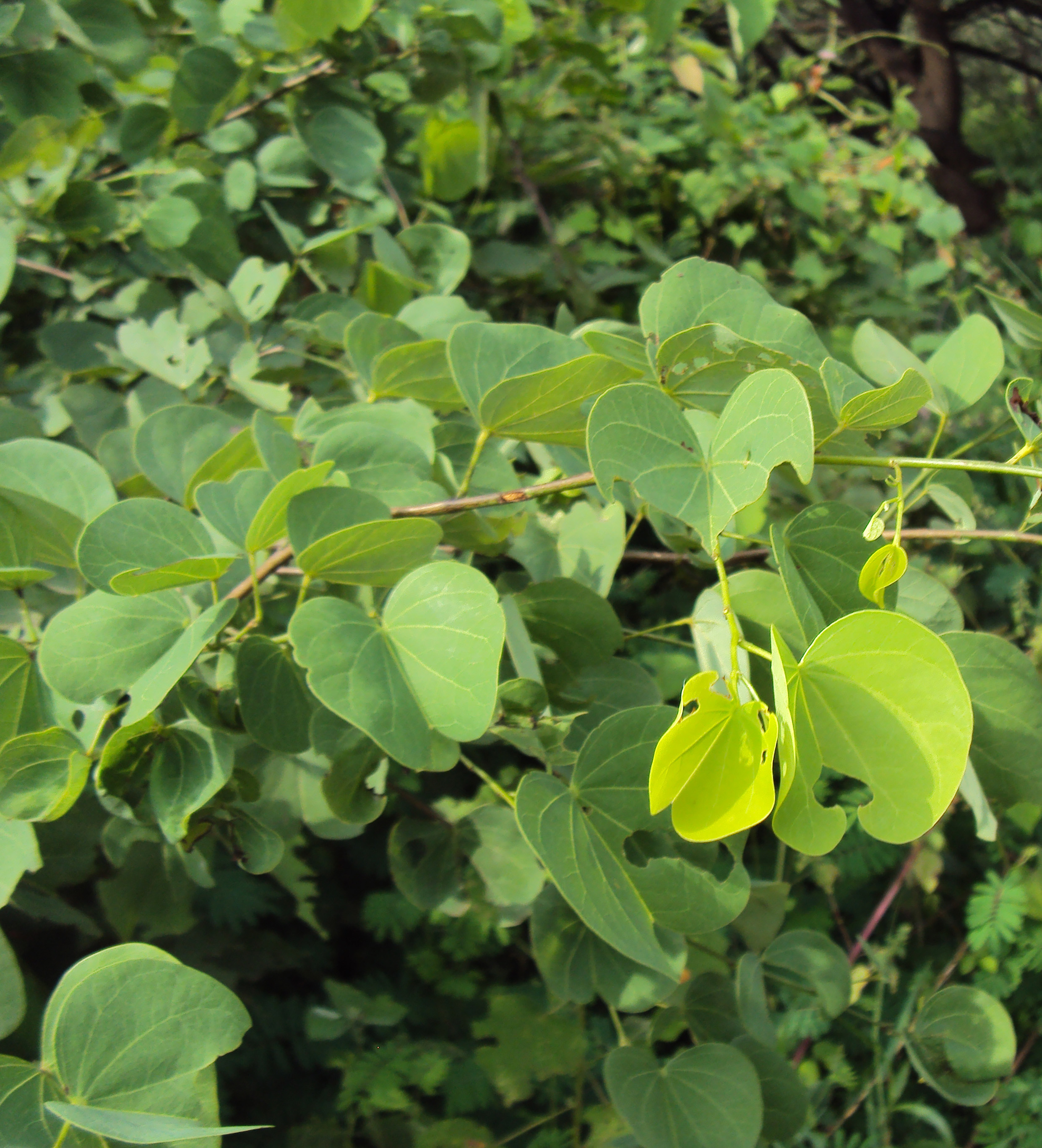
- Piliostigma malabaricum

Scientific classification
- Kingdom: Plantae
- Clade: Tracheophytes
- Clade: Angiosperms
- Clade: Eudicots
- Clade: Rosids
- Order: Fabales
- Family: Fabaceae
- Subfamily: Cercidoideae
- Tribe: Bauhinieae
- Genus: Piliostigma; Hochst. (1846), nom. cons.

Type species
- Piliostigma reticulatum (DC.) Hochst.

Species
- 5; see text

Synonyms
- Elayuna Raf. (1838); Locellaria Welw. (1859); Pileostigma Hochst. (1846), orth. var.

= Piliostigma =

Genus of legumes

Piliostigma is a genus of flowering plants in the legume family, Fabaceae. It includes five species of small deciduous trees native to sub-Saharan Africa, the Indian subcontinent, Indochina, Java, the Philippines, and northern Australia. It belongs to the subfamily Cercidoideae and the tribe Bauhinieae. It is dioecious, with male and female flowers on separate plants.

== Species ==
Piliostigma comprises the following species:

- Piliostigma foveolatum (Dalzell) Thoth.
- Piliostigma malabaricum (Roxb.) Benth.—purple orchid tree
- Piliostigma reticulatum (DC.) Hochst.
- Piliostigma thonningii (Schum.) Milne-Redh.
- Piliostigma tortuosum (Collett & Hemsl.) Thoth.

Some other species often placed here are nowadays usually assigned their traditional genus Bauhinia again.
