= Burak language =

Adamawa language of Nigeria

Burak
- Ɓúúrák
- Native to: Nigeria
- Region: Gombe State
- Native speakers: (4,000 cited 1992)
- Language family: Niger–Congo?: Atlantic–Congo; Bambukic; Bikwin–Jen; Bikwin; Burak–Loo; Burak

Language codes
- ISO 639-3: bys
- Glottolog: bura1271

Ɓúúrák
- Person: yu Ɓuurak
- People: yele Ɓuurak
- Language: nyuwǎ Ɓúúrák

Burak (Ɓúúrák) is an Adamawa language spoken by the Burak people in Nigeria. The main settlement of the Burak, in the northern foothills of the Chonge-Mona Range, is called "Burak" by others but "Tiire" by its inhabitants. Estimates based on the census of 1991 give about 4,634 people living in the Burak Village Area. Other settlements where significant numbers of Burak people live include Looyii, Layara, Daajelum, Taljwi, Pirim, Nyuaabwetek, Nyuaafiikum, and Dikadit. The last of these was once the main settlement of the Burak.

Religiously, the Burak traditionally practice ancestor veneration, in a similar manner to the Pero.
