= Kulango language =

Gur language

Kulango
- Nkuraeng
- Region: Ivory Coast, Ghana
- Ethnicity: Kulango people
- Native speakers: 470,000 (2021)
- Language family: Niger–Congo?: Atlantic–Congo; Savannas; Gur?; Kulango–Lorhon; Kulango

Language codes
- ISO 639-3: Either: nku – Bouna kzc – Bondoukou
- Glottolog: kula1277

Kulango is a Niger–Congo language spoken in Ivory Coast and across the border in Ghana. It is one of the Kulango languages, and it may be classified as a Gur language. There are two principal varieties distinct enough to be considered separate languages: the Kulango of Bondoukou (Bonduku), also known as Goutougo locally, and that of Bouna (Buna). Ethnologue reports that Bouna-dialect speakers understand Bondoukou, but not the reverse. Bouna, in addition, has the subdialects Sekwa and Nabanj. In Ghana, the principal towns in which the language is spoken are Badu and Seikwa, both in the Tain District, and Buni in the Jaman North district, all in the Bono region of Ghana. In addition, there are smaller towns and villages closer to Wenchi in the Bono region and Techiman in the Bono East region where this language is spoken. Among these are Asubingya (Asubinja) and Nkonsia. The Koulango are matrilineal like the Akans and possess similar cultural practices.

Writing by Francis Kofi Mensah from Badu Tain District Bono Region Ghana.

Variations of the name 'Kulango' include Koulango, Kolango, Kulange, Nkorang, Nkurange, Nkoramfo, Nkuraeng, and Kulamo; alternative names are Lorhon, Ngwela, and Babé.
