= Lomakka language =

Gur language of Ivory Coast

Loma
- Lomakka
- Region: Ivory Coast
- Ethnicity: Lomapo
- Native speakers: (8,000 cited 2000)
- Language family: Niger–Congo?: Atlantic–Congo?; Gur languages?; Kulango–Lorhon; Loma

Language codes
- ISO 639-3: loi
- Glottolog: loma1258

Loma or Lomakka (also Lomasse, or—ambiguously—Malinke) is a Gur language of Ivory Coast.
