= Bikwin–Jen languages =

Adamawa language branch of Nigeria

Bikwin–Jen
- Jen
- Geographic distribution: Taraba State, eastern Nigeria
- Linguistic classification: Niger–Congo?: Atlantic–Congo; Savannas; ? Bambukic; Bikwin–Jen

Language codes
- Glottolog: None bikw1235 Bikwin–Jen

The Bikwin–Jen or simply the Jen languages form a branch of the Adamawa family. They are spoken in and around Karim Lamido LGA (to the north of Jalingo LGA) in Taraba State, and in other nearby states of eastern Nigeria.

Bikwin-Jen may not necessarily be a coherent group. Due to the internal diversity of Bikwin-Jen, Guldemann (2018) suggests that Bikwin and Jen could form separate groups.

== Classification ==
Norton & Othaniel (2020) and Norton (2019) refer to Bikwin–Jen simply as Jen. Kleinewillinghöfer (2015) uses the name Bikwin–Jen.

=== Kleinewillinghöfer (2015) ===
Kleinewillinghöfer (2015) classifies the Bikwin-Jen group as follows in the Adamawa Languages Project website.

Bikwin-Jen

- Bikwin
  - Burak-Loo
    - Burak [ɓʋʋrak]
    - Loo [shʋŋɔ]
  - Mak-Tal
    - Mak (LeeMak)
      - Panya
      - Zoo
    - Maɣdi (Tala)
  - Bikwin (proper)
    - Leelau (Munga Leelau)
    - Mɔɔ (Gomu)
    - Kya̰k (Bambuka)
- Jen (Janjo)
  - Dza
    - Dza (local variants)
    - Joole, Jaule
  - Munga Doso
  - Tha [θá]

=== Norton & Othaniel (2020) ===
Classification of the Jen languages by Norton & Othaniel (2020):

- Jen
  - - Burak-Loo
    - Maghdi, Mak
  - - Kyak-Moo-Leelau
    - - Tha
      - Doso-Dza

Language names, ISO codes, and autonyms of the Jen languages (Norton & Othaniel 2020):

ISO 639-3 code	Language name	Autonym(s)
bys	Burak	[ɓʊ̄ːrɑ̀k]
ldo	Loo (Shungo Galdemaru, Shungo Waamura, Tadam)	[ʃʊ̀ŋɔ́]; [lō] ‘head’
gmd	Maghdi (Tala)	[mɑ̀kdī], [mɑ̂ɣdī]
pbl	Mak (Lee Mak) of Panya and Zoo	[mɑ̀k], [lè mɑ̀k] ‘they (of) Mak’
bka	Kyak (Bambuka)	[kjɑ᷅ k̃ ]
gwg	Moo (Gomu)	[mɔ̄]
ldk	Leelau (Munga Leelau)	[lê ləù] ‘road (to) Lau’
mko	Munga Doso	[mɨŋɡɑ̃ dɔsɔ] ‘river original’
jen	Dza of Jen and Joole	[i-d͡zə] (d͡zə ‘reed plant sp.’)
thy	Tha (Joole Manga)	[ðə̀], [ɲwɑ́ ðɑ́] (ɲwɑ́ ‘mouth’)

Norton & Othaniel (2020) also reconstruct more than 250 words for Proto-Jen.

=== Norton (2019) ===
Jen cluster classification according to Norton (2019):

- Jen
- Burak, Loo
- Maghdi, LeeMak
- Kyak-Moo-LeeLau (Munga LeeLau)
- Tha (Joole Manga)
- Doso-Dza (Munga Doso; Dza-Joole)

Language varieties that are part of the Jen cluster according to Norton (2019):

Jen cluster

- Burak
- Loo of Galdemaru and Waamura
- Maghdi (Tala)
- Mak (LeeMak) of Panya and Zoo
- Kyãk (Bambuka)
- Moo (Gomu)
- LeeLau (Munga LeeLau)
- Munga Doso
- Dza (Jenjo) and Joole
- Tha (Joole Manga)

== Names and locations ==
Below is a list of language names, populations, and locations from Blench (2019).

Language	Branch	Cluster	Dialects	Alternate spellings	Own name for language	Endonym(s)	Other names (location-based)	Other names for language	Exonym(s)	Speakers	Location(s)
Tha	Bikwin-Jen										Taraba State, Karim Lamido LGA and Adamawa State, Numan LGA. Joole Manga Dìdí village
Dza	Jen			Dza, Ja	nnwa’ Dzâ	Èédzá, ídzà	Jenjo, Janjo, Jen			6,100 (1952). Figures for Dza may include other Jen groups such as Joole and Tha (q.v.)	
Joole	Jen				èèʒìì	nwá èèʒìì					Taraba State, Karim Lamido LGA and Adamawa State, Numan LGA. Along the Benue River.
Mingang Doso	Jen			Munga	ŋwai Mәngàn	Mingang Doso	Dosọ				Taraba State, Karim Lamido LGA. 15 km. East of Karim Lamido town. One village and associated hamlets.
Burak	Bikwin				yu Ɓuurak pl. yele Ɓuurak	nyuwǎ Ɓúúrák	‘Yele		Shongom [name of an LGA]	4,000 (1992 est.)	Gombe State, Shongom LGA, Burak town. 25 villages. A highly distinctive form is spoken in Tadam village.
Kyak	Bikwin				Kyãk	Kyãk	Bambuka			10,000 (SIL)	Taraba State, Karim Lamido LGA, Bambuka
Leelạu	Bikwin			Lelo			Munga			One village and an associated hamlet	Taraba State, Karim Lamido LGA. 15 km. East of Karim Lamido town.
Loo	Bikwin				Shúŋ̣ ó ̣	Shúŋ̣ ó–̣ North, Shúŋ̣ ó–̣ South				8,000 (1992 est.)	Kaltungo LGA, Gombe State, Taraba State, Karim Lamido LGA. 30 km. North of Karim Lamido town. Lo village and associated hamlets.
Maghdi	Bikwin				Mághdì	Mághdì sg., lee Mághdì pl.		Widala also applies to Kholok		Fewer than 2,000 (1992)	Taraba State, Karim Lamido LGA. A section of the Widala
Mak	Bikwin		Panya, Zo		Mak	LeeMak	Panya, Panyam (From Poonya, the name of a founding hero) Zoo				Taraba State, Karim Lamido LGA. 15 km. north of Karim Lamido town.
Mɔɔ	Bikwin				ŋwaa Mɔ́ɔ̀	yáá Mɔ̀ɔ̀	Gwomo, Gwom, Gwomu, Gomu				Taraba State, Karim Lamido LGA

== See also ==
- Proto-Jen reconstructions (Wiktionary)
