= Loron people =

West African ethnic group

The Loron people, variously named Lorhon, Tenbo, Teguessie and Thuuna, are an ethnic group located in the forested savannah region of northeast Ivory Coast and southwest Burkina Faso. They came originally from the Bouna region of Ivory Coast. There are approximately 10,000 Loron people. Their language, which is called Téén, is 45% cognate with that of the Kulango language in the Bouna area, although their culture reflects that of the Lobi people.

== Background ==
Around 250 years ago, when many Loron people were killed in warfare with other tribal groups from the south of Ivory Coast, the Loron fled the Bouna region. They moved north along the Mounhoun/Black Volta river, and then west, and settled in the area that is now the town of Gaoua, Burkina Faso, about 160 kilometres (100 mi) from Bouna, Ivory Coast.

When the Lobi people moved into the Gaoua area from Ghana in the late 18th century, the Loron, like most other smaller ethnic groups in the region, adopted many of the customs of the dominant and more numerous Lobis. Although, to this day, the Loron people are still considered the ‘Owners of the Land’ in the Gaoua area.

To avoid conflict with their neighbouring tribes the relatively timid Loron went in search of new pastures. Most of the Loron people gradually migrated south, to the mountains which form the border between Burkina Faso and Ivory Coast, just south of the Lobi town of Kampti. Approximately 100 years ago a large group of Loron people moved further south, out of the mountainous region, and settled in a more fertile area in Ivory Coast between Doropo and Tehini. This all happened, of course, before country demarcation lines were created by the French colonialists.

== Location ==
The Lorhon/Loron people are now concentrated mainly in the Sub-Prefecture of Tehini in northeast Ivory Coast; and the province of Poni in southwest Burkina Faso. Approximately 70% of the Loron live in Ivory Coast, and 30% in Burkina Faso. The Loron in Ivory Coast are scattered over an area of about 5,200 km^{2} (2,000 sq mi), just north of the Comoé National Park. In Burkina they are located mainly in the mountain area between Kampti and the Ivory Coast border. Around 5% of the Loron, mostly young Loron males, live and work on the cocoa and coffee plantations of southern Ivory Coast. They usually spend 1–2 years there, before returning to marry and settle down in their natal village.

== Lifestyle ==
The vast majority of Loron people are subsistence farmers, living in small villages of between 50 and 100 people. Families normally live in homesteads separated from other families by small planting areas. As with the Lobi people, ‘Two reaches of an arrow’ represents an appropriate distance between two Loron family homesteads. The Loron in both Ivory Coast and Burkina Faso are probably among the least developed people groups in their respective countries. They normally live in isolated areas with little or no access to schools, medical facilities, or potable water.

The Loron people are animist in the sense that they believe that the inanimate objects that they create represent the spirit world. They fabricate fetishes, or idols, (punibo) from wood, clay or metal. Appeasing the demands of these ‘gods’ dominate every aspect of their lives. They believe Nyelye – God/sky created everything, but that ‘it’ has no further interest in people. They believe that a wide range of supernatural beings and invisible spiritual powers control and shape their lives. The Loron people offer sacrifices to their idols to ensure, among other things, an adequate food supply, protection from the spirits which can harm or kill, healthy children and harmony in the community. They have many taboos and rituals which they need to respect throughout their lives in order to avoid sickness, death or misfortune.
