= Bena–Mboi languages =

Adamawa language branch of Nigeria

Ɓəna–Mboi
- Yungur
- Geographic distribution: Adamawa State, eastern Nigeria
- Linguistic classification: Niger–Congo?: Atlantic–Congo; Savannas; ? Bambukic; Ɓəna–Mboi
- Subdivisions: Ɓəna; Mboi; Kaan

Language codes
- Glottolog: bena1258

The Bena–Mboi (Ɓəna–Mboi) a.k.a. Yungur languages form a branch of the Adamawa family. They are spoken in central Adamawa State, eastern Nigeria, just to the east of Lafia LGA.

Idiatov & van de Velde (2019) classify the Bena–Mboi languages as Benue-Congo.

== Classification ==
In the Adamawa Languages Project website, Kleinewillinghöfer (2011) classifies the Ɓəna-Mboi or Yungur group as follows.

Ɓəna-Mboi (Yungur)

- Ɓəna
  - Ɓəna Yungur
    - Ɓəna Yungur
    - Voro
  - Ɓəna Lala
    - Ɓəna Lala of Yang
    - Ɓəna Lala of Bodwai (Bodɛ)
      - Robma
      - (Robma of) Dingai
- Mboi (Gəna)
  - Mboi of Livo; Mboi of Gulungo
  - Mboi of Haanda; Mboi of Banga
- Kaan (Libo)

== Names and locations ==
Below is a list of language names, populations, and locations from Blench (2019).

Language	Branch	Cluster	Dialects	Alternate spellings	Own name for language	Endonym(s)	Other names (location-based)	Other names for language	Exonym(s)	Speakers	Location(s)
Ɓena	Yungur		Ɓəna is divided into 17 clans each of which is said to have a distinct speech-form, but they are too closely related to actually be distinct dialects.	Ebina, Binna, Gbinna	Ebəna	Ɓəna	Lala (not recommended), Purra (general term for northern Ɓəna)	Yungur, Yangur	Yungirba, Yungur	44,300 (1963) probably including Lala and Roba; fewer than 100,000 (1990 est.)	Adamawa State, Song and Guyuk LGAs
Kaan	Yungur						Libo				Adamawa State, Guyuk LGA
Lala cluster	Yungur	Lala				Ɓəna				30,000 (SIL); 44,300 with Ɓəna (1963)	Adamawa State, Guyuk, Song and Gombi LGAs
Yang	Yungur	Lala		Yan				Lalla			
Roba	Yungur	Lala					Gworam				
Ebode	Yungur	Lala		Ẹbode							
Mboi cluster	Yungur	Mboi		Mboire, Mboyi						3,200 (1973 SIL)	Adamawa State, Song LGA
Gana	Yungur	Mboi		Gəna			Mboire, Mboyi			1,800 (LA 1971)	Adamawa State, Song LGA, northwest of Song. Livo village and associated hamlets
Banga	Yungur	Mboi									Adamawa State, Song LGA, west of Loko. Banga village and associated hamlets
Haanda	Yungur	Mboi		Handa						1,370 (LA 1971)	Adamawa State, Song LGA, west of Loko. Handa village and associated hamlets
Voro	Yungur			Vɔrɔ	Ebəna, Ebina	Ɓena	Woro	Yungur			Adamawa State, Song and Guyuk LGAs, south of the Dumne road. Waltande and associated hamlets.
