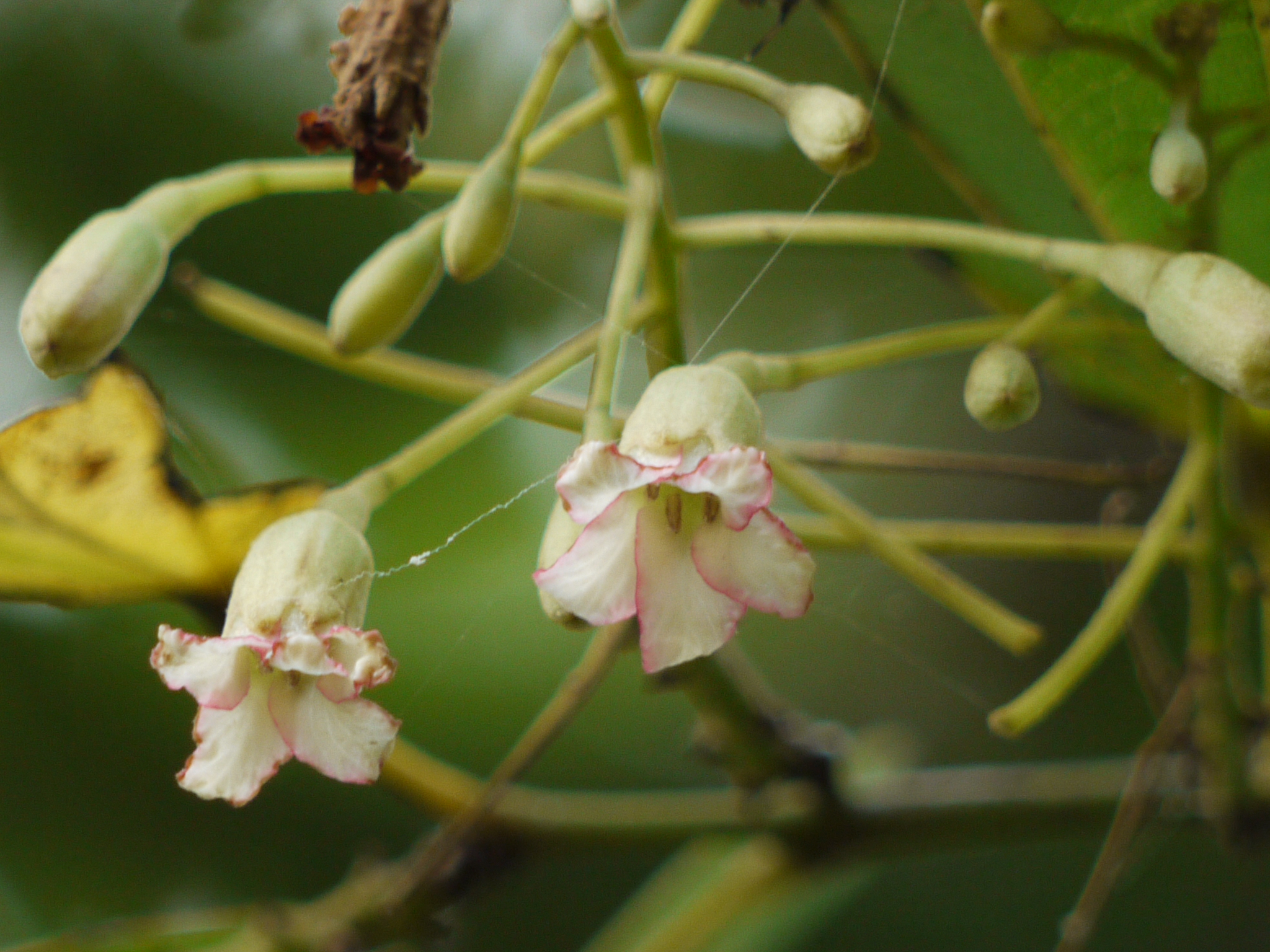

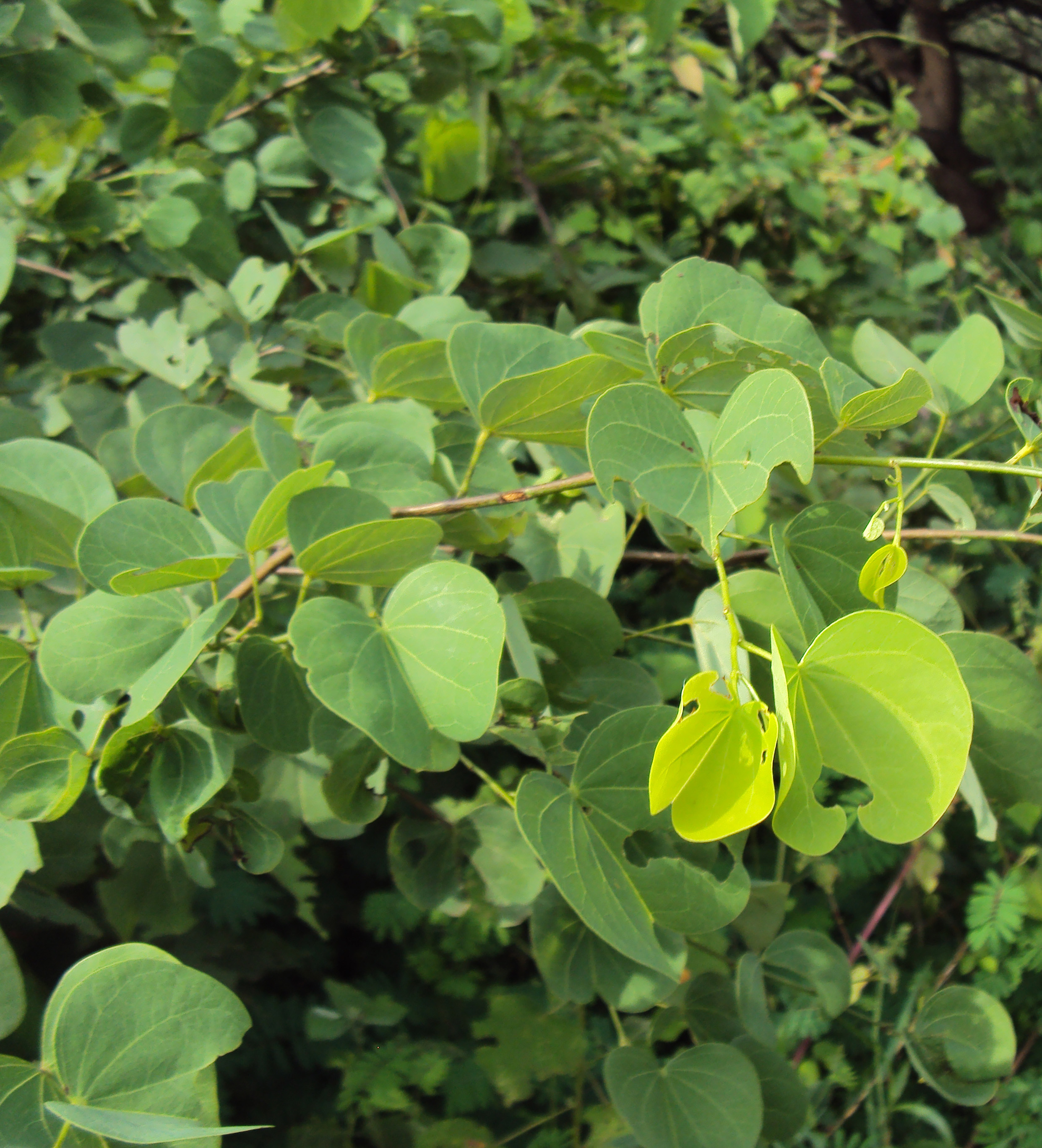

Conservation status
- Least Concern (IUCN 3.1)

Scientific classification
- Kingdom: Plantae
- Clade: Tracheophytes
- Clade: Angiosperms
- Clade: Eudicots
- Clade: Rosids
- Order: Fabales
- Family: Fabaceae
- Subfamily: Cercidoideae
- Tribe: Bauhinieae
- Genus: Piliostigma
- Species: P. malabaricum

Binomial name
- Piliostigma malabaricum (Roxb.)Benth.

Synonyms
- Bauhinia malabarica

= Piliostigma malabaricum =

Species of legume

Piliostigma malabaricum is a small (sometimes ornamental) tree species in the family Fabaceae. It was previously placed in the genus Bauhinia, but names changed with reorganisation of the subfamily Cercidoideae and the tribe Bauhinieae.

This species is native to Tropical Asia and N. Australia; it has been called the "Purple Orchid Tree" (although not to be confused with Bauhinia purpurea or Bauhinia variegata) and names in Vietnamese are: chân trâu and móng bò tai voi. There are no intraspecific names according to Plants of the World Online.
