= Mboi language =

Adamawa language spoken in Nigeria

Mboi
- Gena
- Native to: Nigeria
- Region: Adamawa State
- Native speakers: (19,000 cited 1992)
- Language family: Niger–Congo?: Atlantic–Congo; Bambukic; Yungur; Mboi
- Dialects: Gəna (Mboi); Banga; Handa

Language codes
- ISO 639-3: moi
- Glottolog: mboi1246

Mboi (Mboire, Mboyi) is an Adamawa language of Nigeria. Its name is that of one of its dialects, the other two being Banga and Handa. These are rather divergent, Blench (2004) considers them to be distinct languages.

Blench (2019) lists Gana, Banga, and Haanda as language varieties that are part of the Mboi cluster.
