= Voro language (Adamawa) =

Niger-Congo language

Voro
- Yungur
- Native to: Nigeria
- Region: Adamawa State
- Language family: Niger–Congo?: Atlantic–Congo; Bambukic; Yungur; Yungur–Roba; Voro

Language codes
- ISO 639-3: vor
- Glottolog: voro1240

Voro (Vɔrɔ, a.k.a. Bena, Buna, Ebina, Ebuna, Woro, Yungur) is an Adamawa language of Nigeria.
