= Kim language =

Mbum language spoken in Chad

Kim
- Native to: Chad
- Ethnicity: Kim
- Native speakers: (15,000 cited 1993 census)
- Language family: Niger–Congo?: Atlantic–Congo; Mbum–Day; Kim languages; Kim
- Dialects: Garap; Gerep; Kolop; Kosop

Language codes
- ISO 639-3: kia
- Glottolog: kimm1246
- ELP: Kim

The Kim language of southern Chad is an Mbum language spoken by 15,000 people. It is one of the three members of the Kim languages group, together with Besme and Goundo.

The language was once mistakenly classified as Chadic, and called Masa, a Chadic name.

There is strong dialectical divergence; Blench considers Garap (Éré), Gerep (Djouman, Jumam), Kolop (Kilop, Kolobo), and Kosop (Kwasap, Kim) to be distinct languages.

== Kim people ==
The Kim are a people of Chad, who mainly inhabit four villages in the Mayo-Kebbi Est region. The 1993 RGPH census reported a total population of 15,354 in Chad.

Principal economic activities include cultivation of finger millet, taro, and rice, fishing, and pottery.

The Kim are mainly Christians (c. 65%), but many of them also profess their own tribal beliefs (c. 35%).
