= Kaan language =

Adamawa language of Nigeria

Kaan
- Libo
- Native to: Nigeria
- Region: Adamawa State
- Native speakers: (10,000 cited 1992)
- Language family: Niger–Congo?: Atlantic–Congo; Bambukic; Yungur; Kaan

Language codes
- ISO 639-3: ldl
- Glottolog: kaan1247

Kaan, or Libo, is an Adamawa language of Nigeria.
