= Nyingwom language =

Niger-Congo language of eastern Nigeria

Nyingwom
- Kam
- Àngwɔ̀m
- Pronunciation: [ɲí ŋwɔ̀m]
- Region: eastern Nigeria
- Native speakers: (5,000 cited 1993)
- Language family: Niger–Congo?: Atlantic–Congo; Savanna; Nyingwom

Language codes
- ISO 639-3: kdx
- Glottolog: kamm1249

Nyí ŋwɔ̀m
- Person: nyí ŋwɔ̀m
- Country: àbìbì nyí ŋwɔ̀m

The Nyingwom or Kam language is a Niger-Congo language spoken in eastern Nigeria. Blench (2019) lists speakers residing in the main villages of Mayo Kam and Kamajim in Bali LGA, Taraba State. Lesage reports that Kam is spoken in 27 villages of Bali LGA.

Nyingwom was labeled as branch "G8" in Joseph Greenberg's Adamawa language family proposal. The precise classification of Kam is a matter of current research.

Speakers refer to themselves and their language as Nyí ŋwɔ̀m. Kamajim (Kam: àngwɔ́g ɲí 'house of the people') is the traditional capital of the Kam at the western foothills of a mountain range situated to the north of the Kam River. The Kam have historically been in extensive contact with the Kororofa Jukun.

== Distribution ==
Kam or Nyingwom is spoken by approximately fewer than 5,000 speakers in the settlements of:

- Sarkin Dawa (70)
- Mayo Kam (150)
- Garin Hamza (700)
- Din Kamaajin A, B, C, D (3,000)
- Garin Laa (300)
- Garin Bandari (300)

However, Jakob Lesage estimates 20,000-25,000 speakers in 27 villages in May 2017.

Unlike many other Niger-Congo languages, Kam does not have a noun class system.

== Phonology ==
Consonants
	Labial	Alveolar	Palatal	Velar	Labiovelar	Glottal
Plosive	p b	t d	tʃ dʒ	k g	kp gb	
Fricative	f v	s z	ʃ			h
Nasal	m	n	ɲ	ŋ		
Approximant	w	r, l				

Vowels
	Front	Central	Back
High	i ĩ	ɨ	u
Mid-high	e ẽ		o õ
Mid-low	ɛ		ɔ
Low		a ã	

Additionally, Nyingwom has six tones; high, mid, low, rising, falling, and high-falling.
