= Bambuka language =

Bikwin language spoken in Nigeria

Kyãk
- Bambuka
- Native to: Nigeria
- Region: Taraba State
- Native speakers: 10,000 (2019)
- Language family: Niger–Congo?: Atlantic–Congo; Bambukic; Bikwin–Jen; Bikwin; Gomu–Leelau–Kyak; Kyãk

Language codes
- ISO 639-3: bka
- Glottolog: kyak1243

Kyãk (Nyakyak), also known as Bambuka after its location, is a Bikwin (Adamawa) language of Nigeria.

Blench lists Kanawa as a possible separate language.
