= Longuda people =

Nigerian Tribe

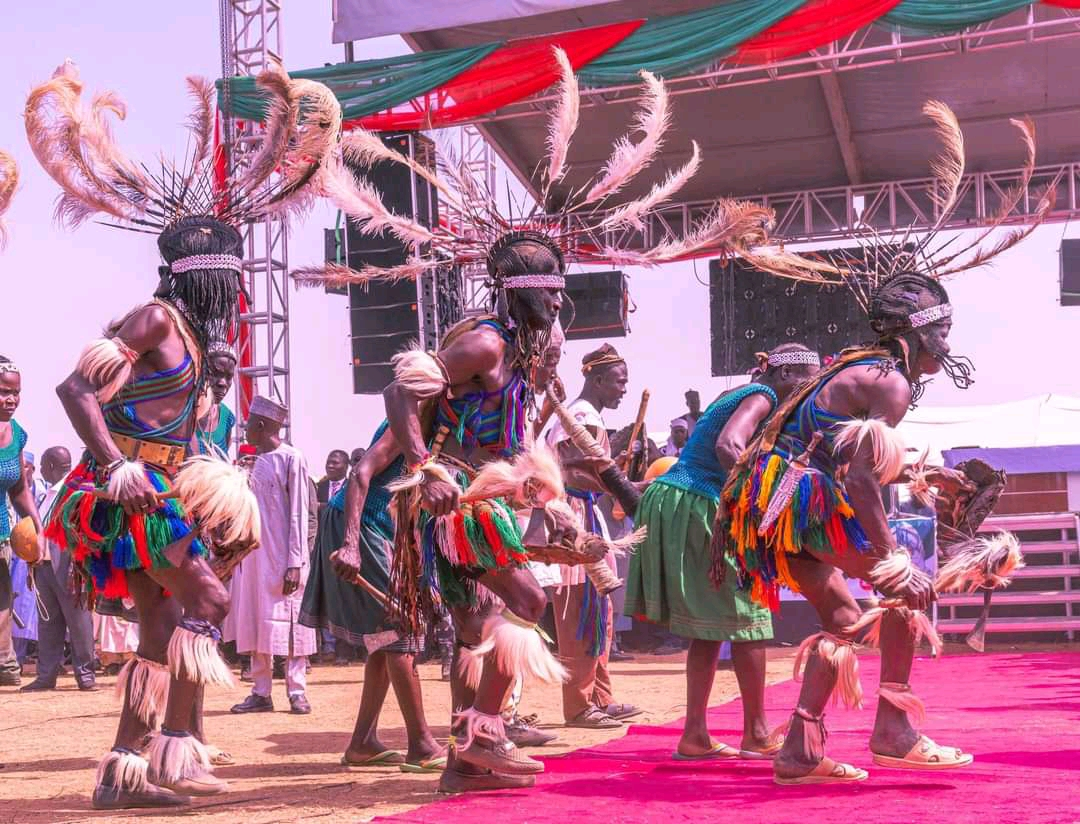
Lunguda cultural troupe from Adamawa State

The Longuda or Lunguda are a West African ethnic group living in Adamawa and Gombe States in northeastern Nigeria. They are the only known matriarchal tribe in Nigeria. The Lunguda consider matrilineal descent in many aspects of their social organisation more important than the patrilineal descent. Clan membership may even be counted on the mother line. This custom is not found with their other neighbors or in other tribes of Nigeria.

== History and geography ==
The Longuda rulers default to the Kanuri style. The seat of the traditional ruler is in Guyuk, Adamawa State. According to oral tradition, the Longuda parted from the Kanuri in Borno State.

== Cuisine ==
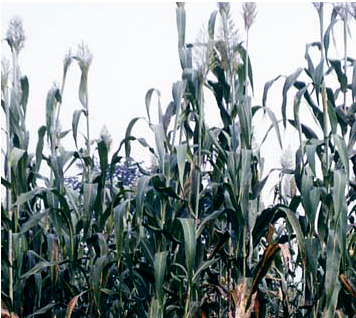
Guinea Corn (Sorghum bicolor)

Traditionally, the staple crop of the Longuda is Guinea Corn (Sorghum bicolor). This used to be grounded on stone hand mill and cooked into a thick paste, "tuwo", then eaten with vegetable soup. Today, however, rice, maize, and millet form part of the staple of the Longuda. Guinea Corn still remains the dominant crop grown by the Longuda.

== Marriage ==
The Longuda are primarily polygamous. The different dialects of the Longuda people perform marriage rites differently. Traditionally, a young man courting a woman invited his friends on the night he wished to take her as his bride, without her prior knowledge. The man and his friends would abduct the woman to his cottage, often a forceful act. Once the woman spent a night in his cottage, his family and hers considered them married. The bride price was usually paid afterwards. This abduction, which usually took place in the night, was not without resistance. The other young men in the woman's neighborhood would attempt to come to her rescue, and a free-for-all fight would ensue. The intending groom and his company usually had to win the duel in order to take the bride-to-be.

However, in recent times, the influence of Christianity and cultural assimilation of neighboring societies have altered this practice. A watered-down version of this is still widely used. In this case, a man asks a woman for her consent, the woman agrees, and on an arranged night, the groom's friends and bride's friends secretly picks her and her clothing up from her parents' house, goes over to spend the night in the groom's uncle's house, leaving behind a token at the position where they used to sit during courtship and that seals the union. Taking her clothes along with her is her indication to everyone that she has agreed to marry the man.

== Publications ==
Newman, Bonnie. 1976. "Deep and surface structure of the Longuda clause."
Newman, Bonnie. 1978. "The Longuda verb."
Newman, John F. 1978. "Participant orientation in Longuda folk tales."
Newman, John F. and Bonnie Newman. 1974. "Longuda."
Newman, John F. and Bonnie Newman. 1977. Longuda dialect survey.
Newman, John F. and Bonnie Newman. 1977. Longuda phonology.
