= Loo language =

Adamawa language of Nigeria

Loo
- Shụŋọ
- Native to: Nigeria
- Region: Gombe State, Taraba State
- Native speakers: (8,000 cited 1992)
- Language family: Niger–Congo?: Atlantic–Congo; Bambukic; Bikwin–Jen; Bikwin; Burak–Loo; Loo

Language codes
- ISO 639-3: ldo
- Glottolog: looo1238

Loo, or Shụŋọ, is an Adamawa language of Nigeria. It is one of the more than 500 native languages spoken in that country. As of 1992, the approximate number of Loo speakers was 8,000. Those speakers reside in parts of Gombe State and also the adjacent state to the south: Taraba State.
