= Adamawa–Ubangi languages =

Language family

Adamawa–Ubangi
- (obsolete)
- Geographic distribution: West and Central Africa
- Native speakers: (undated figure of 12 million)
- Linguistic classification: Niger–Congo?: Atlantic–Congo; Adamawa–Ubangi
- Subdivisions: Adamawa; Ubangian

Language codes
- ISO 639-3: –
- Glottolog: adam1258

The Adamawa–Ubangi languages are a geographic grouping and formerly postulated family of languages spoken in Nigeria, Chad, the Central African Republic, Cameroon, Gabon, the Republic of the Congo, the Democratic Republic of the Congo and South Sudan, by a total of about 12 million people.

== History of classification ==
The family was proposed by Joseph Greenberg in The Languages of Africa under the name Adamawa–Eastern as a primary branch of the Niger–Congo family, which is in turn divided in two branches, Adamawa (e.g. Niellim) and Ubangian (e.g. Azande (Zande language), Ngbandi, on which the creole Sango is based). Kleinewillinghöfer (2014) believes that the Adamawa languages are most closely related to the Gur languages, although the unity of both the Gur and the Adamawa branch is frequently questioned. Roger Blench replaced Adamawa–Ubangi with a Savannas family, which includes Gur, Ubangian and the various branches of Adamawa as primary nodes. Dimmendaal (2008) doubts that Ubangian is a subfamily of Niger–Congo at all, preferring to classify it as an independent family until proven otherwise.

== Demographics ==
The Adamawa languages are among the least studied in Africa, and include many endangered languages; by far the largest of the nearly one hundred small Adamawa languages is Mumuye, at 400,000 speakers. A couple of unclassified languages—notably Laal and Jalaa—are found along their fringes. Ubangian languages, while nearly as numerous, are somewhat better studied; one in particular, Sango, a Ngbandi-based creole, has become a major trade language of Central Africa.

== Linguistic features ==
Adamawa–Ubangi languages often have partial vowel harmony, involving restrictions on the co-occurrence of vowels in a word.

As in most branches of the Niger–Congo family, noun class systems are widespread. Adamawa–Ubangi languages are notable for having noun class suffixes rather than prefixes. The noun class system is no longer fully productive in all languages.

Adamawa subject pronouns (Boyd 1989) were originally approximately:

- "I": *mi or *ma
- "you (sg.)": *mo
- "you (pl.): *u, *ui, *i (+n?)

The third person pronouns vary widely.

In possessive constructions, the possessed typically precedes the possessor, and sentence order is usually subject–verb–object.

== Classification ==
In Williamson and Blench (2000), since abandoned, the internal classification was:

- Proto‑Adamawa‑Ubangi
  - Adamawa
    - - Leko
      - Duru
      - Mumuye/Yendang
      - Nimbari
    - - Mbum
      - Bua
      - Kim
      - Day
    - - Waja
      - Longuda
      - Jen
      - Bikwin
      - Yungur
    - Ba (=Kwa)
    - Kam
    - ?
      Fali
  - Ubangi
    - Gbaya
    - - Banda
      - Ngbandi
      - - Sere
        - - Ngabaka
          - Mba
    - Zande
