= Lorhon language =

Gur language of Ivory Coast

Lorhon
- Téén
- Region: Ivory Coast, Burkina Faso
- Ethnicity: Ténbó
- Native speakers: (8,000 cited 1991–1999)
- Language family: Niger–Congo?: Atlantic–Congo; Gur?; Kulango–Lorhon; Lorhon

Language codes
- ISO 639-3: lor
- Glottolog: teen1242

- Person: Ténsé
- People: Ténbó
- Language: Téén

Lorhon, or Teen, is a Gur language of Ivory Coast and across the border in Burkina Faso.

As with Doghose, there are spelling variants to accommodate the sound [ɣ]: Loghon, Lorhon, Loron. Other names are Nabe, Tegesie, Ténhé, and Tuni.

== Phonology ==
=== Consonants ===
Consonants
		Labial	Alveolar	Palatal	Velar	Labial- velar	Glottal
Plosive	voiceless	p	t	c	k	k͡p	
Plosive	phar.	pˤ					
Plosive	voiced	b	d	ɟ	g	g͡b	
Trill			r				
Nasal		m	n	ɲ		ŋ͡m	
Fricative	voiceless	f	s		x		h
Fricative	voiced	v	z				
Approximant	plain		l	j		w	
Approximant	phar.		lˤ	jˤ		wˤ	

=== Vowels ===
Vowels
	Front	Back	
	Front	unrounded	rounded
Close	i		u
Near-close	ɪ		ʊ
Mid	e		o
Near-open	ɛ	ʌ	ɔ
Open	a		
