= Oblo language =

Language of Cameroon

Oblo
- Region: Cameroon
- Native speakers: Nearly extinct
- Language family: Niger–Congo?: Savannas?; (unclassified); Oblo
- Writing system: Unwritten

Language codes
- ISO 639-3: obl
- Glottolog: oblo1238
- ELP: Oblo

Oblo is a poorly attested, unclassified, and possibly extinct language of northern Cameroon. It is, or was, spoken in a tiny area including Gobtikéré, Ouro Bé, and Ouro Badjouma, in Pitoa, Bénoué Department.

Eldridge Mohammadou located Olbo around Bé, at the confluence of the Benue River and Kebi River, in Bibemi commune. However, ALCAM (2012), following Ethnologue, reports that Oblo was spoken near Tcholliré in Mayo-Rey department, Northern Region. Oblo is known only from eight words collected by Kurt Strümpell in the early 1900s.

Oblo has been classified as one of the Adamawa languages, but it has not been included in recent classifications. It might be best left unclassified altogether.
