= Volta–Congo languages =

Major branch of the Atlantic–Congo languages

Volta–Congo
- Geographic distribution: West Africa
- Linguistic classification: ? Niger–Congo: Atlantic–Congo; Volta–Congo
- Subdivisions: ? Senufo (sometimes considered Savanna); Savannas (aka Gur-Adamawa); Kwa; Volta–Niger; Benue–Congo (includes Bantu languages); Fali; Pɛrɛ (also spelled Pre); Ukaan (sometimes considered Benue–Congo); Ega (sometimes considered Kwa)

Language codes
- Glottolog: volt1241
- The Volta–Congo languages shown within the Niger–Congo language family. Non-Volta–Congo languages are greyscale.

Volta–Congo is a major branch of the Atlantic–Congo family. It includes all Atlantic–Congo except the families of the erstwhile Atlantic and Kordofanian branches and possibly Senufo.

In the infobox at the right, the languages which appear to be the most divergent (including the dubious Senufo) are placed at the top, whereas those closer to the core (the similar "Benue–Kwa" branches of Kwa, Volta–Niger and Benue–Congo) are near the bottom. If the Kwa or Savannas branches prove to be invalid, the tree will be even more crowded.

== Classification ==
Comparative linguistic research by John M. Stewart in the sixties and seventies helped establish the genetic unity of Volta–Congo and shed light on its internal structure, but the results remain tentative. Williamson and Blench (2000) note that in many cases it is difficult to draw clear lines between the branches of Volta–Congo and suggest that this might indicate the diversification of a dialect continuum rather than a clear separation of families. This had been suggested before by Bennet (1983 as cited in Williamson and Blench 2000:17) in the case of the Gur and Adamawa–Ubangi languages, which apart from Ubangian are now linked together as Savannas. Other branches are Kwa and Benue–Congo, which includes the well-known and particularly numerous Bantu group. The relationship of Kwa to Benue–Congo (named Benue–Kwa), and the eastern and western branches of Benue–Congo to each other, remain obscure.

The vowel systems of Volta–Congo languages have been the subject of much historical comparative linguistic debate. Casali (1995) defends the hypothesis that Proto-Volta–Congo had a nine- or ten-vowel system employing vowel harmony and that this set has been reduced to a seven vowel-system in many Volta–Congo languages. The Ghana–Togo Mountain languages are examples of languages where nine- or ten-vowel systems are still found.

== See also ==
- Languages of Africa
- Language family
