= Mak language (Adamawa) =

Adamawa language spoken in Nigeria

Mak
- LeeMak
- Native to: Nigeria
- Region: Taraba State
- Ethnicity: Bikwin
- Native speakers: (5,700 cited 2000)
- Language family: Niger–Congo?: Atlantic–Congo; Bambukic; Bikwin–Jen; Bikwin; Mak
- Dialects: Panya; Zoo

Language codes
- ISO 639-3: pbl
- Glottolog: makn1235
- ELP: Mak (Nigeria)

Mak, or LeeMak, is an Adamawa language of Nigeria, one of several spoken by the Bikwin people. The two dialects, Panya and Zoo (Zo), are rather divergent, and might be considered distinct languages.

The Panya people live in Panya Village and the Zoo live in Zoo, both in present-day Karim Lamido Local Government Area of Taraba State.
