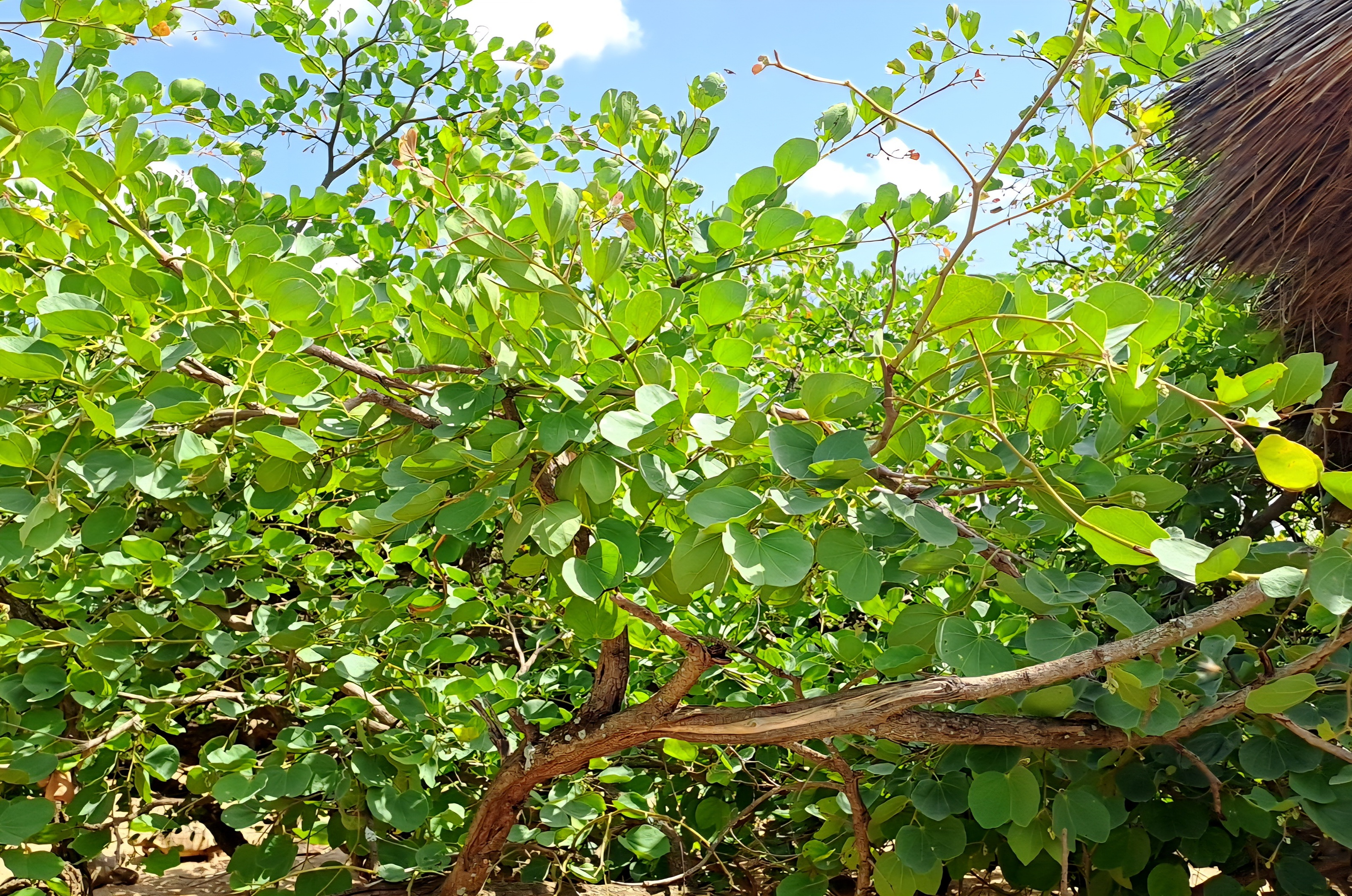

Scientific classification
- Kingdom: Plantae
- Clade: Tracheophytes
- Clade: Angiosperms
- Clade: Eudicots
- Clade: Rosids
- Order: Fabales
- Family: Fabaceae
- Genus: Piliostigma
- Species: P. reticulatum

Binomial name
- Piliostigma reticulatum (DC.) Hochst.

Synonyms
- Bauhinia reticulata DC.

= Piliostigma reticulatum =

Species of plant

Piliostigma reticulatum, also known as camel's foot, is a legume in the Cercidoideae subfamily. It occurs throughout western tropical Africa to Ethiopia.

The species has been shown to be useful as an intercrop for crops such as millet in the Sahel.

== Description ==
A perennial dioecious species, it is capable of growing up to 10 m tall. The plant has a deeply fissured to cracked grey bark and fibrous slash turning brown. It has alternate leaves that are bilobed in outline, the lobes are rounded to cuneate; leaf-blade is 5–11 cm long and 4–18 cm wide, petiole is 1-3.5 cm long, the leaf surface is leathery and glabrous. Inflorescence is either terminal or axillary panicles with white-pink striped flowers. Fruit is a glabrous pod.

== Distribution ==
Widespread in the Sudan and Sahel savannah regions of West Africa, east towards Sudan.

== Ecology ==
In West African Sahel environments, research identified that some cropped fields with Piliostigma reticulatum and Guiera senegalensis have better soil quality than fields without these shrubs, both species perform hydraulic redistribution, which helped improve soil fertility. Addition of Piliostigma reticulatum to mango seedlings helped with soil decomposition and mineralization of nutrients aiding the growth of mango seedlings in a rainfed community of the Sahel.

== Chemistry ==
Test on plant's extracts isolated the methylated flavonols, 6-C-methylquercetin-3-methyl ether, 6,8-di-C-methylkaempferol-3- methyl ether, and 6-C-methylquercetin-3,30 ,7-trimethyl ether. Leaves and fruits contains tartaric acid.

== Uses ==
Extracts of the species is used by locals as an antiseptic and to treat a variety of illnesses; root extracts are used by herbalists to treat diarrhea, gonorrhea, uterine pain, liver and gall pains while bark decoctions are used in the wound healing process. Extracts of leaves are used to treat a variety of issues including cough, bronchitis, and rheumatism.

The species is also noted as a forage stock in the Sahel region; leaves, pods and branches are sold by farmers to herders for cattle fodder.

A bark decoction is used in the dyeing process of bogolan cloths, while its fibrous bark is also used for tying roof rafters, basket and mat making. In Burkina Faso, young leaves are prepared, cooked and eaten.
