= Moo language =

Adamawa language spoken in Nigeria

Moo
- Gomu
- Native to: Nigeria
- Region: Taraba State
- Native speakers: (5,000 cited 1998)
- Language family: Niger–Congo?: Atlantic–Congo; Bambukic; Bikwin–Jen; Bikwin; Gomu–Leelau–Kyak; Moo

Language codes
- ISO 639-3: gwg
- Glottolog: mooo1239

Mɔɔ or Mọọ, known as Gomu (Gwomu) after its location, is a Bikwin (Adamawa) language spoken by about 5,000 people in Taraba State, Nigeria.
