= Fali languages (Cameroon) =

Languages of northern Cameroon

Fali
- Native to: Cameroon
- Region: North
- Ethnicity: Fali
- Native speakers: (35,000 cited 1982)
- Language family: Niger–Congo?: Atlantic–Congo; Fali

Language codes
- ISO 639-3: Either: fal – South Fali fll – North Fali
- Glottolog: adam1254

Fali comprises two languages spoken in northern Cameroon. Included in Greenberg's Adamawa languages (as group G11), it was excluded from that family by Boyd (1989). Roger Blench suspects it may represent one of the earlier lineages to have branched off the Atlantic–Congo stock.

== Varieties ==
According to Ethnologue 16, the two branches of Fali are "different," but it is not clear how distinct they are. Blench apparently treats them as half a dozen languages in two branches. South Fali has 20,000 speakers, with several dialects. North Fali, with 16,000 speakers, also has several dialects; North Fali speakers were "rapidly" shifting to Adamawa Fulfulde by 1982.

North Fali
Dourbeye (Fali-Dourbeye)
Bossum (Fali-Bossum)
Bvəri (Fali du Peske-Bori)
South Fali
Kaang (Fali Kangou)
Bele (Fali-Bele)
Fali-Tinguélin

The Nimbari language used to be spoken in the southern Fali area, but Nimbari people now speak Fali Kangou.

== See also ==
- List of Proto-Fali reconstructions (Wiktionary)
