= Leelau language =

Bikwin language of Nigeria

Leelau
- Yah Lelau
- Native to: Nigeria
- Region: Taraba State
- Ethnicity: Bikwin
- Native speakers: 11,000 (2025)
- Language family: Niger–Congo?: Atlantic–Congo; Bambukic; Bikwin–Jen; Bikwin; Gomu–Lelau–Kyak; Leelau

Language codes
- ISO 639-3: ldk
- Glottolog: leel1242

Lelau (Leelau, Lelo), or Munga after its location, is one of the Bikwin languages of the Bikwin people, spoken in Karim Lamido LGA, Taraba State, Nigeria.
