= Guyuk =

- LGA and town
- Interactive map of Guyuk
- Location in Nigeria
- Coordinates: 9°54′20″N 11°55′42″E
- Country: Nigeria
- State: Adamawa State

Area
  - Total: 764.6 km^{2} (295.2 sq mi)

Population (2022 estimate)
  - Total: 272,200
  - Density: 356.0/km^{2} (922.0/sq mi)

Guyuk is a town and Local Government Area in Adamawa State, Nigeria. Guyuk has many limestone deposits. Guyuk is located along the Numan–Biu road.

== Demography ==
=== Languages ===
In a 2023 demographic survey of Internally displaced persons (IDPs), the area was found to be predominantly Longuda. The most commonly reported languages (spoken at homes and places of primary residence) present in the local government area were; Longuda – 81.1%, Fulfulde, specifically Eastern or Adamawa Fulfulde – 7.1%, Hausa – 5.5%, Dera (Kanakuru) – 4.9%, Bura – 0.9% and Chamba Donga – 0.5%. This data was not obtained from a nationally co-ordinated population headcount. The last time Nigeria included ethnic and linguistic data in its enumeration parameters was in the national census of 1963.

== Climate ==
The rainy season in Guyuk is humid and overcast, whereas the dry season is hot and partially cloudy. Throughout the year, the temperature normally ranges from 17 °C (62 °F) to 39 °C (103 °F), with temperatures rarely falling below 14 °C (57 °F) or rising over 42 °C (108 °F).

=== Average Temperature ===
Guyuk experiences a period of high temperatures lasting 2.4 months, starting from February 6 and ending on April 18, during which the average daily high temperature remains above 37 °C (99 °F). March stands out as the hottest month of the year in Guyuk, with an average high of 39 °C (103 °F) and a low of 24 °C (75 °F).

On the other hand, the cooler season persists for 3.4 months, spanning from July 2 to October 13, with an average daily high temperature below 31 °C (88 °F). December marks the coldest month in Guyuk, characterized by an average low of 17 °C (62 °F) and a high of 34 °C (94 °F).

=== Cloud ===
In Guyuk, as autumn progresses, there is a notable reduction in cloud cover, with the portion of time when the sky is overcast or mostly cloudy declining from 71% to 56%.

The most unclouded day during the fall season is observed on November 26, featuring clear, mostly clear, or partly cloudy conditions approximately 44% of the time.

To provide context, on May 6, which is the cloudiest day of the year, the likelihood of overcast or mostly cloudy conditions reaches 80%, while on January 4, the clearest day of the year, there is a 57% chance of experiencing clear, mostly clear, or partly cloudy skies.

== Districts ==
- Bobini
- Banjiram
- Chikila
- Dukul
- Guyuk
- Dunma
- Bodeno
- Lokoro
- Purokayo
- Kola
- Sili

== Villages ==
- Arah
- Bodeno
- Dakiti
- Doma
- Dumburi Fulani
- Gadajuga
- Gargijik
- Gimakurje
- Gorotoro
- Jabi
- Kambila
- Katte
- Kukumli
- Labaram
- Lakati
- Libbo Dutse
- Mada
- Mittim
- Shumshi
- Vanera
- Wadafa
- Wawi
- Wurotuge
- Wuroyanka
- Gwalura
- Dangir
- .Lamza
- Zaunan-Bako
