= Mbum–Day languages =

Mbum–Day
- Geographic distribution: southern Chad, northwestern CAR, northern Cameroon, eastern Nigeria
- Linguistic classification: Niger–Congo?: Atlantic–Congo; Volta-Congo; Savannas; Mbum–Day
- Subdivisions: Bua; Kim; Mbum; Day

Language codes
- ISO 639-3: –
- Glottolog: mbum1256

The Mbum–Day languages are a subgroup of the old Adamawa languages family (G6, G13, G14, & Day), provisionally now a branch of the Savanna languages. These languages are spoken in southern Chad, northwestern Central African Republic, northern Cameroon, and eastern Nigeria.

== Languages ==
Blench (2006) groups the Mbum (G6), Bua (G13), Kim (G14), and Day languages together within part of a larger Gur–Adamawa language continuum.

- Bua
- Kim
- Mbum
- Day

The Kim, Mbum, and Day are also grouped together in an automated computational analysis (ASJP 4) by Müller et al. (2013)

== See also ==
- List of Proto-Lakka reconstructions (Wiktionary)
- List of Proto-Bua reconstructions (Wiktionary)
- Kim word lists (Wiktionary)
