= Kuo language =

Mbum language

Kuo
- Koh
- Native to: Cameroon, Chad
- Native speakers: 21,000 (2024)
- Language family: Niger–Congo?: Atlantic–Congo; Mbum–Day; Mbum; Central Mbum; Koh–Sakpu; Kuo

Language codes
- ISO 639-3: xuo
- Glottolog: kuoo1238

Kuo (Koh) is an Mbum language of northern Cameroon and southern Chad.

== Distribution ==
Kuo, like Kali, is spoken in scattered areas of the eastern part of Vina department (Mbe and eastern Ngaoundéré communes) and in Mbere department (Meiganga commune) in the Adamawa Region. In the Eastern Region, it is spoken in the northern part of Lom-et-Djerem department (Garoua-Boulaï and Bétaré-Oya communes). It is spoken by 2,975 people.

== Phonology ==
Consonants
		Labial	Alveolar	Palatal	Velar	Labial–velar	Glottal
Nasal		m	n		ŋ		
Plosive	voiceless	p	t		k	k͡p ⟨kp⟩	
Plosive	voiced	b	d	d͡ʒ ⟨z⟩	ɡ ⟨g⟩	ɡ͡b ⟨gb⟩	
Plosive	prenasalized	ᵐb ⟨mb⟩	ⁿd ⟨nd⟩	ⁿd͡ʒ ⟨nz⟩	ᵑɡ ⟨ŋg⟩	ᵑᵐɡ͡b ⟨mgb⟩	
Implosive		ɓ	ɗ				
Fricative	voiceless	f	s				h
Fricative	voiced	v					
Approximant			l	j ⟨y⟩		w	
Flap/tap		ⱱ ⟨vb⟩	ɾ ⟨r⟩				

Vowels
	Front	Back
Close	i	u
Close-mid	e	o
Open-mid	ɛ	ɔ
Open	a	

== Orthography ==
Kuo alphabet
a	b	ɓ	d	ɗ	e	ɛ	f	g	gb	h	i	k	kp	l	m	mb	mgb
n	nd	nz	ŋ	ŋg	o	ɔ	p	r	s	t	u	v	vb	w	y	z	

The tilde (vowel nasalization mark) is written below the vowel letter (a̰, ɛ̰, ḭ, ɔ̰, ṵ). Kuo has 4 tones, written using tone accent (except for mid tone is unwritten): grave (`) for low tone, acute (´) for high tone, and caron (ˇ) for rising tone.
