= Karang language =

Mbum language spoken in Cameroon and Chad

Karang
- Mbum
- Laka
- Native to: Cameroon, Chad
- Native speakers: 17,000 in Cameroon (2007); 1,000 of Karang, Ngumi, Sakpu, and Mbere in Chad (1995)
- Language family: Niger–Congo?: Atlantic–Congo; Mbum–Day; Mbum; Central Mbum; Karang; Karang
- Dialects: Karang; Ngumi

Language codes
- ISO 639-3: kzr
- Glottolog: kara1478
- ELP: Karang

Karang language (also called Mbum East or Lakka) is an Mbum language of Cameroon and Chad.

== Dialects ==
There are 27,000 – 32,000 Karang speakers in Cameroon, including 7,000 speakers of the Sakpu dialect (SIL 1991), and 10,000-15,000 speakers of the Nzakmbay dialect (SIL 1998). Karang is spoken in Touboro and Tcholliré communes in Mayo-Rey department, Northern Region, and also in Chad. It is closely related to Pana.

== Writing system ==
Karang alphabet
Uppercase	A	B	Ɓ	D	Ɗ	E	F	G	GB	H	I	K	KP	L	M	MB	MGB	N	ND	NZ	Ŋ	ŊG	O	Ɔ	P	R	S	T	U	V	VB	W	Y	Ƴ	Z
Lowercase	a	b	ɓ	d	ɗ	e	f	g	gb	h	i	k	kp	l	m	mb	mgb	n	nd	nz	ŋ	ŋg	o	ɔ	p	r	s	t	u	v	vb	w	y	ƴ	z

Nasalisation is indicated with a cedilla : a̧, ȩ, i̧, o̧, ɔ̧, u̧.

The only tone is high, indicated with an acute accent: á, é, í, ó, ɔ́, ú; it can be combined with nasalisation: á̧, ȩ́, í̧, ó̧, ú̧.

Long vowels are indicated with an h.

== See also ==
- List of Proto-Lakka reconstructions (Wiktionary)
