= Peve language =

Afro-Asiatic language of Chad and Cameroon

Pévé
- Lamé
- Zime
- Native to: Chad, Cameroon
- Native speakers: (ca. 35,000 cited 1999–2000)
- Language family: Afro-Asiatic: Chadic; Masa; South; Peve–Kaɗo; Pévé

Language codes
- ISO 639-3: lme
- Glottolog: peve1243

The Pévé language, sometimes referred to as Lamé (the main dialect), is a member of the Masa branch of the Chadic family that is spoken in parts of Cameroon and the Republic of Chad.

== Varieties ==
The term "Zime" is not used in Cameroon, but it is used by ALCAM (2012) to serve as a cover term for the Lame, Peve, and three varieties spoken in Cameroon. There are 5,720 speakers (SIL 2000). Zime is spoken in Cameroon in Bénoué department (Northern Region), along the Chadian border. It is also spoken in Chad. The dialects spoken in Cameroon are:

- Peve, in the north, straddling Bibemi Arrondissement (Bénoué Department) and Rey-Bouba Arrondissement (Mayo-Rey Department)
- Taari, in the central area, in Rey Bouba Arrondissement (Mayo-Rey Department) to the west of Bouba Njida National Park
- Lame, in Rey Bouba Arrondissement, but to the east of Bouba Njida National Park, in the Djibao (Dzipao) area. It is different from Lame of Nigeria.

== Sociolinguistic situation ==
An Ethnologue survey in 1999 identified about 30,000 speakers of Pévé in the Republic of Chad and 6,000 speakers in the North and Far North regions of Cameroon (Ethnologue). Like most speakers of Chadic languages, Pévé speakers tend to be fluent in their language of heritage as well as the vehicular languages of their respective areas. These include the Mundang and Fula languages, both of which are members of the Niger-Congo language family, as well as French, English, and other languages. Unlike many neighboring languages, the number of speakers of Pévé appears to have increased over the past two decades. This is in part due to the Comité pour le Promotion de la Langue et de la Culture Lamé (CPLCL), an organization based in Cameroon and Chad whose goal is to share and preserve cultural customs and traditions, including language use.

The name Lamé is also used for a dialect of the related Ngeté-Herdé language.

== Grammar ==
Like other Chadic languages, Pévé has a rich set of grammatical forms and functions that differ from those of closely related languages, even though the related languages may be spoken just a few kilometers away. For example, Pévé differs from many Chadic languages in having a copula corresponding to ‘to be’. Unlike most languages with an inherent copula, the copula in Pévé can be used in reference to past or future time but not in reference to present time. Another interesting feature of Pévé is the use of pronouns to mark tense, mood, and aspect, along with the grammatical functions of subject and object. These and other unusual form-function relationships make Pévé a likely source for future linguistic studies.

== Phonology ==
=== Consonants ===
Consonants of Pévé
		Labial	Alveolar		Post-alveolar	Velar	Glottal
		Labial	plain	sibilant	Post-alveolar	Velar	Glottal
Nasal		m	n			ŋ	
Plosive	voiceless	p	t	ts	tʃ	k	ʔ
Plosive	voiced	b	d	dz	dʒ	ɡ	
Plosive	implosive	ɓ	ɗ				
Fricative	voiceless	f	ɬ	s			h
Fricative	voiced	v	ɮ	z		ɣ	
Trill			r				
Approximant		w	l		j		

Contrary to previous assertions, Pévé does not "contrast" voiceless and voiced glottal fricatives ([h] vs. [ɦ]). In fact, the "voiced glottal fricative" does not exist (either phonologically or phonemically) in the Pévé language.

=== Vowels ===
Peve has 5 vowels: /i/, /e/, /a/, /o/, /u/, plus their nasalized forms (/ĩ/, /ẽ/, /ã/, /õ/, /ũ/). The vowels /ɪ, ɛ, ɔ, ʊ/ occur as lax variations of their tense counterparts in closed syllables and occasionally in open syllables.

== Publications ==
The grammatical and semantic forms and functions of Pévé, along with many cultural features, are described in detail in A Grammar of Pévé (see below), published in January 2020 by Brill Publishers. The volume, based on data gathered from 2012 to present, is written by Erin Shay, professor of linguistics at the University of Colorado, Boulder, in collaboration with Lazare Wambadang, a native speaker of Pévé, professional educator and president of Comité pour le Promotion de la Langue et de la Culture Lamé.
