= Lamé =

Lamé may refer to:

- Lamé (fabric), a clothing fabric with metallic strands
- Lamé (fencing), a jacket used for detecting hits
- Lamé (crater) on the Moon
- Ngeté-Herdé language, also known as Lamé, spoken in Chad
- Peve language, also known as Lamé after its chief dialect, spoken in Chad and Cameroon
- Lamé, a couple of the Masa languages of West Africa
- Amy Lamé (born 1971), British radio presenter
- Gabriel Lamé (1795–1870), French mathematician
- Mario Lamé, Uruguayan rugby union coach and player

== See also ==
- Lamé curve, geometric figure
- Lamé parameters
- Lame (disambiguation)
- Lame (kitchen tool), occasionally misspelled lamé
