= Lame =

Lame or LAME may refer to:

== Music ==
- Lame (song) by The Beaches (band)
- "Lame" (song) by Unwritten Law
- Lame (album) by Iame
- "Lame", an interlude by Janet Jackson from All for You

== People ==
- Artan Lame, Albanian publicist, historian, and politician
- Garba Lame, Nigerian wrestler
- Ibrahim Lame (born 1953), Nigerian educator and politician
- Ilir Lame, Albanian footballer
- Jennifer Lame (fl. 2007–pres.), American film editor
- Khaby Lame (born 2000), Italian influencer
- Quintín Lame (1880–1967), Colombian rebel
- Lame Kodra, pen name of Sejfulla Malëshova (1900–1971), Albanian politician and writer

== Technology ==
- LAME, audio encoding computer software
- Lame (armor), a single plate of a suit of armour
- Lame (kitchen tool), a blade for scoring bread loaves
- Licensed Aircraft Maintenance Engineer (LAME or L-AME), professional title and qualification

== Other uses ==
- A limp or lameness, a leg impairment (dated, now usually offensive)
  - Lameness (equine) in horses
  - Any physical disability (by extension)
- Lame language, a Nigerian, Bantoid dialect cluster

== See also ==
- Lamé (disambiguation)
- List of people known as the Lame
- Lago delle Lame, a lake in Liguria, Italy
- Lamer, hacker slang term
- Lamestream media
