= Back-released click =

Consonantal sound

ʞ

ʞ̃̊
- IPA number: 291

Encoding
- Entity (decimal): &#670;
- Unicode (hex): U+029E
Image

Velar-released click

ᵏʞ

ᵑ̊ʞ

Uvular-released click

𐞥ʞ

ᶰ̥ʞ

A back-released click, or more precisely a velar-released or uvular-released click, is a click consonant found in paralinguistic use in languages across Africa, such as Wolof. The tongue is in a similar position to other click articulations, such as an alveolar click, and like other clicks, the airstream mechanism is lingual. However, unlike other clicks, the salient sound is produced by releasing the rear (velar or uvular) closure of the tongue rather than the front closure. Consequently, the air that fills the vacuum comes from behind the tongue, from the nasal cavity and the throat. Velar- and uvular-released clicks are always voiceless and typically nasal ([ᵑ̊ʞ] or [ᶰ̥ʞ]), as nasal airflow is required for a reasonably loud production. An advanced or retracted diacritic may be used, ⟨ʞ᫈⟩ or ⟨ʞ᫢⟩, to specify a pre-velar or post-velar/uvular release.

== Production ==
Lionnet describes the clicks as follows:

Like any other click, [ʞ] is produced with an ingressive lingual (velaric) airstream: the oral cavity is closed in two places: at the velum and at the front of the mouth. Air rarefaction in the intra-oral cavity is achieved mostly through tongue body lowering. However, instead of the front closure, the velar closure is released, allowing air to rush into the mouth from the back, either from the nasal cavity or from the post-velar cavity if the velo-pharyngeal port is closed.

Velar clicks are produced with closed lips in those languages known to have them. For this reason, it was at first thought that the front articulation was labial. However, the labial closure does not appear to be distinctive. Although articulatory measurements have not been done, it appears that the two relevant articulations are dorsal and coronal: The rear articulation appears to be at the very front of the velum, near the hard palate: [ʞ᫈] (at least in Wolof and Laal), and the front articulation is dental or alveolar. The lips are closed merely because that is their rest position; opening the lips has no effect on the consonant. That is, the setup of a velar click is very much like one of the coronal clicks, [ǀ, ǂ, ǃ], but with the roles of the two closures of the tongue reversed.

In Mundang and Kanuri, the rear articulation is said to be uvular and back-velar [ʞ᫢] rather than front-velar. Comparisons between the languages have yet to be done.

== Occurrence ==
Paralinguistic velar clicks are attested from a number of languages in west and central Africa, from Senegal in the west to northern Cameroon and southern Chad in the east. The literature reports at least Laal, Mambay, Mundang, and Kanuri in the east, and Wolof and Mauritanian Pulaar in the west.

In Wolof, a back-released velar click is in free variation with a lateral click or an alveolar click. It means 'yes' when used once, and 'I see' or 'I get it' when repeated. It is also used for back-channeling. In Laal as well, it is used for "strong agreement" and back-channeling, and is in free variation with the lateral click. It appears to have the same two functions in the other languages.

== Phonetic symbol ==
In 1921, the International Phonetic Association (IPA) adopted Daniel Jones' symbol ⟨ʞ⟩, a turned lowercase K, for the palatal clicks of Khoekhoe. Jones seems to have first applied the label "velar" in an IPA publication in 1928; presumably he had analyzed these clicks as velar when he chose the symbol. (See Anthropos phonetic alphabet.) At the time, little was known about the articulation of clicks, and different authors used different labels for the same sounds – Doke, for example, analyzed the same clicks as alveolar. The last mention of the "velar" clicks was in the 1949 Principles. It was omitted when the other three click letters were moved into the symbol chart in 1951, and was not mentioned again.

An actual forward-released velar click, analogous to the other articulations of click consonants in the languages of southern Africa, is not possible. A click is articulated with two closures of the tongue or lips. The rear articulation of all clicks is velar or uvular, and the families of dental, alveolar, palatal, and bilabial clicks are defined by the front closure, which is released to cause the influx of air from the front of the mouth that identifies the type of click. A forward closure in the velar region would leave no room for the air pocket that generates that influx of air.

From 2004 to 2015 the unused letter was picked up by the extensions to the IPA to mark a velodorsal articulation in speech pathology. However, velar clicks are possible in the sense that the release sequence of the tongue closures can be reversed: in paralinguistic use in languages such as Wolof, it is the rear (often velar) closure rather than front one that is released to produce the sound, and such clicks have also been called 'velar'. The letter ⟨ʞ⟩ has been used for such sounds in the literature (though not by the IPA itself), and ⟨ʞ⟩ was consequently dropped from the extIPA to avoid confusion with that usage.

== See also ==
- Alveolar click
- Bilabial click
- Dental click
- Lateral click
- Palatal click
- Retroflex click
- Index of phonetics articles
- Click consonant

Place →	Labial					Coronal										Dorsal					Laryngeal			
Manner ↓	Bilabial		Labiodental		Linguolabial		Dental		Alveolar		Postalveolar		Retroflex		(Alveolo-)palatal		Velar		Uvular		Pharyngeal/epiglottal		Glottal	
Nasal	m̥	m	ɱ̊	ɱ		n̼	n̪̊	n̪	n̥	n	n̠̊	n̠	ɳ̊	ɳ	ɲ̊	ɲ	ŋ̊	ŋ	ɴ̥	ɴ				
Plosive	p	b	p̪	b̪	t̼	d̼	t̪	d̪	t	d			ʈ	ɖ	c	ɟ	k	ɡ	q	ɢ	ʡ		ʔ	
Sibilant affricate							t̪s̪	d̪z̪	ts	dz	t̠ʃ	d̠ʒ	tʂ	dʐ	tɕ	dʑ								
Non-sibilant affricate	pɸ	bβ	p̪f	b̪v			t̪θ	d̪ð	tɹ̝̊	dɹ̝	t̠ɹ̠̊˔	d̠ɹ̠˔			cç	ɟʝ	kx	ɡɣ	qχ	ɢʁ	ʡʜ	ʡʢ	ʔh	
Sibilant fricative							s̪	z̪	s	z	ʃ	ʒ	ʂ	ʐ	ɕ	ʑ								
Non-sibilant fricative	ɸ	β	f	v	θ̼	ð̼	θ	ð	θ̠	ð̠	ɹ̠̊˔	ɹ̠˔	ɻ̊˔	ɻ˔	ç	ʝ	x	ɣ	χ	ʁ	ħ	ʕ	h	ɦ
Approximant		β̞		ʋ				ð̞		ɹ		ɹ̠		ɻ		j		ɰ						˷
Tap/flap		ⱱ̟		ⱱ					ɾ̥	ɾ			ɽ̊	ɽ						ɢ̆		ʡ̮		
Trill	ʙ̥	ʙ							r̥	r		r̠	ɽ̊r̥	ɽr					ʀ̥	ʀ	ʜ	ʢ		
Lateral affricate									tɬ	dɮ			tꞎ	d𝼅	c𝼆	ɟʎ̝	k𝼄	ɡʟ̝						
Lateral fricative							ɬ̪		ɬ	ɮ			ꞎ	𝼅	𝼆	ʎ̝	𝼄	ʟ̝						
Lateral approximant								l̪	l̥	l		l̠	ɭ̊	ɭ	ʎ̥	ʎ	ʟ̥	ʟ		ʟ̠				
Lateral tap/flap									ɺ̥	ɺ			𝼈̊	𝼈		ʎ̮		ʟ̆						

		BL	LD	D	A	PA	RF	P	V	U
Implosive	Voiced	ɓ			ɗ		ᶑ	ʄ	ɠ	ʛ
Implosive	Voiceless	ɓ̥			ɗ̥		ᶑ̊	ʄ̊	ɠ̊	ʛ̥
Ejective	Stop	pʼ			tʼ		ʈʼ	cʼ	kʼ	qʼ
Ejective	Affricate		p̪fʼ	t̪θʼ	tsʼ	t̠ʃʼ	tʂʼ	tɕʼ	kxʼ	qχʼ
Ejective	Fricative	ɸʼ	fʼ	θʼ	sʼ	ʃʼ	ʂʼ	ɕʼ	xʼ	χʼ
Ejective	Lateral affricate				tɬʼ			c𝼆ʼ	k𝼄ʼ	q𝼄ʼ
Ejective	Lateral fricative				ɬʼ					
Click (top: velar; bottom: uvular)	Tenuis	kʘ qʘ		kǀ qǀ	kǃ qǃ		k𝼊 q𝼊	kǂ qǂ		
Click (top: velar; bottom: uvular)	Voiced	ɡʘ ɢʘ		ɡǀ ɢǀ	ɡǃ ɢǃ		ɡ𝼊 ɢ𝼊	ɡǂ ɢǂ		
Click (top: velar; bottom: uvular)	Nasal	ŋʘ ɴʘ		ŋǀ ɴǀ	ŋǃ ɴǃ		ŋ𝼊 ɴ𝼊	ŋǂ ɴǂ	ʞ	
Click (top: velar; bottom: uvular)	Tenuis lateral				kǁ qǁ					
Click (top: velar; bottom: uvular)	Voiced lateral				ɡǁ ɢǁ					
Click (top: velar; bottom: uvular)	Nasal lateral				ŋǁ ɴǁ					
