= Bobbodji =

- Coordinates: 6.9833°N 13.0167°E
- Country: Cameroon
- Region: Adamawa
- Department: Vina
- arrondissement: Martap
- Elevation: 1,276 m (4,186 ft)

Population (2005)
  - Total: 269

Bobbodji is a village in the commune of Martap, in the Adamawa Region of Cameroon.

== Population ==
In 1967, Bobbodji contained 223 inhabitants, mainly Kaka people

In the 2005 census, 269 people were counted there.

== Bibliography ==
- Jean Boutrais (ed.), Peuples et cultures de l'Adamaoua (Cameroun) : actes du colloque de Ngaoundéré, du 14 au 16 janvier 1992, ORSTOM, Paris; Ngaoundéré-Anthropos, 1993, 316 p. ISBN 2-7099-1167-1
- Dictionnaire des villages de l'Adamaoua, ONAREST, Yaoundé, October 1974, 133 p.
