= Bakari Bata =

- Coordinates: 6.9333°N 14.6000°E
- Country: Cameroon
- Region: Adamawa
- Department: Vina
- Elevation: 794 m (2,605 ft)

Population (2005)
  - Total: 879

Bakari Bata (also known as Bakiri Bata) is a village in the commune of Belel in the Adamawa Region of Cameroon.

== Population ==
In 1967, the settlement contained 681 inhabitants, mostly Fula people In the 2005 census, 879 people were counted there.

== Infrastructure ==
There is a public school in Bakari Bata.

== Bibliography ==
- Jean Boutrais, 1993, Peuples et cultures de l'Adamaoua (Cameroun) : actes du colloque de Ngaoundéré du 14 au 16 janvier 1992, Paris : Éd. de l'ORSTOM u.a.
- Dictionnaire des villages de l'Adamaoua, ONAREST, Yaoundé, October 1974, 133 p.
