= Mono language (Cameroon) =

Moribund Mbum language in northern Cameroon

Mono
- Native to: Cameroon
- Ethnicity: 500 Dama
- Native speakers: 300 Mono (2001); 50 Dama (2002)
- Language family: Niger–Congo?: Atlantic–Congo; Mbum–Day; Mbum; Northern Mbum; Dama–Galke; Mono

Language codes
- ISO 639-3: Either: mru – Mono dmm – Dama
- Glottolog: mono1269 Mono dama1267 Dama
- ELP: Mono (Cameroon)
- Dama

Mono is a moribund Mbum language spoken by older adults in northern Cameroon.

Dama, a closely related variety that may have been a dialect of Mono, is already extinct. It was located in the arrondissement of Rey Bouba (Mayo-Rey department, North Region).

== Distribution ==
Mono is spoken north of Rey Bouba, around Kongrong, and along the Mayo-Godi River (Rey Bouba commune, Mayo-Rey department, Northern Region).

Spoken by 1,100 speakers, Mono is in decline as speakers are shifting to Fulfulde.
