= Sultanate of Rey Bouba =

African Kingdom in Cameroon (1804–present)

- 1798–1899 (as independent state)
- White standard of Ndjibba

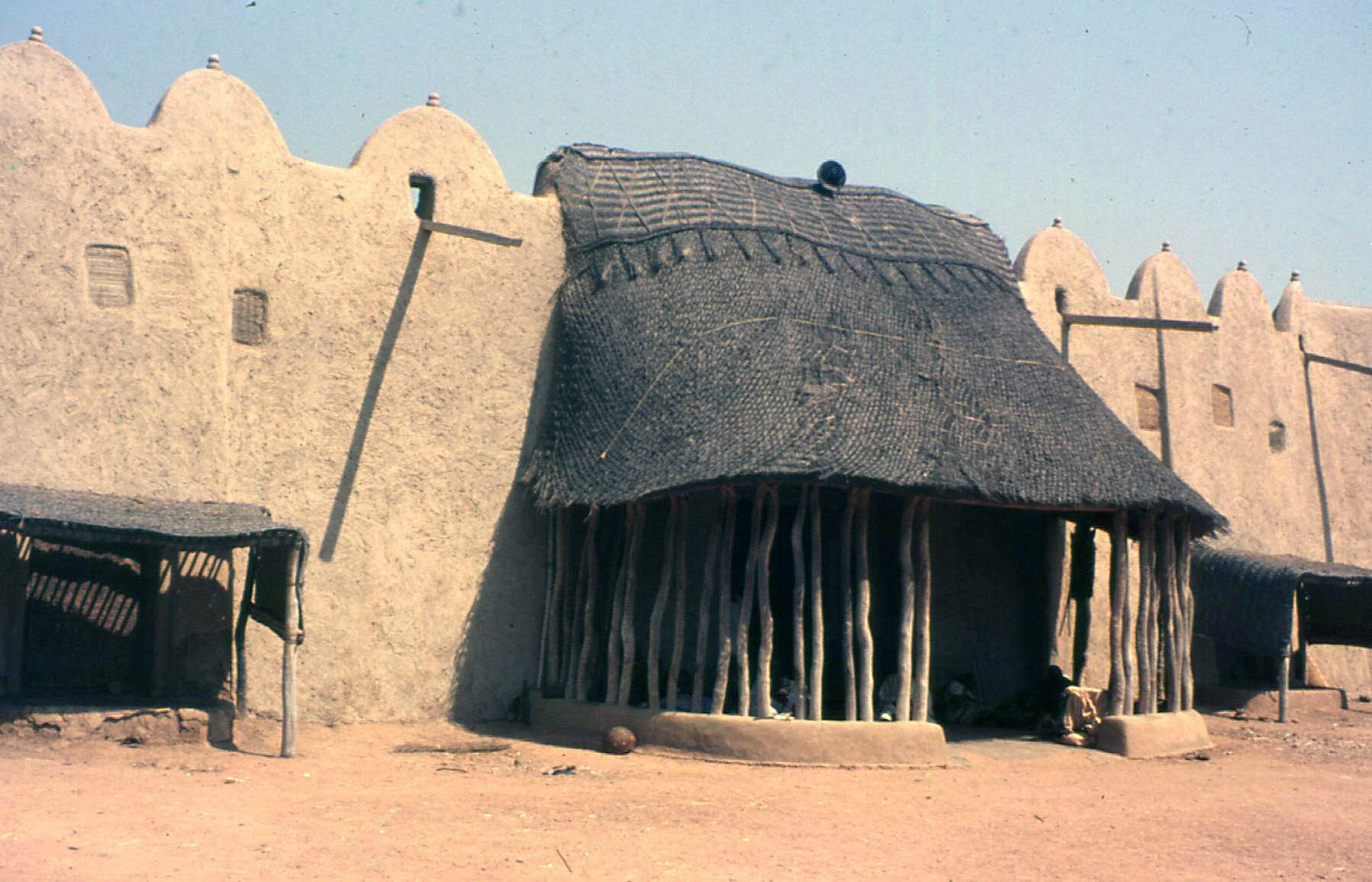
- Entrance to the fortified Palace of Rey Bouba
- Status: Independent vassal kingdom until 1899, now a non-sovereign monarchy within Cameroon
- Capital: Rey Bouba
- Official languages: Fulani
- Ethnic groups: Hausa-Fulani
- Religion: Islam
- Demonym: Boubandjidda
- Lamido
  - 1798–1866: Ndjibba (first)
  - 2006–present: Aboubakary Abdoulaye (current)
- History
  - Established: 1798
  - Receiving a banner from Modibbo Adama: 1806
  - Disestablished: 1899 (as independent state)

Area
  - Total: 36,529 km^{2} (14,104 sq mi)
- Today part of: Cameroon

The Lamidat (Sultanate) of Rey Bouba was a historic African Kingdom situated in modern-day Cameroon, centred on the capital Rey Bouba. It was founded in 1798 and exists to this day as a non-sovereign monarchy within Cameroon. The inhabitants of the sultanate are referred to as Boubandjidda, they are mainly of Fulani origin.

== History ==
=== Independent vassal Kingdom ===
==== Founding and Reign of Bouba Ndjibba ====
Map of the Mayo Rey province in Cameroon which is the Sultanate's boundaries

Yillaga Fulani cattle herders moved into the region of Cameroon and Chad in the late 1700s, displacing the pagan locals (called Kirdi) and adopting Hausa cavalry tactics. The sultanate was founded in 1804, as part of the wider Fulani Jihads, started in Hausaland by Usman dan Fodio. It was a vassal state to the Adamawa Emirate (1809–1903) who in turn swore fealty to the Sokoto Caliphate (1804–1903).

The first sultan (Lamido) was Ndjibba/Jidda (reigned 1798?–1866?) who came from Mali. He became ruler after his father Ardo Yajo seized Rey Bouba. He was under the control of Modibbo Adama who was the Emir of Adamawa and was the Lamido Fombina (Lord of the South), who reigned from 1806 until 1848. Adama ceremonially gifted Ndjibba with a banner, making the state a vassal. Early in Ndjibba's reign he travelled to Yola, he also established the town of Tcholliré. Ndjibba's conquests expanded his kingdom to be larger than modern-day Belgium (30,689sqkm), he attacked the Mbum people and annexed Béré, Mayo Njarendi, Balda and Wouro-Mayo into the kingdom. Ndjibba attempted to break away from the Adamawa by requesting the Sultan of Sokoto recognise his independence, the sultan refused and the Adamawa retook Rey Bouba, causing two wars and sieges of the capital (in 1836 and 1837), however soon after Jidda managed to defeat them and become autonomous, the Lamidat continued to pay tribute to Yola until 1901. Around the year 1860, Njidda's son called Sayhou attempted a coup, which failed, leading to some officials being purged, and him being taken out of the line of succession.

==== Reign of Bouba Jirum ====
Jidda was followed by Bouba Jirum in around 1866, he led the state to power and prosperity, becoming one of the three most strongest states in the Adamawa region. Princes Talla, Goudjal and Mâna (the older brothers of Jirum) conspired against the Sultan but were caught and eliminated. During Jirum's reign the town of Tcholliré was completed, and Nguew and the Baya of Mbéré were attacked. In 1899, Bouba Jirum was assassinated by his sons, he was followed by the short reign of Mal Hamadou, who fled and later died after the German conquest of Rey Bouba in 1899.

=== Autonomy within European colonial empires ===
The Kingdom was annexed into German Kamerun in 1899 (or 1902), during the reign of the tyrant Bouba Gida/Jama'a (1901?–1945) however the Germans allowed Gida to remain as king due to his strict control and ferocity. In 1907, Gida faced the Mahdist uprising of Goni Waday, when a Muslim Jihad was launched against the Germans and their allied states. During WW1, Rey Bouba provided troops and materials for Germany's war effort at the 1st Battle of Garoua, before switching sides in Early 1916 after the German defeat at the 2nd Battle of Garoua. The French, impressed with Gida's help in WW1 kept him as the ruler, making Rey Bouba the only Adamawa sultanate retaining autonomy into the mid-20th Century. Bell stated that Rey Bouba was:

a remarkable relic of the old slave-dealing days...where a white man’s actions are governed by a black man’s wishes

In 1928, the sultanate faced a revolt led by the Laka and Baya peoples, however this was defeated. Shortly after WW2, Austrian explorer Ernst Zwilling visited to find that the Sultan Bouba Amadou (1945–1973?) was still in power, with his medieval-style army, consisting of a Hausa-Fulani style cavalry with mail or quilt armour for the riders and horsemen. White tourists were rarely allowed into the Lamidat, and the ones that were allowed in were escorted by the King's guards, and inhabitants rarely spoke to them. Fred Merfield who visited in the early 20th-Century before Zwilling described the city as 'the Silent City' due to a lack of inhabitants upon his visit.

=== Modern History as part of Cameroon ===
In 1992, the sultan at the time (possibly Moustapha) fired the Belaka of Touboro Aliou Gandei, who ruled over a client chiefdom to Rey Bouba, This action lead to peaceful protests by the inhabitants which were violently repressed by the Lamido's private militia resulting in 2 deaths.

In 2006, the Lamido's palace was added to the UNESCO tentative heritage list for Cameroon, being nominated to become a world heritage site. The current Lamido is Aboubakary Abdoulaye who took the throne in 2006, following the death of his brother Moustapha Abdoulaye. Aboubakary Abdoulaye is now a minister in Cameroon's government. The state still functions as a Medieval absolute monarchy and the Kingdom's rules sometimes override the state laws of Cameroon. Inequality persists and the inhabitants of the state are made to work on the Lamido's fields, they are brought to the fields by dourgourous. They work on these fields before returning to their own fields to tend to (as of 1984).

== Culture and laws ==
According to Bell, singing, shouting, laughing, music, alcohol, costly dress (except for the soldiers) and ornamentation were all banned in the kingdom. The Lamido owned a pet lion, which was led about on a chain by a servant. Zwilling stated that the costume of the country was a short blue tunic, although wealthy men wore a type of garment called a Tobe, a common prestige garment in Cameroon. The first king Ndjibba had a white standard, silver drum, a sacred sword and a royal basket, these items are still used in ceremonies for the Lamido. The Sultan was able to marry up to fifty women and kept many concubines.

During the late Ramadan festival the population of the nation gather around the entrance of the palace and bow to the Sultan who would sit at the entrance under a veranda roof. At the festival four large drums are brought out, these drums are not allowed to touch the floor and are always raised above the ground. The army of Rey Bouba would line up outside the palace for this festival, to pay homage to the king, before enacting a battle reenactment. At the end of the festival the Sultan's wives would give everyone in attendance rice, peanut and honey cakes.

=== Slavery ===
The Adamawa Emirate and the Lamidat of Rey Bouba were prominent in the slave trade, and slavery was a key part in the socio-economic culture of Rey Bouba, with slave raids continuing into the First World War according to colonial administrator and elephant hunter Sir Hesketh 'Karamoja' Bell. During the 19th and early 20th Centuries, Northern Cameroon was the main supplier for slaves to the Sokoto Caliphate which was one of the largest slave states at the time, many of these slaves were captured by Rey Bouba. Slaves in Rey Bouba were used on agricultural plantations (called dumde) as well as domestic slaves. Despite the 1936 abolition of slavery in Cameroon by the French, the practice still continued locally, with the Lamido providing slave soldiers to Colonel Brisset of the French army in 1916. Soldier-slaves were referred to as dogari-en whilst concubines and sex slaves were called Sulaabe. State authorities ignored the slavery in exchange for Rey Bouba's unwavering loyalty.

== Governmental structure ==
The Lamido is the head of the kingdom, he controls religious and governemntal affairs with the help of the Council of dignitaries (Faada), headed by the Wadjiri (equivalent to Prime minister), the council includes ministers for different sectors such as the Bounou (minister of agriculture) and the Sarki Siniki (minister of trade). There are also specific officials such as the Samaki (head of the stables), the Sarki Dogari (head of the King's guards) and the Saarkifaada (head Imam). The kingdom is divided into economic zones each controlled by a Dougaris (tax collector).

== Army ==
=== Cavalry ===
Zwilling described the lancers as wearing red tobes, whilst officers wore blue and red silk tobes. The cavalry and infantry mainly wore iron helmets decorated with plumes of ostrich feathers.

Their horses were canopied with cloth of crude designs and brilliant colours, covering the animals to their ears and reaching down almost to their fetlocks. Some of the riders wore mail, others were swathed in heavy robes, with colourful, plumed headgear, and they all carried spears with blades two feet long

— Ernst Zwilling

The army utilised small Arab-Berber horses, typical of Hausa-Fulani cavalry. Rey Bouba also likely had Shuwa Arab light cavalry as utilised by other neighbouring states. The cavalry use swords, spears and blackpowder muskets.

=== Infantry ===
The infantry consisted of spearmen and archers in blue tunics, kilts and draped leopard skins. Some of the infantry wore fezzes and types of phrygian caps as headgear. Spearmen carried large animal hide shields.

Infantry soldiers were equipped with swords, axes, spears and knobkerries, throwing knives and later guns.

== List of Lamidos ==
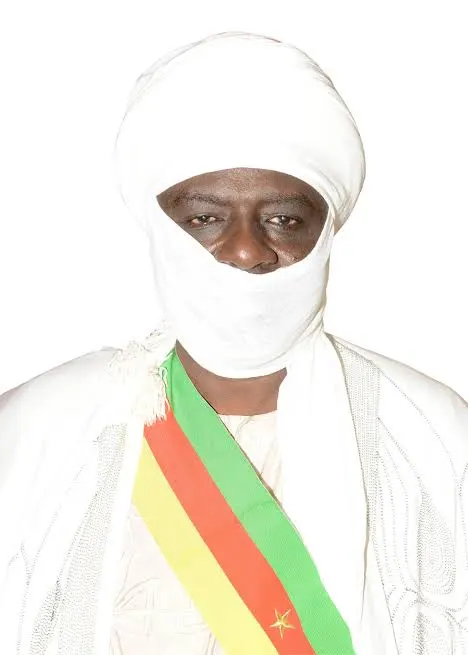
Current Sultan Aboubakary Abdoulaye (2006–present)

=== Regional kings (kings who ruled Rey Bouba before it was a sultanate) ===
- Ardâlé (r. 1500)
- Njobbo Gouré (r. 1629)
- Péto (r. 1629–1667)
- Ardo Djâdjo [possibly Ardo Yajo?] (r. 1667–1694)
- Bouba Mbôndi (r. 1694–1725)
- Bouba Djôda (r. 1725–1798)

=== Independent Lamidos ===
- Ndjibba/Jidda (1798–1866)
- Bouba Jirum (1866–1899)
- Mal Hamadou (1899–1901)

=== Autonomous non-sovereign sultans under colonial rule ===
- Bouba Gida/Jama'a (1901–1945)
- Bouba Amadou (1945–1960)

=== Autonomous non-sovereign sultans under Cameroonian rule ===
- Bouba Amadou [continued] (1960–1973?)
- Moustapha Abdoulaye (1973?–2006)
- Aboubakary Abdoulaye (2006–present)
