= Bayara =

- Coordinates: 6.9667°N 14.4667°E
- Country: Cameroon
- Region: Adamawa
- Department: Vina
- Elevation: 1,148 m (3,766 ft)

Population (2005)
  - Total: 1,479

Bayara is a village in the commune of Belel in the Adamawa Region of Cameroon.

In the 2005 census, there were 1479 people there.

== Bibliography ==
- Jean Boutrais, 1993, Peuples et cultures de l'Adamaoua (Cameroun) : actes du colloque de Ngaoundéré du 14 au 16 janvier 1992, Paris : Éd. de l'ORSTOM u.a.
- Dictionnaire des villages de l'Adamaoua, ONAREST, Yaoundé, October 1974, 133 p.
