= Mundang people =

The Mundang people are an ethnic group in West Africa who live in parts of Cameroon, Chad, and Nigeria. They speak the Mundang language, a subset of Mbum languages.

Historically, the Mundang were an agricultural people; in the beginning of the 20th century they grew and harvested peas, beans, potatoes, nuts and durra. They also branched out into cotton production and raised cattle and goats. They brewed beer as well, from millet. Mundang people in Léré built mud houses with straight roofs and polished interior walls. They also constructed circular corn silos or granaries, accessed through the roof.

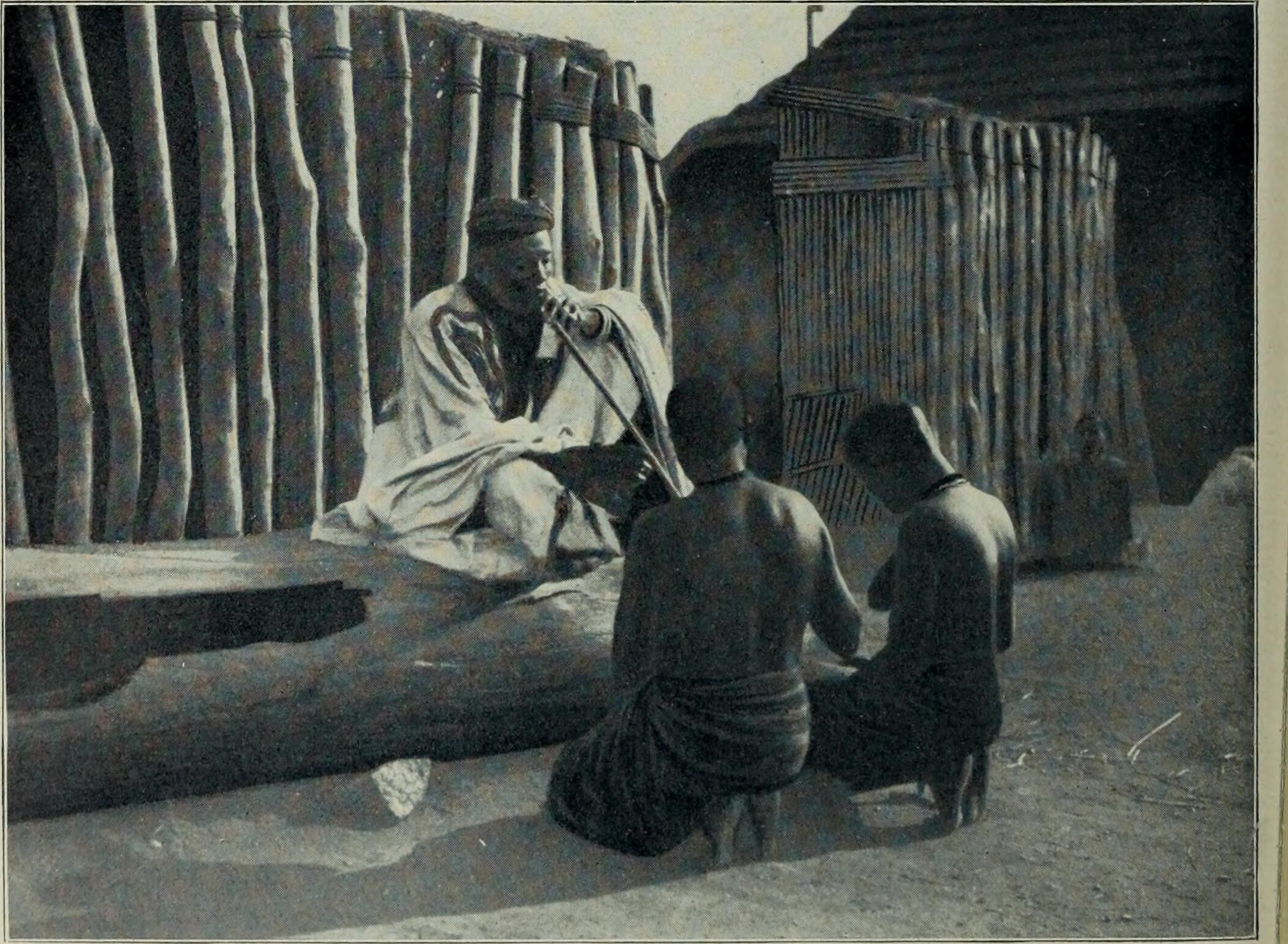
Sultan Lamido Ganthiome and his two wives in Léré, Chad in 1913.

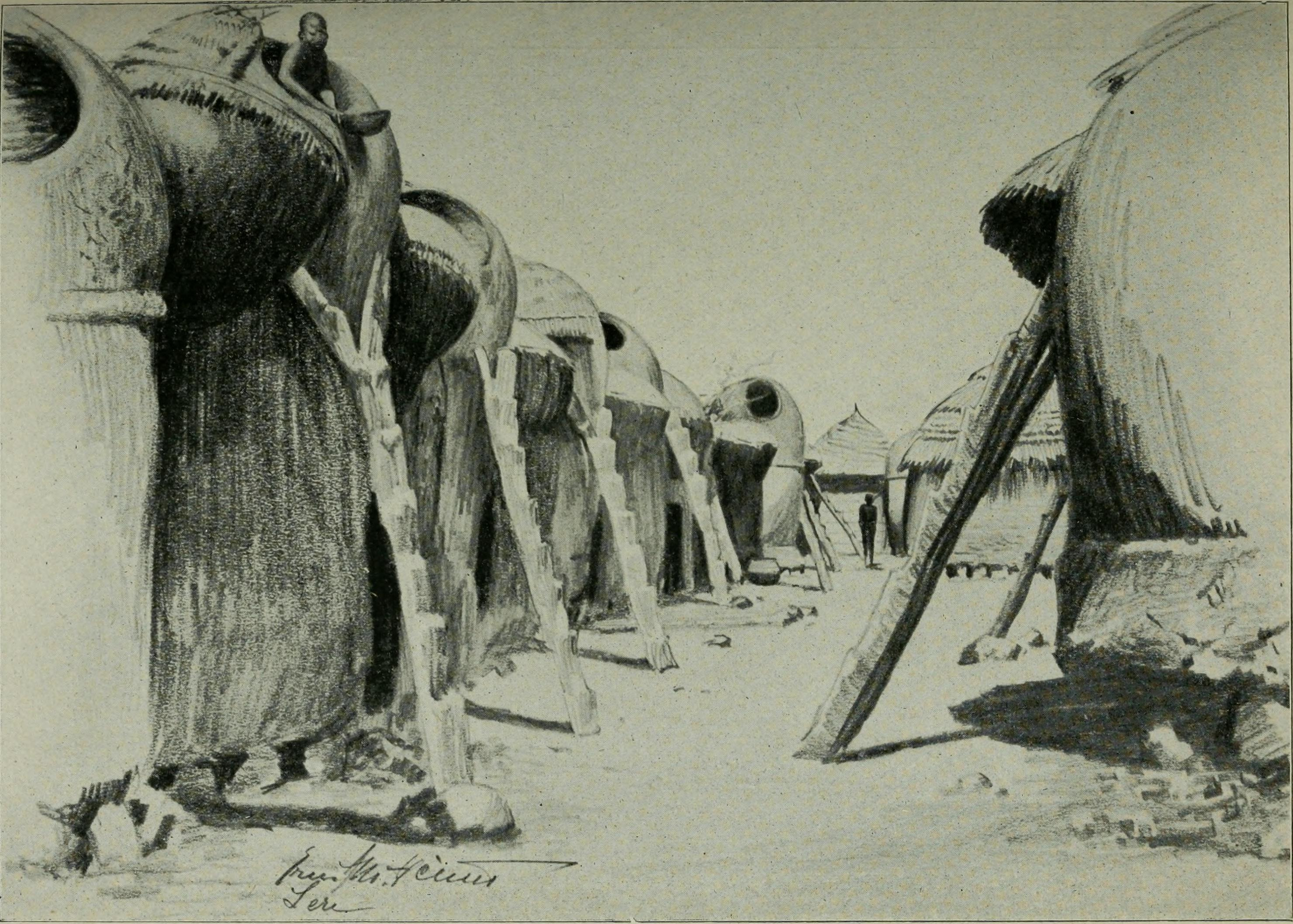
Corn towers of the Sultan Lamido Ganthiome in Léré, Chad.

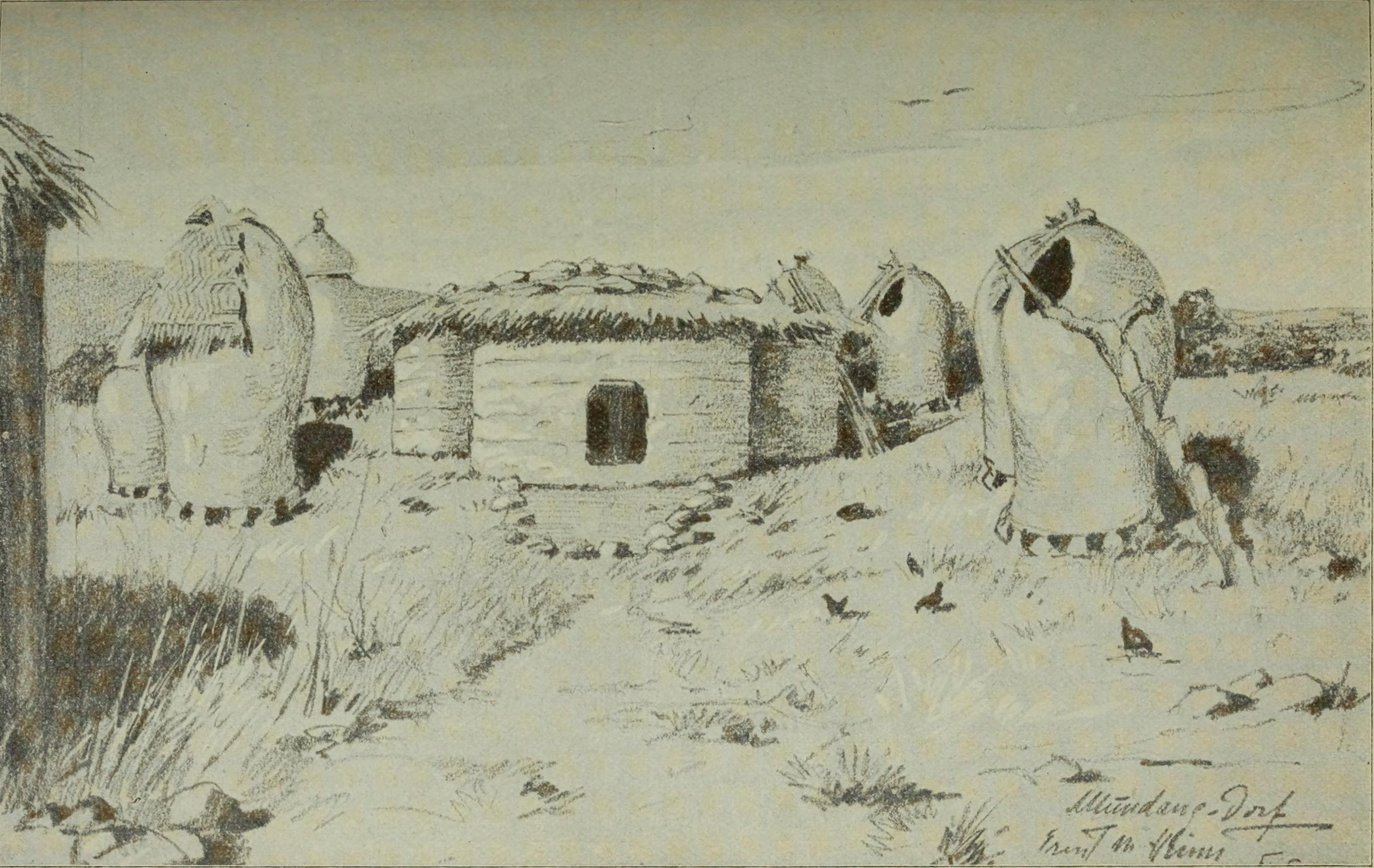
Mundang village of Léré, Chad in about 1913.

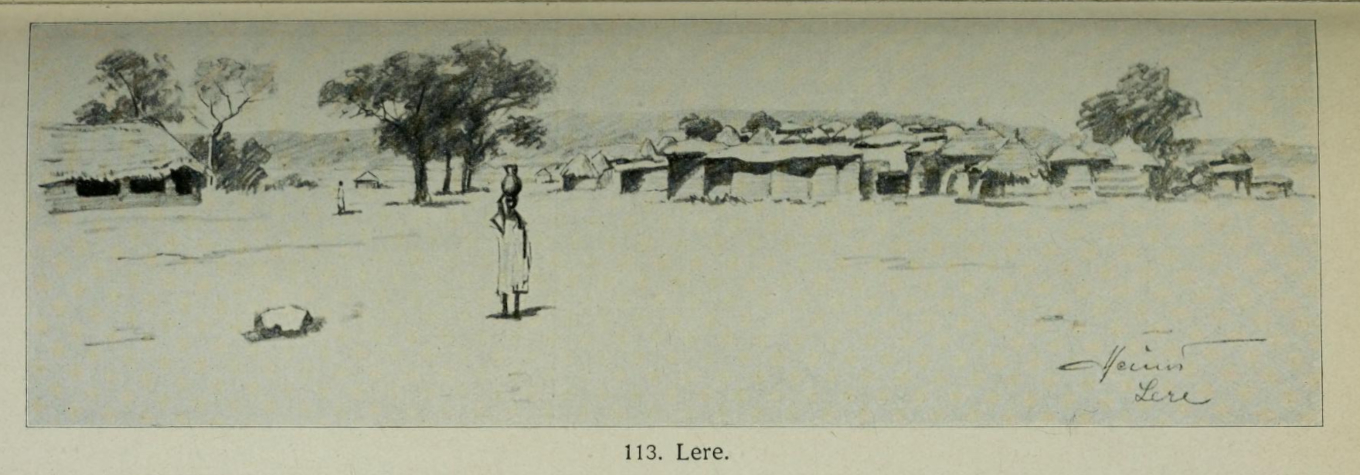
A woman carries water before the village of Léré, Chad. Illustration by Ernst M. Heims.

== Music ==
The Mundang people of Chad use the billim drum, a "double-headed cylindrical drum with laced membranes" to accompany dance rhythmically, alongside an end-blown trumpet and gourd-vessel wrattle. The drum is struck on each side with a hand by the drummer, as the instrument sits on the ground.

Beyond the Mundang's folk music, the communities also have families of musicians called griots by western writers. One of these includes a modern performing act outside of Africa, Sona Jobarteh who acknowledges her Mundang heritage and sees its influence in the bluesy sound of her music.
