= KZR =

KZR or kzr may refer to:

- KZR, the IATA code for Zafer Airport, Altıntaş, Kütahya, Turkey
- kzr, the ISO 639-3 code for Karang language, Cameroon and Chad
