= Kare language (Adamawa) =

Mbum language of the Central African Republic

Kare
- nzáà kã́rĩ́
- Native to: Central African Republic, Cameroon
- Native speakers: (97,000 cited 1996–2000); 62,000 Kare, 35,000 Tale in CAR (1996)
- Language family: Niger–Congo?: Atlantic–Congo; Mbum–Day; Mbum; Central Mbum; Karang; Kare
- Dialects: Kare (Kari, Kali); ? Tale

Language codes
- ISO 639-3: kbn
- Glottolog: kare1338

Kare (Kãrɛ̃, Kareng; autonym nzáà kã́rĩ́, where nzáà = 'mouth') is a southern Mbum language of the Central African Republic, spoken by the Kare people in the mountains of the northeasterly Ouham-Pendé prefecture around Bocaranga. It is spoken by around 97,000 people in the country, and another few thousand speakers in Cameroon. The language's presence on the southeastern edge of the Mbum family is thought to reflect early 19th-century migrations from the Adamawa Plateau, fleeing Fulani raids.

Ethnologue 17 reports that Kare is intelligible with Mbum proper. However, languages more closely related to either are not reported to be intelligible. Ethnologue lists Tale (Tali) as a dialect, but Blench (2004) leaves it unclassified within the Mbum languages. Ethnologue also lists Kali as a synonym; Blench lists a Kali language in a different branch of the Mbum languages.

== Phonology ==
Kare has the following consonantal phonemes:

Consonant phonemes
	Bilabial		Labiodental		Alveolar		Palatal	Velar		Labio- velar		Glottal
Implosive		ɓ				ɗ						
Stop	p	b			t	d		k	ɡ	kp	ɡb	
Prenasalized stop		ᵐb				ⁿd			ᵑg		ᵑɡb	
Fricative			f	v	s	z						h
Prenasalized fricative						ⁿz						
Approximant						l			j		w	
Flap				ⱱ		r						

It has the following vowel phonemes:

	Oral vowels		Nasal vowels	
	Front	Back	Front	Back
Close	i	u	ĩ	ũ
Close-mid	e	o		
Open-mid	ɛ	ɔ	ɛ̃	ɔ̃
Open	a		ã	

There is a phonological contrast between high and low tone (e.g. sá 'say' vs. sà 'laugh'), and a rarer phonetic mid tone whose phonological status is not established. Only monosyllabic words may bear rising or falling tone.

== Grammar ==
The basic word order of Kare is subject–verb–object:

kɛ́ hòrò húrù
3SG eat manioc
'he ate manioc'.

Negation is handled with the sentence-final particle yá 'not'; when negated, the locative copula yè 'be (in a place)' is replaced by tí, and the equative copula ɓá 'be (equivalent to)' by tí ɓá.

Verbal nouns are formed by raising the last syllable's tone and adding a suffix -Cà, where C = l or r after an oral vowel, n after a nasal vowel, and is empty after a consonant: fà 'deny' > fárà 'denial', sɛ̀l 'untie' > sɛ́là 'untying'.

=== Pronouns ===
Kare has no grammatical gender. Its personal pronouns are as follows:

	Free	Subject	Object
I	mìí	mì	mí
you sg.	mɔ̀ɔ́	mɔ̀	mɔ́
he/she/it	mɛ̀ɛ́/kɛ́	kɛ́	rɛ́/nɛ́
we	màá	ná	ná
you pl.	yìɓàí	yì	ɓàí
they	kìí	kì	kìí

To these may be added hánà 'each other, other'.

=== Noun phrases ===
There is a closed class of morphologically invariant adjectives (e.g. fé 'new', sɛ́ŋɛ́ 'red'), which typically precede the noun but may also follow it to indicate a permanent quality, or may be used as nouns in their own right. Determiners (hánà 'other', kɛ́ 'the', yɛ̀í 'this', yɔ̀ɔ́ 'that', nɛ̄ 'that yonder') follow the noun, and are followed by the plural marker rì:

nzù kɛ́ rí pí
person DEF PL also
'the people too'

Numerals and quantifiers come at the end, following the (optional) plural marker:

nzù ndíɓí
person five
'five people'

nzù rì sérè
person PL two
'two people'

Direct genitives are formed by juxtaposition

sã̀ũ̀ lìà
root story
'the story's basis'

analytic genitives use the particle ʔà

vùn ʔà bá
house GEN father
'the father's house'

Relative clauses are formed with a demonstrative followed (not always immediately) by the relative marker ɗá

nzù yɛ̀í ɗá rí mí léóɗáà
person this REL rob me yesterday
'the person who robbed me yesterday'

=== Prepositions ===
All adpositions in Kare precede their complement. There are four primary (pure) prepositions: kà 'with (instrumental)', té 'with (comitative)', ʔá 'in', báŋ 'like',

kɛ́ ɡí té bá nɛ̄
3SG come with father 3SG.POSS
'he came with his father'

Alongside these there are a number of secondary postpositions transparently derived from nouns (often body parts), e.g. tûl 'head' > túl 'on top of'.
