= GKE =

GKE may refer to:

- Google Kubernetes Engine, part of Google Cloud Platform
- NATO Air Base Geilenkirchen, in Germany
- Ndai language, native to Cameroon
