= Idool, Cameroon =

Idool
- Coordinates: 7°10′N 14°07′E
- Country: Cameroon
- Region: Adamawa
- Department: Vina
- Elevation: 1,350 m (4,430 ft)

Population (2005)
  - Total: 1,952

Idool (also Idol) is a village in the commune of Belel in the Adamawa Region of Cameroon, on the road from Ngaoundéré to Bebel and Mbang.

== Population ==
In 1967, Idool contains 272 inhabitants, mainly Fula people

At the time of the 2005 census, there were 1952 people in the village.

== Economy ==
The economy of Idool is based primarily on agriculture and raising livestock, with some tourism as a result of its cool climate. However, the insecurity of the region has led a number of the inhabitants to move away to Ngaoundéré, a settlement 70 kilometres (43 mi) away.

== Infrastructure ==
Idool is famous for its urban planning and architecture in addition to the eucalyptus trees planted throughout the village. Great care is taken in maintenance of roads, cleanliness and organization. Only the width of the road and tree spacing was directed by the administration, with all other planning undertaken by the residents under the guidance, "of their customary chief and spiritual guide Oumara Yaya."

Idool possesses a mosque, a health centre built in 2003, a lycée which has been operating since 2007/2008, and a high school.

== History ==
According to Muslim Fulani traditions, a village chief called Yaya Oumarou impressed a French administrator, who suggested he move his community to the edge of the highway in order to allow easier communication and administration. In this manner, Idool was established in 1958.

== See also ==
- Communes of Cameroon

== Bibliography ==
- Jean Boulet, Idool : étude d'un village pilote de l'Adamaoua, ORSTOM, Yaoundé, 1967, 26 p.
- Jean Boutrais, 1993, Peuples et cultures de l'Adamaoua (Cameroun) : actes du colloque de Ngaoundéré du 14 au 16 janvier 1992, Paris : Éd. de l'ORSTOM u.a.
- Dictionnaire des villages de l'Adamaoua, ONAREST, Yaoundé, October 1974, 133 p.
