= Kali language =

Moribund Mbum language of Cameroon

Kali
- Native to: uncertain: Central African Republic or Cameroon
- Language family: Niger–Congo?: Atlantic–Congo; Mbum–Day; Mbum; Northern Mbum; Dama–Galke; Kali

Language codes
- ISO 639-3: None (mis)
- Glottolog: None

Kali is a presumably moribund Mbum language of northern Cameroon or the Central African Republic.

== Distribution ==
Kali, or Kali-Dek, is found in scattered areas throughout the eastern part of Vina department (Belel commune), in the eastern part of the communes of Ngaoundéré (Vina department, Adamawa Region) and Meiganga (Mbere department, Adamawa Region), and the northern part of Lom-et-Djerem department (Garoua-Boulaï and Bétaré-Oya communes, Eastern Region). It is spoken by 7,438 speakers.
