= Idool =

Idool may refer to:

- Idool, Cameroon
- Idool (TV series)
