= Ndai language =

Mbum language of northern Cameroon

Ndai
- Native to: Cameroon
- Native speakers: 5 (2002)
- Language family: Niger–Congo?: Atlantic–Congo; Mbum–Day; Mbum; Northern Mbum; Dama–Galke; Ndai

Language codes
- ISO 639-3: gke
- Glottolog: ndai1238
- ELP: Ndai

Ndai, also known as Galke or Pormi, is a nearly extinct Mbum language of northern Cameroon. There are only about a few speakers remaining in the vicinity of Tcholliré (Tcholliré commune, Mayo-Rey department, Northern Region). The name of the language supposedly comes from the language's word for 'cow'. The language is spoken to a degree of fluency by five speakers, all over the age of 50, and two others are alleged to hold a conversational-level knowledge of the language.
