= PNZ =

PNZ, or pnz, may refer to

- Paralympics New Zealand, a sporting body in New Zealand
- PNZ, the IATA code for Petrolina Airport, Pernanmbuco, Brazil
- pnz, the ISO 639-3 code for the Pana language of the Central African Republic
- PNZ, the National Rail code for Penzance railway station, Cornwall, UK
