= Pana language =

Mbum language of the Central African Republic

Pana
- Native to: Central African Republic, Chad, Cameroon
- Native speakers: (86,000 cited 1996–2000)
- Language family: Niger–Congo?: Atlantic–Congo; Mbum–Day; Mbum; Central Mbum; Karang; Pana
- Dialects: Pana; ? Pondo; ? Gonge

Language codes
- ISO 639-3: pnz
- Glottolog: pana1293
- ELP: Pana (Central African Republic)

Pana is an Mbum language of the Central African Republic. A few thousand speak it in southern Chad and northern Cameroon. A dialect in Cameroon, Man, may be a separate language. Blench (2004) leaves Pondo and Gonge in CAR unclassified within the Mbum languages.

== Distribution ==
Pana is spoken around Belel (Belel commune, Vina department, Adamawa Region), and in Mayo-Rey department, Northern Region. It is also found in CAR and Chad.
