= Marba language =

Afro-Asiatic language spoken in Chad

Marba
- Azumeina
- Native to: Chad
- Native speakers: 270,000 (2019)
- Language family: Afro-Asiatic: Chadic; Masa; North; Musey–Marba; Marba
- Dialects: Léo; Marba/Kolon
- Writing system: Latin

Language codes
- ISO 639-3: mpg
- Glottolog: marb1239

Marba is an Afro-Asiatic language spoken by the Azumeina peoples of Chad as their first language. It is also the name of one of the Azumeina peoples.

== Description ==
The Marba language is indigenous primarily to:

- Tandjilé Ouest (fr), one of three departments in the Tandjilé Region (fr) of south-western Chad (the others are Tandjilé Centre and Tandjilé Est)
- Leou-Mbassa sous-préfecture in the department of Kabbia (fr) in the Mayo-Kebbi Est (fr) region.

Historically the language has sometimes been called Azumeina. The peoples who speak Marba as their traditional first language are still known collectively as Azumeina. These are the Marba, Kolon, Gogo, Léo and Dargaye clans. Some people identify the Léo as ethnically Musey, even though they speak Marba as their first language.

The Azumeina are among the peoples known collectively as Banana; the others are the Massa, who speak Masa, and the Musey. The Banana peoples correlate with the Masa North languages.

Marbana means "Marba people" and Masana similarly means "Massa people". Alternate non-preferred spellings of Marba include Maraba. The name "Marba Ho Ho" was sometimes used historically but has fallen into disuse.

The Marba of this article is a different topic from Marfa [mvu] and Maba [mde] which are Nilo-Saharan languages spoken in the Ouaddaï and Wadi Fira regions of Chad.

== Classification ==
Marba [mpg] is classified in the Masa languages (fr) subgroup of the Chadic languages (fr) branch of the Afro-Asiatic language (fr) family.

== Geographic distribution and variations ==
The following people groups speak Marba and are therefore called Azumeina:

- Marba
- Kolon (sometimes incorrectly spelled Koloŋ, Kolong or Kulung)
- Gogo
- Léo (also spelled Léou).

Each of these people groups comprises several clans. The name of a clan is often the same as the name of the clan's home village or township as noted in the following tables.

Many Azumeina now live outside their traditional area. For example, there is a significant community of Marba-speaking people in N'Djaména and around Kouroup north of Koyom in the Mayo Boneye (fr) department of Mayo-Kebbi Est (fr).

The Marba clans

Name of clan	Location (sous-préfecture)
Bagaye	Bagaye
Dyh (Dih, Dí)	Baktchoro
Gogor ( comprising the Damndou, Ganduru (Mballa) and the Kakraou sub-clans )	Baktchoro
Kandja	Baktchoro
Kolbeye (Kolobeye)	Baktchoro
Kourey (Kourey)	Baktchoro
Méguené (Méguiné)	Bagaye and Mésmé
Tchiré ( including the Tchiré Orgui and the Tchiré Magoumei )	Baktchoro

The Kolon clans

Name of clan	Location (sous-préfecture)
All the clans below	The sous-préfecture of Kolon: west of Dadji and Massang and north of the Kelo-Béré road
Bangado	as above
Dadji (multiple sub-clans)	as above
Diya	as above
Guebé	as above
Guengué	as above
Kolon-Bagaye	as above
Kolon-Kasudu	as above
Kongo	as above
Lobo	as above
Manga	as above
Miré	as above
Moley	as above
Moro	as above
Tchagra	as above

The Gogo clans

Name of clan	Location (sous-préfecture)
Bodozi	tba
Bungor	tba
Einga	tba
Monogoye	Mésmé

The Léo and Dargaye clans

Name of clan	Location (sous-préfecture)
All the clans below	The region of Mayo-Kebbi Est: The department of Kabbia (in the Léou-Mbassa sous-préfecture); The south west part of the department of Mont D'Illi
Baktana	as above
Dalweye	as above
Djargaye 1	as above
Djargaye 2	as above
Gono	as above
Mbassa	as above
Mbaya	as above
Moro	as above
Villi	as above

Some Musey clans use Marba

The following Musey (also spelt Moussey) clans speak Marba but often as a subsequent language:

Name of clan	Location (sous-préfecture)
Domo	The sous-préfecture of Léou-Mbassa in the région of Mayo-Kebbi Est
Djarau	
Gamé	

Geographical variations

Spoken Marba is often mixed with some Hausa, Sara and Chadian Arabic words. However, geographical variations of Marba itself are barely significant enough to be called dialects if a dialect is defined as distinguished by its vocabulary, grammar and pronunciation. Where a distinction can be made only in terms of pronunciation, the term accent may be preferred over dialect. There is little difference in the Marba spoken by the Marba and Kolon peoples. The differences in speech between the Marba and Kolon people on the one hand and the Léo people on the other hand are more related to pronunciation than to grammar or vocabulary. This difference affects mainly some vowels.

People who live at the periphery of the Marba-speaking area mix Marba words with words from neighbouring languages. This occurs for example in the Musey area increasingly as one travels from Léo towards Pala, Gounou Gaya and Fianga.

== The various names of the language ==
=== Azumeina versus Marba ===
The Azumeina peoples now prefer to call their language Marba.

However, when their language began to be written down in the 1960s, the language began to be sometimes called Azumeina. This approach had the advantage of avoiding ambiguity between the Marba people group and the wider group of speakers of the common language. The Leou clans do not see themselves as ethnically Marba i.e. they are not part of the Marba people group even though they share a common language.

Marba is now generally accepted by the Azumeina peoples as the name of their common language. This approach simplifies discussion about language variations in border regions because differences can be explained more easily in terms of mixing of languages. A disadvantage of this approach is the potential ambiguity of the term Marba between the Marba people group and the wider group of Marba-speaking Azumeina peoples.

The transition to the new approach is illustrated in the following timeline:

- A lexicon published by Colin Price in 1968 was titled Azumeina—English Dictionary
- The Holy Bible published by the Alliance Biblique du Tchad (Chadian Bible Society (UBS)) in 1999 carried the French subtitle La Sainte Bible en langue Azumeina (The Holy Bible in the Azumeina language)
- The sixth edition of the Azumeina hymn book published in December 2014 by the Marba-language translation committee carried the French subtitle Cantiques en langue Marba (Songs in the Marba language).

=== Origin of the Marba ===
The origin of Marba is historically unknown: no ancient document explains its origin. However Christian Seignobos recorded that the Marba migrated across the Logone River at the beginning of the 20th century:

Les migrations gumay ont été, en revanche, quelque peu bousculées par le passage du Logone, au Sud, de colonies marba et musey, toujours plus nombreuses. Au début de la période coloniale, les Marba Gogor, aprés leurs démêlés avec le chef Azina Kolon, ont en effet traversé le Logone et les Musey les ont suivis. Faisant irruption dans le no man's land dégagé par les Kwang, alors en repli devant les Masa à Vabolo et Kunsul, Marba et Musey ont agrandi le passage entre Kwang et Masa, allant jusqu'à coloniser les abords de la piste Bongor-Gelendeng. Les fronts pionniers masa avancent moins vite que les colonies marba-musey, disposant du poney. De tradition guerrière, Marba et Musey suscitent encore la crainte. Aussi les Kwang lâchent-ils pied devant eux et gagnent de leur côté le Chari, alors que les Masa ne progressent plus dans cette région. L'interférence marba-musey avec la remontée masa a fait s'infléchir le couloir de migration de ces derniers en direction des Munjuk, au Nord, ce qui complique encore une carte ethnique déjà passablement bigarrée dans cette région de l'interfluve Chari-Logone.

An English translation is as follows:

The Gumay migrations were, however, somewhat diverted by the passage of Logone, in the South, of Marba and Musey colonies, ever more numerous. At the beginning of the colonial period, the Marba Gogor, after their separation from the chief Azina Kolon, crossed the Logone and the Musey followed them. Bursting into the no man's land cleared by the Kwang, then retreating before the Masa to Vabolo and Kunsul, the Marba and Musey expanded the gap between the Kwang and the Masa, colonising as far as the area around the Bongor-Gelendeng track. The pioneer Masa fronts advanced more slowly than Marba-Musey colonies, with the pony. Of a warrior heritage, the Marba and Musey are still feared. Also the Kwang let them walk in front of them and gained their side of the Chari, while the Masa no longer advanced in this region. The Marba-Musey interference of the rise of the Masa curbed the migration corridor of the latter in the direction of the Munjuk, to the North, further complicating an already quite patchy ethnic map in this region between the Logone and Chari rivers.

Dr John Olley wrote in a letter dated 1950, "At Kolong [sic] we met Assina [sic], the Chief of the Banana-Marba. He is a wealthy Chief and has about 30 wives. He is kindly and generous toward us and gave me four goats for meat for my men. He keeps a large lion in a barred den."

Current legends explain the etymology of Marba in various ways as follows:

- A man went out hunting and caught some game. He shared the meat with his brothers but not his father. The father complained that he had been left out i.e. "Mar-ba" where mar means forget and ba means father
- Marba was the ancestor of the Marba people group. The names of the Marba clans come from the names of his sons.

Given the practice of naming people after events, these two legends are not necessarily mutually exclusive. On the other hand, they may be more myth than legend.

=== Origin of the name Azumeina ===
Some people believe that the name Azumeina was used for the first time by the Azumeina themselves and that this name emerged in the mid 1960's as a more inclusive term to include people from the locality who spoke Marba but did not identify as Marba ethically or politically. In this view, the name Azumeina is derived from words meaining "people of the region".

In 1969, Robert Price wrote, "The French know this tribe as the Bananas or the Banana Marba, but the people call themselves the Azumeina. In Azumeina, Banana means 'my male friend', and Marba is a clan of the Azumeina!"

=== Origin of colloquial names Banana and Ho Ho ===
Banana

The name Banana may be derived from the Marba phrase 'my male friend'.

Legend has it that a French official asked someone what language his friend spoke. The reply, "My friend is Marba" (Banana Marba) was misunderstood to be the name of the people group.

Ho Ho

'Ho Ho' refers to the traditional practice of communicating over distances by shouting the sound 'ho' in the tone of the relevant words. The Marba language has three tones.

== Linguistics ==
=== Historical survey of linguistic work ===
Marba was put into writing during the 20th century by representatives of the Azumeina peoples with the support of the Assemblées Chrétiennes au Tchad, the Roman Catholic Church, the United Bible Societies, SIL and other organisations. This was seen as a means to improve life, preserve Azumeina culture and facilitate education and prosperity.

Between 1920 and 1950, several individuals had compiled word lists. For example, Johannes Lukas published information about Marba in 1937 including a list of words.

In 1959, representatives of the Assemblées Chrétiennes au Tchad published and printed the first book in the Marba language. This contained 25 hymns and some passages from the Holy Bible, namely the Lord's Prayer, the Ten Commandments, John 3:16 and Romans 3:23. The hymn book was expanded over time with several reprints.

In the mid-1960s the team for promotion and translation of the Marba language finalised an orthography based on a questionnaire that was sent to nearly 500 Marba readers. This orthography was used for the first complete books of the Holy Bible, namely Mark and Ephesians. These were published by the American Bible Society in 1967.

Colin Price captured his learning in his 500-page "Azumeina-English" lexicon published in 1968. Working separately, Franco Nicola published a lexicon in 1970.

The first edition of the complete New Testament was published in England by the Bible Society (UBS) in 1978, with the support of the Assemblées Chrétiennes au Tchad and the Roman Catholic Church. The Holy Bible, both Old and New Testaments, was initially prepared by the UBS Bible Society in Cameroon (Alliance Biblique du Cameroun) in 1994, but was published by the UBS Bible Society in Chad (Alliance Biblique du Tchad) in 1999.

=== Orthography and phonetics ===
==== AD 1960 – 2000 ====
Orthographic principles

The orthographic principles finalised in the 1960s remained generally the same up to AD 2000. They were as follows:

- Must be able to be typed on a French typewriter
- Letters (graphemes) should be written in a similar manner to French to minimise additional learning with the exception that 'ou' was written 'u' in Marba to simplify vowel clusters. This was because French is one of the two official national languages of Chad and was the written language of the milieu.
- Tones should be indicated only to avoid ambiguity with another word because first-language speakers know the tones.

This orthography may be seen online.

Vowel phonemes and tones

Marba has three tones. Subject to the orthographic principles above, vowels a, e, i, o and u were annotated as follows in order of precedence: dieresis ̈ for long vowels, circumflex ̂ for nasal vowels, acute ́ for high tones, grave ̀ for low tones, mid tones unmarked.

The apostrophe ' indicated:

- Two adjacent vowels pronounced as separate phonemes (i.e. not diphthongs)
- Implosive consonants, as explained below.

Consonant phonemes

Consonants were written as noted in Table 1.

Punctuation

Quotation marks were not used. Speech was reported; direct speech was not used. For example, He said, "I ate the rice." was written He said that he ate the rice.

Full stops, question marks, colons and semi colons were used in a similar manner to French (and English).

Stress, rhythm and intonation

To be completed

==== Current developments in orthography ====
Implementation of Unicode in a wider range of computer software in the early 2000s facilitated use of a wider range of letters (graphemes).

In 2009 the government of Chad specified the character set for use for Chadian languages (fr).

In addition to the letters previously used, the sixth edition of the Marba hymn book published in 2014:

- Simplified the orthography of some consonant phonemes by adding new letters (refer Table 2)
- Included additional vowel letters Ə ə (U+018A, 0259) and Ɨ ɨ (U+0197, 0268)
- Used the tilde to indicate nasal vowels instead of the circumflex, which is the preferred linguistic notation for nasalisation.

Table 1 Orthography of consonants used prior to AD 2000 compared with the 2014 edition of the Marba song book.

Category	Type	Voiceless	Voiced	Implosive
Stops	Bilabial	p	b	b'→Ɓ ɓ (U+0181, U+0253)
	Dental	t	d	d'→Ɗ ɗ (U+018A, U+0257)
	Velar	k	g	'V→Ɦ, ɦ (U+A7AA, U+0266) (tbc)
Fricatives	Labio-dental	f	v	–
	Tongue blade on alveoli (i.e. laminar)	s	z	–
	Spread alveolar-dental	tch→c	dj	–
	Spread dental	hl (ɬ)	zl (ɮ)	–
	Lateral aspirate	h	–	–
Liquids	Alveolar lateral	–	l	–
	Alveolar flapped vibrant	r	r	–
Semi-vowels		w	y	–
Nasals	Bilabial	m	mb	–
	Alveolar/dental	n	nb	–
	Velar (before AD 2000)	– ngV ng (n)	ndj (ⁿd͡ʒ) ngV (ng) –	
	Velar (current)	ng→Ŋ ŋ or ŋg (U+014A, U+014B) pronounced variously ŋ or ^{ŋ}g		–

The following tables indicate the characters known to be in use:

- Table 2 Consonant letters
- Table 3 Vowel letters
- Table 4 Vowel tonal and pronunciation marks
- Table 5 Punctuation marks.

Table 2 Consonant characters in use, with their Unicode numbers (U+0000)

B	Ɓ	C	D	Ɗ	F	G	H	*	J	K
	181			18A				A7AA		
b	ɓ	c	d	ɗ	f	g	h	ɦ	j	k
	253			257				266		

L	M	N	*	P	R	S	T	V	W	Y	Z
			14A								
l	m	n	ŋ	p	r	s	t	v	w	y	z
			14B								

Table 3 Vowel characters is use, with their Unicode numbers (U+0000)

A	Ã	*	E	*	*	I	*	Ï	Ɨ	O	*	U	*
	C3	C4		1EBC	18F		128	CF	197		D5		168
a	ã	ä	e	ẽ	ə	i	ĩ	ï	ɨ	o	õ	u	ũ
	E3	E4		1EBD	259		129	EF	268		F5		169

Table 4 Vowel tonal and pronunciation marks in use, with their Unicode numbers U+0000

Á	*	*	*	
C1	C0	CC	DA	
á	à	ì	ú	ʼ
E1	E0	EC	FA	2BC

Notes:

- ʼ (U+02BC) indicates that the two adjacent vowels are pronounced as separate sounds with a slight pause between them.
- Although not found in the texts surveyed, capitals marked * would be used for writing in all-caps, for example in document headings.

Table 5 Punctuation marks in use, with their Unicode numbers U+0000

!	,	.	…	?
21	2C	2E	3A	3F

=== Vocabulary ===
In the introduction to his lexicon, Colin Price stated that it has 3,405 entries.

== See also ==
Masa languages

Masa (Ethnologue)

Musey language

Musey (Ethnologue)

Ajello, Roberto, M. Karyo, Antonio Melis et O. Dobio. 2001. Lexique comparatif de six langues du Tchadique central. 73. Pisa : Ed. Plus, Università di Pisa.
