= Nzakambay language =

Mbum language spoken in Chad and Cameroon

Nzakambay
- Mbum
- Native to: Chad, Cameroon
- Native speakers: (32,000 cited 2000)
- Language family: Niger–Congo?: Atlantic–Congo; Mbum–Day; Mbum; Central Mbum; Karang; Nzakambay

Language codes
- ISO 639-3: nzy
- Glottolog: nzak1246

Nzakambay (Njak Mbai), or Nzakambay Mbum, is an Mbum language of southern Chad and northern Cameroon.
