= Sakpu language =

Mbum language of southern Chad

Sakpu
- Native to: Chad
- Native speakers: (1,000 speakers of Sakpu, Karang, Ngomi, and Mbere together cited 1995)
- Language family: Niger–Congo?: Atlantic–Congo; Mbum–Day; Mbum; Central Mbum; Koh–Sakpu; Sakpu

Language codes
- ISO 639-3: None (mis)

Sakpu is an Mbum language of southern Chad.

== Sources ==
- Roger Blench, 2004. List of Adamawa languages (ms)
