= Palace of Rey Bouba =

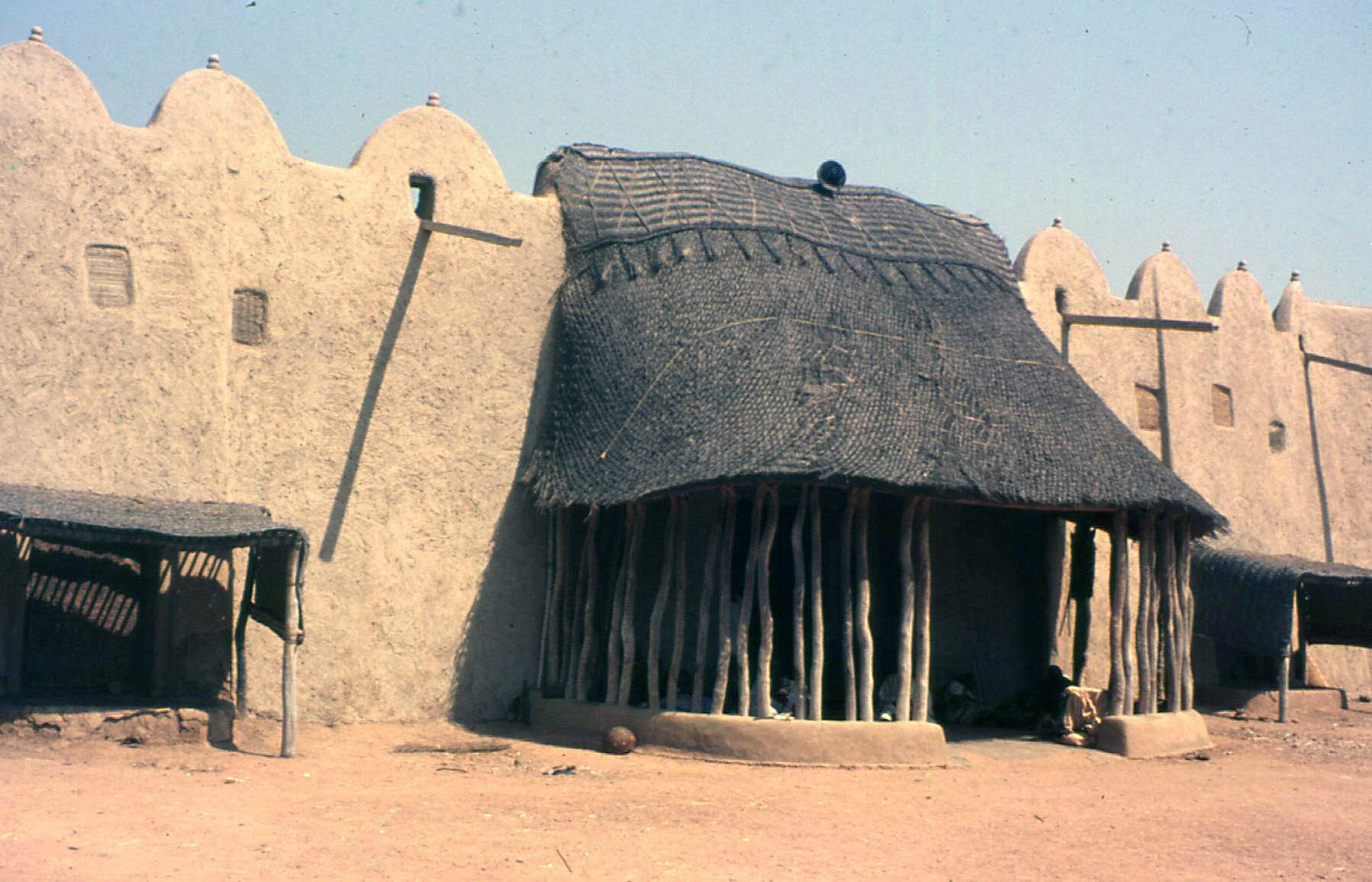
Lamidat Palace

The Palace of Rey Bouba is the seat of power for the Lamidat (sultanate) of the Rey Bouba. It is located within the city of Rey Bouba in the North Province of Cameroon.

== Site description ==
The palace itself covers approximately five hectares. It is surrounded by a high enclosing wall of approximately seven metres, with a central entry in the southern frontage. The interior of the palace comprises courses, vegetable gardens and several districts. Districts include Lamido (Sultan) compound, the artisanal activities, servants, administrative staff, hosts of mark, breeding, foodstuff storage facilities, and dwellings.

On the structural level the palace consists of a great wall of 800 m length and 7 m height, with a 1.50 m thickness at the base and 0.5 m at the top. Partition walls separate the various districts. The great enclosure wall comprises 6 doors which have the particular function of allowing entry and exit.

Important sections include the courtroom of Lamido (Sultan) and the large court of distribution for the various districts. Between the various districts, there are large traveling tracks which are rights of way. The hall and the courtroom are important buildings in the operation of the palace. The first is used both as entry and waiting room for Lamido's closest nobles. The courtroom is the place where the sovereign spends the most time in his day. The first enclosure of the palace, in the great wall covers approximately 3 ha, it is there that the Lamido resides. In the second enclosure to the north are the dwellings of nobles as well as major children of Lamido or Yérima as well as important persons in charge of defense. The primary festival area is located in the southern part of the palace, and the nobles' quarters are situated around it.

== History ==
It was built under the reign of Ngjidda (1798 - 1866) between 1805 and 1808.

== World Heritage status ==
This site was added to the UNESCO World Heritage Tentative List on April 18, 2006, in the Cultural category.
