= Musey language =

Chadic language of Chad and Cameroon

Musey
- Native to: Chad, Cameroon
- Native speakers: 430,000 (2005–2019)
- Language family: Afro-Asiatic: Chadic; Masa; North; Musey–Azumeina; Musey
- Writing system: Latin

Language codes
- ISO 639-3: mse
- Glottolog: muse1242

Musey is a Chadic language of Chad and Cameroon. There is a degree of mutual intelligibility with Masana. Although Musey and Masa are mutually unintelligible, many Musey speakers also speak Masa.

== Distribution ==
Musey is spoken east of Guéré, in the southern part of Mayo-Danay commune in Danay department, Far North Region, by 20,000 speakers in Cameroon. It is also spoken in Chad.

== Phonology ==
=== Consonants ===
| | | Labial | Alveolar | Lateral | Palatal | Velar | Glottal |
|---|---|---|---|---|---|---|---|
| Plosive | voiceless | p | t | | tʃ | k | ʔ |
| Plosive | voiced | b | d | | dʒ | ɡ | |
| Plosive | implosive | ɓ | ɗ | | | | |
| Plosive | prenasalized | mb | nd | | nd͡ʒ | ŋɡ | |
| Fricative | voiceless | f | s | ɬ | | | h |
| Fricative | voiced | v | z | ɮ | | | ɦ |
| Nasal | | m | n | | | ŋ | |
| Flap | | | ɾ | | | | |
| Approximant | | w | | l | j | | |

=== Vowels ===
| | Front | Central | Back |
|---|---|---|---|
| Close | i | | u |
| Mid | e | | o |
| Open | | a | |

Lax allophones of /i u e o/ occur as [ɪ ʊ ɛ ɔ].
