= Mbere language (Adamawa) =

Mbum language of southern Chad

Sakpu
- Native to: Chad
- Native speakers: (1,000 speakers of Mbere, Sakpu, Karang, and Ngomi together cited 1995)
- Language family: Niger–Congo?: Atlantic–Congo; Volta-Congo; Mbum–Day; Mbum languages; Southern; Sakpu

Language codes
- ISO 639-3: None (mis)
- Glottolog: mber1254

Sakpu is an Mbum language of southern Chad.

== Sources ==
- Roger Blench, 2004. List of Adamawa languages (ms)
