= Masa people =

Chadic ethnic group

Masa
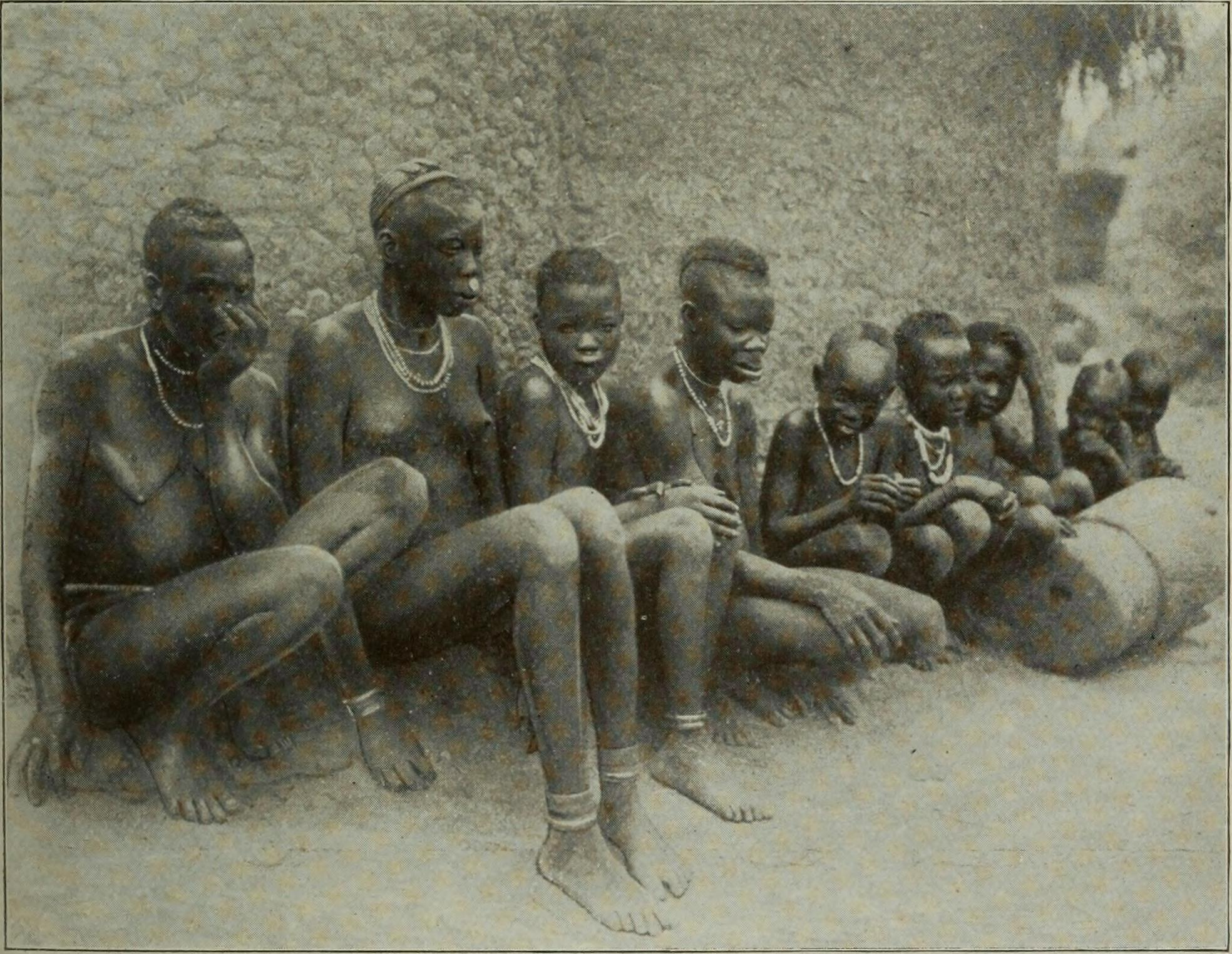
- Photo of Masa women and children. 1913.

Total population
- 266,000–469,000

Regions with significant populations
- Cameroon: 266,000–318,000
- Chad: 150,000

Languages
- Massa language

Religion
- Christianity (30%), Evangelical Christian (10%), Islam (50%)

Related ethnic groups
- Other Chadic peoples

The Masa or Massa people, also called Masana, Banana, or Yagoua, are a Chadic ethnic group in Cameroon and Chad. They are often grouped together with several together ethnic groups, who are collectively referred to as the Kirdi people.

The Masa have an estimated population of 266,000 to 469,000, with the majority residing in Cameroon. Most of them speak the Massa language.

== History ==
The Massa are said to be related to the Tikar and Bamileke peoples. Their oral tradition cites that they left Sudan and arrived in northern Cameroon before the Tikar people. When Muslims entered the region to convert locals, the Massa stayed, while the Tikar fled to the south. In 1881, Sheikh Hayatu Balda declared jihad upon the surrounding non-Muslim populations of Musgum, Massa, and Sumeya peoples. The Musgum claim a Massa origin through the union between a Kotoko prince and a Massa woman.

== Culture ==
=== Religion ===
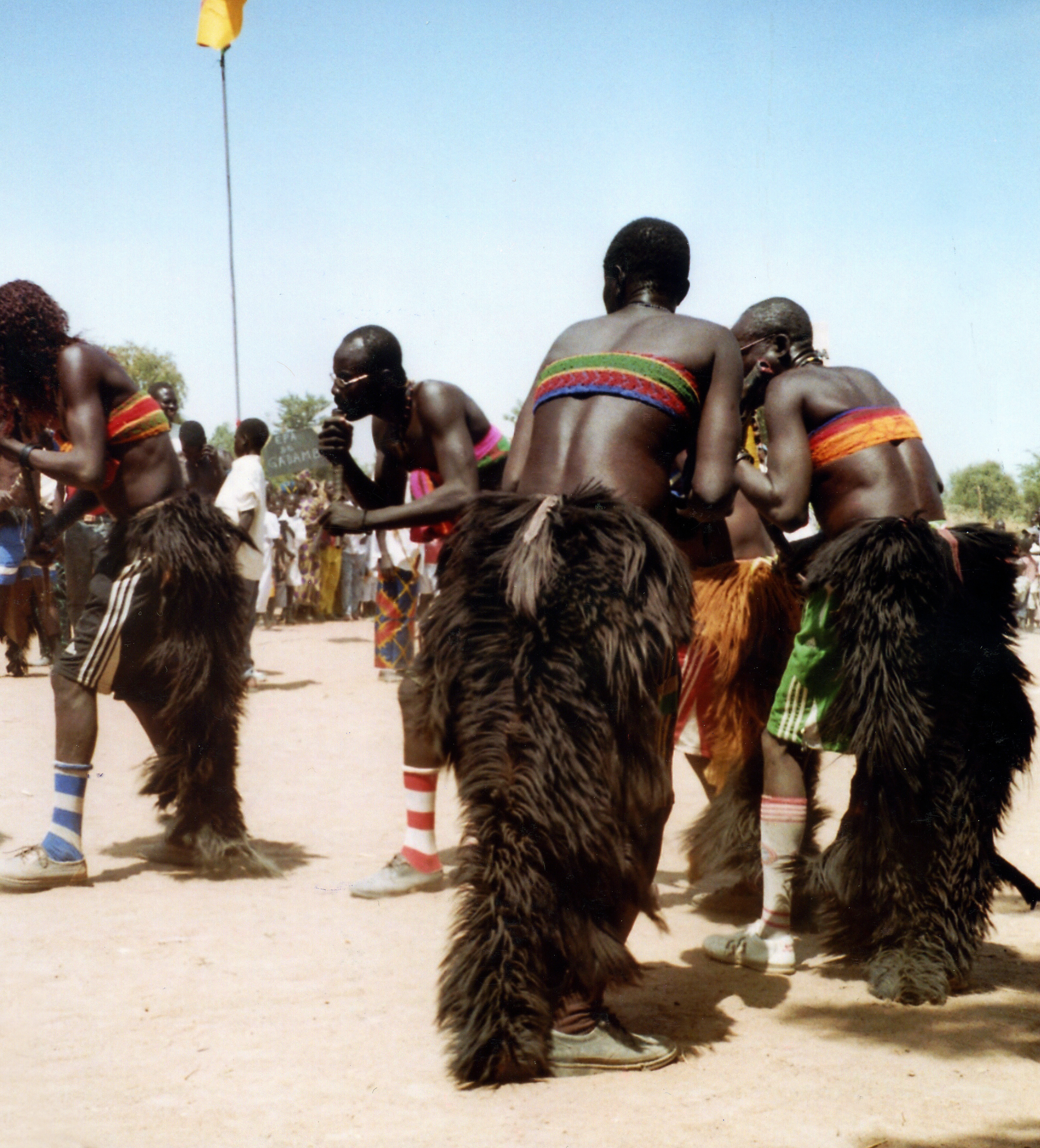
Masa dance in Chad. Photo by Luiclemens

50% of the population is Muslim, and other 50% is Christian. Thirty percent are mainline Catholics or Protestants; another fifteen percent are Evangelical Christians. There are often clashes between the different religious groups.

=== Farming and fishing ===
The Massa enjoy the most diversified food resources (Garine 1964). They cultivate their staple, early red sorghum (Sorghum caudatum) and also engage all year round in profitable fishing in the Logone River and its affluent. Over the last thirty years the introduction of cash crops has influenced food economy through monetarisation and by the extensive cultivation of a new staple, rice, which is cultivated mainly by northern Massa. They also grow some groundnuts.

The Massa settled on river banks in order to practice fishing. As a result, they have a monotonous diet to accompany their fish sauces - sorrel, okra and false sesame. Because they are such good weavers, have developed a broad range of fishing devices and techniques that allows them to also become fresh and dried fish traders.

=== Formalised fighting over livestock or honour ===
Above all, the Massa are cattle lovers. Most of the social activities are centered around cattle ownership, including bride prices. A wife will cost a man cows. The massa also participate incattle lending, or golla and traditional cow fattening cures, called gurna. In many cases, there have been pitched battles between Masa from Cameroon and Masa from Chad. These clashes result in many wounded. The battles are often caused by the theft of cows, because livestock are extremely important in social relations and especially in the "marriage exchanges" of the society. An act of adultery can also be a catalyst for Masa groups to go to war. Men who participate in the battles have helmets and clubs. They use sticks and stones as weapons and fight in lines while they are encouraged by women.

In the battle between two groups of Masa, several rules must be met: collect the wounded from combat; do not hit a man on the ground nor one who is wounded. The fighting must end at dusk. Injured people usually are cured by traditional healers, who cure through several techniques which they exercise with local resources. Women who participate in this kind of fight acquire prestige in Masa society.
