= Mambay language =

Mbum language spoken in Cameroon and Chad

Mambay
- Mangbai
- Native to: Cameroon, Chad
- Native speakers: 14,000 (2002–2011)
- Language family: Niger–Congo?: Atlantic–Congo; Mbum–Day; Mbum; Northern Mbum; Tupuri–Mambai; Mambay

Language codes
- ISO 639-3: mcs
- Glottolog: mamb1294
- ELP: Mambai

Mambay (Mamgbay, Mangbai) is a Mbum language of northern Cameroon and southern Chad.

== Distribution ==
In Cameroon, Mambay is spoken along the Mayo-Kebi River near the Chadian border, in the Djaloumé region (northern end of Bibemi commune, Bénoué department), where there is a massif called Hosséré Mambay. It is also spoken in the extreme southeast of Figuil commune, Mayo-Louti department. In Cameroon and Chad, there is a total of about 2,500 speakers, many of whom also speak Mundang.

== Phonology ==
=== Consonants ===
29 consonants are present in Mambay.

Consonants of Mambay
		Labial	Coronal	Dorsal		Glottal
		Labial	Coronal	plain	lab.	Glottal
Nasal	plain	m	n	ŋ		
Nasal	glottalic	ˀm	ˀn	ˀŋ		
Stop	voiceless	p	t	k	kp	
Stop	voiced	b	d	ɡ	ɡb	
Fricative	voiceless	f	s			
Fricative	voiced	v	z			
Vibrant		ⱱ̟	r			
Glottalic		ɓ	ɗ	ˀj	ˀw	ʔ
Approximant			l	j	w	h

All information below comes from Anonby (2008).

==== Loans ====
The affricate [dʒ] and the prenasalized consonants [ᵐb ⁿd ᵑɡ] are found in loan words from Fula.

==== Obstruents ====
The bilabial /p b/ and velar /k ɡ/ plosives, as well as the labiodental /f v/ and alveolar /s z/ fricatives, only have a voiced–voiceless contrast in morpheme-initial position; elsewhere, the contrast is absent.

In syllable codas, medial, and final positions, the bilabial /p ~ b/ and alveolar /t ~ d/ plosives are realized as unreleased voiceless, [p̚] and [t̚].

When lacking voicing contrast, the velar plosives /k ~ ɡ/ are realized as:

- unreleased voiceless velar plosive [k̚] after front vowels in syllable codas, medial (in careful speech) and final positions
- unreleased voiceless uvular plosive [q̚] after back vowels in syllable codas, medial (in careful speech) and final positions
- voiced velar fricative [ɣ] after front vowels in medial position (in typical and fast speech)
- voiced uvular fricative [ʁ] after back vowels in medial position (in typical and fast speech)

==== Glottalics ====
The bilabial glottalic /ɓ/ is realized as:

- voiced implosive [ɓ] in initial position
- preglottalized voiced implosive [ˀɓ] in medial position
- preglottalized and unreleased voiceless plosive [ˀp̚] in syllabe coda

The alveolar glottalic /ɗ/ is realized as:

- retroflex implosive [ᶑ ] in initial position
- preglottalized retroflex implosive [ˀᶑ ] in medial position
- preglottalized and glottalized lateral approximant [ˀl̰ ] in syllable coda

The contrastive status of the glottal stop /ʔ/ as an independent consonant is uncertain (see § Semivowels). The patterning of the glottal fricative /h/ is also uncertain. When preceding long vowels, the semivowels /j w/ alternate with [h] in initial (both morpheme- and syllable-initial) positions.

==== Rhotic ====
The alveolar /r/ is realized as:

- retroflex flap [ɽ] in initial and medial position
- alveolar trill [r] in syllable coda, and less commonly in initial position

==== Semivowels ====
The palatal semivowel /j/ is nasalized [j̃] when adjacent to nasal vowels. In contrast, the labiovelar semivowel /w/ does not have a stable nasalized realization [w̃] when adjacent to nasal vowels. However, the nasal labiovelar [ŋʷ ~ w̃] may behave similarly to [w] when before back vowels, with both merging to [h], suggesting /w/ may be the underlying phoneme.

If the glottal stop is interpreted as contrastive, then the preglottalized palatal /ˀj/ and labiovelar /ˀw/ semivowels are analyzed as clusters, [ʔj] and [ʔw]. Before nasalized and pharyngealized close vowels, /ˀj/ is realized as an epiglottal trilled affricate [ʡʢ].

==== Nasals ====
The palatal nasals [ɲ ˀɲ] are found in a subset of onset and coda positions, but are realized as nasalized semivowels [j̃ ˀj̃] in medial position after nasal segments. Anonby (2008) analyzes these sounds as nasal variants of the palatal semivowels /j ˀj/.

The velar nasal /ŋ/ is realized as palatal [ɲ] after front vowels; however, if it is followed by a velar plosive /k g/, then its articulation remains velar. Anonby (2008)'s data did not include any examples of the preglottalized velar nasal /ˀŋ/ after front vowels, so a conclusion about its realizations was not made. Labialized velar nasals [ŋʷ ˀŋʷ] are found in a subset of onset and coda positions, but are realized as nasalized semivowels [w̃ ˀw̃] in medial position after nasal segments. Anonby (2008) analyzes these sounds as nasal variants of the labiovelar semivowels /w ˀw/.

==== Pharyngealization ====
Pharyngeal articulations are particularly challenging to analyze in Mambay. Three possible explanations exist:

- that pharyngealization is a quality of consonants;
- that pharyngealization is a quality of vowels;
- that pharyngealization is a suprasegmental feature associated with larger units such as syllables and syllable rhymes

All three have their own limitations, with a vocalic interpretation as a best fit for morpheme structures and phonologically suitable. This interpretation is used throughout Anonby (2008).

=== Vowels ===
Five vowel units are present in Mambay. These units are modified by length, nasalization, pharyngealization, and glottalization, creating a total of 30 qualities.

Vowels according to Anonby (2008)
		Front				Central				Back			
		short	long	glott.	phar.	short	long	glott.	phar.	short	long	glott.	phar.
High	oral	i	iː	iˀ						u	uː	uˀ	
High	nasal	ĩ	ĩː	ĩˀ	ĩˤ					ũ	ũː	ũˀ	ũˤ
Mid	oral	e	eː	eˀ	eˤ					o	oː	oˀ	oˤ
Low	oral					a	aː	aˀ	aˤ				
Low	nasal					ã	ãː	ãˀ	ãˤ				

Nasal mid vowels (*/ẽ õ/ and variants) and high oral pharyngeal vowels (*/iˤ uˤ/) are absent from Mambay. Glottalized and pharyngealized vowels do not contrast length, and cannot co-occur on a single vowel.
