= To language =

Mbum language of Cameroon and the CAR

To
- Native to: Cameroon, Central African Republic
- Native speakers: None (2nd-language use only)
- Language family: Niger–Congo?: Atlantic–Congo; Mbum–Day; Mbum; (unclassified); To

Language codes
- ISO 639-3: toz
- Glottolog: tooo1238
- ELP: To

To is an unclassified Mbum language of northern Cameroon and the Central African Republic. It is only used as a second language, as the secret male initiation language of the Gbaya.
