= Mesme language =

Afro-Asiatic language spoken in Chad

Mesmé
- Zime
- Native to: Chad
- Native speakers: (20,000 cited 1993 census)
- Language family: Afro-Asiatic: Chadic; Masa; South; Mesmé
- Dialects: Bero; Zamre
- Writing system: Latin

Language codes
- ISO 639-3: zim
- Glottolog: mesm1239

Mesmé is an Afro-Asiatic language of Chad. Zime (Djime) is a generic name.
