= Lago delle Lame =

Lake in Italy

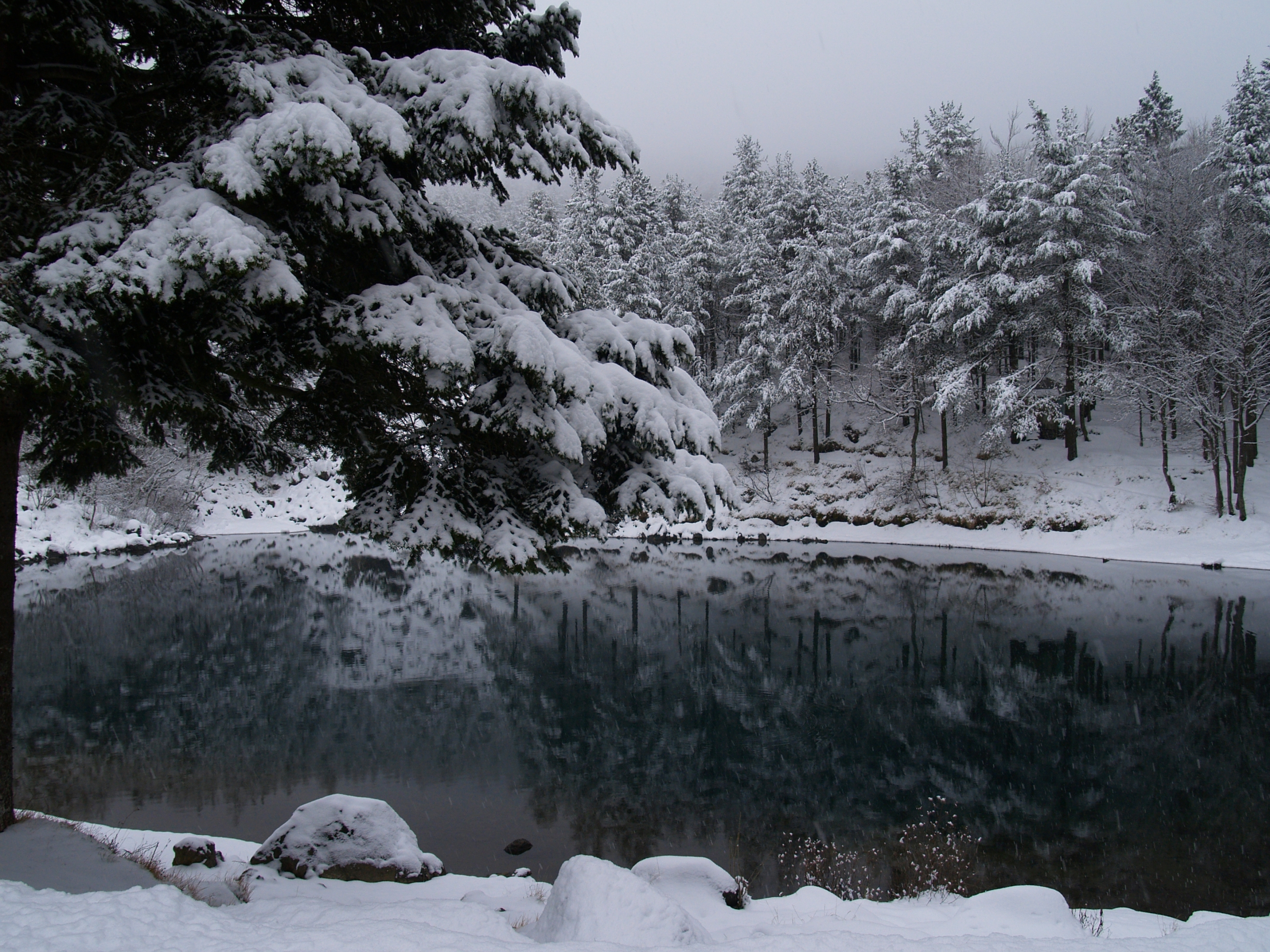

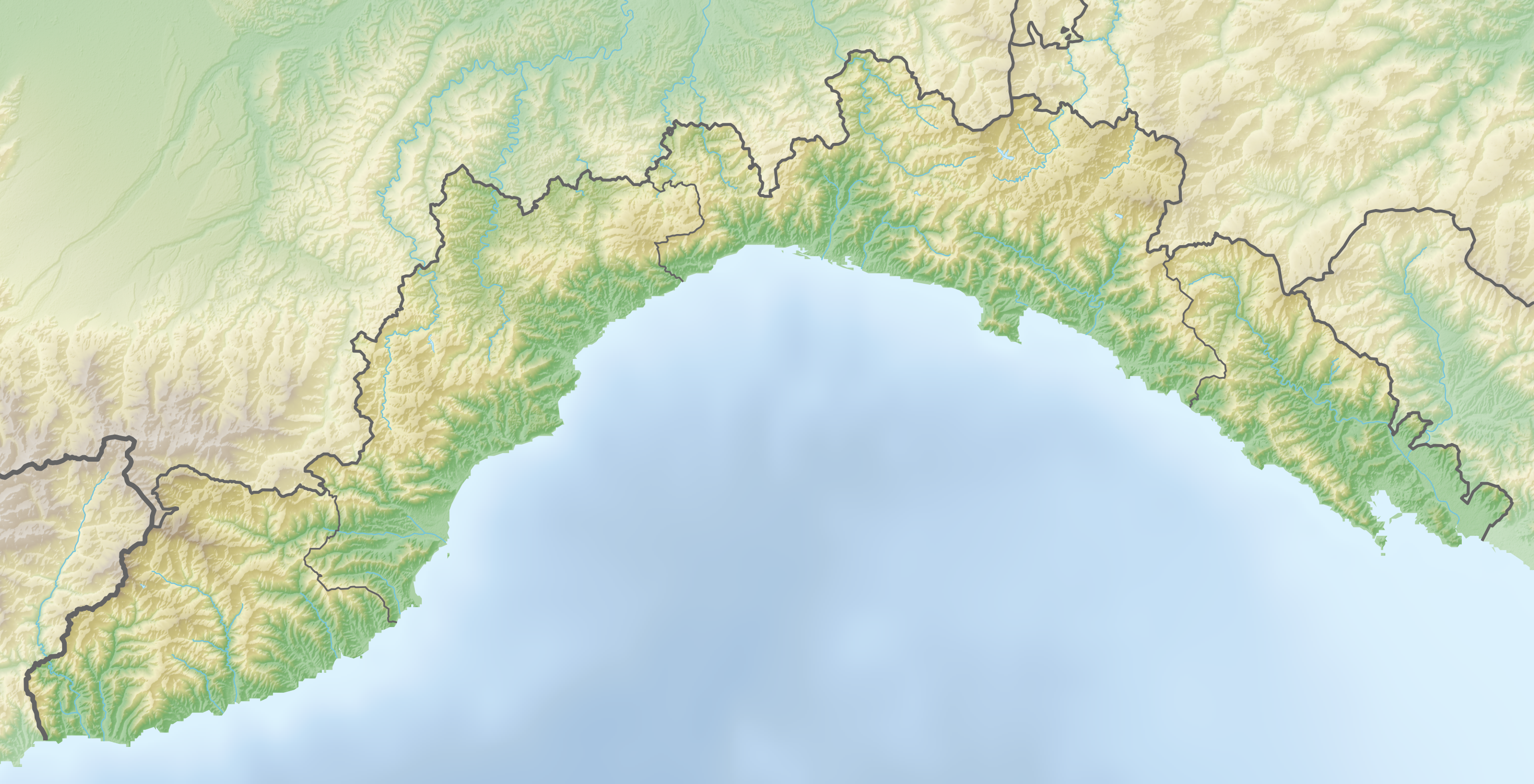
- Location within Liguria
- Location: Province of Genova, Liguria
- Coordinates: 44.503007°N 9.409034°E
- Basin countries: Italy
- Surface elevation: 1,085 m (3,560 ft)

Lago delle Lame is a glacial lake in the Province of Genova, Liguria, Italy.
