= Mbum languages =

Adamawa language group of central Africa

Mbum
- Kebi-Benue
- Geographic distribution: southern Chad, northwestern CAR, northern Cameroon, eastern Nigeria
- Linguistic classification: Niger–Congo?: Atlantic–Congo; Savannas; Mbum–Day; Mbum
- Subdivisions: Central; Northern; Mbum

Language codes
- Glottolog: mbum1257

The Mbum or Kebi-Benue languages (also known as Lakka in narrower scope) are a group of the Mbum–Day branch of the Adamawa languages, spoken in southern Chad, northwestern Central African Republic, northern Cameroon and eastern Nigeria. Their best-known member is Mbum; other languages in the group include Tupuri and Kare.

They were labeled "G6" in Joseph Greenberg's Adamawa language-family proposal.

== Languages ==
- Southern Mbum: Mbum proper, Mbere, Gbete
- Central Mbum
  - Karang: Karang (Mbum, Laka), Nzakambay (Njak Mbai), Pana, Ngumi, Kare (Kãrɛ̃)
  - Koh: Kuo (Koh), Sakpu
- Northern Mbum
  - Dama–Galke: Dama, Ndai (Galke, Pormi), Mono, Kali
  - Tupuri–Mambai: Mangbai, Mundang, Tupuri

In addition, Pondo, Gonge, Tale, Laka, Pam and To are unclassified within Mbum. To is a secret male initiation language of the Gbaya. Dek is purported in some sources but apparently unattested.

La'bi, an esoteric ritual language of male initiation among the Gbaya Kara, the Mbum, and some Sara Laka, is related to Mbum. It has substantial loans from one or more Sara languages. Other initiation languages in the Mbum family are To (Gbaya, but with partial Mbum origins), Dzel, and Ngarage.

== See also ==
- List of Proto-Lakka reconstructions (Wiktionary)
