= Mandingring =

Coordinates: 8.4559°N 15.0071°E

- Commune and town
- Interactive map of Mandingring
- Country: Cameroon
- Time zone: UTC+1 (WAT)

Mandingring is a town and commune in Cameroon.

== See also ==
- Communes of Cameroon
