= List of people known as the Lame =

The Lame is an epithet which may refer to:

- Charles II of Naples (1254–1309), King of Naples, King of Albania, Prince of Salerno, Prince of Achaea, Count of Provence and Count of Anjou
- Eric XI of Sweden (1216–1250), King of Sweden
- Hermann of Reichenau (1013–1054), German scholar, composer, music theorist, mathematician and astronomer
- Joan the Lame of Burgundy (1293–1348), Queen of France
- Joan of Penthièvre, Duchess of Brittany (c. 1324–1384)
- Joan of France, Duchess of Brittany, Queen of France
- Lothair the Lame (c. 848–865), a son of Emperor Charles the Bald
- Louis I, Duke of Bourbon (1279–1342), also Count of Clermont-en-Beauvaisis and La Marche
- Topal Osman (1883–1923), also known as Osman the Lame, Ottoman officer, militia leader
- Otto IV, Duke of Brunswick-Lüneburg (died 1446), also Prince of Lüneburg
- Peter the Lame, Prince of Moldavia (1574–1577, 1578–1579 and 1583–1591)
- Sigobert the Lame (died c. 509), a king of the Franks
- Timur the Lame (1336–1405), Turko-Mongol ruler better known as Tamurlane
