= Masa languages =

Masa
- Geographic distribution: southwestern Chad and northern Cameroon
- Linguistic classification: Afro-Asiatic: Chadic; Masa
- Subdivisions: North Masa; South Masa

Language codes
- Glottolog: masa1323

The Masa languages are a group of closely related Chadic languages of southwestern Chad and northern Cameroon.

== Languages ==
The exonym Zime is used for the Herdé, Ngeté, Pévé, and Mesmé. Similarly, Kaɗo is a generic name for the Peve–Kaɗo languages, a couple of which are called Lamé as well.

Shryock (1997: 32) subgroups the Masa languages as:

- Zumaya †
- North: Masa; Musey; Marba, Monogoy
- South: Zime; Peve; Heɗe-Ngiɗe

== Numerals ==
Comparison of numerals in individual languages:

Language	1	2	3	4	5	6	7	8	9	10
Herdé (Zime)	ɗàw	hʷóèɓ	hī́ndʒìʔ	fíɗíʔ	vàɬ	kāŋɡīʔ	sēɗā	tʃɔ̀hòʔ	tēfer̄ɗɛw	ɡùɓ
Marba (1)	tú	mbà	híndí	fíɗí	váɬ	kárɡéyá	kíɗìzíyà	ʔàklávándí	ɬéŋá	dóɡò
Marba (2)	tù	mbà	ɦìndí	fíɗí	vàɬ	kàraɡàyà	sìdìzìjá	klàvàndì	ɮèèŋà	dòk / dòɡò
Masana (Massa)	kèp, tù, tùm	màʔ	ɦìdí	fìɗì	vàɬ	kàrɡìjà	sìdìjà	ɡlàvàndí	ɮèŋè	dòòk
Mesme (Zime)	ɗāw	hɔ̀ɓ	hīndì	fíɗí	vàtl	kāndī	sēɗā	tʃɔ̃hō̃	tɛ̄rfīɗɛ̄w	ɡùɓ / ɡùp
Musey (Musei) (1)	dèw	ɓà	híndí	fídí	fàɬ	kárɡìyá	kídísìyá	kálvàndì	ɬèŋŋè	dòɡò
Musey (Musei) (2)	dèw	mbà	ɦìndì	fídí	vàɬ	kàrɡìjá	kìdìzìjá	kàlvàndì	ɮèŋè	dòk / dòɡò
Pévé (1)	ɗaw	hoɓ	hínjiʔ	fə́ɗiʔ	váɬ	kánkiʔ	syéɗaʔ *	tsóhoʔ	tʃéfaɗew	ɡuɓ
Pévé (2)	ɗao	hwōɓ	hínjī	fúɗī	vātl	kánkí	sédā	tʃóhō	tʃéfāɗēo	ɡwúɓ

== See also ==
- List of Proto-Masa reconstructions (Wiktionary)
