= Massa language =

Chadic language spoken in Chad and Cameroon

Massa
- Masana
- Native to: Chad, Cameroon
- Native speakers: (340,000 cited 1982–2019)
- Language family: Afro-Asiatic: Chadic; Masa; North; Massa
- Dialects: Yagwa; Bongor; Wina; Walia; Domo; Gizay; Gumay; Ham; Budugum
- Writing system: Latin

Language codes
- ISO 639-3: mcn
- Glottolog: masa1322 Masana gize1234 Gizey hama1241 Ham

Massa (or Masana, Masa) is a Chadic language spoken in southern Chad and northern Cameroon by the Masa people. It has approximately 200,000 speakers.

Dialects are Bongor, Bugudum (Budugum), Domo, Gizay, Gumay, Ham, Walia, Wina (Viri), Yagwa.

Kim, a neighbouring language, was once misclassified as Masa.

== Distribution ==
Masa is spoken in the southern part of Mayo-Danay department in the Far North Region, in the arrondissements of Yagoua, Kalfou, Wina, Yele, and Guéré.

Central Masa is spoken along the Logone River, with four varieties. The varieties, as listed from north to south, are: Yagwa (spoken around Yagoua), Domo (in Domo village), Walya, and Buguëum.

Western Masa includes Gizay, spoken around Guéré, and Viri (Wina), former ethnic Tupuri who had shifted to the Masa language.

The Muzuk dialect, which has long been considered a Munjuk dialect (ALCAM 1983), is in fact a Masa dialect since it is clearly mutually intelligible with the other Masa varieties (Ousmanou 2007). The speakers of Muzuk are bilingual, and speaking the Muzuk dialect of Masa, as well as Munjuk. It is spoken in the drier areas of the West (Guidigis, Mayo-Kani, Far North Region).

Masa is spoken in Cameroon and Chad, with 103,000 speakers in Cameroon.

== Phonology ==
=== Consonants ===
		Labial	Alveolar	Lateral	Palatal	Velar	Glottal
Plosive	voiceless	p	t		tʃ	k	ʔ
Plosive	voiced	b	d		dʒ	ɡ	
Plosive	implosive	ɓ	ɗ				
Fricative	voiceless	f	s	ɬ			h
Fricative	voiced	v	z	ɮ			ɦ
Nasal		m	n			ŋ	
Trill			r				
Approximant		w		l	j		

=== Vowels ===
	Front	Central	Back
Close	i iː		u uː
Mid	e eː		o oː
Open		a aː	
