= Rey Bouba =

- City
- Location in Cameroon
- Coordinates: 8.672°N 14.179°E
- Country: Cameroon
- Region: North
- Department: Mayo-Rey

Rey Bouba is a city in North Region, Cameroon. It was the centre of the Lamidat (Sultanate) of Rey Bouba, a vassal state to the Yola Emirate which was a vassal to the Sokoto Caliphate. The inhabitants of Rey Bouba (the Boubandjidda) were of Hausa-Fulani origin.

The Palace of Rey Bouba is located within the city.

== See also ==
- Communes of Cameroon
