= Ngeté-Herdé language =

Afroasiatic dialect cluster of Chad

Ngeté-Herdé
- Lame
- Zime
- Native to: Chad
- Native speakers: (50,000 cited 1991–1999)
- Language family: Afro-Asiatic: Chadic; Masa; South; Peve–Kaɗo; Ngeté-Herdé
- Dialects: Dzəpaw; Ngeté; He’dé

Language codes
- ISO 639-3: Either: nnn – Ngete hed – Herdé
- Glottolog: nget1241 Ngete herd1236 Herde

Ngeté-Herdé, also known as Lamé, is an Afroasiatic dialect cluster of Chad. Varieties are:

- Dzəpaw, or Lamé
- Ngeté (Nguetté), or Sorga-Ngeté
- Herdé (He’dé), or Heɗe-Rong

Zime is a generic name.

== Phonology ==
The following is the He’dé dialect:

=== Consonants ===
		Labial	Alveolar		Post-alv./ Palatal		Velar	Glottal
		Labial	plain	lateral	Post-alv./ Palatal		Velar	Glottal
Nasal		m	n		ɲ		ŋ	
Stop/ Affricate	voiceless	p	t		t͡ʃ		k	ʔ
Stop/ Affricate	voiced	b	d		d͡ʒ		ɡ	
Stop/ Affricate	prenasal	ᵐb	ⁿd		ⁿd͡ʒ		ᵑɡ	
Stop/ Affricate	implosive	ɓ	ɗ					
Fricative	voiceless	f	s	ɬ				h
Fricative	voiced	v	z	ɮ				ɦ
Tap/Trill		ⱱ	r					
Approximant				l	j	ˀj	w	

/w/ may occasionally be heard as a labio-palatal [ɥ] when before front vowels.

Sounds /t͡ʃ, d͡ʒ, ⁿd͡ʒ/ are realized as affricates [t͡s, d͡z, ⁿd͡z] among other dialects.

=== Vowels ===
	Front	Central	Back
Close	i ĩ		u ũ
Mid	e ẽ	ə ə̃	o õ
Open		a ã	

Sounds /e, ẽ/ and /o, õ/ may also be realized as more open [ɛ, ɛ̃] and [ɔ, ɔ̃], when in syllable-final positions.
