= Bétaré-Oya =

Coordinates: 5°36′N 14°05′E

- Commune and town
- Interactive map of Bétaré-Oya
- Country: Cameroon
- Region: East
- Time zone: UTC+1 (WAT)

Bétaré-Oya is a town and commune in Cameroon.

== See also ==
- Communes of Cameroon
