= Touboro =

- Commune and town
- Location in Cameroon
- Coordinates: 7°46′15″N 15°21′24″E
- Country: Cameroon
- Region: North
- Department: Mayo-Rey
- Elevation: 509 m (1,670 ft)

Population (2012)
  - Total: 23,196
- Time zone: UTC+1 (WAT)

Touboro is a town and commune in North Region Cameroon.

== Refugees ==
An April 10, 2014 report says:

"Thousands of refugees, fleeing the violence of armed groups (Séléka and Anti-balaka) are concentrated in the towns of Mbaimboum and Touboro, on the border between the two Countries. Neither the local authorities nor international organizations are providing care for these people, who are left on their own or, in the best cases, can count on the solidarity of relatives and friends from Cameroon."

== See also ==
- Communes of Cameroon
