= Mayo-Rey =

- Department
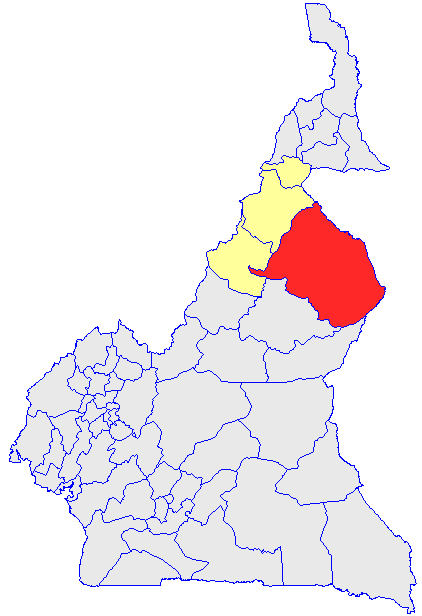
- Department location in Cameroon
- Country: Cameroon
- Province: North Province
- Capital: Tcholliré

Area
  - Total: 36,529 km^{2} (14,104 sq mi)

Population (2001)
  - Total: 242,441
  - Density: 6.6369/km^{2} (17.190/sq mi)
- Time zone: UTC+1 (WAT)

Mayo-Rey is a department of North Province in Cameroon. The department covers an area of 36,529 km^{2} and as of 2001 had a total population of 242,441 . The capital of the department lies at Tcholliré.

== Spillover of CAR War ==
According to the Fides News Agency, as of 10 April 2014,

There is growing concern in Cameroon for the influx of refugees from the neighboring Central African Republic in the department of Mayo-Rey, in the north of the Country. Thousands of refugees, fleeing the violence of armed groups (Séléka and Anti-balaka) are concentrated in the towns of Mbaimboum and Touboro, on the border between the two Countries. Neither the local authorities nor international organizations are providing care for these people, who are left on their own or, in the best cases, can count on the solidarity of relatives and friends from Cameroon.

From the testimony gathered by Fides Agency, several refugees report to the local press that they come and go across the border depending on the situation in their Country of origin. According to local traders, there are bandits and guerrillas among Central Africans who take refuge in Cameroon who hide weapons in the territory of Cameroon and then carry out assaults in Central Africa. On the Cameroonian side, there has been an increase in robberies and assaults against cars along the roads.

== Subdivisions ==
The department is divided administratively into 4 communes and in turn into villages.

=== Communes ===
- Mandingring
- Tcholliré
- Touboro
- Rey Bouba
