= Mundang language =

Mbum language spoken in Chad and Cameroon

Mundang
- zah Mundaŋ
- Native to: Chad, Cameroon
- Native speakers: (400,000 cited 1982–2019)
- Language family: Niger–Congo?: Atlantic–Congo; Mbum–Day; Mbum; Northern Mbum; Tupuri–Mambai; Mundang
- Dialects: Kabi (Kieziere); Zasing (Torrock-Kaélé, Yasing); Gelama

Language codes
- ISO 639-3: mua
- Glottolog: mund1325

Mundang is an Mbum language of southern Chad and northern Cameroon, spoken by the Mundang people.

The Gelama dialect of Cameroon may be a separate language.

== Distribution ==
Mundang, spoken in Cameroon by 44,700 speakers (SIL 1982), is mainly spoken in Mayo-Kani department, Far North Region, in the communes of Mindif, Moulvouday, and Kaélé. It is also spoken to a lesser extent in the south of Mayo-Kebi, in the east of Bibemi commune (Bénoué department, Northern Region), towards the Chadian border. Mundang of Lere (in Chad) and Mundang of Cameroon (centered in Lara and Kaélé) are highly similar.

== Phonology ==
=== Consonants ===
| | | Labial | Alveolar | Palatal | Velar | Labio- velar | Glottal |
|---|---|---|---|---|---|---|---|
| Plosive/ Affricate | voiceless | p | t | t͡ʃ | k | k͡p | ʔ |
| Plosive/ Affricate | voiced | b | d | d͡ʒ | ɡ | ɡ͡b | |
| Plosive/ Affricate | prenasal | ᵐb | ⁿd | ᶮd͡ʒ | ᵑɡ | ᵑᵐɡ͡b | |
| Plosive/ Affricate | implosive | ɓ | ɗ | | | | |
| Fricative | voiceless | f | s | ʃ | | | h |
| Fricative | voiced | v | z | ʒ | | | |
| Nasal | voiced | m | n | | ŋ | | |
| Nasal | glottalized | ˀm | ˀn | | | | |
| Tap | | ⱱ | ɾ | | | | |
| Lateral | | | l | | | | |
| Glide | central | | | j | | w | |
| Glide | glottalized | | | ʔj | | ʔw | |

- /ɓ, ɗ/ may also be heard as laryngealized [ɓ̰, ɗ̰] among speakers.
- /ʔw/ can also be heard as two laryngealized allophones [ʔv̰, ʔw̰].
- Sounds /ɓ, k/ may be heard as fricatives [β, ɣ] in intervocalic positions.
- /h, w/ may be heard as palatal [ç, ɥ] when preceding /i/.
- /ɾ/ can also range to a retroflex [ɽ] among dialects or a trill [r] when geminated.

=== Vowels ===
Oral vowels
| | Front | Central | Back |
|---|---|---|---|
| Close | i iː | ə | u uː |
| Near-close | ɪ ɪː | ə | ʊ ʊː |
| Close-mid | e eː | ə | o oː |
| Open-mid | ɛ ɛː | | ɔ ɔː |
| Open | | a aː | |

- /ə/ may also range to a close [ɨ].

Nasal vowels
| | Front | Central | Back |
|---|---|---|---|
| Close | ĩ ĩː | | ũː |
| Near-close | ɪ̃ ɪ̃ː | | ʊ̃ː |
| Open-mid | ɛ̃ː | | ɔ̃ː |
| Open | | ã ãː | |

== Writing system ==
Mundang alphabet
| Majuscules | A | B | Ɓ | C | D | Ɗ | E | Ə | F | G | H | I | J | K | L | M | N | Ŋ | O | P | R | S | T | U | V | W | Y | Z |
| Minuscules | a | b | ɓ | c | d | ɗ | e | ə | f | g | h | i | j | k | l | m | n | ŋ | o | p | r | s | t | u | v | w | y | z |

Nasalization is marked by a tilde: ã, ẽ, ə̃, ĩ, õ
