= Tcholliré =

Coordinates: 8°24′N 14°10′E

- Commune and town
- Interactive map of Tcholliré
- Country: Cameroon

Population
  - Total: 3.445
- Time zone: UTC+1 (WAT)

Tcholliré is a town and commune in Cameroon.

== Tcholliré Prison ==
Designed in 1965, the main prison of Tcholliré II was known as the Centre de Rééducation Civique (CRC) (Civic re-education Centre) until the reform of the prison regime in Cameroon in 1992. The former political prison has now become a "normal" prison.

Today, 200 inmates live in this prison whose capacity has been increased to 500 places. Four large buildings with a capacity of more than 100 places each serve as cells for the inmates of the main prison of Tcholliré II.

This prison has the peculiarity of only accommodating people who have been definitively sentenced. It houses exclusively men. There are no women's wings, let alone juvenile wings.

History teaches us that the Civic Re-education Centre (CRC) of Tcholliré was the materialisation in practice of Ordinance n° 62/OF/18 of 12 March 1962 on the repression of subversion. This Ordinance, which is hardly mentioned in the history books of Cameroon's secondary and high schools, had considerable effects on the whole of public and political life for three decades, between 1962 and 1990.

According to this text was subversive whoever "emitted or propagated noises, news, rumours or accurate news, when such noises, news, rumours or comments are likely to harm public authorities". An imprecise definition gave rise to numerous abuses. Under this Ordinance, many Cameroonians from all walks of life have been arrested, tortured and detained for many years, sometimes without trial, in the difficult conditions of prisons in Yoko (Central Region), Mantoum (Western Region), Tcholliré (Northern Region). Among the victims of this Ordinance are a host of political figures including Mgr Albert Ndongmo, a man of the Catholic Church sentenced to death in 1971 for conspiracy, locked up for five years in the Civic Re-education Centre of Tcholliré.

Since the advent of the return to a multi-party system and public liberties, the face of the Civic Re-education Centre of Tcholliré has changed. The Tcholliré II remand prison is located in a rural area where agricultural activities can be carried out. Tthe act establishing the Tcholliré II penitentiary makes it a main prison and not a specialised prison.

== See also ==
- Communes of Cameroon
