= Belel, Cameroon =

Belel
- Commune and town
- Interactive map of Belel
- Coordinates: 7°03′N 14°26′E
- Country: Cameroon
- Region: Adamawa Region
- Time zone: UTC+1 (WAT)

Belel is a town and commune in Cameroon.

== See also ==
- Communes of Cameroon
