= Martap =

- Commune and town
- Location in Cameroon
- Coordinates: 6°53′33″N 13°02′54″E
- Country: Cameroon
- Time zone: UTC+1 (WAT)

Martap is a town and commune in Cameroon.

== See also ==
- Communes of Cameroon
