= Vina (department) =

Vina Department
- Department
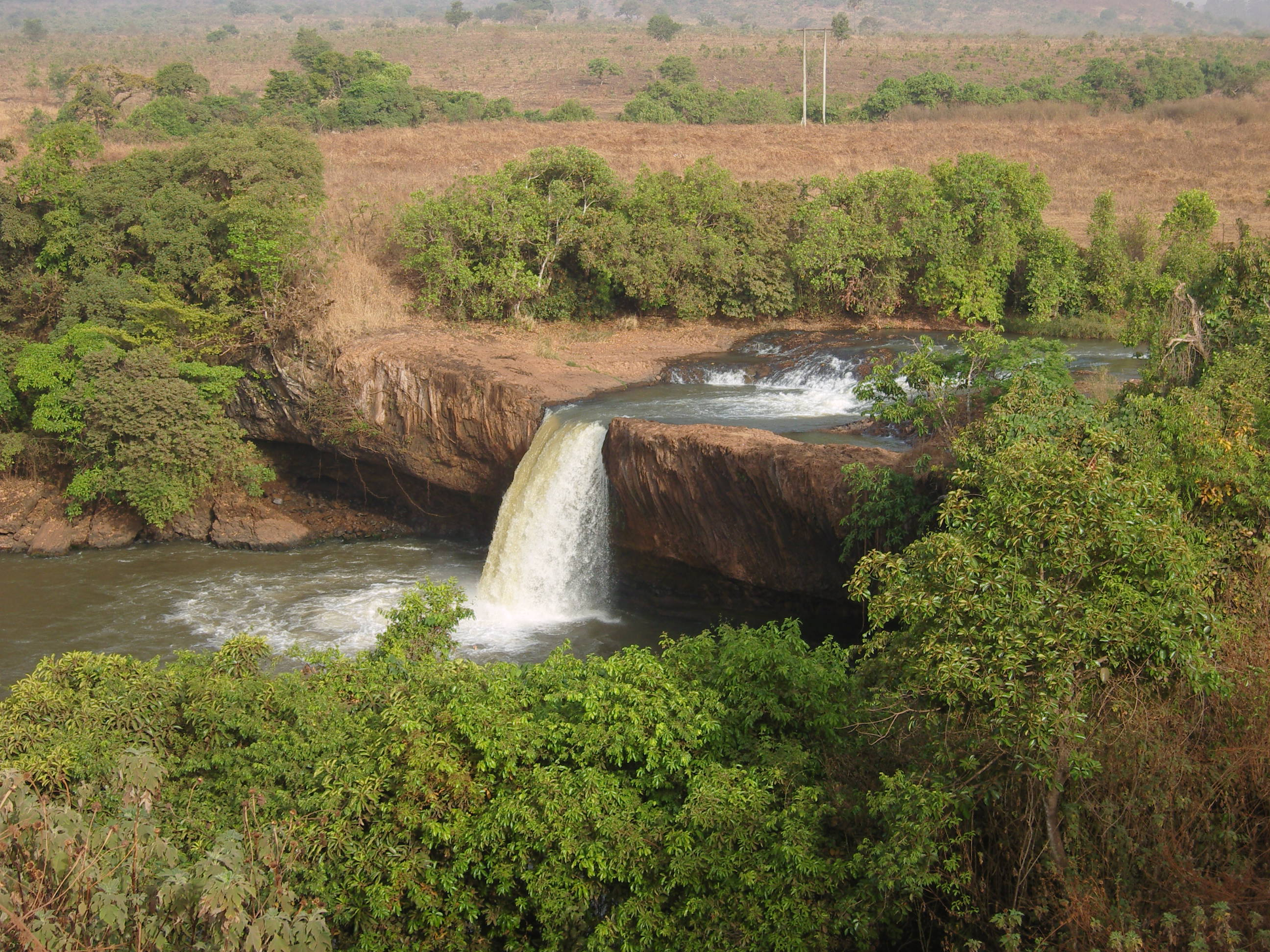
- Vina Waterfalls

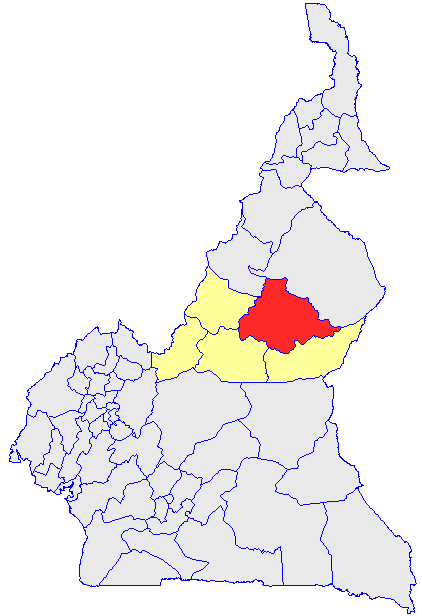
- Department location in Cameroon

- Location within Cameroon Location within Africa
- Country: Cameroon
- Province: Adamawa Province
- Capital: Ngaoundéré

Area
  - Total: 17,196 km^{2} (6,639 sq mi)

Population (2001)
  - Total: 247,427
  - Density: 14.389/km^{2} (37.266/sq mi)
- Time zone: UTC+1 (WAT)

Vina Department is a department (département) of the Adamawa Province in Cameroon. The department covers an area of 17,196 km^{2} and as of 2001 had a total population of 247,427. The capital of the department lies at Ngaoundéré.

== Subdivisions ==
The department is divided administratively into 7 communes and in turn into villages.

=== Communes ===
1. Belel
2. Mbe
3. Nganha
4. Ngaoundéré (urban)
5. Ngaoundéré (rural)
6. Nyambaka
7. Martap

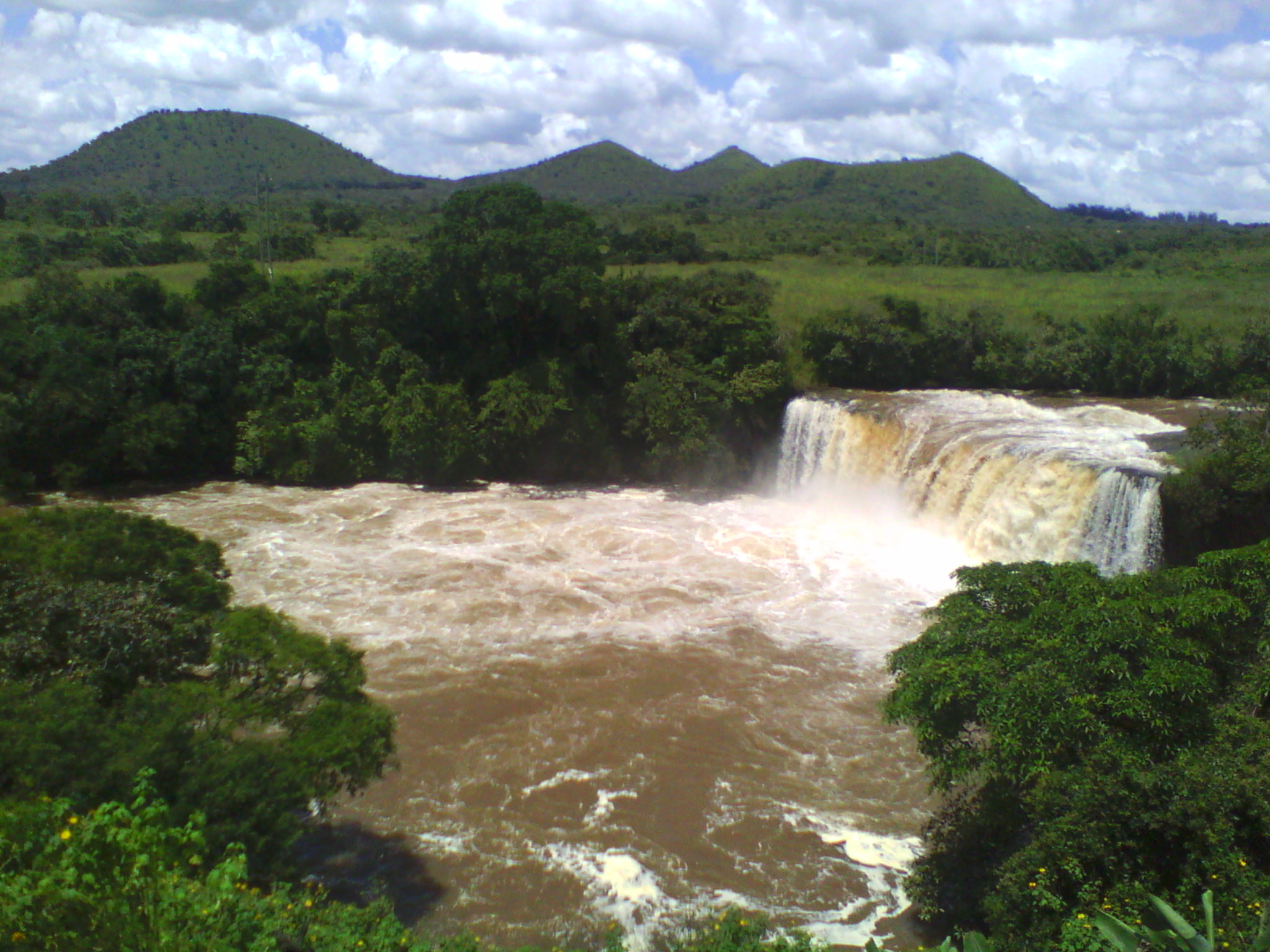
View of Vina waterfalls
