= Fufore =

- Town and Local government area
- Interactive map of Fufore
- Location within Nigeria
- Coordinates: 9°13′N 12°39′E
- Country: Nigeria
- State: Adamawa State

Government
  - Type: Local government area
  - Senator: Abbas Aminu Iya
  - Representative: Aliyu Wakili Boya

Area
  - Land: 5,169 km^{2} (1,996 sq mi)
- Highest elevation (Gurga): 905 m (2,969 ft)
- Lowest elevation: 237 m (778 ft)

Population (2006)
  - Total: 301,624
  - Density: 58.35/km^{2} (151.1/sq mi)
- Time zone: UTC+1 (West Africa Time)

Fufore is a town and local government area in Adamawa State, Nigeria.

== Demography ==
=== Languages ===
In a 2023 demographic survey of Internally displaced persons (IDPs), the most predominant languages (spoken at homes and places of primary residence) present in the local government area were; Fulfulde, specifically Eastern or Adamawa Fulfulde – 38.3%, Hausa – 26.1%, Chamba Donga – 10.1%, Bachama/Bwatiye – 3.4%, Kanuri – 3.4%, Yendang – 2.5%, Marghi – 2.4%, Mumuye – 1.8%, Lau (of Laka) – 1.8%, Kilba/South Marghi – 1.4%, Kamwe – 0.9%, Jukun – 0.9%, and twelve other languages spoken by populations below 1% each. This data was not obtained from a nationally co-ordinated population headcount. The last time Nigeria included ethnic and linguistic data in its enumeration parameters was in the national census of 1963.

== Geography ==
The Bagale and Shaffa Jauole lakes, two well-known lakes located inside the borders of Fufore LGA, with an average temperature of 34 °C. In Fufore LGA, there is an average of 18% humidity and 10 km/h of average wind speed.

=== Average Temperature ===
The period of intense heat spans for 2.0 months, commencing on February 26 and concluding on April 27, during which the average daily high temperature exceeds 38 °C (100 °F). April stands out as the hottest month in Fufore, boasting an average high of 39 °C (102 °F) and a low of 27 °C (81 °F).

Conversely, the cooler season endures for 3.3 months, starting on June 24 and ending on October 1, with an average daily high temperature below 33 °C (91 °F). The chilliest month of the year in Fufore is January, marked by an average low of 18 °C (64 °F) and a high of 33 °C (92 °F).

=== Topography ===
Fufore is located at 9.222 degrees latitude, 12.650 degrees longitude, and an elevation of 174 metres (571 feet) above sea level.

The terrain within a 3-kilometre (2 mi) radius of Fufore experiences only slight variations in elevation, with the most significant elevation difference being 85 metres (279 feet), and an average elevation of 176 metres (576 feet) above sea level. Within a 16-kilometre (10 mi) radius, the elevation changes are also relatively minor, with a maximum of 516 metres (1,693 feet). However, when considering a 80-kilometre (50 mi) radius, there are substantial elevation fluctuations, amounting to 1,696 metres (5,564 feet).

The land cover within a 3-kilometre (2 mi) radius of Fufore consists mainly of cropland (63%), grassland (15%), trees (11%), and shrubs (11%). Expanding the radius to 16 kilometres (10 mi), the predominant land cover includes cropland (52%) and shrubs (22%). In the broader area within 80 kilometres (50 mi), cropland (50%) and shrubs (26%) continue to dominate the landscape.

== Economy ==
With crops like millet, rice, beans, soya beans, and sorghum produced in the region, farming is the primary profession of the people of the Fufore local government area. The Gurin cattle market is only one of the several markets in the local government area that serve as viable platforms for locals to trade a variety of commodities and services, illustrating how trade is thriving there as well.

== Languages ==
The languages spoken in Fufore LGA are:

- Fulani
- Gengle
- Koma
- Kugama
- Kumba
- Mboi
- Mumuye
- Verre
- Bata

== Displaced people ==
In 2014, people fleeing violence in Gwoza built a new town in Fufore, at the existing hamlet of Daware (or Damare), off the Yola-Mubi highway. "The condition given for their stay in Daware was that no temporary tents will be erected as the new residents have been allotted both farm and building plots to begin normal life." A school was set up at Damare Camp for the children, with teachers volunteering from the Modibbo Adama University of Technology, Yola, and American University of Nigeria, Yola.

== Districts and Villages ==
- Fufore
- Mayo Inne
- Gurin
- Daware
- Malabu
- Nyibango
- Riba
- Verre
- Beti
- Farang
- Karlani
- Ribadu
- Uki Tuki
- Pariya
- Wuro Bokki
- Yadim
