= Duru languages =

Language subfamily

Duru
- Geographic distribution: northern Cameroon, eastern Nigeria
- Linguistic classification: Niger–Congo?: Atlantic–Congo; Savannas; Leko–Nimbari; Duru
- Subdivisions: Duli; Dii; Voko–Dowayo

Language codes
- Glottolog: samb1323

The Duru languages are a group of Savanna languages spoken in northern Cameroon and eastern Nigeria. They were labeled "G4" in Joseph Greenberg's Adamawa language-family proposal.

Kleinewillinghöfer (2012) also observes many morphological similarities between the Samba-Duru and Central Gur languages.

== Languages ==
- Duli (extinct)
- Dii: Duupa, Dugun (Panõ), Dii (Mambe’, Mamna’a, Goom, Boow, Ngbang, Sagzee, Vaazin, Home, Nyok)
- Peere (Kutin)
- Longto (Voko)
- Vere–Dowayo
  - Dowayo
    - Sewe
  - Koma
  - Vere

However, Guldemann (2018) casts doubt on the coherence of Samba–Duru as a unified group.

== Classification ==
In the Adamawa Languages Project site, Kleinewillinghöfer (2015) classifies the Samba-Duru group as follows (see also Leko languages).

Samba-Duru

- Vere (Verre)
  - Jango (Mom Jango)
  - Vere cluster (Momi, Vere Kaadam)
  - Wɔmmu (Wongi, Wɔŋgi)
  - Nissim-Eilim
  - Kobom, Karum (Vere Kari), Danum
  - Vɔmnəm (Koma Vomni)
  - Gəunəm cluster: Yarəm, Lim, Gbaŋrɨm, Baidəm, Zanəm, Ləələm, etc.
  - Damtəm (Koma Damti), etc.
- Gəmme (Gimme) (Koma)
  - Gəmnəm (Gəmnime, Gimnime): Beiya, Gindoo; Riitime
  - Gəmme (Kompana, Panme): Yəgme, Dehnime; Baanime
- Doyayo (Dooya̰a̰yɔ): Markɛ; Tɛ̰ɛ̰rɛ (of Poli); Tɛ̰ɛ̰rɛ (of the mountains)
- Duru
  - Dii cluster
  - Dugun (Paape, Sa)
  - Duupa (Paape)
  - Pɛrɛ (Pere, Kutin): Gaziwaːlɛ, Nɔlti), ˀAːlti; Zɔŋ Pɛrɛ (Potopo)
  - Lɔŋto (Voko, Woko)
- Samba (Samba Leeko, Leko)
  - Samba cluster
  - Mubaako (Məbaako, Mumbaako, Nyong)
  - Kolbila
  - Pɛrɛma (Wom)

== Names and locations ==
Below is a list of language names, populations, and locations from Blench (2019).

Language	Cluster	Dialects	Alternate spellings	Own name for language	Other names (location-based)	Other names for language	Speakers	Location(s)
Mom Jango				Mom Jango	Vere (see also Momĩ, Were, Verre, Kobo (in Cameroon)		20,000 total (including Momĩ, 4,000 in Cameroon (1982 SIL)	Adamawa State, Fufore LGA
Momi				Ziri	Vere (this also includes Mom Jango, q.v.), Were, Verre, Kobo (in Cameroon)		20,000 total (including Mom Jango), 4,000 in Cameroon (1982 SIL)	Adamawa State, Yola and Fufore LGAs; and in Cameroon
Koma cluster	Koma	The correspondences between the Cameroonian and Nigerian names are uncertain	Kuma, Koma (a Fulfulde cover term for Gomme, Gomnome, Ndera; ALCAM treats them as separate though closely related languages)				3,000 (1982 SIL); majority in Cameroon	Adamawa State, Ganye and Fufore LGAs, in the Alantika Mountains; also in Cameroon
Gomme	Koma		Gәmme			Damti, Koma Kampana, Panbe		
Gomnome	Koma		Gọmnọme			Mbeya, Gimbe, Koma Kadam, Laame, Youtubo		
Ndera	Koma					Vomni, Doome, Doobe		
