= Koma language =

Savanna language of Cameroon

"Koma"
- Region: northern Cameroon and into Nigeria
- Native speakers: (41,000 cited 1982–1989)
- Language family: Niger–Congo?: Atlantic–Congo languages; Volta–Congo languages; Savannas; Adamawa; Leko–Nimbari; Duru; Vere–Dowayo; "Koma"
- Dialects: Gomnome; Gomme; Ndera; Gimme; Gimnime

Language codes
- ISO 639-3: Variously: kmy – Koma Ndera, Gomme kmp – Gɨmme gmn – Gɨmnɨme
- Glottolog: koma1268 Koma Alantika koma1266 Koma Ndera

The Koma language is a language cluster belonging to the Duru branch of Savannas languages of Cameroon. Blench (2004) includes three varieties separated in Ethnologue, Koma Ndera, Gɨmne, and Gɨmnɨme; within Koma Ndera, speakers of the marginal dialects, Gomnome and Ndera, can scarcely understand one another, though both understand the central dialect, Gomme.

== Varieties ==
Blench (2019) lists these language varieties as part of the Koma cluster.

- Gomme (Gәmme) (also known as Damti, Koma Kampana, Panbe)
- Gomnome (Gọmnọme) (also known as Mbeya, Gimbe, Koma Kadam, Laame, Youtubo)
- Ndera (also known as Vomni, Doome, Doobe)

The Ndera, Gimnime, and Kompana language varieties are spoken in the central part of the Alantika Mountains and part of the Faro plains located at the foot of the Alantika Mountains (in the central part of Béka commune, Faro department, Northern Region).

The varieties listed in ALCAM (2012) are as follows, listed from north to south:

- Ndera: spoken to the northwest of Tchamba. Ndera and Kobo (a variety of Vere) are closely related, and are about as closely related to each other as Gimnime and Kompana are to each other. Ndera is not as closely related to Gimnime and Kompana.
- Gimnime (ethnonym: Gimbe): spoken around Wangay, divided between the Gimbe of the mountains to the west of Tchamba. There are about 3,000 Gimnime speakers in the Northern Region, in Faro department (in Béka commune, around Wangay). Their language is closer to Kompana than to Koma (Koma Ndera). It is also found in Nigeria.
- Ritibe: spoken in the plain to the southwest of Tchamba. The Gimbe and Ritibe are ethnically distinct from each other and do not have the same customs.
- Kompana: more confined to the massif and only extending onto the plain at Saptou. There are about 3,000 Kompana speakers in Béka commune, Faro department. They use Fulfulde as a second language. Kompana (Koma Kompana) or Gimma is more closely related to Koma (Koma Ndera) and Gimnime (Koma Kadam). Kompana is also spoken in Nigeria.

Although they are also referred to by the local government as Koma Ndera, Koma Kadam, and Koma Kompana, the term Koma itself is not used by any of these groups.

== Name ==
The name Koma Ndera is used by the Fulbe and the local Cameroonian government. Ndera is derived from the name of a village. Also, the terms Doabe (ethnonym; name referring to the ethnic group) and Doome (glossonym; name referring to the language) are used by the neighboring Gimbe, including the Kobo, who speak a language closely related to Koma Ndera. Léélu, Bangru, Zanu, Liu, and Yéru are the ethnonyms (plural forms) corresponding respectively to the villages Ndera, Mougini, Boge, Li, and Gede. Koma Ndera is found in Faro department, Northern Region (northwest of the Chamba Leko area) and is also spoken in Nigeria.
