= Nyong language =

Leko language spoken in Cameroon and Nigeria

Nyong
- Mumbake
- Nyɔŋ Nyanga
- Native to: Nigeria, Cameroon
- Region: Adamawa State
- Native speakers: 30,000 in Cameroon (2008 census)
- Language family: Niger–Congo?: Atlantic–Congo; Leko–Nimbari; Leko; Nyong

Language codes
- ISO 639-3: muo
- Glottolog: nyon1241

- Person: Nyɔŋvena
- People: Nyɔŋnepa (Nyongnepa)
- Language: Nyɔŋ Nyanga

Nyong (Daganyonga), also known as Mubako and Bali-Kumbat, is a Leko language spoken in two well-separated enclaves in Cameroon and Nigeria. Cameroonian speakers consider themselves to be ethnically Chamba.

Nyong is linguistically distinct from nearby languages. It is instead more similar to the Chamba language which is spoken to the north. Nyong and Chamba have 85% lexical similarity.

== Distribution ==
Ethnologue (22nd ed.) lists the following Nyong villages and locations.

- Cameroon
  - Mezam division, Santa subdivision: Baligham village
  - Ngo-Ketunjia division, Balikumbat subdivision: Baligashu, Baligansin, and Balikumbat villages on Ndop plain
- Nigeria
  - Adamawa State: Mayo Belwa LGA
  - Taraba State: Zing LGA. 6 villages.

== Phonology ==
The vowels of Nyong are /i/, /u/, /e/, /o/, /ə/ /ɛ/, /ɔ/, and /a/. Length contrast exists in all vowels except /ə/ and /o/, which are always short. There are five tones: high, mid, low, rising, and falling.

Consonant Phonemes
	Labial	Dental/Alveolar	Palatal	Velar	Labiovelar	Glottal
Nasal	m	n	ɲ	ŋ		
Stop	p, b	t, d		k, g		
Affricate		nd		ŋɡ	kp, gb	
Approximant		l	j		w	
Fricative	f, v	s, z				h
