= Chamba people =

Ethnic group in West-Central Africa

Chamba
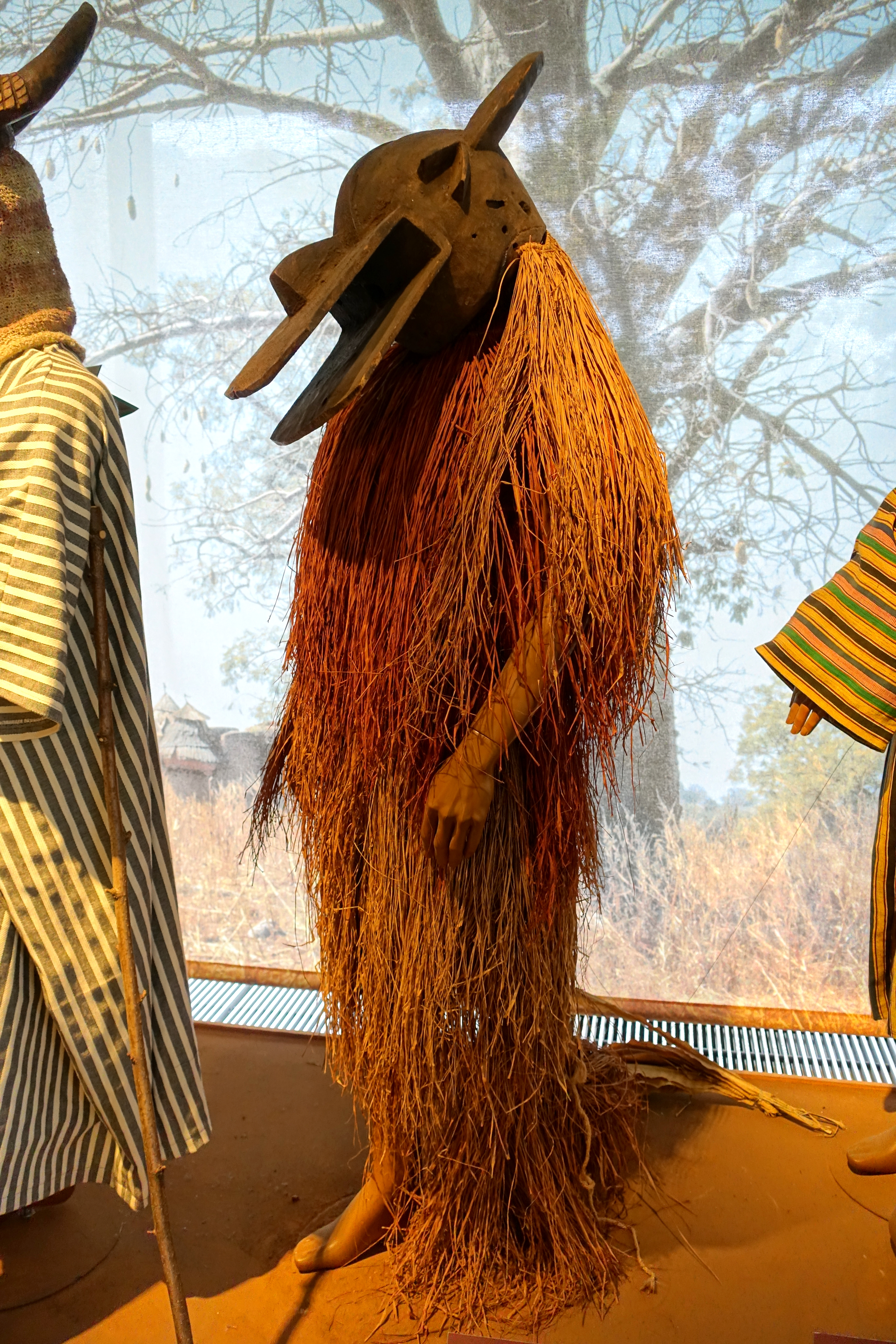
- Buffalo mask of the Chamba people

Regions with significant populations
- Nigeria; Cameroon

Languages
- Chamba Leko; Chamba Daka

Related ethnic groups
- Tiv people; Mambila people; Boki people; Efik people

The Chamba are a significant Bantoid ethnic group in western Cameroon and north eastern Nigeria. The Chamba are located between present day Nigeria and Cameroon. They together with the Tiv people, the Mambila people and the Efik people are the most populous Bantoid peoples in Nigeria. In Cameroon, the successors of Leko and chamba speakers are divided into several states: Bali Nyonga, Bali Kumbat, Bali-Gham, Bali-Gangsin, and Bali-Gashu. There are two ethnic groups in Ghana and Togo also called Chamba, but they are ethnically distinct. The Chamba are identified through their own language, beliefs, culture, and art.

== Language ==
The Chamba people, also known as Samba, Tchamba, Tsamba, Daka and Chamba-Ndagan, are an ethnic group found in the Adamawa State of North-East Nigeria and neighboring parts of north Cameroon. They speak two distantly related languages: Chamba Leko, of the Leko–Nimbari languages, and Chamba Daka, of the Dakoid languages, both of which are Northern Bantoid languages.

Chamba Leko speakers are restricted to the easternmost part of the central area, for the most part on the Cameroon part of the modern border. The remainder of the Chamba are Daka-speaking”. The Chamba speakers still speak various other dialects that are different from place to place. The central area is where the Chamba Daka (Sama Nnakenyare) live. That area is found in North east of Nigeria on the Cameroon border in Adamawa State.

Germany was the original colonial power that annexed the Chambaland, but when Germany lost the First World War, this territory in Africa was divided by the League of Nations between Britain and France.

== Beliefs ==
The Chamba people have their own particular religious beliefs. The traditional religion of the Chamba is premised on a creator solar God (Su) and ancestor spirits who live with this creator. The sun god does not interact with living beings, but the ancestor spirits do. The dead (wurumbu) are believed to continue living, but they live below the ground. They follow the same style and sophistication as humans, but they are believed to be wiser and with supernatural power. Special people among the Chamba are believed to be able to interact with these ancestral spirits and they are revered by the Chamba people.

The Chamba people were one of the targets of Fulani jihads in the 18th and 19th century. They were enslaved, and many migrated south into the mountains. They retaliated by becoming raiding bands who attacked slave and trading caravans. A minority, or about 15%, of the Chamba people adhere to Islam.

== Society and Culture ==
The Chamba traditionally live in grassland areas, farming cereal staples, and cash crops such as cocoa and coffee. One main crop that the Chamba farm is guinea corn. The Chamba are composed of different clans that can have varying styles of chiefdoms. Some are led by women, men, or both. These clans work based on the collective belief in "the authoritative masculinity of relatively older men and women."

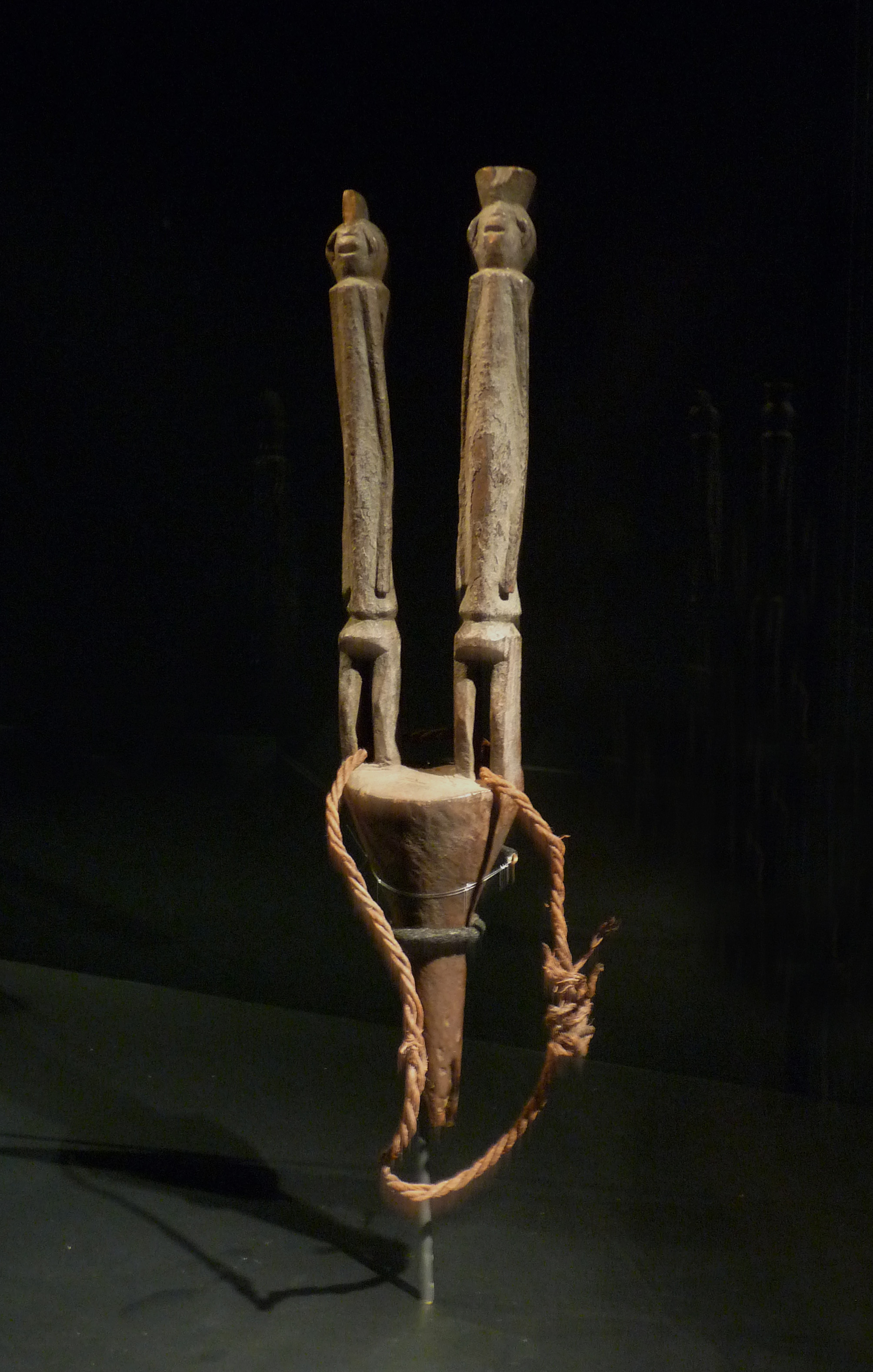
A double figure columnar wooden statue.

The Chamba live in villages. Outside of the villages is an uninhabited forest region called the bush. The areas of the bush closest to the village are places that the Chamba collect materials for building fires, making utilitarian objects like baskets and mats, hunting, and gathering. These areas of the bush are accessed both by men and women. The inner bush is considered more dangerous and associated with the male gender.

=== Cults ===
One form of Chamba social control is through the use of cults. Chamba Daka refer to cults as jup. Each jup is connected with misfortune or disease. These cults can control these misfortunes and cure diseases based on how the members perform rituals and make payments. Each jup is individualized and runs uniquely based on their own rules and practices. There are both men's and women's cults that an individual may only gain membership through an initiation process. Cult members are expected to keep the rituals, rites, and practices secret. Membership in cults can provide protection and security from misfortunes and illnesses.

Initiation processes are different for each gender's cult. Circumcision is a part of the men's cult initiation, through which the process allows boys to enter into manhood. For women, their marker of transition into womanhood is not through initiation but marriage. Often, women do not join cults until they are married. For women's cults, sometimes tooth evulsion is part of initiation. However, tooth evulsion is less practiced now and varies by region and particular group.

=== Art ===
They are skilled artists known for their pottery, metalwork and sculpture. In addition, the Chamba make masks that are performed at special occasions.

==== Masking Tradition ====
Masks representing the wild are typically composed of a wooden mask and a costume made of long fibers. The complete look is supposed to give the illusion of one complete entity with the mask, costume, and performer becoming a single unit.

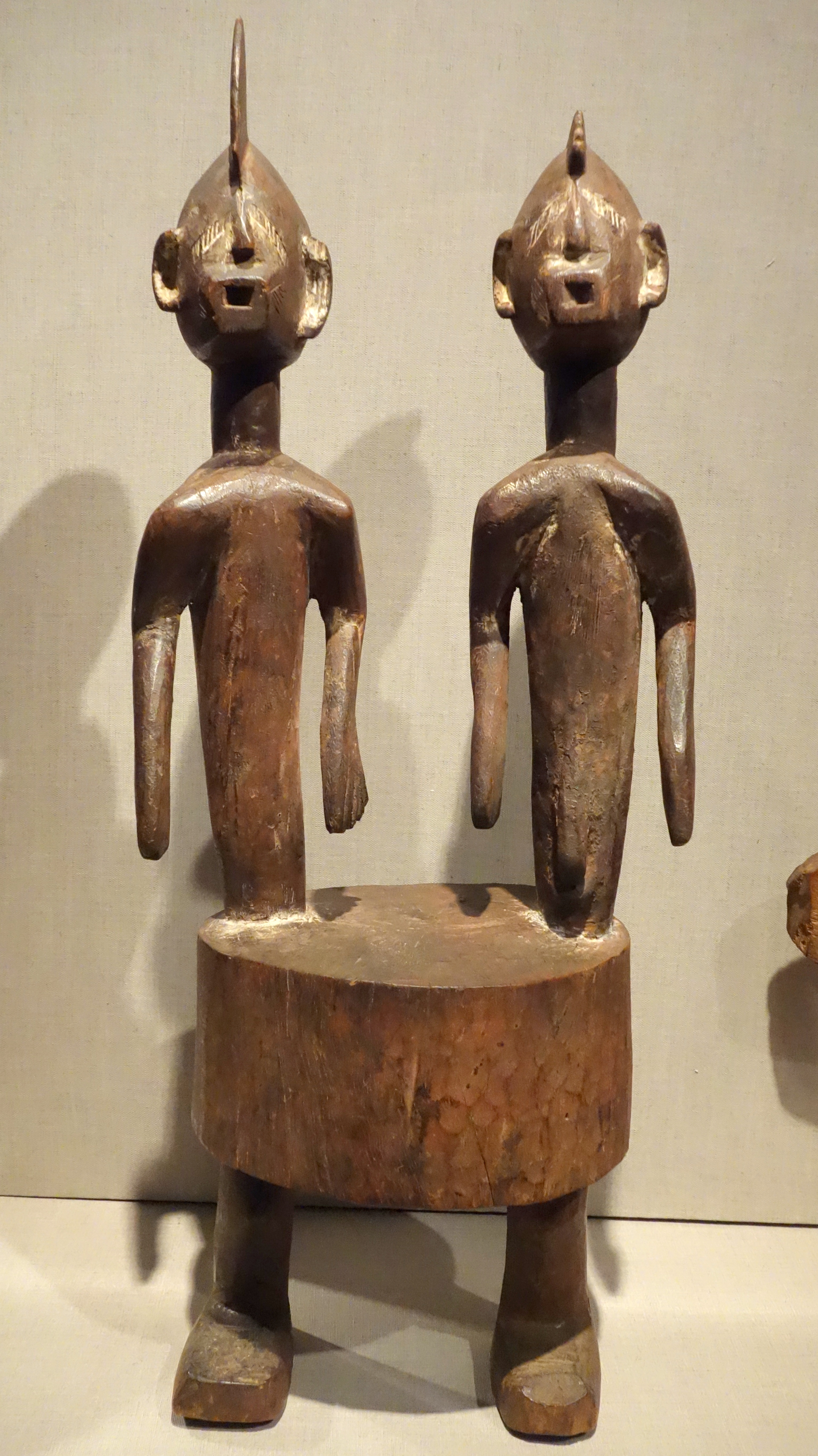
A double figure volumetric wooden statue.

One specific type of mask is called a buffalo or bush cow mask. Each clan of the Chamba usually has at least one bush cow mask. These masks are painted different colors to determine whether the mask is male or female. Some clans will have both a female and male bush cow mask. The features of the mask are composed of both animal and human attributes. The horns of the bush cow mask refer to the "female bush cow ancestor." The mouth is often compared to that of a crocodile. These masks are supposed to represent the power of the bush. The masks function in conjunction with Chamba events like circumcision, initiation of chiefs, and funerals. These masks are stored in the bush. When they perform for special occasions, the masks leave the bush and enter into the village. During performances, the masquerader will dance. Some liken the style of dance to that of a buffalo charging.

==== Statues ====
Chamba statues are figural, usually depicting a male, a female, or both a male and female. The figures usually appear in a single form or a double form in which two figures are attached to a base. These statues are typically made of wood or iron. These statues have been divided into two categories based on their visual form. The first group is characterized by its volume. These statues often carved from a single piece of wood. The arms have bent arms and crouching legs. The arms come away from the body. One interpretation of these poses is that the figures may be dancing. In volumetric double form statues, two upper bodies share one pair of legs. The second group is characterized by its column-like form. The figure's arms and legs are attached to the body.

Some of these statues were thought to be used in cult rituals. The function of these statues is widely unknown. The little records of what the function may be have come from a few ethnologists during the colonial-period.

== Notable people ==
- Gen. T Theophilus Y. Danjuma
- Mallam Musa Hassan El-wakil Dakka..
