= Kwamoti Laori =

Nigerian politician (born 1966)

Kwamoti Bitrus Laori

Member of House of Representatives
- In office 2015–Incumbent
- Constituency: Demsa/Numan/Lamurde Federal Constituency

Personal details
- Born: 17 October 1966 (age 59)
- Party: Peoples Democratic Party
- Occupation: Politician

Kwamoti Bitrus Laori (born 17 October 1966) is a Nigerian politician. He is currently serving as a member representing Demsa/Numan/Lamurde Federal Constituency in the House of Representatives.

== Early life and political career ==
Kwamoti Laori hails from Imburu, Numan Adamawa State and holds a bachelor’s degree in law. He succeeded Anthony Madwatte and was elected to the National Assembly in 2015. However,his election was voided by the Election Tribunal and the Court of Appeal. Hon. Talatu Yakubu of APC was declared winner and replaced Kwamoti Laori in the House of Representatives. Laori was again elected in 2019 and 2023, securing a second term with the Peoples Democratic Party (PDP).
