= Kolbila language =

Language of Cameroon and Nigeria

Kolbila
- Kolbilla
- Native to: Cameroon
- Region: Adamawa Region
- Native speakers: 4,500 (2018)
- Language family: Niger–Congo?: Atlantic–Congo; Leko–Nimbari; Leko; Kolbila
- Writing system: Latin

Language codes
- ISO 639-3: klc
- Glottolog: kolb1240
- ELP: Kolbila

Kolbila is an Adamawa language used in Cameroon and Nigeria.

== Distribution ==
Kolbila is closely related to Samba Leko. It is spoken by fewer than 4,000 speakers in several settlements along the Ngaoundéré-Garoua road in Bantanjé (Bantadje) canton of northwest Cameroon (Sabine Littig 2017). There were three major waves of settlement in these locations:

- Demsa (in 1954)
- Mayo Boki (in 1972)
- Mbé (in 1976)

According to ALCAM (2012), Kolbila is spoken near Faro National Park at Demsa', located about 20 kilometers north of the town of Mbe along the Ngairi-Garoua road in Demsa commune. Kolbila was originally spoken in Bantadjé of Poli commune, Bénoué department, North Region. It is separated from the Samba Leko area by Longto. It is part of the "Pape" group of languages according to linguist Lars Lode.
