= Kpasam language =

Yendang language spoken in Nigeria

Kpasam
- Nyesam
- Native to: Nigeria
- Region: Adamawa state
- Native speakers: (undated figure of 3,000)
- Language family: Niger–Congo?: Atlantic–Congo; Leko–Nimbari; Mumuye–Yendang; Yendang; Kpasam

Language codes
- ISO 639-3: pbn
- Glottolog: kpas1242

Sàm
- People: ísàm
- Language: ɲé sàm
- Country: ásàm

Kpasam (Kpasham; Nyesam) is an Adamawa language of Demsa LGA, Adamawa State, Nigeria.

The speakers refer to their language as Nyesam [ɲé sàm], their ethnic group as Isam [ísàm], and their territory as Asam [ásàm]. The Nyesam language is spoken in the villages of Kpasham, Dakli, and Dem.
