= Pangseng language =

Adamawa language of Nigeria

Pangseng
- Native to: Nigeria
- Region: Taraba State
- Language family: Niger–Congo?: Atlantic–Congo; Leko–Nimbari; Mumuye–Yendang; Mumuye; Pangseng

Language codes
- ISO 639-3: pgs
- Glottolog: pang1286

Pangseng is an Adamawa language of Taraba State, Nigeria. It is spoken in Jinlàri (Jimleri), located on the Zing-Lankaviri road. Varieties include Komo, Jega, and others.
