= Voko language =

Atlantic–Congo language spoken in Cameroon

Longto
- Voko
- Region: Cameroon
- Native speakers: (2,400 cited 1982)
- Language family: Niger–Congo?: Atlantic–Congo; Leko–Nimbari; Duru; Longto

Language codes
- ISO 639-3: wok
- Glottolog: long1387

- People: Lɔŋmó or Lõmó
- Language: Lɔ̀ŋtó or Lõtó

Longto (Lɔ̀ŋtó, Lõtó), or Voko (Woko), is a member of the Duru branch of Savanna languages that is spoken in Poli Subdivision of Faro Department, Cameroon.

== Names ==
Speakers call themselves Lɔŋmó or Lõmó, and their language Lɔ̀ŋtó or Lõtó. Voko is an exonym. They call their village Gormaya, although outsiders refer to the village as Voko. Fulfulde is the local lingua franca.

== Villages ==
Lontô is spoken by 2,400 speakers around Voko in the massifs and plains located southwest of Poli (next to Faro National Park) in Poli commune, Faro department, Northern Region.

14 villages that are exclusively ethnic Longmo are Gormaya (Voko), Ouro-Kila, Delengui, Ndougouri, Longote, Paté-Petel, Paté-Manga, Ouro-Kessoum, Lenguerba, Mayo-Djarendi, Taroua, Meta-Diam, and Ngoutiri. Villages with both Longmo and Dooyaayo people are Ouro-Mbay, Salaki, and Guito.
