= Doyayo language =

Duru language spoken in Cameroon

Doyayo
- Dowayo
- Region: Cameroon
- Native speakers: (15,000 cited 1994)
- Language family: Niger–Congo?: Atlantic–Congo; Leko–Nimbari; Duru; Vere–Dowayo; Doyayo
- Dialects: Sewe

Language codes
- ISO 639-3: dow
- Glottolog: doya1240

- Person: Doowaayɔ
- Language: Dooya̰a̰yɔ

Doyayo (ethnonym: Dowayo) is a language of the Duru branch of Adamawa languages spoken in Cameroon.

Doyayo (Dooya̰a̰yɔ 'man's mouth'; alternatively Doowaaya̰a̰yɔ 'man's child's mouth') is spoken by the Dowayo (or Doowaayɔ 'man's child') ethnic group.

== Names ==
According to ALCAM (2012), Doayo, which has 18,000 speakers, is the main language of the northern part of Poli commune (in Faro department, Northern Region).

Taara is spoken in the mountains west of Poli, and Marka in the plains further northwest in Tcheboa commune, Bénoué department.

The term Namchi, which means "crushed ones" or "those who crush [millet for us]" in Fulfulde, is a cover term that refers not only to the Doayo, but also its neighbors Duupa and Dugun (the latter two are both Dii languages).

Joseph Greenberg's "Sewe" is in fact a variety of the Doayo language documented by Griaule. The name comes from the informant's village, Sewe.

== Dialects ==
Doyayo dialects are:

- Markɛ (spoken in the northwestern plains)
- Tɛ̰ɛ̰rɛ of Poli
- Southern Tɛ̰ɛ̰rɛ (spoken in the mountains to the south)
- Sewe (Séwé)

(Note that there are two distinct Tɛ̰ɛ̰rɛ dialects.)

Blench (2004) considers the Sewe dialect to be a separate language, no more closely related to Dowayo than to Koma and Vere.
