= Ndong =

Ndong or N'Dong may refer to:

- José Ndong Machín Dicombo (born 1996), also known as Pepín, Equatoguinean professional footballer
- Pablo Ndong Esi (1969–2010), better known as Boyas, Equatoguinean football goalkeeper and manager
- Aminata Ndong (born 1980), Senegalese former fencer
- Avelina Ndong (born 2003), Equatorial Guinean footballer
- Basilio Ndong (born 1999), Equatoguinean professional footballer
- Benjamín Ndong (born 1999), Equatoguinean footballer
- Boniface Ndong (born 1977), Senegalese retired basketball player and current coach
- Didier Ndong (born 1994), Gabonese professional footballer
- Emiliana Nchama Ndong (born 1986), Equatorial Guinean footballer
- Emmanuel Ndong (born 1992), Gabonese professional footballer
- Henri Junior Ndong (born 1992), Gabonese professional footballer
- Jean Eyeghé Ndong (born 1946), Gabonese politician
- Juan Ecomo Ndong, Equatoguinean political activist currently imprisoned on weapons possession charges
- Laurence Ndong (born 1971), Gabonese politician
- Ousmane Ndong (born 1999), Senegalese professional footballer
- Parfait Ndong (born 1971), Gabonese former professional footballer
- Patrick Nguema Ndong (1957–2021), French-Gabonese journalist on Gabon's Africa N°1 radio station
- Reginaldo Ndong (born 1986), Equatoguinean track and field sprint athlete
- Sang Ndong, Gambian football manager and former player
- Steeve Nguema Ndong (1971–2009), Gabonese judoka
- Ulysse Ndong (born 1992), French-born Gabonese professional footballer
- Jean-Daniel Ndong Nzé (born 1970), Gabonese footballer
- Raymond Ndong Sima (born 1955), Gabonese politician who was Prime Minister of Gabon from February 2012 to January 2014

== See also ==
- Ndong Awing Cultural & Development Association, created 1962 to develop the Awing village and Fondom in the Northwest Region of Cameroon
- Nedong (disambiguation)
