= Talatu Yohanna =

Member of Nigerian House of Representatives

Hon. Talatu Yohanna

Member House of Representatives
- In office June 2015 – June 2019
- Constituency: Demsa/Numan/Lamurde Federal Constituency, Adamawa State.

Personal details
- Born: November 11, 1973 (age 52)
- Party: APC

Talatu Yohanna (born November 11, 1973) is an administrator and politician. She was a member of the Nigerian House of Representatives where she represented Demsa/Numan/Lamurde Federal Constituency in Adamawa State.

== Early life ==
Talatu Yohanna was born on November 11, 1973,. She is a native of the Ngodogoron community in Adamawa State, Nigeria's Lamnurde Local Government Area. She is a politician and an administrator. She serves as a member of the House of Representatives, representing Adamawa State's Demss/Numan/Lamurde Federal Constituency.

== Career ==
Yohanna started working as an administrator in public business, and later moved into politics where she has served as a women's leader, supervisory councilor, special assistant and special adviser to the Governor of Adamawa State. She has also served as a Commissioner for Trade and Cooperative in Adamawa State. She was a member of the House of Representatives where she represents Demsa/Numan/Lamurde Federal Constituency, Adamawa State under the All Progressives Congress. She was preceded by Kwamoti Laori a PDP candidate as the member representing Demsa/Numan/Lamurde Federal Constituency, Adamawa State. She also serves in the House Committee on Women Parliament.

== Personal life ==
Yohanna is married and with children. She is an indigene of Ngodogoron community in Lamurde Local Government Area of Adamawa State.
