= Teme language =

Adamawa language of Nigeria

Teme
- Native to: Nigeria
- Region: Adamawa state
- Native speakers: (4,000 cited 1995)
- Language family: Niger–Congo?: Atlantic–Congo; Leko–Nimbari; Mumuye–Yendang; Yendang?; Teme

Language codes
- ISO 639-3: tdo
- Glottolog: teme1252

Teme is an Adamawa language of Nigeria.
