= Rang language =

Language of Nigeria

Rang
- Native to: Nigeria
- Region: Taraba State
- Language family: Niger–Congo?: Atlantic–Congo; Leko–Nimbari; Mumuye–Yendang; Mumuye; Rang

Language codes
- ISO 639-3: rax
- Glottolog: rang1269

Rang (Lamma) is a clan of Mumuye tribe In Lamma ward Zing local government area of Taraba State, Nigeria. It is spoken in and around Lamma, and in Zanto Lamma or Zori, Besagba, Koyu, and Jauro Nasaraawo Jereng. Rang is the first clan to settled in Lamma
