= Koma people =

Koma
Total population
- 55,000

Regions with significant populations
- Adamawa State, Ganye and Fufore LGAs, Koma Vomni, Atlantika Mountains
- Nigeria, West and Central Africa: 49,000

Languages
- Koma (kmy)

Religion
- Christian (30%), Ethnic Religions (70%)

Koma is a hill-dwelling ethnic group in northern Adamawa, in the Atlantika Mountains, which shares a border with southern Cameroun. Hill-dwellers are spread through the south and southwest of these mountains, including many on the Cameroun side. There are 21 Koma villages in the Cameroonian side of the Alantika Mountains and 17 villages on the Nigerian side.

The largest towns in the Koma area are: Tantille, Chonha, Mani, Nassaraw Koma and Ba-Usmanu.

== History ==
The Koma people became recognized as Nigerians in 1961, a year after independence, along with the old provinces of Cameroun. Today Koma is part of the seven districts of Jada local government in Adamawa State.

== Description ==
The Koma have their own language, known as Koma, with an estimated 61,000 speakers. It is a member of the Niger–Congo family. The Koma people are divided into three main groups: the hill-dwelling Beya and Ndamti, and the Vomni and Verre lowlanders.
