= Akule =

Akule may refer to:

- Akule, a dialect of the Yendang language
- Akule, the Hawaiian name for Bigeye scad
