= Bwatiye people =

Nigerian Tribe

The Bwatiye people refer to the Bachama and Bata which are a set of people that can be found in Numan, Demsa, Girei, Fufore and Lamurde Local Governments of Adamawa State and in some part of the Cameroons Republic.

== History ==
The Bwatiye people origin can be traced back to the Gobir people. According to history, Gobir people who occupied Niger territory and some Northwestern Nigeria. They were powerful and brave due to their mastery and skills in battle and artwork. However, they were over powered by the Tuaregs and were forced to move down to south which is now called the northeastern Nigeria. Also, persistence war from Bornu people forced them to their present location, Adamawa State.

== Language ==
Bwatiye people speak Bachama language.

== Festivals ==
=== Kwete annual cultural festival ===
It is a seven days spiritual-cultural festival that is done to honour their vegetarian god (Homonpwa ka Puledan) for the bounty of agricultural produces.

=== Vayato Gyawana Festival of Bwatiye people ===
It is a wrestling festival and annual harvest thanksgiving mostly take place june/july.

=== Vunon Festival ===
It is popularly known as Farai-Farai. It is a four-days festival that tends to unite Demsa, Mbula, Numan and Lamurde in worshipping their common deities and to also declare farming activities open. It is one of the biggest festival of the Bwatiye people that involved singing, dancing and displaying of numerous ornaments.

== Traditional Governance ==
The Bwatiye people used monarchy system of government and the title given to their rulers is the “Hama” .The Bwatiye people are ruled by their two distinguished kings; The Hama Bachama and the Hama Bata, with palaces in Numan and Demsa respectively.The current Hama Bachama is DanieI Shaga Ismaila.The current Hama Bata is Alhamdu Gladson Teneke
