= Bafanji, Balikumbat =

Bafanji
- Location within Cameroon
- Coordinates: 5°50′10″N 10°24′00″E
- Country: Cameroon
- Region: Northwest
- Department: Ngo-Ketunjia
- Elevation: 1,138 m (3,734 ft)

Population (2005 census)
  - Total: 17,890
- Time zone: UTC+1 (WAT)

Bafanji is one of the five villages of Balikumbat subdivision and one of the thirteen villages of Ngo-Ketunjia department in Cameroon. Bafanji is one of five Mangeh villages without a defined boundary.

== See also ==
- Communes of Cameroon

== History ==
Mangeh villagers believe that Mangeh had five children, two sons (Tuningmungwa and Chengfong) and three daughters (Byiae, Vhenji and Mekheng). The eldest Tunigmungwa succeeded their father and formed Bambalang while his brother Chengfong established the Bamunka village and Byiae formed Bamali, Vhenji formed Bafanji and Mekheng the Bamunkumbit village.

Bambalang and Bamunka were descendants of the males (sons of Mangeh) while Bafanji, Bamunkumbit and Bamali were the descendants of the daughters. These five villages formed the Mangeh Family Association to maintain peace and unity among themselves. Mangeh branches are found all over the country and abroad.
