= Ndong Awing =

Business

Ndong Awing, or Ndong Awing Cultural & Development Association, is an association created on 23 December 1962 for the purpose of furthering the development of the Awing village and Fondom in the Northwest Region of Cameroon.

== Geographical location ==
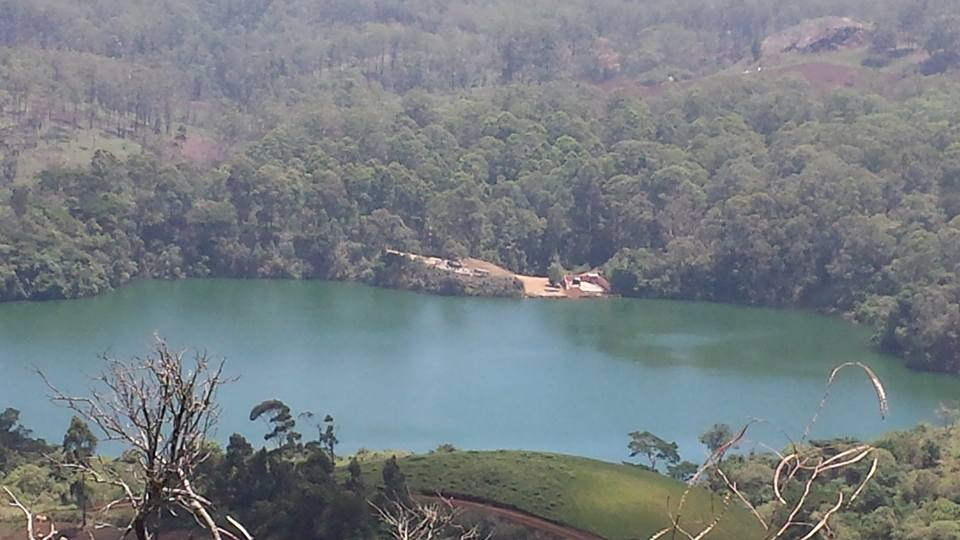
Lake Awing

The village of Awing is located about 21 km (13 mi) south of the town of Bamenda. The area between longitudes 10°10′E and 10°22′E and latitudes 5°49′N and 6°00′N comprises the Fondom of Awing. To the northwest of Awing is what used to be the Bafut-Ngemba Native Authority Forest Reserve (today called Government Forest Reserve), Lake Awing (a crater lake and shrine), Mount Lefo (which is the fourth highest mountain in the country at 2,550 m or 8,370 ft) and Akum. In the north, Awing shares boundaries with Mendankwe, Bambili, and Babanki Tungoh. Awing borders Balikumbat to the northeast, Bamukumbit to the east, Bamenyam and Baligham (also called Bali-Bagam) to the south, and Njong to the west.
