= Daniel Shaga Ismaila =

28th ruler of the Bwatiye people

- Born: Daniel Shaga Ismaila; 23 February 1954 (age 72); Bauchi, Bauchi State, Nigeria
- Education: University of Maiduguri, University of Jos
- Occupation: Accountant

Daniel Shaga Ismaila is the 29th paramount ruler of the Bwatiye people as approved by the Governor of Adamawa State Ahmadu Umaru Fintiri on 29 July 2020. He is a certified accountant and former Assistant Commander-General of Narcotics (ACGN) of the National Drug Law Enforcement Agency.

== Biography ==
Daniel Shaga Ismaila hails from Lamurde, the headquarters of the Bwatiye people, the spiritual home and traditional headquarters of the Bachama people of Adamawa State. He was born on 23 February 1954 in Northeastern city of Bauchi, Bauchi State. He is an accountant and worked in several firms before he joined the National Drugs Law and Enforcement Agency in 1994 where he retired as an Assistant Commander-General of Narcotics in 2014.

=== Education ===
Daniel Shaga Ismaila obtained a Bachelor of Science (Honours) in Accounting from University of Maiduguri in 1982. He later obtained a Masters in Business Administration (MBA) from the University of Jos in 1992.

== Hama Bachama ==
A month after the death of the 28th ruler of the Bwatiye people, Homun Honest Irmiya Stephen, on 28 June 2020, the kingmakers selected Ismaila as the new Hama Bachama and he was endorsed by the Government and the Bwatiye people on 29 July 2020.
