= Talatu =

Nigerian given name

- Gender: Female
- Language: Chadic languages, ultimately from Arabic

Origin
- Origin: Nigerian
- Meaning: Tuesday
- Region of origin: Northern Nigeria

Talatu // is a Nigerian female given name predominantly used among Muslims. It is derived from Arabic (يوم الثلاثاء), Talata lending itself to the word for "Tuesday" in the Chadic languages (e.g., Hausa, Kanuri). Thus, it is given to Tuesday-born girls.

== Notable individuals with the name ==
- Talatu Yohanna (born 1973), Nigerian politician.
