= GEG (disambiguation) =

GEG is the IATA code (and FAA LID) for Spokane International Airport, Washington, United States.

GEG may also refer to:

- Galaxy Entertainment Group, a hotel and casion company operator in Macau
- Gelehrte Estnische Gesellschaft, an Estonian learned society
- Kugama language (ISO 639-3:geg), spoken in Nigeria
