= Yoti language =

Savanna language spoken in Nigeria

Yoti
- Native to: Nigeria
- Region: Taraba State
- Native speakers: 3,000 (2011)
- Language family: Niger–Congo?: Atlantic–Congo; Leko–Nimbari; Mumuye–Yendang; Yendang; Yoti

Language codes
- ISO 639-3: yot
- Glottolog: yott1234

Yoti (Yotti) is a member of the Leko–Nimbari group of Savanna languages, spoken in northeastern Nigeria.
