= Waka language =

Adamawa language of Nigeria

Waka
- Native to: Nigeria
- Region: Taraba state
- Native speakers: (5,000 cited 1992)
- Language family: Niger–Congo?: Atlantic–Congo; Volta-Congo; Savannas; Adamawa–Ubangi; Adamawa; Leko–Nimbari; Mumuye–Yendang; Yendang; Waka

Language codes
- ISO 639-3: wav
- Glottolog: waka1275

Waka is an Adamawa language of Nigeria.
