= Leko language =

Leko language may refer to:

- the Leco language
- one of the Leko languages
