= Yendang languages =

Adamawa language group of Nigeria

Yendang
- Maya
- Geographic distribution: Adamawa State, eastern Nigeria
- Linguistic classification: Niger–Congo?: Atlantic–Congo; Savannas; Leko–Nimbari; Mumuye–Yendang; Yendang

Language codes
- Glottolog: yand1260

The Yendang or Maya languages are a group of Adamawa languages spoken in Adamawa State, eastern Nigeria.

== Languages ==
The classification below follows Blench (2009).

- Maya (Yendang)
  - Bali, Kpasham
  - Waka, Yendang (incl. Kusheki), Yoti
  - Teme
  - Gengle, Kugama, Kumba (Sate, Yofo)

== Names and locations ==
Below is a list of language names, populations, and locations from Blench (2019).

Language	Branch	Cluster	Dialects	Alternate spellings	Own name for language	Endonym(s)	Other names (location-based)	Other names for language	Exonym(s)	Speakers	Location(s)	Notes
Mumuye cluster	Mumuye	Mumuye								103,000 (1952); 400,000 (1980 UBS)	Taraba State, Jalingo, Zing, Yorro and Mayo Belwa LGAs	
Bali	Yendang				Ị̀báalí	Ɓalo, Máyá				1,000 (SIL)	Taraba State, Numan LGA, at Bali, a single village south of Jalingo	
Kpasam	Yendang			Passam, Kpasham				Nyisam			Adamawa State, Numan LGA, one village only, south of Jalingo	
Yendang	Yendang			Yendam, Yandang, Yundum, Nyandang						8,100 (1952); 10,000 (1973 SIL)	Adamawa State, Numan, Mayo Belwa, and Karim Lamido LGAs	
Yoti	Yendang			Yoti							Adamawa State, Numan LGA	
Kugama-Gengle	Yendang			Kugamma, Gengle			Wegam	Wegele		Small	Adamawa State, Fufore LGA	no data
Teme	Yendang			Temme							Adamawa State, Mayo Belwa and Fufore LGAs	no data
Waka	Yendang										Adamawa State, Fufore, Mayo Belwa LGAs	no data
Kumba	Yendang						Sate, Yofo				Adamawa State, Mayo Belwa LGA	no data

== See also ==
- Yendang word lists (Wiktionary)
