= Mumuye languages =

A group of languages spoken in Nigeria.

Mumuye
- Geographic distribution: Taraba State, eastern Nigeria
- Linguistic classification: Niger–Congo?: Atlantic–Congo; Savannas; Leko–Nimbari; Mumuye–Yendang; Mumuye

Language codes
- Glottolog: mumu1250

The Mumuye languages are a group of Adamawa languages spoken in Taraba State, eastern Nigeria.

== Languages ==
The classification below follows Shimizu (1979).

- Mumuye
  - Mumuye proper: Northeast Mumuye, Southwest Mumuye
  - Rang Mumuye: Rang
  - Pangseng Mumuye: Pangseng, Komo, Jega, etc.

Mumuye is the most widely spoken Adamawa language.

== Names and locations ==
Below is a list of language names, populations, and locations from Blench (2019).

Language	Branch	Cluster	Dialects	Alternate spellings	Own name for language	Endonym(s)	Other names (location-based)	Other names for language	Exonym(s)	Speakers	Location(s)	Notes
Mumuye cluster	Mumuye	Mumuye								103,000 (1952); 400,000 (1980 UBS)	Taraba State, Jalingo, Zing, Yorro and Mayo Belwa LGAs	
North–Eastern Mumuye	Mumuye	Mumuye	Bajama (Gnoore) and Jeng, Zing (Zinna, Zeng) and Mang, Kwaji and Meeka, Yaa, also Yakoko (according to Meek)	Zing group							Taraba State, Zing, Yorro and Mayo Belwa LGAs	
South–Western Mumuye	Mumuye	Mumuye	Monkin group: Kugong, Shaari, Sagbee; Kpugbong group: Kasaa, Yɔrɔ, Lankoviri (Lankavirĩ), Saawa, Nyaaja, and Jaalingo								Taraba State, Jalingo LGA	
Pangseng	Mumuye		Pangseng, Komo, Jega								Taraba State, Karim Lamido LGA	
Rang	Mumuye										Taraba State, Zing LGA	

== See also ==
- Proto-Mumuye reconstructions (Wiktionary)
