= Dii languages =

Dialect cluster of Cameroon

Dii
- Duru
- Region: Cameroon
- Native speakers: (60,000 cited 1982–1997)
- Language family: Niger–Congo?: Atlantic–Congo; Leko–Nimbari; Duru; Dii languages; Dii
- Dialects: Mambe’ Mamna’a; Goom; Boow; Ngbang; Phaane; Sagzee; Vaazin; Home; Nyok; Duupa; Dugun (Panõ)

Language codes
- ISO 639-3: Variously: dur – Dii dae – Duupa ndu – Dugun
- Glottolog: diic1235

The Dii language is a dialect cluster in the Duru branch of Savanna languages. Yag Dii is the ethnonym.

Ethnologue lists Mambe’, Mamna’a, Goom, Boow, Ngbang, Sagzee, Vaazin, Home, Nyok as dialects, and notes that Goom may be a separate language. Blench (2004) lists them all, as well as Phaane, as separate languages, no closer to each other than they are to the other Dii languages, Duupa, Dugun (Panõ).

== Varieties ==
The Duupa (5,000 speakers) used to live in the Hosséré Vokré mountains to the east of Poli (in Poli commune, Faro department, North Region). Today, the vast majority have descended from the mountains and now live in the Lobi River plains (around the junction where the Ngaoundéré-Garoua road passes) and in Poli.

The Dugun, also called Pa'no (7,000 speakers (Lars Lode 1997)), live southeast of Poli in the North Region (in Poli commune, Faro commune, and Lagdo commune in Bénoué department). The Dugun live in the plains, and the Saa in the center of a massif that is difficult to access. Lars Lode, a missionary linguist, estimated a lexical similarity of 95% between the two varieties using a 100-word list. The Dugun consider themselves to be a subgroup of the Dii (or Duru) people. Their language, although closely related to Dii, is distinct.

The Dii (47,000 speakers (SIL 1982)) live east of the Dugun. They live in a large part of the Bénoué River plains, including in the departments of Mayo-Rey (Tcholliré commune, North Region) and Vina (Mbé and Ngaoundéré communes, Adamaoua Region). They are predominantly located to the east of Poli in the plains of Mayo-Sala and Mayo-Rey (in Tcholliré commune) as well as in the upper Benue River region (in Lagdo commune) and the upper Vina River region (in Nganha and Mbé communes), on the edge of the Adamaoua cliff (Ngaoundéré commune). Nyok, considered by other Dii speakers to be a secret language (the language of sorcerers), may be a distinct language. Furthermore, not much is known about Goom, which ALCAM (2012) considers to be a dialect of Dii.

== Writing System ==
Alphabet
Uppercase letters
A	B	Ɓ	D	E	Ɛ	Ə	F	G	Gb	H	I	Ɨ	L	M	ʼM	Mb	Mgb	N	ʼN	Nd	Nz	Ŋ	Ŋg	O	Ɔ	R	S	U	Ʉ	V	Vb	W	ʼW	Y	ʼY	Z
Lowercase letters
a	b	ɓ	d	e	ɛ	ə	f	g	gb	h	i	ɨ	l	m	ʼm	mb	mgb	n	ʼn	nd	nz	ŋ	ŋg	o	ɔ	r	s	u	ʉ	v	vb	w	ʼw	y	ʼy	z

Nasalisation is indicated with a cedilla : ‹a̧, ȩ, ə̧, i̧, o̧, u̧› ; The vowels ‹ɨ, ɔ, ʉ› cannot be nasalized.

The tones are indicated by accents:

- The high tone is indicated by an acute accent: ‹á, á̧, é, ȩ́, ə́, ə̧́, í, í̧, ɨ́, ó, ó̧, ɔ́, ú, ú̧, ʉ́› ;
- The low tone is indicated by a grave accent: ‹à, à̧, è, ȩ̀, ə̀, ə̧̀, ì, ì̧, ɨ̀, ò, ò̧, ɔ̀, ù, ù̧, ʉ̀› ;
- The average tone is indicated by no diacritic: ‹a, a̧, e, ȩ, ə, ə̧, i, i̧, ɨ, o, o̧, ɔ, u, u̧, ʉ›.
