= Aliyu Wakili Boya =

Nigerian politician and lawyer

Barrister Aliyu Wakili Boya

Representative of Fufore and Song at the 10th National Assembly
- Incumbent
- Assumed office 13 June 2023
- Preceded by: Mustafa Muhammed Saidu

Youth leader of Adamawa
- Incumbent
- Assumed office 1 April 2018
- Appointed by: Lamido Barkindo
- Preceded by: Abdul-Aziz Nyako

Personal details
- Born: 1 January 1978 (age 48) Malabu, Fufore
- Party: All Progressives Congress
- Relations: Njidda Pariya
- Education: University of Maiduguri
- Profession: Lawyer, Politician

Hon. Barr. Aliyu Wakili Boya (born 1978) is a Nigerian politician and lawyer who is a member of the House of Representatives for Fufore/Song constituency in Adamawa state. He previously served as the chairman of Fufore Local Government and the chairman of All Local Governments Organisation of Nigeria (ALGON) in Adamawa state.

== Early life and education ==
Boya was born on 1 January 1978 in the town of Malabu in Fufore. He pursued his education at the University of Maiduguri, where he obtained his Bachelor's degree in Law. Following that, he completed his legal training at the Abuja Law School, becoming a Barrister.

== Political career ==
Boya was the Senior Chief Legislative Aide to the former Senator of Adamawa Central, Bello Tukur, between 2011 and 2015. He was later elected the Executive Chairman of Fufore. During the same period, he was appointed Chairman of the Association of Local Governments in Nigeria (ALGON) for Adamawa State.

During the 2023 Nigerian General Election, Boya contested for the House of Representatives seat representing the Fufore/Song constituency as the candidate for the All Progressives Congress (APC). He won with a margin of 4,632 votes defeating his opponent who was the incumbent holder of the seat, Mustafa Muhammed Saidu, who ran under the Peoples Democratic Party (PDP).

== Traditional titles ==
On April 1, 2018, Boya received an appointment as the Lamido derke'en in Fulfulde which means the leader of youth of Adamawa by Lamido Barkindo. This position designates him as the leader of the youth in Adamawa. During his turbaning ceremony, notable individuals such as Sanusi Lamido, the former Emir of Kano, and Atiku Abubakar, the former Vice-president of Nigeria who holds the traditional title of Waziri of Adamawa, were present as guests.
