= Bata language =

Afro-Asiatic language spoken in Nigeria and Cameroon

Bata
- Gbwata
- Native to: Nigeria, Cameroon
- Region: Adamawa State, North Region
- Native speakers: 300,000 (2020)
- Language family: Afro-Asiatic: Chadic; Biu–Mandara; Bata languages (A.8); Bata
- Dialects: Zumu; Wadi; Malabu; Kobocī; Ribow; Njoboliyo; Garua; Jirai; Furo; Song Bata
- Writing system: Latin

Language codes
- ISO 639-3: bta – inclusive code Individual code: kso – Kofa
- Glottolog: bata1314
- ELP: Kofa
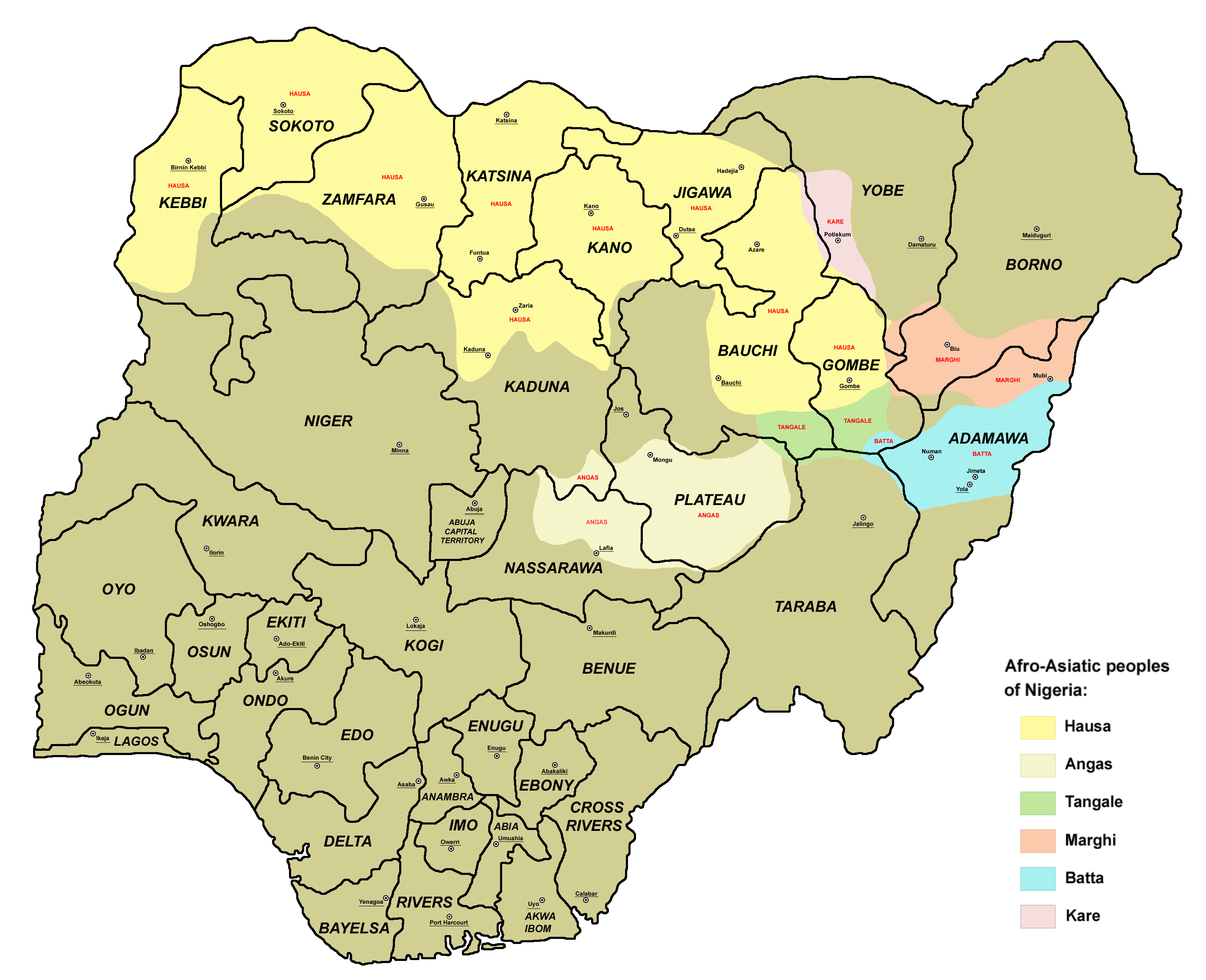
- Ethnic territories of the Bata-speaking people (Batta) in Nigeria, in blue

Bata
- Person: Gbwata
- Language: Magbwata

Bata (Gbwata) is an Afro-Asiatic language spoken in Nigeria in Adamawa State in the Numan, Song, Fufore and Jimeta gire Yola maiha Demsa lamorde LGAs, and in Cameroon in North Province along the border with Nigeria. Dialects are Demsa, Garoua, Jirai, Kobotachi, Malabu, Ndeewe, Ribaw, Wadi, and Zumu (Jimo). It is often considered the same language as Bacama.

== Names ==
Blench (2019) lists Bwatye (endonym: Ɓwaare; exonym: Bachama) as a closely related language variety. They are located in Adamawa State (Numan and Guyuk LGAs) and Kaduna State (northeast of Kaduna town). It is also called Kwā ɓwàryē.

ALCAM (2012) lists Gbwata (Bwaara in Nigeria) as the singular personal form of Bata. The speakers refer to their language as "the language of the Gbwata", called Magbwatá, Magbwati or Magbwatiye in Cameroon.

== Dialects ==
In Cameroon, there are three varieties of Gbwata:

- Demsa (Demsa commune in Bénoué department, which is on the Nigerian border, 30 km northeast of Garoua)
- Kokoumi (Garoua commune, Bénoué department, which is along the Benue River)
- Faro (Jelepo in Beka commune, Faro department)

Ndeewe is the dialect of the Gbwata who live far from the banks of the Faro and Benue rivers, where the "agricultural Bata" live. It is now spoken by only a few dozen people.

Bacama is a Gbwata ethnic group settled in Nigeria.

There are 2,500 speakers in Cameroon.

== Phonology ==
=== Consonants ===
		Labial	Alveolar	Retroflex	Post-alv./ Palatal	Velar	Labio- velar	Glottal
Nasal		m	n		(ɲ)			
Stop/ Affricate	voiceless	p	t			k	k͡p	ʔ
Stop/ Affricate	voiced	b	d		(d͡ʒ)	ɡ	ɡ͡b	
Stop/ Affricate	prenasal	ᵐb	ⁿd		(ⁿd͡ʒ)	ᵑɡ	ᵑɡ͡b	
Stop/ Affricate	implosive	ɓ	ɗ					
Fricative	voiceless	f	s		(ʃ)			h
Fricative	voiced	v	z					
Fricative	prenasal		ⁿz					
Rhotic				ɽ				
Lateral				ɭ				
Approximant					j		w	

- Sounds [ɲ, ʃ, d͡ʒ ⁿd͡ʒ] may occur optionally as independent sounds, or as allophones of /n, s, z, ⁿz/ in palatalized positions.

=== Vowels ===
	Front	Central	Back	
Close	i		ɯ	u
Mid	e	ə	o	
Open		a		
