= Bali language (Adamawa) =

Niger–Congo language spoken in Nigeria

Bali
- Ị̀báalí
- Native to: Nigeria
- Region: Demsa, Adamawa, Nigeria
- Ethnicity: Bali people (Africa)
- Native speakers: (2,000 cited 1991)
- Language family: Niger–Congo?: Atlantic–Congo; Leko–Nimbari; Mumuye–Yendang; Yendang; Bali

Language codes
- ISO 639-3: bcn
- Glottolog: bali1245
- ELP: Bali

Baali
- Person: Bibaali
- People: Abaali
- Language: Ị̀báalí

Bali (also known as Bibaali, Maya, Abaali, Ibaale, or Ibaali) is a Niger–Congo language spoken by 100,000 people (as of 2006) in Demsa, Adamawa, Nigeria.
