= Hosséré Vokré =

Isolated plateau in the North Region of Cameroon

- Location within Cameroon

Highest point
- Elevation: 2,049 m (6,722 ft)
- Prominence: 1,490 m (4,890 ft)
- Listing: Ribu
- Coordinates: 8°20′36″N 13°14′44″E

Dimensions
- Area: 930 km^{2} (360 mi^{2})

Geography
- Country: Cameroon
- Region: North Region

Hosséré Vokré is an isolated plateau in the North Region of Cameroon. It covers approximately 930 square kilometres (360 mi^{2}), and forms a broad u-shaped ridge that opens northwards toward the town of Poli. Its highest point is 2,049 metres (6,722 ft). ‘Hosséré' is a regional term for isolated massifs which rise above the savanna lowlands. The Hosséré Godé massif is close by to the northwest. It is separated from other mountains by lowlands less than 500 meters in elevation, including the Alantika Mountains to the northwest along the Nigeria–Cameroon border, and the Adamawa Plateau to the south.

The plateau is in the basin of the Benue River, and forms part of the divide between the upper Benue to the east and the Faro River, a tributary of the Benue, to the west.

The summit is made up of large granite boulders which form deep crevices and caves, and large boulders are common along mountain watercourses.

== Flora and fauna ==
The plateau is mostly covered with dry wooded savanna. There are smaller areas of montane moist forest, mostly in ravines and as gallery forests along watercourses. The most common trees in the moist forests are the large broadleaf evergreen Syzygium guineense, the palm Phoenix reclinata, the conifer Podocarpus milanjianus, and the smaller broadleaf trees Hymenodictyon floribundum and Symphonia sp. Podocarpus milanjianus is typically a tree of Afromontane forests, and this is its northernmost occurrence in Cameroon, where it is otherwise restricted to the western highlands. It typically grows to small size (5 meters or fewer) on the mountain.

Native mammals include the olive baboon (Papio anubis), Tantalus monkey (Chlorocebus tantalus), mantled guereza (Colobus guereza), mountain reedbuck (Redunca fulvorufula adamauae), common duiker (Sylvicapra grimmia), African wild cat (Felis lybica), African savanna hare (Lepus victoriae), and rock hyrax (Procavia capensis).

92 species of birds were recorded on the mountain. Most are savanna species, with 31 species characteristic of forests and forest edges. Three montane forest birds, the northern double-collared sunbird (Cinnyris reichenowi preussi), pink-footed puffback (Dryoscopus angolensis), and Bangwa forest warbler (Bradypterus bangwaensis), are native to the plateau, which is the northernmost record of these three species.

Ancylodactylus alantika is a lizard known only from the Hosséré Vokré and Alantika Mountains, where it lives on boulders in moist montane forests. three species of Trachylepis lizards are also native to the plateau, with Trachylepis maculilabris living along streams in moist forests and T. perrotetii and T. quinquetaeniata living on drier slopes. The slender blind snake Letheobia decorosus is also native to the plateau.

== People ==
The massif is densely populated, and local people grow a variety of crops and raise livestock.

The Duupa (or Dupa) people live in the mountains and the adjacent plains. They are mostly farmers, growing grains (sorghum, pearl millet, and eleusine), and yams, cowpea, groundnuts, and okra.

== Conservation ==
Large areas of the plateau are seasonally burned to expand livestock pasture, and larger wild animals are hunted for food and to keep them away from crops. Larger wildlife is generally scarce, and none of the plateau is in protected areas.
