= Doayo cattle =

Breed of cattle

The Doayo cattle is a breed of cattle found in the foothills of the Atlantika Mountains and Poli mountains in Bénoué division of the North Region of Cameroon. Kept by the Doayo people, they are classified as Savannah Shorthorns (Humpless Shorthorns), and are also known as Namji, Namchi, Namshi, Poli, Donayo, or M'Bougi. They are dwarf animals, measuring only 97 to 110 cm (38 to 43 in) at the withers, with mainly uniform black, black-and-white or spotted black coats, though brown or spotted brown coats also occur. The first calving takes place at three years, with a calving interval of one year. The cattle are not used commercially, instead they are kept for social and religious purposes. Several Daoyo are slaughtered at a funeral, depending on the importance of the deceased, and the skins are used to wrap the body.
