= Vere language =

Duru language spoken in Nigeria and Cameroon

Vere (Gwèri)
- Momi and mom Jango
- Region: northern Nigeria and Cameroon
- Native speakers: (110,000 cited 2000)
- Language family: Niger–Congo?: Atlantic–Congo; Leko–Nimbari; Duru; Vere–Dowayo; Vere (Gwèri)
- Dialects: Mom Jango; Momi

Language codes
- ISO 639-3: ver
- Glottolog: momj1237 Mom Jango nort3260 Northern Alantika vere1252 Vere Kaadam (Momi)

The Gwèri or Vere language, also known as Kobo or Mom Jango, is a member of the Duru branch of Savanna languages. It is spoken across the northern Nigerian–Cameroonian border.

== Names ==
Vere is a cultural and geographical cover term that may include several completely distinct language varieties.

The Kobo (in three villages north of the Chamba Leko area) are the only group of people known as Vere in Cameroon. Kobo is spoken in Béka commune, Faro department, North Region.

Raymond Boyd had collected data from an ethnic Samba informant in Tignère speaking a language called Mome or Nya Kopo "language of the mountain", which he had learned from his mother. The lexicon is very different from "Kobo" as documented by ALCAM (2012), although both are clearly Adamawa languages. In this language, 'man' is called vere. However, according to Boyd, Mome or Nya Kopo is a Mumuye dialect. There are approximately 4,000 Kobo speakers in Cameroon. It is also spoken in Nigeria.

== Dialects ==
Dialects are Mom Jango and Momi (also known as Ziri). These are divergent enough they probably constitute distinct languages. Kleinewillinghöfer (2012) distinguishes three Vere languages:

- Mom Jango
- Northern Alantika Vere
- Vere Kaadam (Momi)

== Distribution ==
Jango is spoken in the villages of Mayo Ini, Nassarwo Koma, Jumɓaare, Mantunaa, Soncha (Choncha), Bambu, DanWumba, Tɛkɛrɛ, Korkai, Gawì, Zaari, Gerta, Kaau Pindu, Garau, Giwaare, Jagu suwa, Vam guiti, Gogura, Tondiire, and Layinde.
