= Mbei Village =

Village and chiefdom in Cameroon

Mbei Mbeï; Bafukom
- Village and traditional chiefdom
- Location within Cameroon
- Coordinates: 5°48′N 10°12′E
- Country: Cameroon
- Region: Northwest Region
- Division: Mezam Division
- Subdivision: Santa

Government
  - Type: Traditional monarchy
- Elevation: 1,796 m (5,892 ft)

Population (2005)
  - Total: 1,336

Mbei (also known as Mbeï or Bafukom) is a village and traditional chiefdom in the Santa Subdivision of the Northwest Region of Cameroon. It is one of the recognized rural settlements listed in the national census and forms part of the culturally rich Western Grassfields area.

== Geography ==
Mbei is situated within the Western High Plateau of Cameroon, a region characterized by volcanic soils, rolling hills, and a temperate climate favourable to agriculture. The village lies at an elevation of approximately 1,796 metres above sea level and is located near the town of Santa, along local rural road networks connecting surrounding communities.

== History ==
Like many chiefdoms in the Northwest Region, Mbei traces its origins to the historical migration and settlement patterns of Grassfields peoples. Oral traditions indicate that the community developed around kinship groups that later evolved into a centralized traditional authority under a Fon. The institution of the Fonship continues to play a central role in governance, land tenure, and cultural preservation.

== Population ==
According to the 2005 national population and housing census, Mbei had a population of 1,336 inhabitants. The population is composed primarily of indigenous Grassfields communities, with extended family compounds forming the basic social units.

== Language ==
The local population is associated with languages of the Grassfields Bantu subgroup. Linguistic studies place the area within the broader Ngamambo speech community, with close affinities to Moghamo and related varieties spoken in the Santa area.

== Economy ==
The economy of Mbei is predominantly agrarian. Residents engage in subsistence and small-scale commercial farming, cultivating crops such as maize, beans, cocoyam, and vegetables. Livestock rearing, including goats and poultry, complements agricultural activities. Periodic markets in nearby towns facilitate trade and exchange.

== Culture ==
Mbei maintains a vibrant cultural heritage typical of Grassfields chiefdoms. Traditional institutions, including secret societies and age-grade systems, contribute to social organization and community cohesion. Cultural expressions such as dance, music, and festivals are central to communal life and are often associated with agricultural cycles and royal ceremonies.

== Administration ==
Mbei functions as a traditional chiefdom under the leadership of a Fon, who serves as the custodian of customs and traditions. The chiefdom is subdivided into quarters administered by local lineage heads and notables who assist in governance, conflict resolution, and the management of communal affairs.

== See also ==
- Grassfields (Cameroon)

== Bibliography ==
- Lem, Lilian; Brye, Edward (2008). Rapid appraisal sociolinguistic language survey of Ngamambo of Cameroon. SIL International. p. 3.
- Tunviken, Jonas (2013). A Phonological Sketch of Moghamo: a Narrow Grassfields Bantu Language. Yaoundé: SIL International. pp. 1–43.
