= Kugama language =

Adamawa language spoken in Nigeria

Kugama
- Native to: Nigeria
- Region: Adamawa state
- Native speakers: (5,000 Kugama cited 1995) unclear if figure for Gengle is additional or duplicate
- Language family: Niger–Congo?: Atlantic–Congo; Leko–Nimbari; Mumuye–Yendang; Yendang; Kugama

Language codes
- ISO 639-3: Either: kow – Kugama geg – Gengle (duplicate code)
- Glottolog: kuga1239

Wã̀m
- Language: ɲáː wàm

Kugama, also known as Wam (Wã̀m) or Gengle, is an Adamawa language of Nigeria. It is spoken in Mayo-Belwa and Fufore Local Government Areas of Adamawa State. It is classified within the Yendang group of the Adamawa language family.

Speakers refer to their language as ɲáː wàm. Kugama is an exonym that is often used by the speakers themselves when speaking in other languages, while Wã̀m is the name they use to refer to themselves.
