= Kumba language =

Adamawa language of Nigeria

Kumba
- Sate
- Yofo
- Native to: Nigeria
- Region: Adamawa state
- Native speakers: (3,400 cited 2000)
- Language family: Niger–Congo?: Atlantic–Congo; Leko–Nimbari; Mumuye–Yendang; Kumba

Language codes
- ISO 639-3: ksm
- Glottolog: kumb1238

Kumba, also known as Sate and Yofo, is an Adamawa language of Nigeria.
