= Perema language =

Leko language spoken in Nigeria

Wom
- Perema
- Native to: Nigeria
- Region: Adamawa State
- Native speakers: (5,000 cited 1989)
- Language family: Niger–Congo?: Atlantic–Congo; Leko–Nimbari; Leko; Wom

Language codes
- ISO 639-3: wom
- Glottolog: womn1235

- Person: Pere
- People: Pereba
- Language: Perema

Wom ([w̃ɔ̃̀m]), or Perema, is a Leko language of Nigeria.

== Phonology ==
Consonants are:

m	n			[ŋ]		
b	d		ɟ	ɡ	ɡb ~ ɡʷ	
p	t		c	k	kp ~ kʷ	(ʔ)
f v	s z	ʃ ʒ		x		(h)
	r					
	l		j		w	

/ŋ/, and only /ŋ/, appears geminate. /ʔ/ is rare, perhaps borrowed. /h/ is known from one word, not borrowed.

Vowels are /i e ɛ a ə ɔ o u/. All may be doubled, but there are no long vowels. /a/ is neutralized to /ə/ in all but final position.

Tone is probably high, low, and falling, as in Chamba Leko.
