= Mustafa Muhammed Saidu =

Nigerian politician (born 1961)

Member of House of Representatives
- In office 2019–2023
- Constituency: Fufure/Song Federal Constituency

Personal details
- Born: 1961 (age 64–65)
- Party: Peoples Democratic Party
- Occupation: Politician

Mustafa Muhammed Saidu is a Nigerian politician. He was a member representing Fufure/Song Federal Constituency in the House of Representatives.

He was born in 1961 and hails from Adamawa State. He succeeded Aminu Ribadu and was elected to the National Assembly in 2019. However, he was unsuccessful in his bid for re-election in 2023.

== Early life and education ==
Mustafa Muhammed Saidu was born in 1961 in Adamawa State, Nigeria.

== Political career ==
Mustafa Muhammed Saidu is a Nigerian politician who represented the Fufure/Song Federal Constituency of Adamawa State in the House of Representatives of Nigeria from 2019 to 2023. He was elected on the platform of the People's Democratic Party (PDP) in the 2019 general election, succeeding Aminu Ribadu. He served in the 9th National Assembly until the end of his tenure in 2023, when he was succeeded by Aliyu Wakili Boya following the 2023 general election.
