= Ancylodactylus alantika =

Conservation status
- Endangered (IUCN 3.1)

Scientific classification
- Kingdom: Animalia
- Phylum: Chordata
- Class: Reptilia
- Order: Squamata
- Suborder: Gekkota
- Family: Gekkonidae
- Genus: Ancylodactylus
- Species: A. alantika

Binomial name
- Ancylodactylus alantika Malonza & Bauer, 2022

Synonyms
- Cnemaspis alantika Bauer, Chirio, Ineich & LeBreton, 2006

Species of lizard

Ancylodactylus alantika is a species of gecko. It is endemic to the Alantika Mountains and Hosséré Vokré plateau in Cameroon.
