= Yendang language =

Savanna language spoken in Nigeria

Yendang
- Region: northeastern Nigeria
- Native speakers: (50,000 cited 1987)
- Language family: Niger–Congo?: Atlantic–Congo; Leko–Nimbari; Mumuye–Yendang; Yendang; Yendang

Language codes
- ISO 639-3: ynq
- Glottolog: yend1241

Yendang is a member of the Leko–Nimbari group of Savanna languages. It is spoken in northeastern Nigeria. Dialects are Kuseki, Yofo, Poli (Akule, Yakule).

== ISO code ==
Yendang's ISO 639-3 code was changed from 'yen' to 'ynq' in March 2012 when Yotti was recognized as a distinct language; older references may still link to the older code.
