= Baligashu =

- Location within Cameroon
- Coordinates: 5°48′52″N 10°23′20″E
- Country: Cameroon
- Region: Northwest
- Department: Ngo-Ketunjia
- Elevation: 1,138 m (3,734 ft)

Population (2005)
  - Total: 4,102
- (Census)
- Time zone: UTC+1 (WAT)

Baligashu is one of the five villages of Balikumbat Sub Division and one of thirteen villages of Ngoketunjia Division in Ngo-Ketunjia department, Northwest Region, Cameroon. Baligashu is currently ruled by HRM DOH GAHWULUBI II, He has ruled the village since 1989. To Foster her development Baligashu is created - Baligashu Development Association (BADA) with branches all over the ten Regions of Cameroon - rallying its sons and daughters to promote the development of the Village

== See also ==
- Communes of Cameroon
