= Numan, Nigeria =

Numan Nomweh
- LGA and town
- Interactive map of Numan
- Location within Nigeria
- Coordinates: 9°28′N 12°2′E
- Country: Nigeria
- State: Adamawa State

Area
  - Total: 803.9 km^{2} (310.4 sq mi)

Population (2022)
  - Total: 141,200
  - Density: 175.6/km^{2} (454.9/sq mi)
- Time zone: UTC+1 (WAT)

Numan, also known as Nomweh (meaning 'hilltop'), is a town and a Local Government Area in Adamawa State, Nigeria. It is a port town that lies on the confluence of Benue River and Gongola River.

The predominant ethnic group in the town are the Bwatiye (Bachama) people who have a reputation of being unconquered warriors in all their history. The Bwatiye people are led by a First Class King known as the Hama Bachama, who is the paramount ruler of the Bachama Kingdom, whose Voti (palace) is in Numan the administrative seat of the throne while Lamurde has another palace for the King as that is the spiritual or ancestral home of the Bwatiye people. The name of the current King is Homun (King) Dr Daniel Ismaila Shaga OON, who ascended the throne in 2020. The Queen of the Bachama kingdom is referred to as Mbamto (Queen) and she is Mbamto Rosaline Daniel Ismaila Shaga. They currently have four children whose names aren't identified yet.

The town is the location of Adamawa State Polytechnic.

== Demography ==
In a 2023 demographic survey of Internally displaced persons (IDPs), the local government was found to be predominantly Bachama (Bwatiye) speaking. The most commonly reported languages (spoken at homes and places of primary residence) present in the local government area were: Bachama/Bwatiye – 46.2%, Hausa – 28.2%, and Mbula–Bwazza – 6.2%. Other languages included; Kanuri – 2.8%, Bura – 2.8%, Fulfulde, specifically Eastern or Adamawa Fulfulde – 2.3%, Longuda – 1.7%, Waja – 1.2%, Berom – 1.2%, Bali – 1.2%, and Eleven other languages spoken by groups under 1% each. This data was not obtained from a nationally co-ordinated population headcount. The last time Nigeria included ethnic and linguistic data in its enumeration parameters was in the national census of 1963.

== Climate/Geography ==
In Numan, the dry season is oppressively hot and partially cloudy, and the wet season is oppressively hot and overcast. The average annual temperature fluctuates between 15–37 °C (59–99 °F), rarely falling below 13 °C (55 °F) or rising over 41 °C (106 °F).

The Benue and Gongola Rivers meet in Numan LGA, where the average temperature is 34 °C (93 °F). With an average humidity level of 18%, the LGA experiences two distinct seasons: the dry and the rainy.

== Economy ==
In the Numan LGA, farming is a major economic activity, and crops including peanuts, cowpea, sorghum, and millet are produced. In the LGA, a variety of animals, including cows, donkeys, and goats, are raised and sold. The Numan LGA is home to a number of markets that serve as trading hubs for a range of commodities, and trade there is also thriving. Hunting and leatherworking are two more significant economic activities in the Numan LGA.
