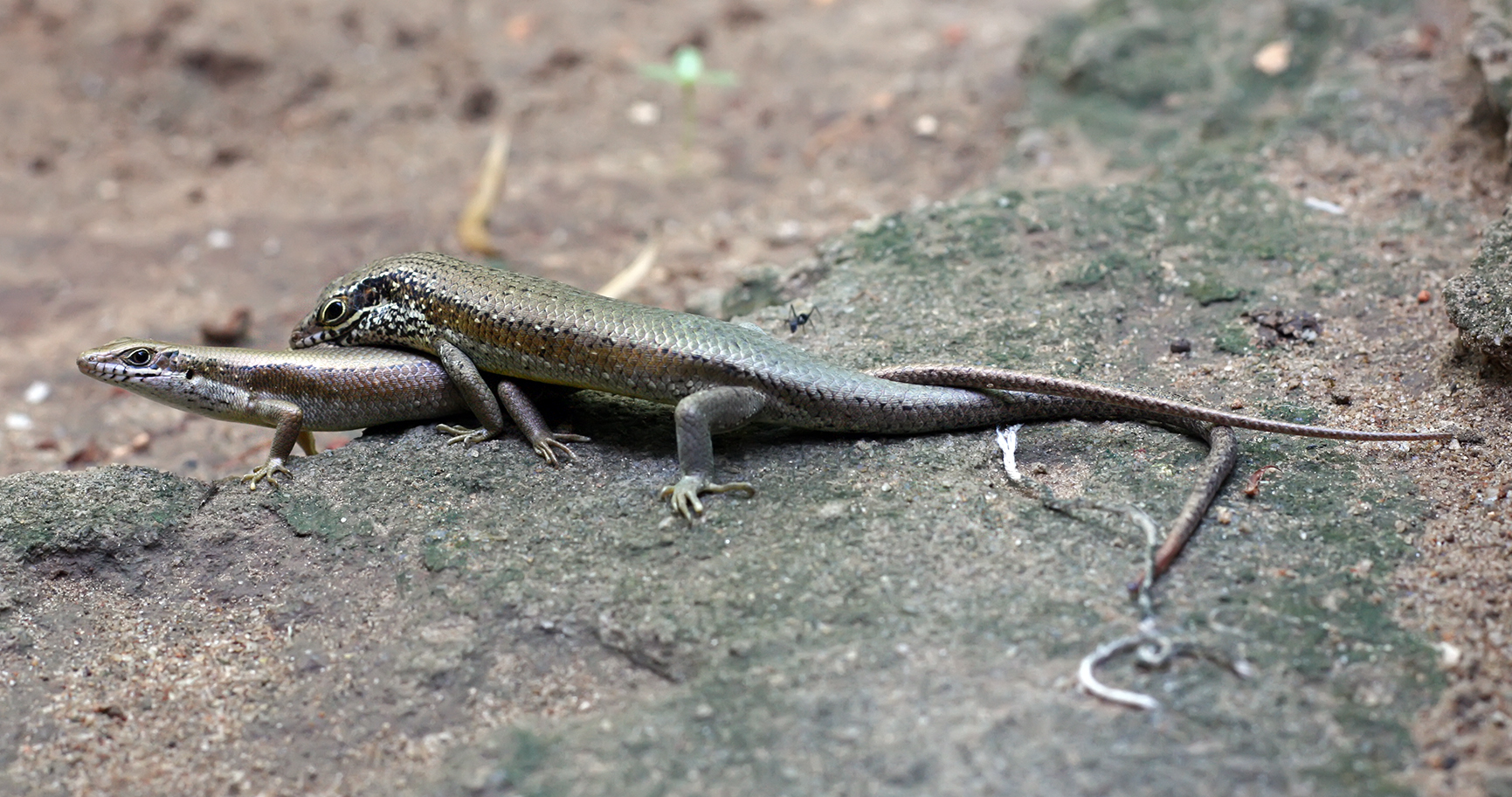

Scientific classification
- Kingdom: Animalia
- Phylum: Chordata
- Class: Reptilia
- Order: Squamata
- Family: Scincidae
- Genus: Trachylepis
- Species: T. maculilabris

Binomial name
- Trachylepis maculilabris (Gray, 1845)

= Trachylepis maculilabris =

Species of lizard

Trachylepis maculilabris is a species of skink. Commonly referred to as the speckle-lipped skink or speckle-lipped mabuya. It is distributed through much of sub-Saharan Africa.
