= Leko languages =

Language group of Africa

Leko
- Geographic distribution: northern Cameroon, eastern Nigeria
- Linguistic classification: Niger–Congo?: Atlantic–Congo; Savannas; Leko–Nimbari; Leko

Language codes
- Glottolog: leko1246

The Leko languages are a small group of languages spoken in northern Cameroon and eastern Nigeria. They were labeled "G2" in Joseph Greenberg's Adamawa language-family proposal. The Duru languages are frequently classified with the Leko languages, although their relationship remains to be demonstrated.

== Languages ==
The languages are:

- Kolbila
- Nyong
- Chamba Leko
- Wom

== Names and locations (Nigeria) ==
Below is a list of language names, populations, and locations (in Nigeria only) from Blench (2019).

Language	Dialects	Alternate spellings	Own name for language	Endonym(s)	Other names (location-based)	Other names for language	Exonym(s)	Speakers	Location(s)
Nyong		Nyɔŋ	Nyɔŋ Nyanga	sg. Nyɔŋvena, pl. Nyɔŋnepa (Nyongnepa)	Mumbake, Mubako			10,000 (SIL)	Adamawa State, Mayo Belwa LGA, West of Mayo Belwa town, Bingkola and 5 other villages
Pere			Perema	sg. Pena, pl. Pereba	Wom (town name)			Spoken in 10 villages around Yadim: Fewer than 4,000	Adamawa State, Fufore LGA
Samba Leko		Chamba Leko, Samba Leeko	Sama	Samba		Leko, Suntai		42,000 total (1972 SIL); 50,000 (1971 Welmers)	Taraba State, Ganye, Fufore, Wukari and Takum LGAs; mainly in Cameroon
