= Chamba Leko =

Language of northern Nigeria and Cameroon

Chamba
- Samba Leekɔ
- Region: northern Nigeria and Cameroon
- Ethnicity: Chamba people
- Native speakers: (62,000 in Nigeria cited 2000)
- Language family: Niger–Congo?: Atlantic–Congo; Leko–Nimbari; Leko; Chamba

Language codes
- ISO 639-3: ndi
- Glottolog: samb1305

Chamba Leko is one of two languages spoken by the Chamba people, the other being Chamba Daka. It is a member of the Leko branch of Savanna languages, and is spoken across the northern Nigerian–Cameroonian border.

Chamba is also spelled 'Samba', Leko also 'Leeko', 'Lego' or 'Lekon'. The language is also known as Suntai.

== Dialects ==
Samba, also called Samba Leeko, is highly distinct from Chamba Daka, also called Daga Mumi ('language of the Daka'), spoken in Nigeria by another subgroup of the Chamba people. These two languages are respectively classified in groups 2 and 3 of the Adamawa branch by Joseph Greenberg (see Adamawa languages).

In Cameroon, the two main groups of dialects are:

- Samba languages proper (consisting of the Samba Leeko, Deenu, Bangla, Wangai varieties, as well as Sampara, mainly spoken in Nigeria) located between the Alantika Mountains in one area, and Faro and Mayo-Déo as well (in the south of Béka commune, Bénoué department, North Region)
- Daganjonga, spoken in two enclaves of 25,000 speakers surrounded by Grassfields languages, near the Ndop Plain (more than 400 kilometers from the Alantika Mountains). It is spoken in the villages of Balikumbat, Baligashu, Baligashu (Balikumbat commune, Ngoketunjia department, North-West Region) and Baligam (Santa commune, Mezam department, North-West Region)

== Phonology ==
=== Consonants ===
		Labial	Labiodental	Apical	Palatal	Velar	Labial–velar	Glottal
Fricative	Voiceless	p	f	t	s	k	kp	ʔ
Fricative	Voiced	b	v	d	z	g	gb	
Nasal		m		n	ɲ	ŋ	̰w	
Oral				l	y		w	(h)
Flap			(ⱱ)	(r)				

=== Vowels ===
	Front	Central	Back
Close	i	ə	u
Mid	e	ə	o
Open	ɛ	a	ɔ
