= Bacama language =

Chadic language spoken in Nigeria

Bacama
- Ɓwaare
- Native to: Nigeria
- Region: Adamawa State, Kogi State
- Native speakers: 300,000 (2020)
- Language family: Afro-Asiatic: Chadic; Biu–Mandara; Bata (A.8); Bacama
- Dialects: Kwa Bwatiye; Demsa Bata
- Writing system: Latin

Language codes
- ISO 639-3: bcy
- Glottolog: baca1246 Bacama baca1245 Bacama-Yimburu

Bacama (Bachama) is an Afro-Asiatic language of the Central Chadic branch that is spoken in Nigeria in Adamawa State principally in the Numan, Demsa and Lamurde Local Government Areas by the Bwatiye people. The dialect spoken is Kwa Bwatiye. There is Basa Pwa and Basa Voti and Njiya. The basa pwa accent is slightly different from that of bass Pwa and voti but all are the same people and tribe. Bachama is used as a trade language. It is often considered the same language as Bata.

== Numerals ==
Bachama has a decimal/quinary number system, with both 5 and 10 as bases:

1	2	3	4	5	6	7	8	9	10
hido	kpe	mwakin	fwot	tuf	tukoltaka	tukolukpe	fwofwot	dombi hido	bau

8 is 4-4, 6 and 7 are based on adding to 5, and 9 means '(10) less 1'.

== Example Texts in Bacama ==
- Gibo ma ḅa ḍa motso da Pwa tsi ne ndso-nogi ka nji-nogi ka nogi. - Mark 3:35 (GWVS 1915)

== Other Resources available in Bacama ==
Audio Recordings in Bacama
