= Nedong =

Nedong may refer to:

- Nedong, Shannan, a district in the Tibet Autonomous Region, China
- Nêdong (village), a village in Tibet
