= Bamunkumbit =

- Nickname: Mankong
- Location within Cameroon
- Coordinates: 5°49′00″N 10°25′00″E
- Country: Cameroon
- Region: Northwest
- Division: Ngo-Ketunjia
- Subdivision: Balikumbat

Government
  - His Royal Highness, Fon: Ayeng III
- Elevation: 1,138 m (3,734 ft)

Population (2005)
  - Total: 20,000
- (Census)
- Time zone: UTC+1 (WAT)

Bamunkumbit is one of the thirteen villages that make up Ngo-Ketunjia Division of the North West Region, Cameroon. Officially called Bamunkumbit, it is also referred to by the indigenes as Mankong.

== History ==
Mangeh villages believe that Mangeh had five children, two sons (Tuningmungwa and Chengfong) and three daughters (Byiae, Vhenji and Mekheng). The eldest Tunigmungwa succeeded their father and formed Bambalang while his brother Chengfong established the Bamunka village whereas Byiae formed Bamali, Vhenji formed Bafanji and Mekheng the Bamunkumbit village. Bambalang and Bamunka were descendants of the males (sons of Mangeh) while Bafanji, Bamunkumbit and Bamali are the descendants of the daughters. These five villages have formed the Mangeh Family Association to maintain peace and unity amongst themselves to ensure progress of all. These villages have no defined boundary between them because they know that they are one. Mangeh branches are found all over the country and abroad.

== List of Fons ==
- Fong Mankong, Fᶗ Maŋkɔ̧
- Fong Ngwabeng, Fᶗ ŋgwabᶓ
- Fong Lohniki I, Fᶗ Loonṫki I
- Fong Nkarndeh, Fᶗ ŋkarndǝ
- Fong Loniki II, Fᶗ Loonṫki II
- Fong Ayeng I, Fᶗ Ayᶓ I
- Fong Ngabngwoa, Fᶗ ŋgabgwaa
- Fong Nchitimbi, Fᶗ Nchitɨmbi
- Fong Achenkwi, Fᶗ Achɛŋkwi
- Fong Ateh Fong, Fᶗ Atø’fᶗ
- Fong Achemange, Fᶗ Achɛmaŋge
- Fong Chopnkwi Ngulang, Fᶗ Chɔbŋkwi
- Fong Muankwoa, Fᶗ Mwaŋkwa
- Fong Akissa Nghengwe, Fᶗ Akisha’ ŋṫŋgwą
- Fong Achekinjim, Fᶗ Achɛkṫjim
- Fong Achefong Ngukum, Fᶗ Achɛfᶗ ŋgɨkum
- Fong Nkonhkwen, Fᶗ ŋkɔ’ ŋkwᶓ
- Fong Kaabu, Fᶗ ŋkaabu’
- Fong Akissafong II, Fᶗ Akisha’fᶗ II
- Fong Ngwafong I, Fᶗ ŋgwąfᶗ I
- Fong Ngwafong Ngute I,I Fᶗ ŋgwąfᶗ ŋgɨtɛɛ II
- Fong Chofong I, Fᶗ Chɔfᶗ I
- Fong Ayeng II, Fᶗ Ayᶓ II
- Fong Ngwafong III, Fᶗ ŋgwąfᶗ II
- Fong Chofong II, Fᶗ Chɔfᶗ II
- Fong Ayeng III, Fᶗ Ayᶓ III [ Recent]

== Location ==
As one of the five villages that make up Balikumbat Subdivision under Ngo-Ketunjia Division, Bamunkumbit shares a common boundary with Bafanji, Baligashu, Balikumbat, Baligansin, Awing (all in the North West Region) and Bamenyan (in the West Region).

== Religion ==
More than half of Bamunkumbit villagers, particularly the elderly, are traditionalists. They hold so firmly to their native beliefs and the worship of the kwifor. The Kwifor is the secret and supreme authority believed to be governing the village spiritually whereas the Fon is physical leader who governs the village. All villagers, with the Fon inclusive, are expected to be submissive to the Kwifor. The minority Mbororo community of Bamunkumbit are Muslims, but there is a dominant presence of Christian churches in Bamunkumbit village with the most common ones being Catholic, Presbyterian, Baptist, and Full Gospel. In the year 2004, there was a great persecution of Christians who belonged to the Apostolic Church. These Christians were accused by the traditionalists for interfering in their tradition and were severely tortured and compelled to denounce their faith. Those who didn't denounce their faith were eventually driven out of the village. The Apostolic Church house was torn down in the process.

== Economic Activities ==
Bamunkumbit is a rural community with the greatest proportion of the population engaged in farming. The farming sector employs more than 70% of the total population. The farming population is mostly made up of the middle-aged and the aged. Farming in this village mostly for household consumption, with very little left for commercialization. Most of the youths often move out of the village into the cities for greener pastures. They mainly get involved in business or education.

== Agricultural Land Use ==
As an agricultural community, Bamunkumbit has a rich diversity of crops. Some of the crops cultivated in Bamunkumbit include: maize, groundnuts, beans, soya, cassava, yams, rice, cocoa-yams, etc. A great proportion of the population is also involved in grazing. Cattle in this village are mostly reared by the Mbororo community.

The increase in population is gradually putting pressure on land as many more people need land for agricultural and grazing purposes. To meet their needs, trees have been uncontrollably cut down, resulting to biodiversity loss, soil infertility, habitat destruction and loss of water and water resources. The Mbororo community who represent the minority group in this community and depend mostly on grazing, have overused the grazing field which, today, is vulnerable to erosion, degradation and infertility. The search for farm lands and grazing fields, has often resulted to constant farmers/grazers conflicts in recent years.

== See also ==
- Balikumbat
