= Balikumbat =

Coordinates: 5°54′N 10°23′E

- Commune and town
- Interactive map of Balikumbat
- Country: Cameroon
- Time zone: UTC+1 (WAT)

Balikumbat is a town and commune in Cameroon.

It comprises 5 villages :

- Bafanji
- Baligansin
- Baligashu
- Balikumbat (village)
- Bamunkumbit

== See also ==
- Communes of Cameroon
