= Baligham =

Ethnic group in Cameroon

The Baligham, also called the Nepgayidbi ("people of the palace") are an ethnic group in Cameroon. The Ndaghams left Bafu-Fondong (about 4 km from Dschang, western region of Cameroon), in the mid-18th century due to several factors including Fulani raids or Jihads, and famine caused by desertification.

In their long and eventful migration, the Baligamba kingdom had become too large and after the loss of their leader Gawolbe, quarrels over leadership occurred which led to the breakup of the kingdom into small factions. One by one, faction after faction left, each going their own way until the legitimate successor, Galanga, was left only with a handful of followers. These he named Nepgayidbi.

== Demographics ==
According to a Bamenda provincial census in 1997, there were 7,344 Balingham persons in Santa district, Cameroon. They were 8.8 % of the district's population. 46 % were males and 54 % were females.

== The History ==
During the German colonial administration in Cameroon (1884–1914), the Baligham area, like many regions in the Grassfields, was incorporated into the system of indirect rule. Traditional leaders such as the Fon of Baligham were recognized by the colonial authorities and used to facilitate administrative control, tax collection, and the enforcement of local order. German efforts to consolidate authority often involved cooperation with these indigenous institutions, though this also led to tensions with neighboring groups and resistance to colonial interference.

The Baligham polity was situated in a strategic zone of the western highlands, and its leadership played a role in local power dynamics that influenced German decisions about regional administration. These dynamics contributed to shifting inter-village alliances and disputes, some of which were exacerbated by colonial boundary demarcations and economic pressures imposed by the German regime.

== Culture ==
The Baligham engage primarily in slash and burn agriculture, including gardening and staple crops of potatoes and maize. They also gather fungi, sell them, and eat them, both as food and for their medicinal properties. Tomatoes are one of their major market crops. Climate change is impacting their way of life.

Their religions include Traditional beliefs, Christianity, and Islam.

== Politics ==
A land dispute in the 1990s with the Awing tribe lead to an outbreak of mass violence, which was resolved by an association of traditional tribal leaders.
