= Baligansin =

- Location within Cameroon
- Coordinates: 5°49′16″N 10°21′30″E
- Country: Cameroon
- Region: Northwest
- Department: Ngo-Ketunjia
- Elevation: 1,138 m (3,734 ft)

Population (2005)
  - Total: 1,080
- (Census)
- Time zone: UTC+1 (WAT)

Baligansin is one of the five autonomous villages of Balikumbat Sub Division, of Ngo-Ketunjia Division of Cameroon.

== See also ==
- Communes of Cameroon
