= Lamurde =

- LGA and town
- Nickname: Bachama
- Interactive map of Lamurde
- Location within Nigeria
- Coordinates: 9°36′N 11°47′E
- Country: Nigeria
- State: Adamawa State
- Established: 1981

Government
  - Local Government Chairman: Bulus Daniel (PDP)

Area
  - Total: 9,083 km^{2} (3,507 sq mi)

Population (2022)
  - Total: 571,600
  - Density: 62.93/km^{2} (163.0/sq mi)
- Time zone: UTC+1 (WAT)

Lamurde is a town and Local Government Area of Adamawa State, Nigeria inhabited predominantly by the Bwatiye (Bachama) and Tsobo people.

== History ==
The Lamurde Local Government was established on December 14, 1990, from the local government of Numan. Numerous local government areas in the state shares borders with it, including Taraba state to the west, Guyuk and Shelleng local government areas to the east, Gombe State to the north, and Numan local government to the south. The local government area is 2098 square kilometres in size, and it is located roughly between latitudes 10 24" west and 12 45" east, as well as 90 39" north and 90 11" south. The local government's population was 511.252 according to the 2006 census. Bwatiye (Bachama and Bata), Chobbo, Kwah, Waja, Mwana, Dadiya, Jenjo, Hausa, and Fulani are the ethnic groups present in the region.

== Demography ==
In a 2023 demographic survey of Internally displaced persons (IDPs), the most commonly reported languages (spoken at homes and places of primary residence) present in the local government area were; Bachama/Bwatiye – 31.9%, Waja – 23.8%, Hausa – 21.9%, Longuda – 12.2%, Unknown – 2.8%, Marghi – 2.6%, Kulung (Jarawa) – 1.9%, Fulfulde, specifically Eastern or Adamawa Fulfulde – 1.4%, Lamang – 1.4% with Mumuye, Kwami (close to Tangale) and Chamba Donga registering 0.5% each. This data was not obtained from a nationally co-ordinated population headcount. The last time Nigeria included ethnic and linguistic data in its enumeration parameters was in the national census of 1963.

== Climate ==
The rainy season in Lamurde is hot, humid, and overcast, whereas the dry season is hot and partially cloudy. Throughout the year, the temperature normally ranges from 16 °C (61 °F) to 38 °C (101 °F), with temperatures rarely falling below 13 °C (56 °F) or rising over 42 °C (107 °F).

== Air pollution ==
Air pollution, including dust from vehicles, poses a significant threat to public health, as it can be harmful and inhaled into the deepest parts of the lung.
