= Demsa =

- LGA and town
- Interactive map of Demsa
- Location within Nigeria
- Coordinates: 9°25′N 12°8′E
- Country: Nigeria
- State: Adamawa State
- Headquarters: Demsa

Population (2006)
  - Total: 180,251
- Time zone: UTC+1 (WAT)
- Postal code: 642

Demsa is a Local Government Area of Adamawa State, Nigeria with headquarters located in Demsa. Demsa lies on the Benue River.

== History ==
Demsa Local Government Area is one of the twenty one Local Government Area's in Adamawa State and has the postal code of 642.

The Local Government Area administrative office is situated in Demsa Town and has the incumbent Local Government Area Chairman as the head while the Chiefs are the head of the respective communities that made up the town, and the Councillors being the representatives of each wards that made up the community.

== People and languages ==
=== Population and ethnic groups ===
Population is 180,251. It is inhabited by ethnic groups such as the Bachama (Bwatiye) Batta, Yandang, Bille, Mbula, Maya, Bare and Fulani.

=== Languages ===
In a 2022 demographic survey of Internally displaced persons (IDPs), the most predominant languages (spoken at homes and places of primary residence) present in the local government area were; Bachama/Bwatiye – 21.5%, Hausa – 15.2%, Bali – 14.2%, Kutep – 9.9%, Fulfulde, specifically Eastern or Adamawa Fulfulde – 9.2%, Longuda – 5.6%, English – 5.6%, Mbula–Bwazza – 4.7%, Kilba/South Marghi – 3.2%, Bata (Gbwata) – 2.2%, Waka & Yendang – 1.3%, Wazan (Mofu) – 1.2%, Tula – 1.1%, Unknown – 1.1%, Chamba Donga – 1.1%, Dza (Jen) – 1.1%, Sibalenhon – 1.1%, and eight other languages under 0.5% each. This data was not obtained from a nationally co-ordinated population headcount. The last time Nigeria included ethnic and linguistic data in its enumeration parameters was in the national census of 1963.

== Climate ==
The rainy season in Yola is humid, oppressive, and overcast, whereas the dry season is hot and partially cloudy. Throughout the year, the temperature normally ranges from 63 °F to 103 °F, with temperatures rarely falling below 58 °F or rising over 108 °F.

=== Demsa's high temperatures ===
With an average daily high temperature of above 99 °F, the hot season lasts for 1.9 months, from February 26 to April 24. The hottest month in Demsa is April, with an average high temperature of 100 °F and low temperature of 81 °F.

=== Demsa's low temperature ===
With an average daily maximum temperature below 91 °F, the chilly season lasts 3.4 months, from June 18 to September 29. Demsa experiences its coldest month of the year in January, with an average low of 63 °F and high of 91 °F.

=== Demsa's cloud cover ===
The average proportion of sky covered by clouds in Demsa varies significantly seasonally throughout the year.

Around October 26 marks the start of Demsa's clearer season, which lasts for 4.5 months and ends around March 9.

In Demsa, January is the clearest month of the year, with the sky remaining clear, mostly clear, or partly cloudy 54% of the time.

Beginning around March 9 and lasting about 7.5 months, the cloudier period of the year ends around October 26.

May is the cloudiest month of the year in Demsa, with the sky being overcast or mostly cloudy 79% of the time on average during this month.

== Languages ==
The languages spoken in Demsa LGA are,

- Bachama
- wakka
- Bali
- Bata
- Bille
- Mbula-Bwazza
