= Santa, Cameroon =

Coordinates: 5°50′N 10°09′E

Santa
- Subdivision and town
- Interactive map of Santa
- Country: Cameroon
- Region: Northwest Region

Government
  - Council Mayor: HRH Hope Boma III

Population (2005)
  - Total: 8.124
- Time zone: UTC+1 (WAT)
- Website: http://santacouncil.org/

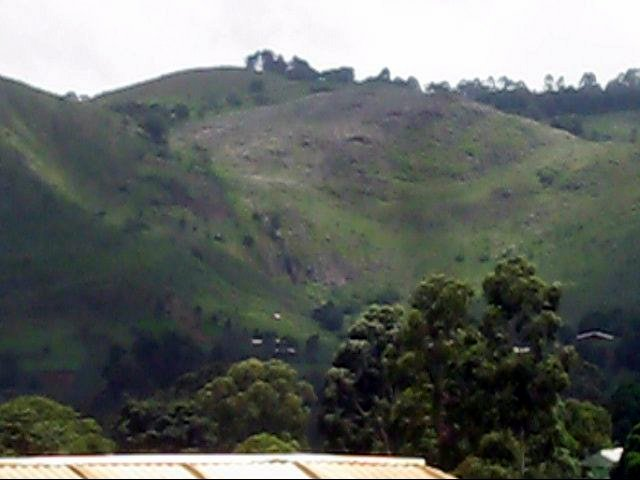

Santa Subdivision is a town and commune in Cameroon. Santa township comprises the villages Akum, Alatening, Santa, Meforbe, Bamock, Pinyin, Njong, Mbei, Awing, Baligham, Baba II, Mbu and Baforchu. Santa was founded in 1922 during British rule.

During the 2005 census, the municipality had 64,391 inhabitants, including 8,124 for Santa Town.

== See also ==
- Communes of Cameroon
