= Mumuye language =

Adamawa language of northeastern Nigeria

Mumuye
- Yoro
- Region: northeastern Nigeria
- Ethnicity: Mumuye people
- Native speakers: (400,000 cited 1993)
- Language family: Niger–Congo?: Atlantic–Congo; Leko–Nimbari; Mumuye–Yendang; Mumuye; Mumuye

Language codes
- ISO 639-3: mzm
- Glottolog: nucl1240

Mumuye is by far the most populous of the Adamawa languages. It is spoken in northeastern Nigeria. It is classified in the Leko–Nimbari branch of Savanna languages, as Adamawa is no longer considered a valid family. According to Ethnologue, there are multiple dialects: Zinna, Rang (Lamma), Dong, Yoro, Lankaviri, Gola (Bajama), Gongla, Kasaa, Saawa, Jalingo, Nyaaja, Jeng, Gnoore, Yaa, Sagbee, Shaari, Kugong, Mang, Kwaji, Meeka, Yakoko.

== Phonology ==
The Mumuye dialect of the town of Zing has the following inventory:

=== Vowels ===
	Front	Central	Back
Close	i		u
Close-mid			o
Open-mid	ɛ		ɔ
Open		a	

- [ə] occurs as an allophone of /i/.
- A lengthened version of /ɛː/ can be realized as close-mid [e].

=== Consonants ===
		Labial		Alveolar		Palatal (-alveolar)		Velar		Labial- velar		Glottal
		plain	postn.	plain	postn.	plain	postn.	plain	postn.	plain	postn.	Glottal
Nasal		m		n		ɲ		(ŋ)		(ŋm)		
Plosive	voiceless	p	pᵐ	t	tⁿ			k	kᵑ	kp	kpᵑᵐ	(ʔ)
Plosive	voiced	b	bᵐ	d	dⁿ			g	ɡᵑ	gb	ɡbᵑᵐ	
Implosive		ɓ										
Fricative	voiceless	f		s	s◌̃	ʃ	ʃ◌̃					h
Fricative	voiced	v	v◌̃	z	z◌̃	ʒ	ʒ◌̃					
Liquid	median			r	r◌̃	j	(j◌̃)			w	w◌̃	
Liquid	lateral			l								

- [ŋ͡m] is recorded in the post-nasal off-glide of labial-velar plosives.
- A glottal stop [ʔ] can be heard within a word-initial or word-final vowel or within syllabic nasals.
- /n/ is heard as a velar [ŋ] when in the following positions; word-final, before or after a consonant, or in isolation.
- The palatal /ɲ/ can have a post-nasal allophone of [j◌̃].
- /p, b/ may also occur as slightly aspirated [pʰ] or breathy [bʱ].
- /k͡p/ can also be heard as a labialized velar [kʷ] as a free variant.
- /w◌̃/ have allophones as [ʷ◌̃ŋ, ŋʷ◌̃, ʷ̃ŋ] when in free variation.
- Before /u/, /r/ is pre-labialized as [ʷr].

== Dialects ==
Mumuye dialects and their locations as classified and listed by Shimizu (1979):

- Mumuye proper
  - North-East Mumuye
    - Zing group
      - Gnoore, Jeng
      - Zing, Mang
      - Kwaji, Meeka
      - Yaa
  - South-West Mumuye
    - Monkin group
      - Kugong, Shaari
      - Sagbee
    - Kpugbong group
      - Kasaa, Yɔrɔ
      - Lankaviri, Saawa, Nyaaja, Jaalingo

=== Zing group ===
The Zing, or Northeast, group consists of 7 dialects.

Gnoorè is spoken in villages up to 4 km from Jeleng. The main settlement is Gomla (Gongla), also known as Gnoore in the local dialect. Gnoore-speaking settlements are Jeleng, Yulong, Koódèlèʔ, Kpong, Kokoli, Yugumaʔ, Kpmaapuʔ, Laanàpoʔ, and Doózolung.

Jeng is spoken in Dingding, Dondon gooriʔ, Kpmapo (Mapo), and Kwosa (Kwasa) villages, along the Sangudu and Dingding Rivers, both of which are tributaries of the Belwa River.

Zìng is spoken in the town of Zing (formerly Zinna) and the settlements of Tunàpo, Pényera, Dangbe (Dangberin), Bara, and others.

Máng is spoken in the Máng (Máná / Mánáng) village group, which consists of the 9 villages of Kurung, Dang, Yézòngko, Laákpááre, Yésènti, Dógang, Goba, Shóngkobo, and Dongkòbi.

Kwàji is spoken in Kwàji Bubúle, Kwàji, and Mashiiteʔ, which are villages in Kwaji District.

Meekà (Mika, Meika) is spoken in the settlements of Meeka, Sabon Garin Meeka, Kozòn (Kozang), Jassòòri (Jasori), Laya (Leya), Korong (Koron), Zangbangʔ, Nànpanʔ, and Bòòliʔ. It is spoken between the Zing-Jalingo road to the northeast and the Kunini River to the southwest.

Yàà (Yààkoko) is spoken in the settlements of Yaakoko, Doopa (Dopa), Kódnààri (Kondari), Yukwa, and Maazan. It is spoken along the Monkin River south of Zing.

=== Monkin group ===
The Monkin group is spoken to the south of the Zing group. Shimizu (1979) lists 3 dialects.

Kúgong is spoken in the settlements of Kugong Nasaraawò (Gurujè), Dààfa, Lakùnaʔ, and Dooroʔ, which are located around the peaks of Kugong and Gbole.

Shaari is spoken in the settlements of Danggòng, Bòòzi, Doóbura, Màng, Dèbángbu, and Dángsheeri, which are located to the south of Yukwa on the Monkin-Lama road.

Sàgbéè (Mònkín) is spoken in the settlements of Sàgbéè, Gangkula, Daraaraʔ, and Gboleʔ. Monkin town is located to the northwest of the Sàgbéè-speaking area.

=== Kpugbong group ===
The Kpugbong group is spoken in the southwest.

Kàsaà is spoken in the settlements of Kàsaà, Lambo, Ngba, Kwazanci, Tassa, Donkun, and Kodin.

Lànkàviri is spoken in Lànkàviri.

Saawà is spoken in and around Saawà (also known as Kpàntisaawà or Pantisaawa).

Yɔrɔ is spoken in Yɔrɔ settlement. It is claimed to be the original village from which all Mumuye people originate from, although hills isolate it geographically from the other Mumuye locations.

Nyaajà is spoken between the Saawa and Kasaa dialect areas.

Jààlingò is spoken in and around Jalingo town.

== See also ==
- List of Proto-Mumuye reconstructions (Wiktionary)
