= Beka, Cameroon =

Coordinates: 8.6448°N 13.0303°E

Beka
- Commune and town
- Interactive map of Beka
- Country: Cameroon
- Time zone: UTC+1 (WAT)

Beka is a town and commune in Cameroon.

== See also ==
- Communes of Cameroon
