= Atlantika Mountains =

Mountains in Cameroon and Nigeria

- Alantika Mountains
- Location within Cameroon

Highest point
- Peak: 1 885 m
- Coordinates: 8.661809°N 12.642517°E

Geography
- Countries: Cameroon and Nigeria

The Atlantika Mountains, also known as the Alantika Mountains, are an extension of the Cameroon line of volcanic mountains, spanning the border between Nigeria and Cameroon. They lie to the southeast of Yola, the capital of Adamawa State in Nigeria, and southwest of the Mandara mountains. In Cameroon, they are part of the North Region. They are north of the Adamawa Plateau and west of the Faro National Park in Cameroon. The massif rises to about 1,300 metres (4,300 ft) above the Faro River, a tributary of the Benue River. The range includes a belt of volcanoes, most of which are inactive. The mountains' landscape includes outcrops of large granite boulders.

The Atlantika Mountains are home to enclaves of higher-elevation Afromontane habitat, part of the Cameroonian Highlands forests ecoregion. The mountains are separated from other Afromontane regions by lower-elevation areas. Afromontane habitats include gallery forests along mountain stream courses. The gecko species Ancylodactylus alantika is found only in the Atlantika Mountains and the Hosséré Vokré plateau to the east.

The line of mountains of which the Atlantika range is a part were taken as a natural boundary between Nigeria and Cameroon by the colonial powers. The Koma people took refuge in the mountains in the last half of the 19th century, apparently to avoid paying taxes to the colonial government. They remained unnoticed until 1980, when they were found by an Indian schoolteacher who was working for the government.

Alantika means where Allah hasn't yet arrived in the Kanuri language, due to the Koma people keeping their own religions, despite being mostly surrounded by Muslims.
