= Faro (department) =

Coordinates: 8°29′N 13°15′E

- Department
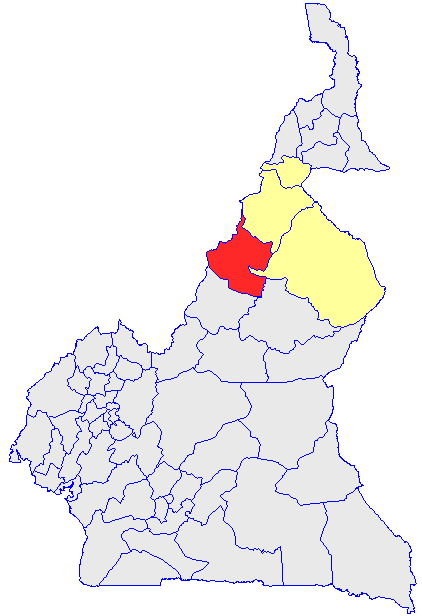
- Department location in Cameroon
- Country: Cameroon
- Province: North Region
- Capital: Poli

Area
  - Total: 11,785 km^{2} (4,550 sq mi)

Population (2001)
  - Total: 81,472
  - Density: 6.9132/km^{2} (17.905/sq mi)
- Time zone: UTC+1 (WAT)

Faro is a department of North Region in Cameroon. The department covers an area of 11,785 km^{2} and as of 2001 had a total population of 81,472. The capital of the department lies at Poli.

== Subdivisions ==
The department is divided administratively into three communes and in turn into villages.

=== Communes ===
- Beka
- Poli (urban)
- Poli (rural)

== See also ==
- Communes of Cameroon
