= Mumuye–Yendang languages =

Mumuye–Yendang
- Geographic distribution: eastern Nigeria
- Linguistic classification: Niger–Congo?: Atlantic–Congo; Savannas; Leko–Nimbari; Mumuye–Yendang
- Subdivisions: Mumuye; Yendang

Language codes
- Glottolog: mumu1249

The Mumuye–Yendang languages are a proposed group of Savanna languages spoken in eastern Nigeria. They were labeled "G5" in Joseph Greenberg's Adamawa language-family proposal.

- Mumuye languages
- Yendang languages

Their unity is not accepted by Güldemann (2018).

Only Mumuye and Yendang proper have more than about 5,000 speakers. Mumuye is the most widely spoken Adamawa language.
