= Leko–Nimbari languages =

Leko–Nimbari
- Chamba–Mumuye
- Geographic distribution: northern Cameroon, eastern Nigeria
- Linguistic classification: Niger–Congo?: Atlantic–Congo; Savanna; greater Gur; Leko–Nimbari
- Subdivisions: Duru; Leko; Mumuye–Yendang; Nimbari

Language codes
- Glottolog: samb1322

The Leko–Nimbari or Chamba–Mumuye languages are a subgroup of the old Adamawa languages family (G2, G4, G5, G12), provisionally now a branch of the Savanna languages. They are spoken in northern Cameroon and eastern Nigeria.

- The four Leko languages include Chamba Leko of the Chamba people, with about 60,000 speakers.
- The dozen Duru languages include Vere, with over 100,000 speakers.
- The dozen Mumuye–Yendang languages include Mumuye, with half a million speakers, and Yendang, with perhaps 100,000.
- Nimbari, with only a hundred speakers, forms its own branch.
