= Horses in Cameroon =

Equine breed in Central Africa

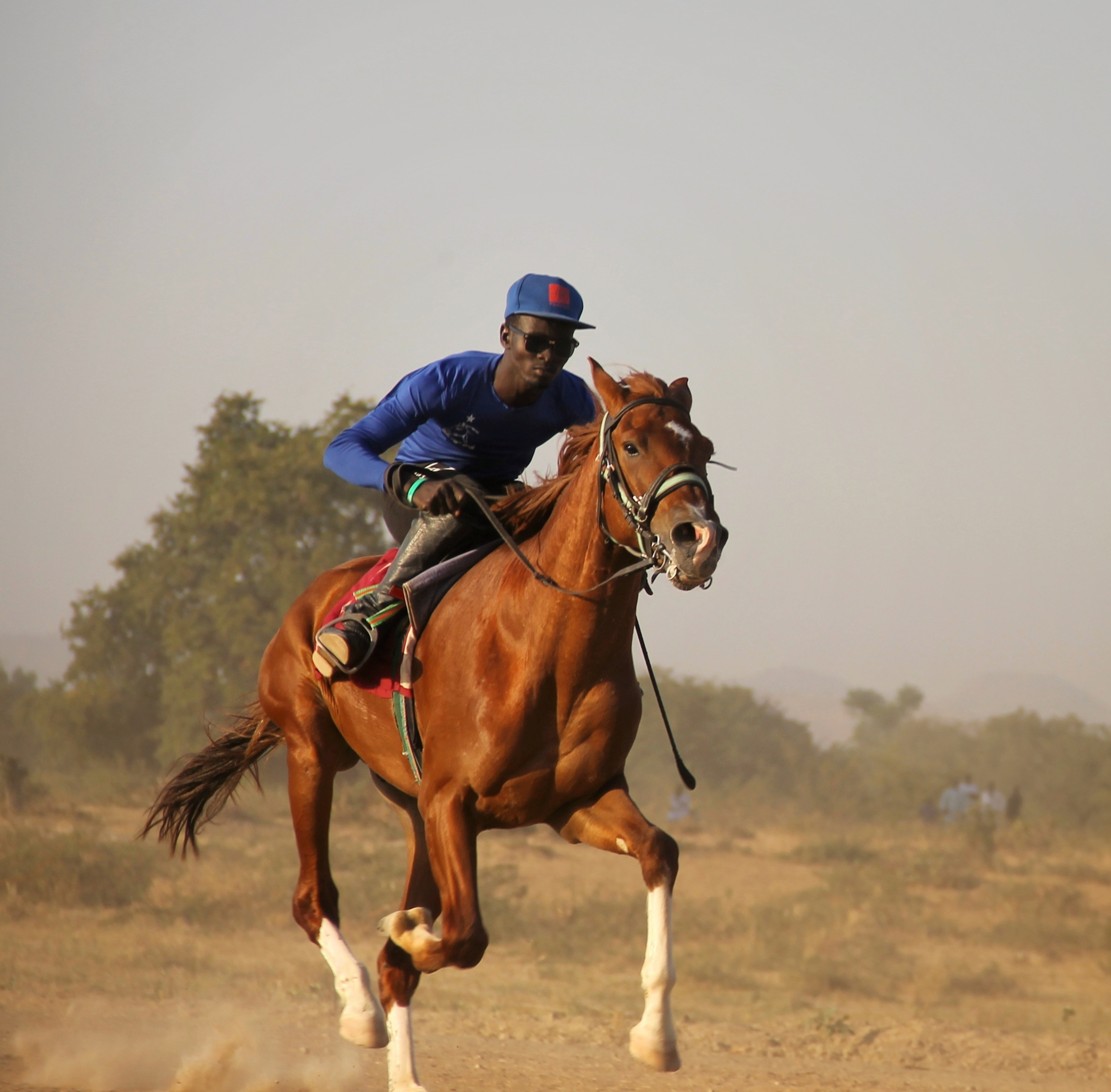
A young jockey at Gashiga

The history of horses in Cameroon is linked above all to the traditional presence of this animal in the northern regions of the country, around Lake Chad from the 16th century, then in Adamawa, as well as in the Garoua and Maroua regions. Traditional equestrian practices in Cameroon, such as horse parades and horse dances (linked to customary ceremonies in the north), have more recently been joined by equestrian activities, under the influence of Western expatriates and investors (supported by the creation of urban riding halls), notably in Yaoundé since the 1990s. The main use of horses in Cameroon is in agriculture and transport fields.

Cameroon bred around 16,000 to 18,000 horses at the beginning of the 21st century, belonging to the Logone, Dongola, Barb, Arabian and Thoroughbred breeds, or more frequently to out-crosses between them. Lack of grazing land is the main obstacle to this type of breeding. Northern Cameroonian culture (particularly that of the Fulani and Kotoko people) gives great importance to horses, a prestigious animal with a reputation for protection. However, customary ceremonies such as the fantasia are threatened with extinction.

== History ==
=== Pre-colonial period ===
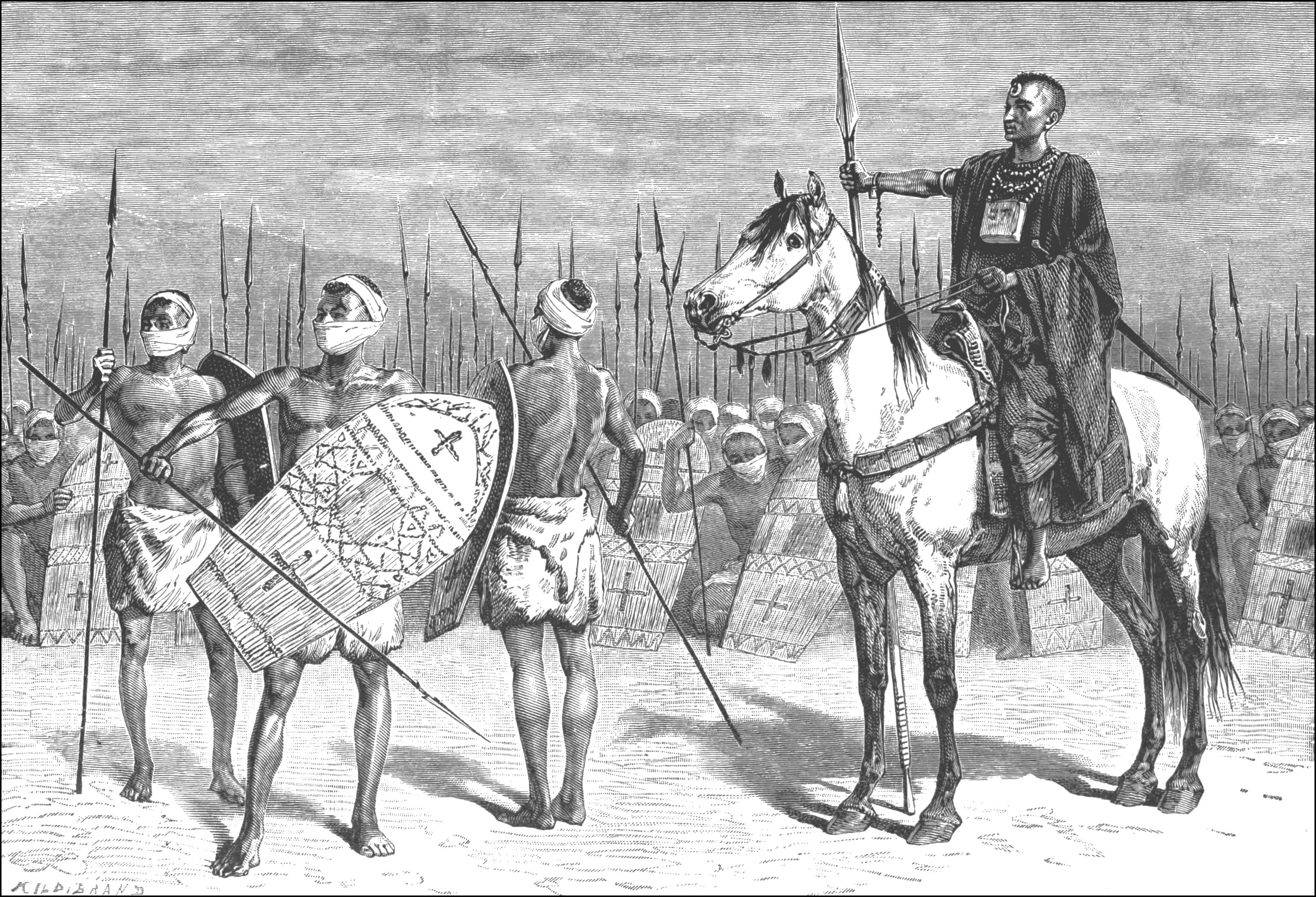
Group of Kanembu warriors (engraving 1892)

As in other regions of sub-Saharan Africa, the presence of horses in present-day Cameroon probably originated in the North, via trans-Saharan migrations aimed at settling or militarily conquering regions with more favorable biotopes. Horses were present in the Lake Chad region around the year 800, as attested by the settlement of the Sayfawa Saharan nomads in Kanem. In the 16th century, Muslim nomads and horse riders also settled in the region. Nonetheless, horse-breeding probably remained rare, due to the presence of the tsetse fly, which led to high horse mortality. However, a few breeds, such as the Logone pony, were able to withstand it thanks to progressive natural selection. The empire of Kanem-Bornu, which extends partly into northern Cameroon, probably made extensive use of horses for military purposes. According to ethnologist Christian Seignobos, the use of a pony resistant to African trypanosomiasis may have declined as early as the 15th century, in favor of the larger Barb and Dongola breeds, in parallel with the Islamization of these royal dynasties.

According to Christian Seignobos, the Logone pony became indigenous to northwest Cameroon, thanks in particular to its trypano resistance. By the 18th century, it was present from the Logone River to Adamawa. Their breeding traditions, based on a hunting and raiding economy, remained intact until the 1980s, although the rituals surrounding the birth and socialization of a pony gradually disintegrated from the late 19th century onwards. The Batas are reputed to have possessed a large cavalry of these ponies, before abandoning the land to concentrate on the river. The Cambas, also horse riders, took the Tikar plain, Bamum country and the Grassfields at the end of the 18th century, before giving way to the Fulani conquest, which stopped further north. Horse-riding tribes (of various ethnicities, including the Mandaras) settled in the Mandara Mountains, and in the 18th and 19th centuries became small predatory chiefdoms, thanks in part to the use of the pony. The Logone pony disappeared from the open plains in the 19th century.

The Yillaga Fulani probably adopted riding on local ponies in North Cameroon in the 18th century to guard their cattle herds, before creating full-fledged military cavalries. The establishment of Muslim Fulani lamidats was accompanied by the purchase of Barb and Dongola stallions from outside the region, and the creation of small stud farms. At the beginning of the 19th century, the chiefs of Bornou and Mandara, aware of the superiority of the horse over Fulani people, attempted to prohibit their sale and possession shortly after the launch of the jihad, under capital punishment. Fulani people changed suppliers, trading horses and slaves with the Hausa people. Owning horses gave them great mobility, and therefore a clear advantage over other populations in the region.

=== The colonial period ===
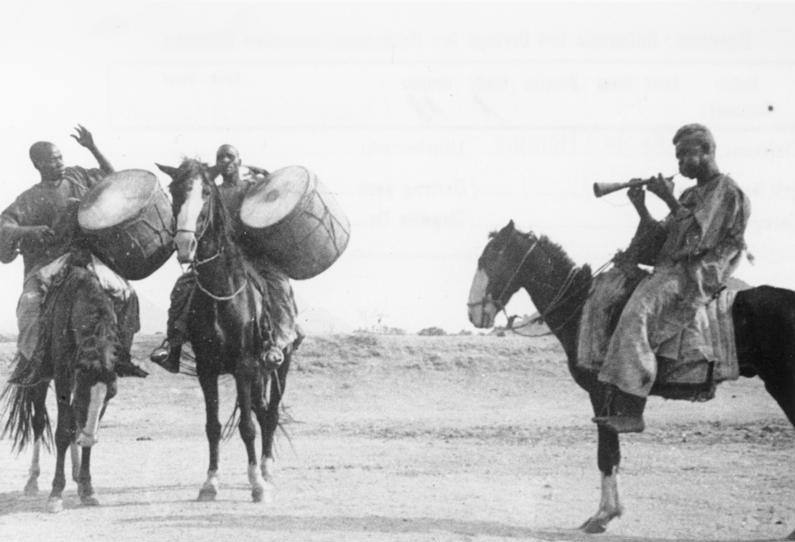
Customary ceremonies in Mora, orchestra of Mandara, from 1911 to 1915

German and French colonizers were quick to show their interest in Cameroon's local horses. The Germans set up a military mare farm in Pitoa; the French also integrated Cameroonian horses into their military columns.

In 1918, Captain J. Lemoigne described the horses of the Choas and Fulani people in northern Cameroon as Dongola crossed with Arabian. In 1926, the French colonial administration in Douala described "a few dozen horses brought by Hausa peddlers or bought in the North for the military administration". About a hundred horses are counted in the Dschang district, owned by the Sultan of Foulbam and customary chiefs. Around 500 horses are counted in the Ngaoundéré region; the report also notes that horse breeding in Cameroon is mainly confined to the Garoua and Maroua regions. In the 1930s, Captain Charles Vallin proposed distributing mounts to mountain Kirdis to encourage traditional chiefs to meet him.

In 1952, shortly before Cameroon's independence, interest in the horse remained strong among the Muslim populations of the north.

=== Since independence ===
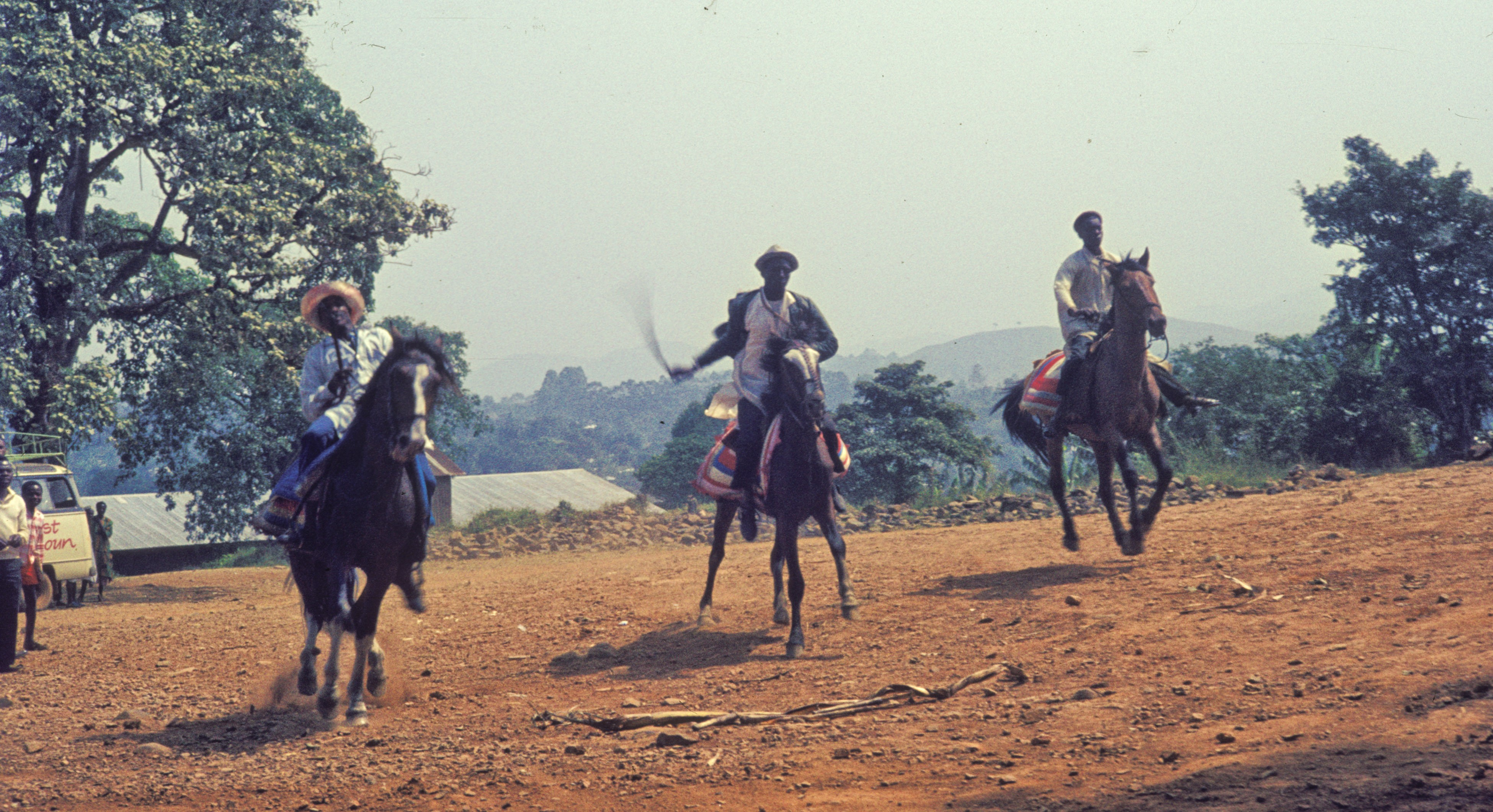
Cameroonian horse riders in 1969

When Cameroon gained independence in January 1960, Ahmadou Ahidjo (Cameroon's first president) organized a fantasia in his native Garoua: the lamibé (traditional chiefs of Fulani origin) and their riders paraded on richly harnessed horses. A mounted presidential escort unit was created in 1963 in Maroua. From then on, there was a major cultural difference between the north of Cameroon, which remained traditional and very close to the African customs of Chad and Nigeria, and the very westernized south.

In 1985 the Barba-Musey of the Gobo region owned between 6 000 and 6 500 ponies. In 1987, a mission of The French Agricultural Research Centre for International Development (CIRAD by its acronym in French) to support the development of saddle horse breeding in Cameroon published a report. Horse-racing betting developed, with the creation of the Pari mutuel urbain camerounais (Cameroon's Pari Mutuel Urbain, PMUC by its acronym in French) in 1992, by two Corsican entrepreneurs close to Charles Pasqua. A memorandum of understanding was signed on 11 November 1993 and a concession contract on 16 June 1994, with the aim of diversifying equestrian activities. The Ministry of Livestock, Fisheries and Animal Industries (MINEPIA by its acronym in French) and the PMUC set up a "Racing and Horse Breeding Fund".

In 1991 the "red cotton disease" (MCR by its acronym in French) in the Bénoué region led to the impoverishment of farmers who, were no longer able to pay for Vaccinations for their draft oxen, gradually replaced them by trypano-resistant ponies, less expensive to buy, or donkeys.

In January 2001 a fantasia was organized in Garoua for the visit of French President Jacques Chirac, with horses that had the French and Cameroonian flags as caparisons and horse riders brandishing assegais. The Cameroon Equestrian Sports Federation (FECASE by its acronym in French) was created in August 2002. In 2006, the cost of buying a horse in Cameroon can range from 100 000 Central African CFA francs to several million.

In the 2010s (particularly in 2015) the Lake Chad region suffered horseback attacks by members of the Boko Haram terrorist group, notably in the Bornou region, with these attacks being fought by the Cameroonian military. In July 2017, the first edition of the Festi Ramadan in Gashiga featured a parade of four groups of warriors on their horses, and a fantasia, with the aim of pacifying the region.

== Usage ==
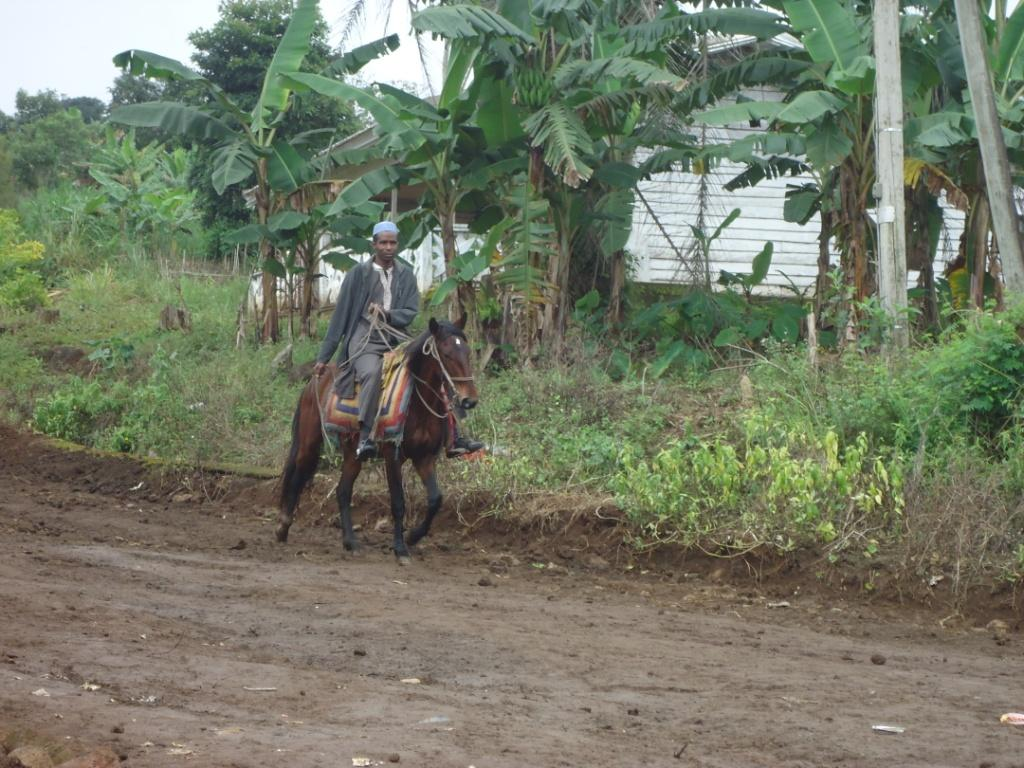
Cameroonian horse riders in Mbouroukou in 2016

Horses are used for work, pleasure, and prestige. Equestrian parades, horseback riding and racing have developed, leading to a parallel development of equestrian professions in urban and rural areas. Equestrian sports are managed by FECASE. The mounted presidential escort unit is responsible for the President's security, escorting important personalities, taking part in military honor ceremonies, maintaining order and guarding public squares.

In three-quarters of cases, the horse tack is purchased locally or handcrafted by its owner, often using recycled materials (tires, plastic, inner tubes, etc.). Farriery is rare, as the horseshoes used are usually imported. In contrast, most owners use the services of a saddler. However, there is no organized training for equestrian professions.

=== Work, transport and agricultural traction ===
The main use of horses in Cameroon is as an aid to work. The majority of horse users are illiterate. Owner-breeders in the north of the country use horses to drive cattle, sheep and goats, and consider horse ownership a sign of wealth or nobility. Horse-drawn vehicles are mainly used in rural areas of the country. Horses are used for agricultural work and water drainage. Cotton cultivation in northern Cameroon has always relied on animal traction: bovine traction from 1950 onwards, asinine traction from 1980 onwards, then horse traction from the 1990s: in 1995, the number of horses used in cotton cultivation was estimated at 2 000, compared with 37 000 pairs of oxen and 14 000 donkeys. Horses are used to transport agricultural inputs and produce from the production phase through to marketing.

In urban areas the use of animal traction, although less frequent, persists due to the cost of motorized vehicles and fuel. Horses are used to transport a variety of goods, such as building materials, as well as people, by carriage or horse-drawn carriage. This personal transport activity provides a livelihood for entire families. In 2006, around 4.7% of Cameroonian horse owners owned a horse-drawn carriage, usually purchased from a local blacksmith.

=== Customary ceremonies ===
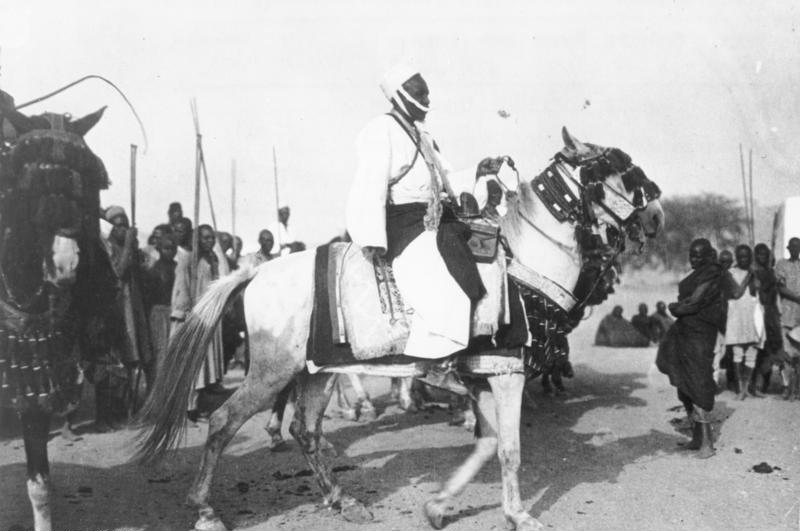
Muslim traditional chief Tukbene Kafim in Mora, between 1911 and 1915

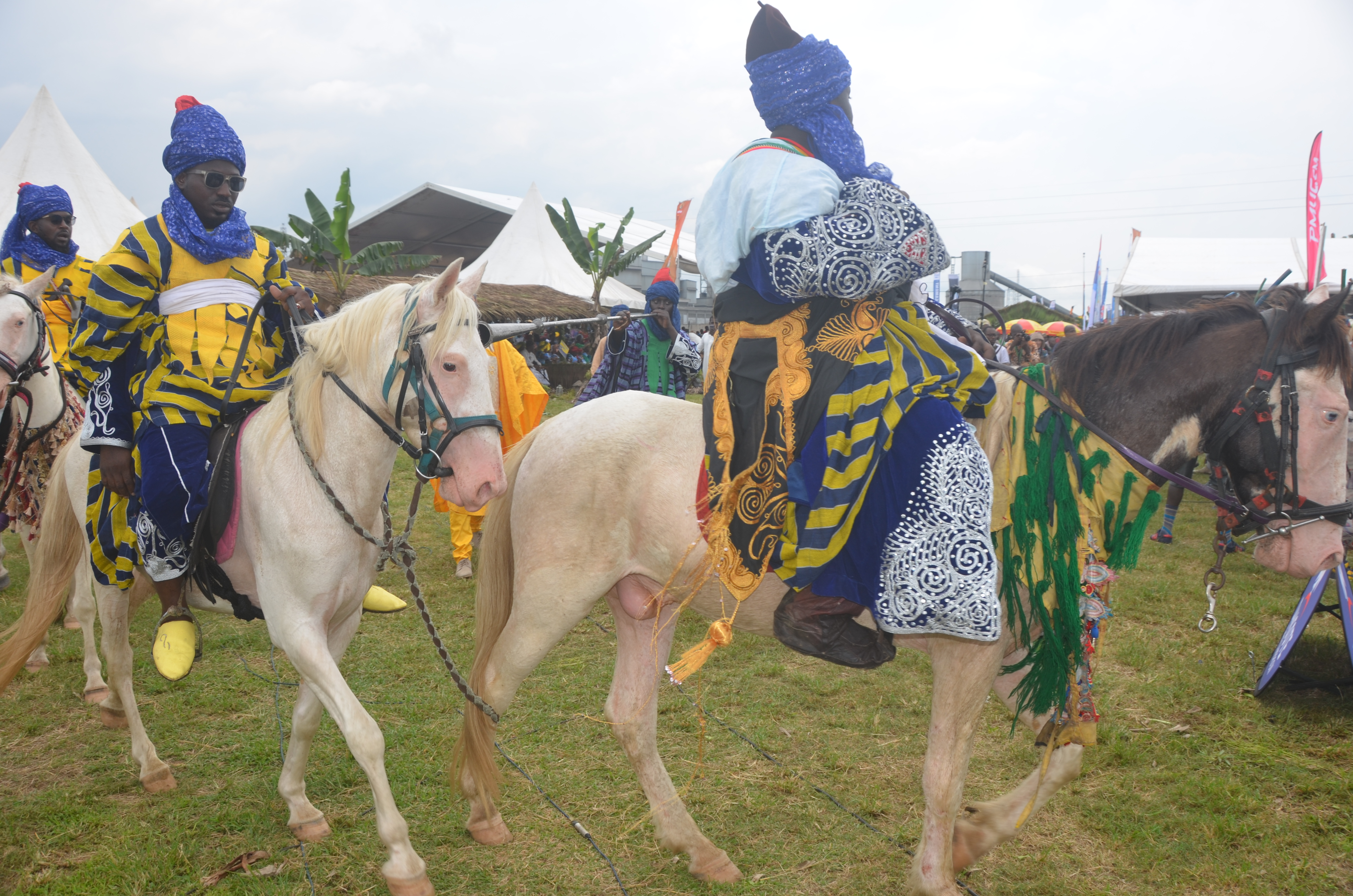
Northern horse riders in Ngondo, Douala, 2019

Fantasias are organized only in the Sahelian part of northern Cameroon, which is much less influenced by European colonization. In this region, horses belong to religious chiefs, who use them as a symbol of their authority. These lamidats are controlled by the lamibé, Muslim customary chiefs, who demonstrate their power by organizing fantasias, on the occasion of festivals or to welcome an important guest. They sing the lamido's praises and enhance their lineage. The lamidat of Demsa is said to be particularly renowned for its fantasias.

“Dance horses", known as djirou, are bred and trained for the sole purpose of performing choreography at customary ceremonies.

=== Riding sport ===
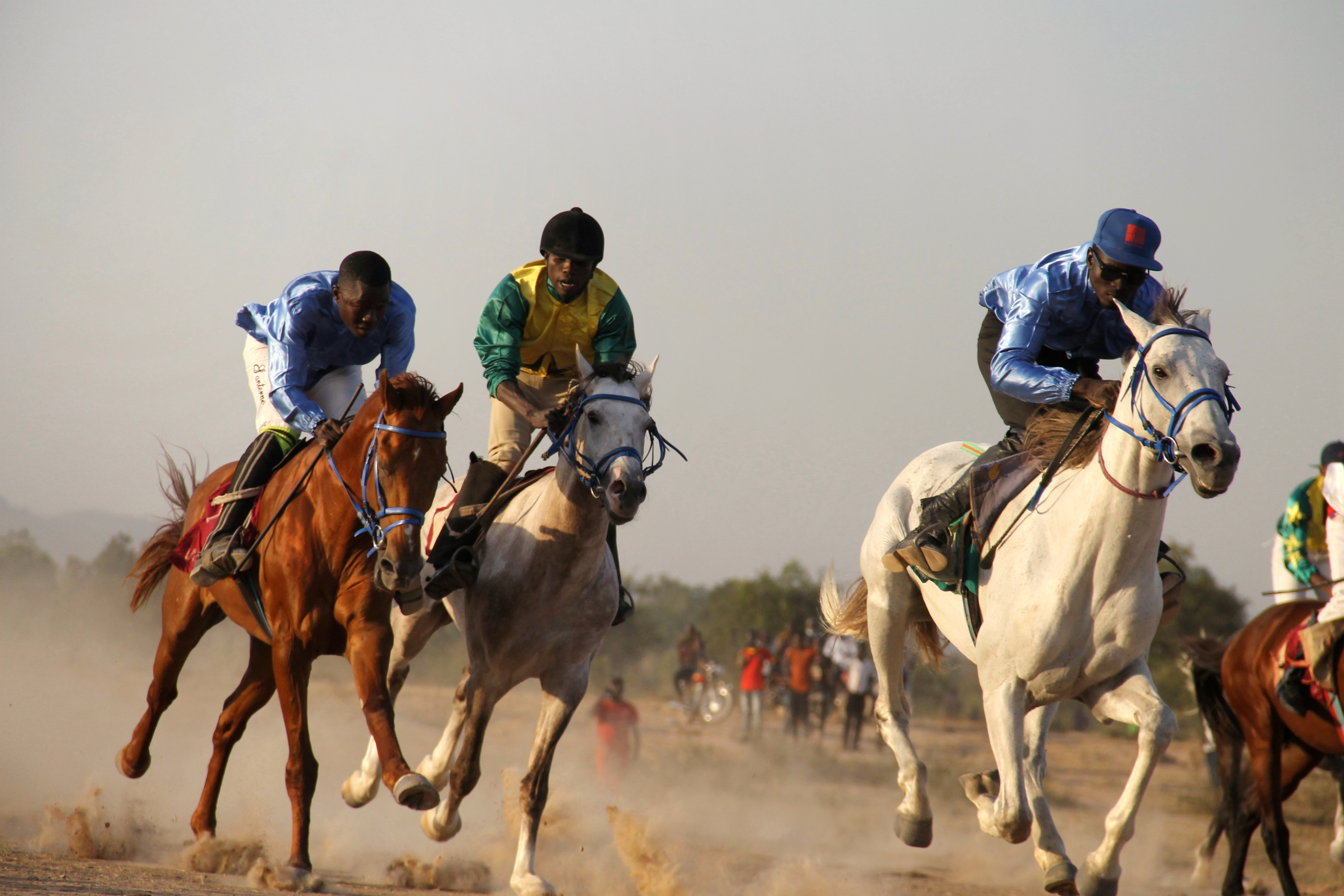
Horse race in Gashiga

The riding sport sector is well developed in Cameroon, and much appreciated by the local population. Horse races are held quarterly in Maroua, Garoua, Koumbo and Kousséri, with competitions on the occasion of Cameroon's national day in the country's northern regions. These races are organized in categories by breed, age and size. Local owners of wealthy horses can enter them in races. It is not uncommon for the same person to be both jockey and horse trainer.

The PMUC manages horse betting throughout Cameroon. It distributes a free newspaper called Le Turf. In 2009, betting in Cameroon was worth 2.9 million Central African CFA francs, the equivalent of 45 million Euros. The PMUC is one of the country's leading private employers. French management of the company has revived controversies linked to the presence of former colonizers and the exploitation of Cameroonian workers by France: during riots in February 2008, 800 PMUC stands were damaged throughout Cameroon. Horse betting has also led to the development of parallel betting networks, and has driven Cameroonian families into debt and ruin.

At the 5th edition of the Fombina Derby International Horse Racing Tournament held in Yola, Nigeria, in 2016, Cameroonian horses qualified for the final. The Coupe du Cameroun des courses hippiques (CAMGALOP) was held on 9 May 2018 in Maroua.

=== Equestrian sports and pleasure riding ===
For a long time sport and pleasure riding were confined to expatriate Europeans; the majority of licenses in this field are still held by Europeans, but since the beginning of the 21st century they have been attracting more and more Cameroonians. There are a number of riding halls in southern Cameroon run by urban Europeans, including two in Yaoundé in 2006, and one in Bamenda in the same year. All are affiliated to FECASE. Two-thirds were created between 1990 and 2000, and are publicly owned. They generally hold out-crossed horses of foreign origin, with an average of 18 horses. These riding halls usually have staff trained in the horse trade in France, or "on the job" in Cameroon. They offer dressage, show jumping, equestrian shows and eventing.

== Breeding ==
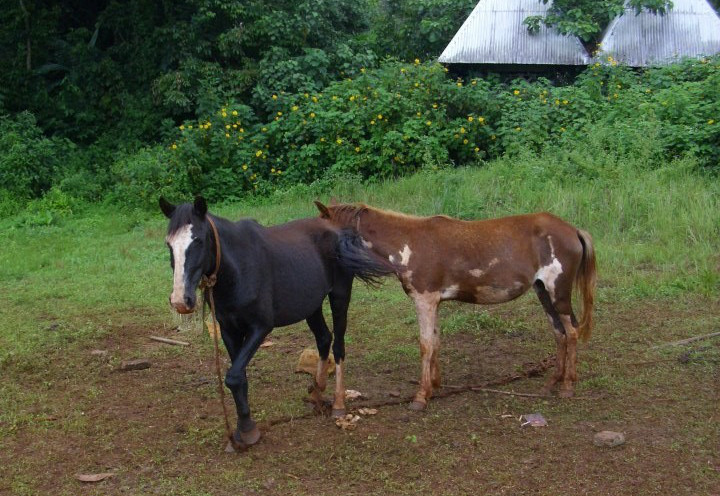
Local horses (probably Dongola) at Batoufam

According to the Delachaux guide, in 2014 the horse population in Cameroon was around 16 000. According to Mohamadou's veterinary thesis, there were a total of 18 146 horses in 2001 and 2002, with the largest concentrations in the Far North, North-West and Adamawa regions. Horse breeding (as well as other animal husbandry) is traditional throughout the Lake Chad region. The Fulani people breed horses for prestige riding, with almost all male horses bred under the control of traditional chiefdoms (lamibé).

Around 53% of Cameroonian horse owners are also breeders, the rest being traders, civil servants, notables or drivers. And, 86% of these animals are traditionally bred. Half of Cameroonian horse owners own fewer than five animals, and 18.6% own more than 15. Around half of horse owners feed their animals with fodder (peanut stover, millet bran or sorghum), while the other half let their animals graze and supplement them with minerals as needed. Horse feed is purchased from Sodecoton or local markets, at an average cost (in 2006) of 150 francs per kilo. Management of horse reproduction is rare. Horses are frequently (in half the cases) passed down through family inheritance. It is also common to call on the services of a veterinary assistant or stable manager to manage a breeding operation.

The expansion of breeding is limited by the lack of pasture and water, as well as the presence of the tsetse fly. The food constraint is the main factor limiting horse breeding according to the owners consulted, with other constraints lying in the difficulties of watering, care, management of reproduction and management of equestrian activities by official organizations. The south of the country, with its equatorial climate, is home to tsetse flies, which are detrimental to horse breeding. Northern Cameroon, with its tropical climate, offers savannas and steppes. In these rural areas, mares are left to roam freely around villages, and presented to local stallions, tethered near their owner's tent or hunt, when they come into heat. Foals are born during the wintering period, kept in the pasture with their mothers and brought in at night. They are generally fat after the rainy season, then lose weight during the dry season due to the lack of grazing land, exacerbated by bush fires.

Modern stables are found mainly in the Yaoundé and Douala regions, and generally keep more fragile horses of out-crossed breeds.

=== Types of horses bred ===
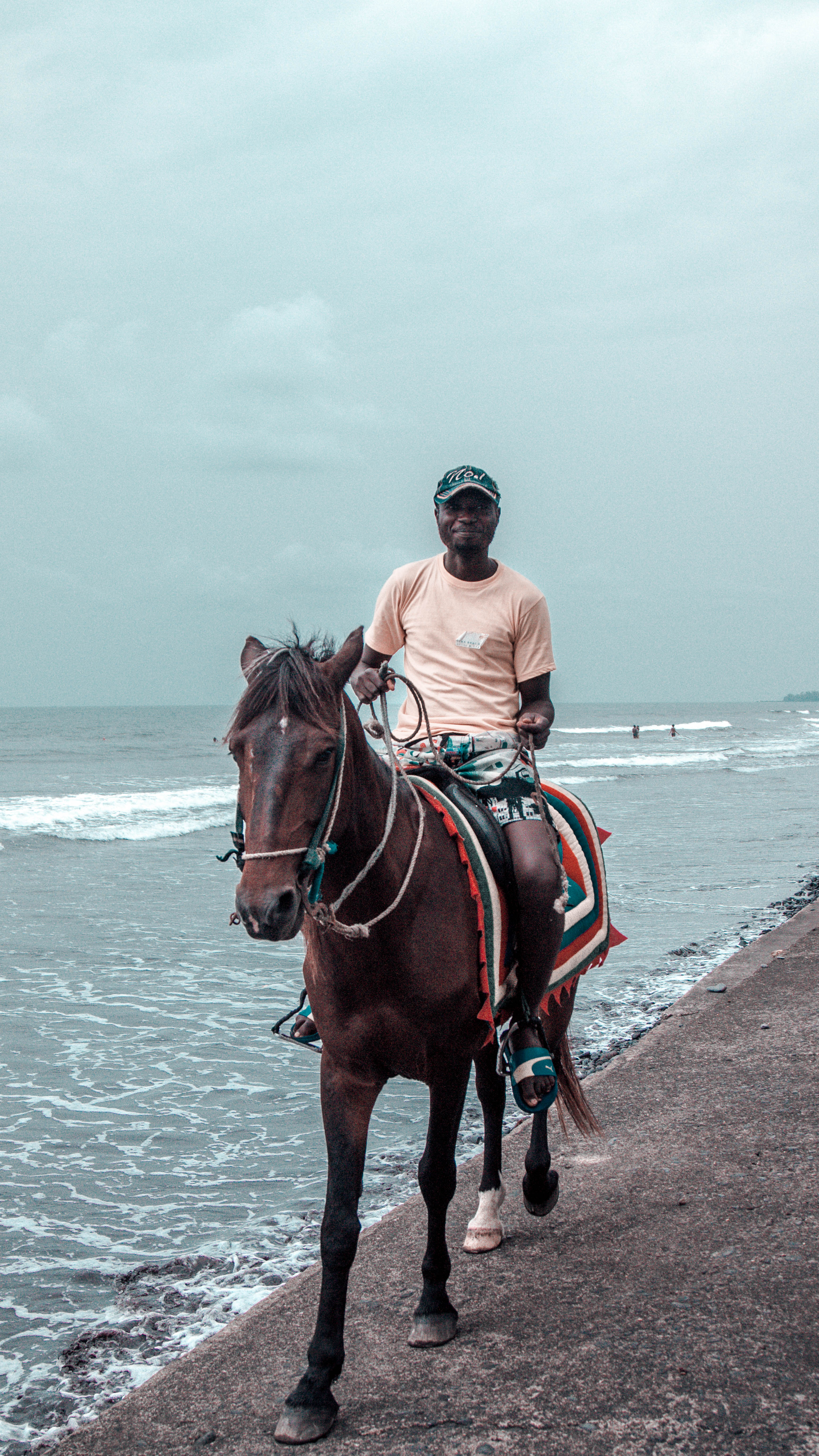
Cameroonian horse and rider on the Atlantic coast (2018)

The DAD-IS database provides no information on the types of horses bred in Cameroon. In 1926, two distinct types were described by the colonial administration. The first one was the "plains horse", measuring 1.40 m to 1.56 m, derived from the Arabian and the Barb. While the second one was the "mountain horse" or Kiridi (which Seignobos calls the "Logone pony"), not exceeding 1.30 m, very robust, resistant and courageous, useful for traveling on mountain trails. The colonial administration also cites horses "of very large size and very beautiful forms [...] of high price, [and which] come from the Manga", in Chad. According to Mohamadou's veterinary thesis (2007), three main types of horse are now bred: the "racing" type, the "saddle" type and the "heavy" type, for horse meat.

It's difficult to define Cameroon's horse breeds, as they have been out-crossed extensively. One breed unique to Cameroon is the Logone pony, which, as its name suggests, originates from the Logone and Wandala river region, and survives in tsetse fly-infested areas. Other breeds include the Barb, Arab-Barb, Anglo-Arab, Arabian, Thoroughbred and various crosses between imported and local breeds. Local breeds account for 69.8% of the national herd. Imported horses come mainly from Chad, more rarely from Nigeria and Sudan. These imports are encouraged by a local belief that horses from Nigeria and Chad are faster.

On its plateau, Mount Manengouba is home to a group of wild horses preserved thanks to a favorable microclimate, perhaps descended from colonial troop horses abandoned, probably by Germans. French writer and editor Jean-Louis Gouraud discovered their presence in November 1988, but was unable to track them down on a second trip in late 2001.

=== Horse meat ===
The hypophagia is rare in Cameroon, due to religious taboos, contrary customs and the absence of specialized slaughterhouses. However, it has developed, particularly in the Mount Manengouba region. Horse intestines have a good reputation, and the meat (e.g., burned forelimbs) is said to have medicinal properties. Self-consumption of horse meat has become a rare incentive to breed this animal.

=== Diseases and parasites ===
Endemic diseases are present and have a detrimental effect on breeding. However, African horse sickness and equine influenza are tending to disappear. The most common diseases affecting livestock are botulism, tetanus, brucellosis, ulcerative lymphangitis, anthrax and various forms of salmonellosis. Parasites are also common, in particular ascariasis, strongylosis, habronemosis, oxyurosis, ticks, mange, trypanosomiasis and babesiosis. Other ailments of Cameroonian horses are shared with horses bred in other countries, notably colic, foot ailments and respiratory disease.

Animal drugs are widely available in the country, although vaccine shortages are frequent and training in equine medicine is sometimes inadequate. Around 66% of equine veterinary consultations in Cameroon concern tetanus and colic. Recourse to a veterinarian is highly dependent on the value of the horse and the means of its owner; recourse to traditional African medicine, although declining, remains common in isolated regions.

The fight against African trypanosomiasis (sleeping sickness) has been an area of investment since the beginning of the 20th century, with certain pastures in the Vina, Faro-et-Déo and Bénoué rivers having been cleared of tsetse fly and tabanidae to help livestock breeders in their activities. Cameroon's economic crisis in the 1980s put a stop to the major efforts to control these insects.

== Culture ==
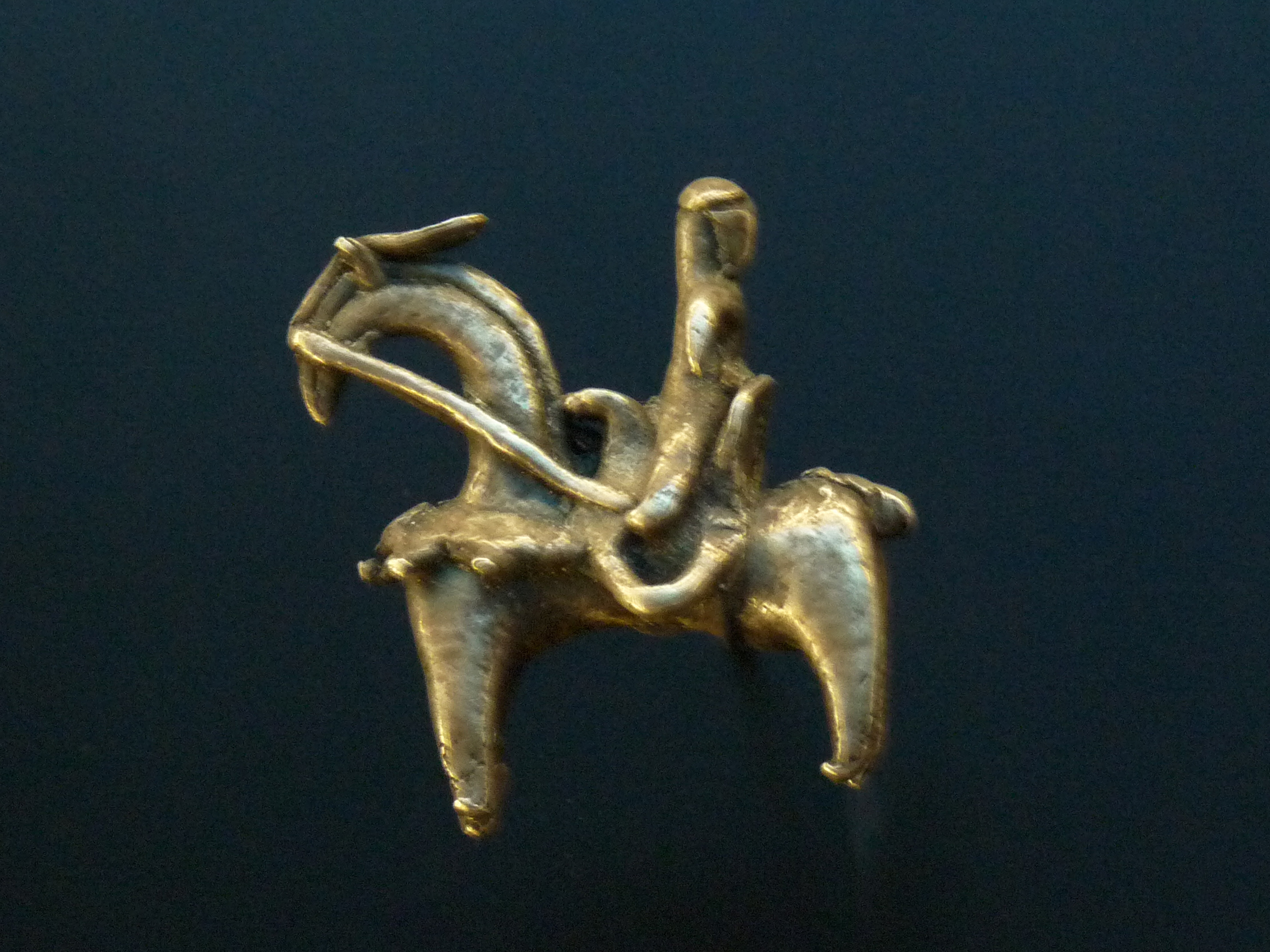
Bijou Kotoko at the musée du quai Branly

Horses are of great importance in traditional Cameroonian societies, particularly among the Fulani, who consider them to be prestigious animals. Religious chiefs in the north of the country attribute certain qualities to certain coats, in particular the chestnut with four markings and the light gray. Musgum of Pouss and Guirvidig people call the pony ‘atongo’ (from Tonggoy, meaning pre-Massa driven south). While Kosa and Wasa people call it ‘Konkos’ (borrowing the name from Kanouri language). The horse has also left its mark on toponymy, with northern Cameroon boasting a large number of cevetplis (horse paths), notably in Dimeo, Zidim and Waza; according to Christian Seignobos, these paths were designed to enable a rider to penetrate to the proximity of the chief's concession without dismounting.

Among Grassland populations, the horse's tail was traditionally used to prepare protective talismans for military chiefs sent into conflict. Bronze, tin, silver, copper or iron talismans called Putchu Guinadji ("horses of madness"), traditionally made in Maroua and depicting small horse riders, are still used (in 2018) as a remedy against possession and insanity by the Kotokos, Fulanis, Guizigas, Kanuris, Mafas and Massas.

In 1999 ethnologist Christian Seignobos published an investigation into the relationship between the Moussey of Gobo and their ponies, whom they consider equal to human beings (asiya ko su wurnn), notably banning hippophagy. When they die, these ponies are mourned as if they were people. They are said to have prescience and the ability to see in the dark thanks to their chestnuts (nicknamed hidi ko kuluma, or "horse's eyes"). Debts and marriage dowries are settled in ponies; furthermore, women are neither allowed to ride nor own a horse, as they are considered "man's wealth" in the same way as ponies. The most famous ponies are called Kuluma, and are the exclusive property of the head of the family: they are given a name, a lot of attention, and are the focus of rituals, the most important of which is the first cutting of their mane. The death of a Kuluma sometimes triggers mourning drums; these ponies were commonly buried until the 1950s. The birth of a foal is accompanied by a series of rites, including the placement of the broodmare's placenta under a jujube tree, to protect the foal from evil spirits. In the 1990s, the Moussey began to use their ponies as agricultural draft animals, to ensure their subsistence.

Horse-riding people still exist (in 1995) in the Bibemi region. However, equestrian traditions are in decline. According to Jean-Louis Gouraud, the equestrian heritage of sub-Saharan Africa, with its customary equestrian ceremonies in Cameroon and elsewhere, is threatened with extinction.

== Bibliography ==
- Alkaissou, Hamadjam (2009). Contribution à l'étude de la trypanosome équine au Cameroun (in French). Université Cheikh Anta Diop.
- Bernard, Philippe (2009). Le Cameroun a la fièvre du cheval. Le Monde.fr (in French). Le Monde.
- Boukar, Lamine; Poulain, J. F.; Faure, Guy (1997). Agricultures des savanes du Nord-Cameroun : vers un développement solidaire des savanes d'Afrique centrale : actes de l'atelier d'échange, 25–29 novembre 1996, Garoua, Cameroun (in French). CIRAD. ISBN 2876142953.
- De Garine, Igor (1975). Contribution à l'ethnozoologie du cheval chez les Moussey (Tchad et Cameroun) (in French). Institut international d'ethnosciences.
- Gouraud, Jean-Louis (2002). L'Afrique par monts et par chevaux (in French). Éditions Belin. ISBN 2-7011-3418-8.
- Mohamadou (2007). Contribution à l'identification des métiers du cheval au Cameroun (in French). Université Cheikh Anta Diop.
- Njeuma, M. Z. (1989). Histoire du Cameroun (XIXe-début XXe s.). Racines du présent (in French). Éditions de l'Harmattan. ISBN 2738400167.
- Porter, Valerie; Alderson, Lawrence; Hall, Stephen; Sponenberg, Dan (2016). Mason's World Encyclopedia of Livestock Breeds and Breeding (6th ed.). CAB International. ISBN 978-1-84593-466-8.
- Rousseau, Élise (2014). Tous les chevaux du monde (in French). Delachaux et Niestlé. ISBN 978-2-603-01865-1.
- Seignobos, Christian (1995). "Les poneys du Logone à l'Adamawa, du XVIIIe siècle à nos jours". Cavalieri dell'Africa: storia, iconografia, simbolismo : atti del ciclo di incontri : organizzato dal Centro studi archeologia africana di Milano, febbraio-giugno 1994 (in French). Centro studi archeologia africana.
- Seignobos, Christian (1999). "Élevage social du poney musey – Région de Gobo, Nord-Cameroun" (PDF). L'homme et l'animal dans le bassin du lac Tchad. Paris: IRD. pp. 394–407. ISBN 2-7099-1436-0..
- Vall, Éric (1998). Capacités de travail du zébu, de l'âne et du cheval au Nord-Cameroun. Concept d'adéquation du couple animal-outil (in French). Vol. 47. Annales de zootechnie.
