= Duli–Gewe language =

Extinct Savannas language of Cameroon

Duli-Gewe
- Region: northern Cameroon
- Extinct: Latter half of the 20th century
- Language family: Niger–Congo?: Atlantic–Congo; Savannas; (unclassified); Duli-Gewe

Language codes
- ISO 639-3: duz – inclusive code Individual code: guv – Gey (retired)
- Glottolog: duli1241 Duli-Gewe geya1234 Gey (retired)

Duli (Gewe, Gueve, Gey) is an extinct Adamawa language of northern Cameroon.

== Classification ==
Although Boyd (1989:184) had classified Duli as one of the Duru languages, Kleinewillinghöfer finds no evidence of it being a Duru language and treats it as a separate group within the Adamawa–Gur continuum.

== Dialects ==
Blench (2004) links Duli to the extinct Gewe (Gey) language; Glottolog states that Gey is undemonstrated as a distinct language, and the ISO 639 code for Gewe was retired in 2016. Duli and Gewe (Gey) were closely related language varieties, and were probably dialects of the same language according to Kleinewillinghöfer (2015). They were spoken around the confluence of the Benue and Mayo-Kebbi Rivers, and are documented by a word list in Strümpell (1922/23).

== Geographical distribution ==
Today, the Gey, who number about a 1,000 people in the east of Pitoa (Pitoa commune, Bénoué department, North Region), according to the ORSTOM population map of 1964. SIL (1982) estimates the ethnic population as 1,900. The Gey now recognize the Lamido of Tchéboa as their ruler, and they currently speak only Fulfulde.

Duli is spoken near Pitoa (Pitoa commune) and Garoua (Bénoué department, North Region). Eldridge Mohammadou also notes that only a few Duli words had been collected. As a result, the language is essentially undocumented.

== Vocabulary ==
=== Numerals ===
Duli–Gewe numerals
Numeral	Duli–Gewe
1	hira, hita
2	sik
3	ba
4	fwon, mofon
5	nakam, nak(k)ani
6	naani, naa tanu, na tadiu
7	naasik, nar gasik
8	naaba, nar gabia, nar gasba
9	naafoon, nar ga(s) fwon
10	bo
20	byeg
