= Dembo =

Dembo could refer to:

== People ==
- Dembo (surname), a list of people with the surname

== Places ==
- Dembo, Democratic Republic of the Congo, a commune in Kongo-Central Province, DRC
- Dembo, Cameroon, a town in North Region, Cameroon
- Dembo, Chad, a sub-prefecture in Madoul Region, Chad
