= Ministry of Public Service and Administrative Reforms (Cameroon) =

Government ministry of Cameroon responsible for the civil service

- Ministère de la Fonction publique et de la Réforme administrative

Agency overview
- Jurisdiction: Government of Cameroon
- Headquarters: Yaoundé
- Minister responsible: Joseph Le, Minister of Public Service and Administrative Reforms
- Website: www.minfopra.gov.cm

The Ministry of Public Service and Administrative Reforms (Ministère de la Fonction publique et de la Réforme administrative), known by its French acronym MINFOPRA, is the government department of Cameroon responsible for managing the civil service and for leading the modernisation and reform of the public administration. The ministry has been headed by Joseph Le since 2018.

== Functions and responsibilities ==
MINFOPRA is responsible for the recruitment, career management, and conditions of service of state employees across Cameroon's public administration. The ministry oversees competitive examinations for civil service recruitment, manages personnel files, and administers the government payroll system.

The ministry also leads initiatives to modernise public administration through administrative reforms and the implementation of digital governance tools.

== Organization ==
The ministry is organised into several directorates and departments responsible for different aspects of civil service management, including human resources, administrative reform, training, and digital transformation. The ministry operates under Decree No. 94/160 of 16 August 1994, which established its organisational framework.

== Recent developments ==
=== Digitalization initiatives ===
In 2024, MINFOPRA began deploying a digitised civil-service human-resources and payroll system. The deployment includes biometric verification of civil servants to address payroll fraud and eliminate ghost workers from the government payroll.

The ministry has also launched an e-governance group to accelerate the digitisation of public archives and improve service delivery. The ministry regularly organises examinations for recruitment into the public service.

MINFOPRA has conducted extensive payroll audits to identify irregularities and remove ineligible employees from the civil service payroll. In 2024, the ministry announced the removal of 1,172 additional civil servants following audit investigations. The ministry has also taken disciplinary action against civil servants for poor performance and slow work, as part of broader efforts to improve public service efficiency.

== See also ==
- Government of Cameroon
- Civil service
- List of ministries of Cameroon
