= Ngong =

Ngong may refer to:

- Ngong, Cameroon, a town
- Ngong, Kenya, a town
  - Roman Catholic Diocese of Ngong
- Ngong (language), spoken in Cameroon

== See also ==
- Ngong Hills, in Kenya
- Ngong Ping, in Hong Kong
