= Goggo Addi =

Cameroonian storyteller

- Born: 1911
- Died: 1999 (aged 87–88)
- Occupation: Storyteller

Goggo Addi (c. 1911– November 1999) was a Cameroonian storyteller who performed in the Fula language. She hosted storytelling events in the country for several decades, and from 1985 to 1989 she consented to have her stories recorded and transcribed by the researcher Ursula Baumgardt, contributing significantly to perpetuating this West African oral tradition.

== Biography ==
Goggo Addi was born in 1911 or perhaps 1912 in Bibemi, in northern Cameroon, during a period of expanding German colonization and increasing resistance to this incursion. Her father was a wealthy Muslim Fulani merchant, who had four wives. In 1914, her family left Bibemi for the city of Garoua, where her father died two years later. That year, the city was taken over from the Germans by the French. Addi stayed there with her mother, who remarried, and her siblings, but their financial situation became increasingly difficult.

Addi was made to enter a forced marriage, but she left her first husband and married, by choice, the son of one of her father's friends. However, he turned out to be violently abusive, and she obtained authorization from a moodibbo, an Islamic religious leader, to divorce him. She returned to settle in her birthplace of Bibemi, where she acquired a reputation as a storyteller, hosting gatherings of local women and children.

Fiercely independent, Addi remarried six more times. She had no children, though she experienced two stillbirths.

In 1985, family members put her in contact with Ursula Baumgardt, a professor at the Institut national des langues et civilisations orientales and a member of a research project on sub-Saharan African languages and cultures at the French National Centre for Scientific Research. The two women worked together until 1989 to record and transcribe Addi's stories, with Baumgardt attending her evening performances and conducting interviews. They remained in touch, meeting again in 1993 and 1995.

Addi died in Garoua, where she had returned to live in her later years, in November 1999.

== Work ==
Goggo Addi's stories were noteworthy not only as tools for passing down cultural heritage but also as products of individual creativity. In her work, she threaded together multiple characters and narrative voices to form an imaginary universe that she constructed herself. She would adjust each line in the story depending on the audience for each performance. Among the 70 stories that Baumgardt collected, some are fictional, often referred to as "mensonges" or "lies," and some are more closely based in reality.

Her repertoire included both original stories and new versions of traditional stories, classics from both the Fulani repertoire and across West Africa, including "The Boy and the Lion Cub," "The Butter Girl," "The Girl Without Hands," and "The Bird That Is Never Satisfied." Another example of a typical tale told by Addi is "The Difficult Girl," which tells of a girl who demands to choose her own husband. The subversive subject matter of this story allowed her to address such themes as parent-child relationships, exogamy, the fight against traditional authority, family identity, blood allegiance versus other allegiances, etc. Her work also on occasion tackled such themes as a mother-witch attacking her daughter or a woman who saves her husband who has gone to war.
