= Youssoufa Daoua =

Cameroonian politician

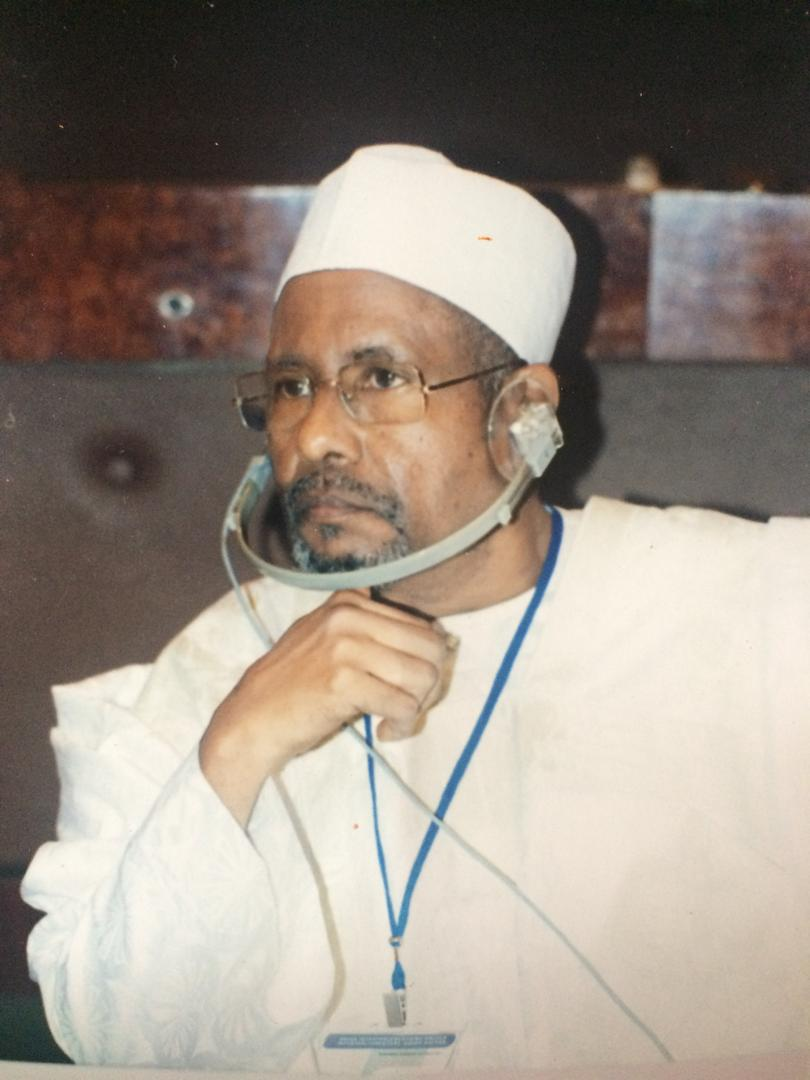

Senator
- In office 2013–2015

Mayor
- In office 2007–2013

Personal details
- Born: september 1947 Garoua, Cameroon
- Died: 11 October 2015 (aged 68)
- Party: CPDM
- Profession: finance collector

Youssoufa Daoua was born on September 1947 in Garoua, in the North Region of Cameroon, and died in 2015. He was a Fulani Cameroonian politician who served in a wide array of governmental positions, ranging from Sub-Prefect and Tax Inspector to elected offices such as Deputy in the National Assembly, Mayor of Garoua I, and Senator.

== Education and early career ==
He pursued his early education in Garoua, where he completed primary and secondary schooling.

After passing the competitive entry exam for the National School of Administration and Magistracy (ENAM) in 1970, he completed his studies in 1973, earning a diploma from the Cycle B track, which qualified him as a Financial Controller (Taxes). He initially started working in financial management, but his career path soon shifted to territorial governance, where he was subsequently appointed to various high-level positions.

== Career ==
He began his career in finance, but soon shifted gears to local government, working his way up the ranks from assistant district head in Kaélé and Tcholliré (1973-1975) to district head (sub-prefect) in Toubouro and Figuil (1976-1977). Later, as sub-prefect of Mayo-Danay in the late 1970s, he supervised the local implementation of the significant Maga Lake construction project. This was followed by a sub-prefect role in Mora in the early 1980s. His tenure in local government was defined by his disciplined approach, engagement with the community, and focus on maintaining public order, qualities paving the way for his entry into national politics.

== Political career ==
youssoufa Daoua's political career began with his election as a deputy for the North in 1983 under the banner of the then-ruling Cameroon National Union (UNC). He served on the Finance Committee and worked as a financial controller. Re-elected in 1988 with the Cameroon People's Democratic Movement (RDPC), he continued in the same role. Later, he strengthened his regional influence by becoming president of the RDPC Bénoué Ouest section in 1996. From 2000 to 2003, he represented the government on the board of Cameroon Airlines (CAMAIR). In 2002, he was re-elected as a deputy for the North, this time chairing the Committee on Economic Affairs, Planning, and Regional Development, and also became president of the RDPC Bénoué Centre I section.

=== Local functions ===
He served as a local official, holding the positions of Municipal Councilor and Mayor of Garoua I from his election in 2007 until he was elected to the Senate. Before this, in 2006, he was appointed to the National Commission on Human Rights and Freedoms (CNDHL) by presidential decree, representing the National Assembly. Later, in 2011, he became a member of the central committee of the CPDM.

=== Senate and later life ===
Leading the charge for the Cameroon People's Democratic Movement (CPDM) in the North region, he successfully headed their ticket during Cameroon's inaugural senatorial elections in 2013. This victory secured his position as a senator and elevated him to the chairmanship of the Senate's Economic Commission during its foundational term. His tenure was cut short when he died in Garoua on October 11, 2015, while still actively serving as the senator for the North.
