= List of ministries of Cameroon =

The government ministries of Cameroon were defined by Decree number 2004/320 of December 8, 2004. The Cameroon government consists of the following ministries:

- Ministry of Culture
- Ministry of Commerce
- Ministry of Communication
- Ministry of Defense
- Ministry of Housing and Urban Development
- Ministry of Finance
- Ministry of Basic Education
- Ministry of Livestock Fisheries and Animal Industries
- Ministry of Employment and Vocational Training
- Ministry of Energy and Water Resources
- Ministry Of Secondary Education
- Ministry of Higher education
- Ministry of Environment and Nature Protection in Cameroon
- Ministry of Public Service and Administrative Reforms
- Ministry of Forestry and Wildlife
- Ministry of Industry, Mines and Technological Development
- Ministry of Youth Affairs and Civic Education
- Ministry of Economy, Planning and Regional Development
- Ministry of Small and Medium-sized Enterprises, Social Economy and Handicrafts
- Ministry of Posts and Telecommunications
- Ministry of Women's Empowerment and the Family
- Ministry of Scientific Research and Innovation
- Ministry of External Relations
- Ministry of Public Health
- Ministry of Sports and Physical Education
- Ministry of Tourism
- Ministry of Transport
- Ministry of Labor and Social Security
- Ministry of Public Works
- Ministry of Justice
- Ministry of Territorial Administration
- Ministry of Decentralisation and Local Development
