= Gautier Bello =

Cameroonian footballer

Gauthier Bello
Personal information
- Full name: Gauthier Bello
- Date of birth: April 9, 1983 (age 43)
- Place of birth: Garoua, Cameroon
- Height: 1.83 m (6 ft 0 in)
- Position: Goalkeeper

Youth career
- 1998–2001: Cotonsport Garoua

Senior career*
Years	Team	Apps	(Gls)
2002–2007	Cotonsport Garoua	192	(0)
2008–2009	Renacimiento FC	27	(0)
2009–2011	US Douala	17	(0)

International career
1998–2000	Cameroon	9	(0)
- * Club domestic league appearances and goals

Gautier Bello (born April 9, 1983 in Garoua) is a Cameroonian footballer.

== Club career ==
Bello began his football career Cotonsport Garoua, and played an important role in the club's 2004 domestic-double-winning squad, making important saves in the Cameroon Cup final. He left Cotonsport in January 2008 and moved to Equatorial Guinea club Renacimiento FC. After two season in the Equatoguinean Premier League left Renacimiento FC and returned to Cameroon who signed with US Douala.

== See also ==
- Football in Cameroon
- List of football clubs in Cameroon
