= Bénoué =

- Department
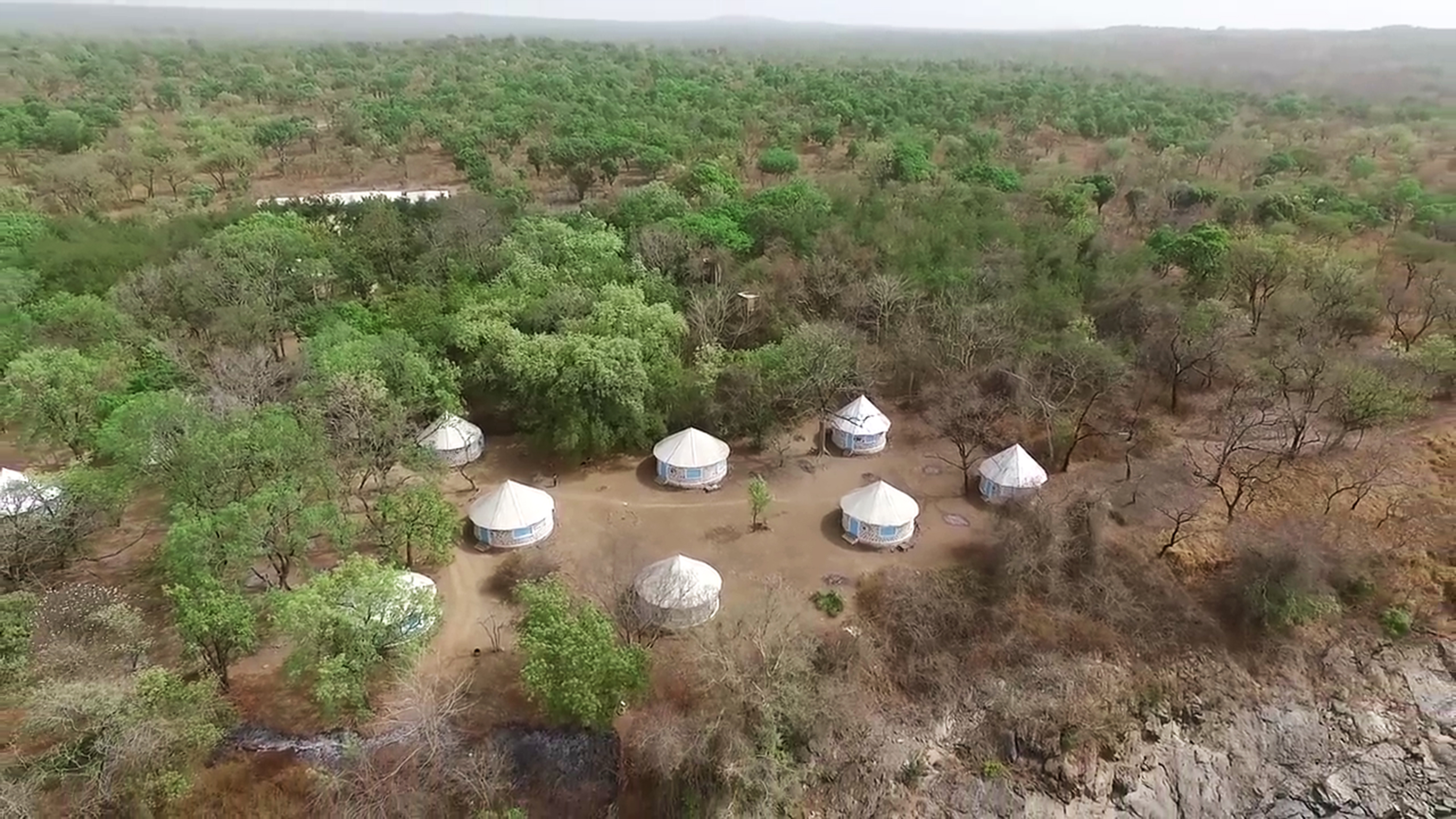
- Drone view of Bénoué

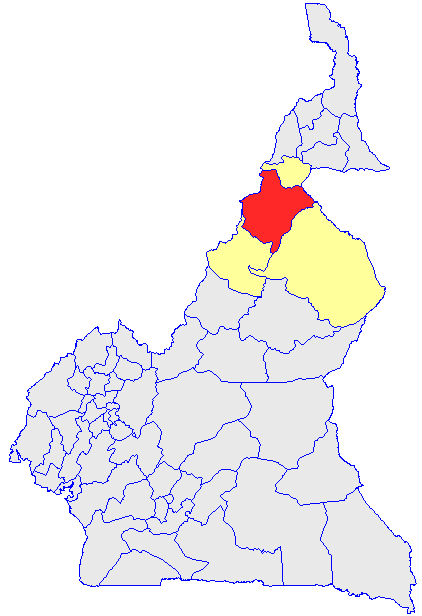
- Department location in Cameroon
- Country: Cameroon
- Province: North Province
- Capital: Garoua

Government
  - Governor: Ahmidou Biriou
  - Deputy Governor: Bassirou Oumarou

Area
  - Total: 13,614 km^{2} (5,256 sq mi)

Population (2005)
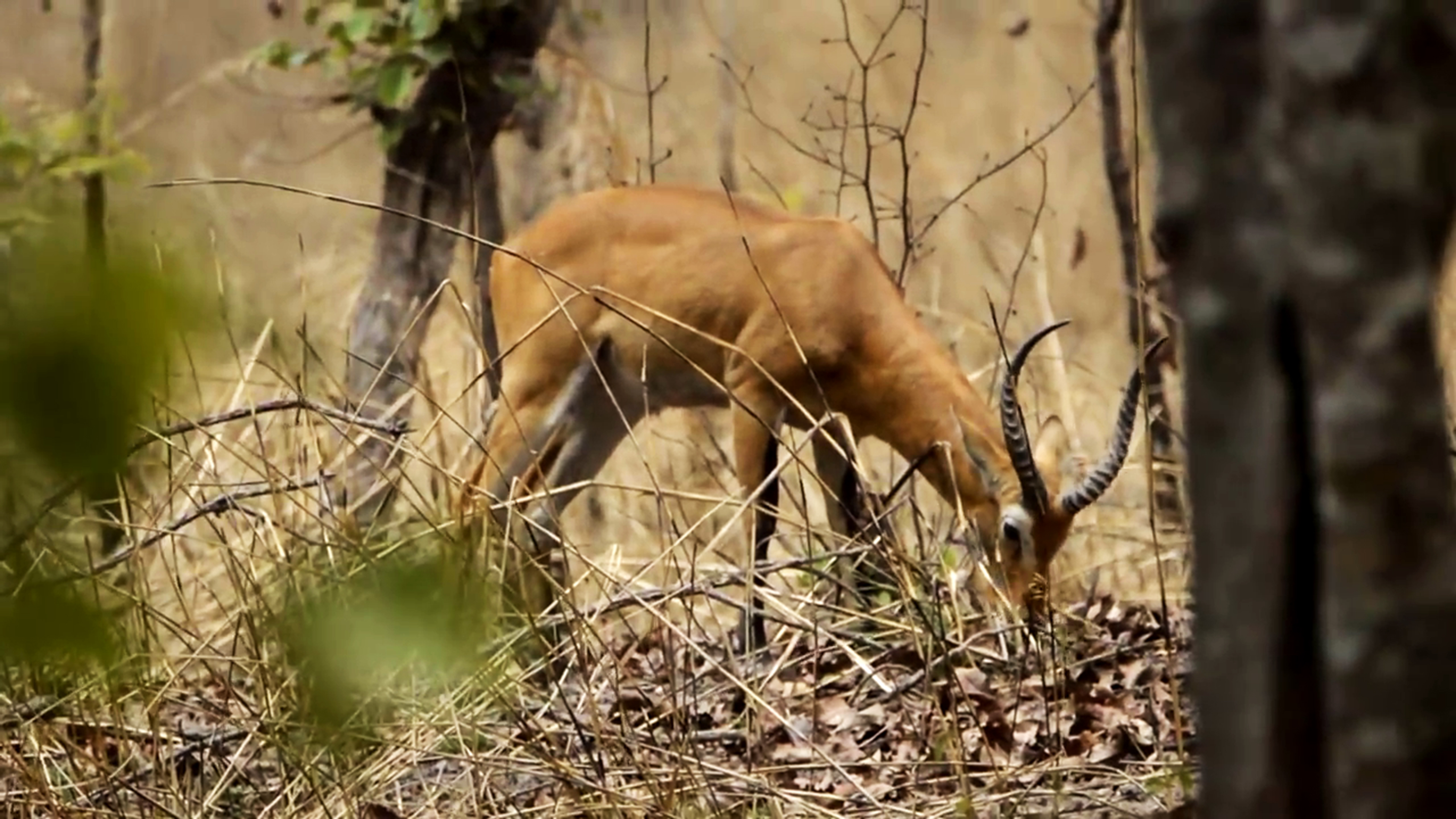
  - Total: 1,781 955 Benoue National park antelope v
- Time zone: UTC+1 (WAT)

Bénoué is a department of North Province in Cameroon. The department covers an area of 13,614 km^{2} and as of 2005 had a total population of 1,781,955. The capital of the department lies at Garoua.

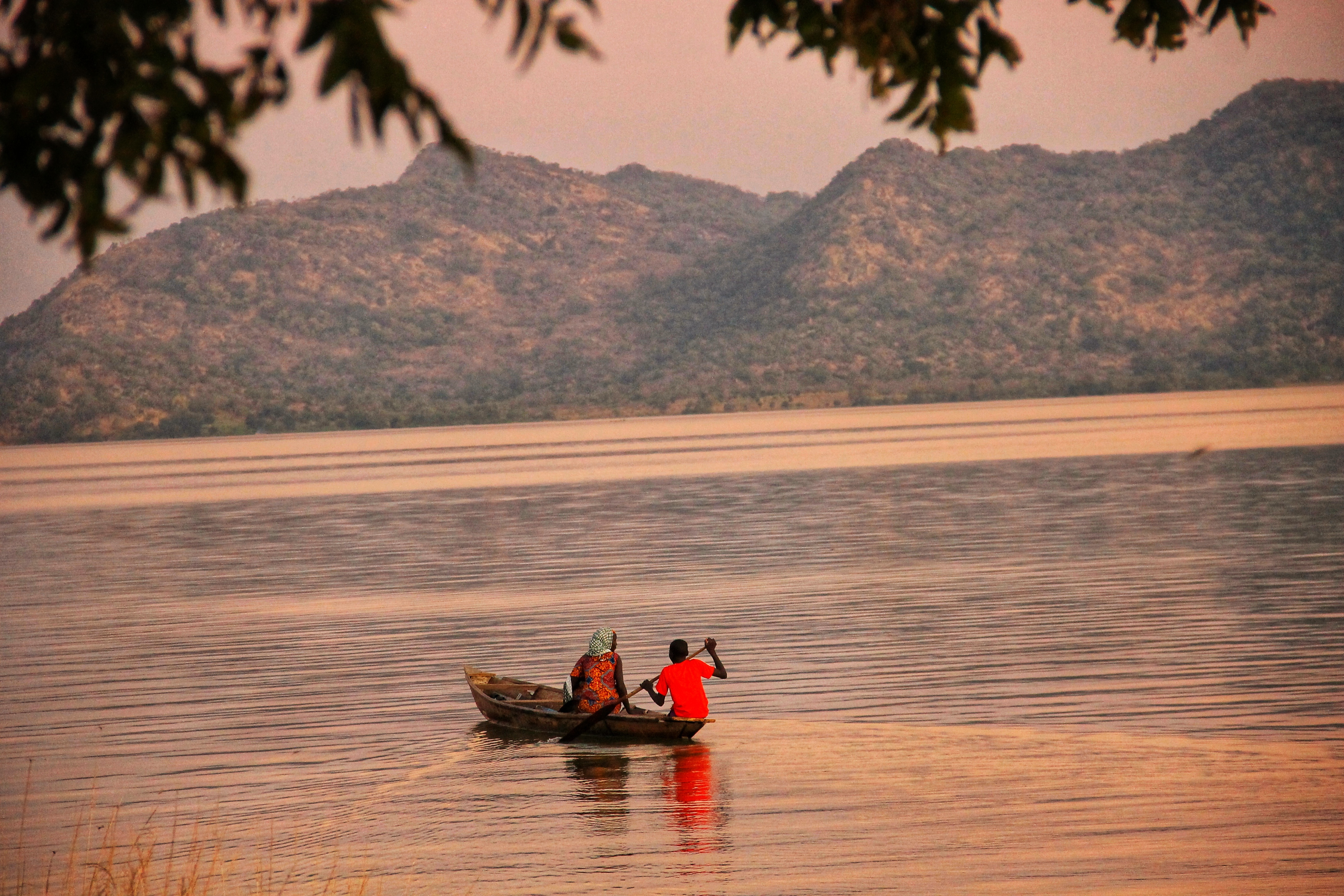
Traversée de la Benoué à pirogue

== Subdivisions ==
The department is divided administratively into 11 communes and in turn into villages.

=== Communes ===
- Barndaké
- Bashéo
- Bibemi
- Dembo
- Garoua (urban)
- Garoua ( rural )
- Gashiga
- Lagdo
- Ngong
- Pitoa
- Touroua

== Gallery ==
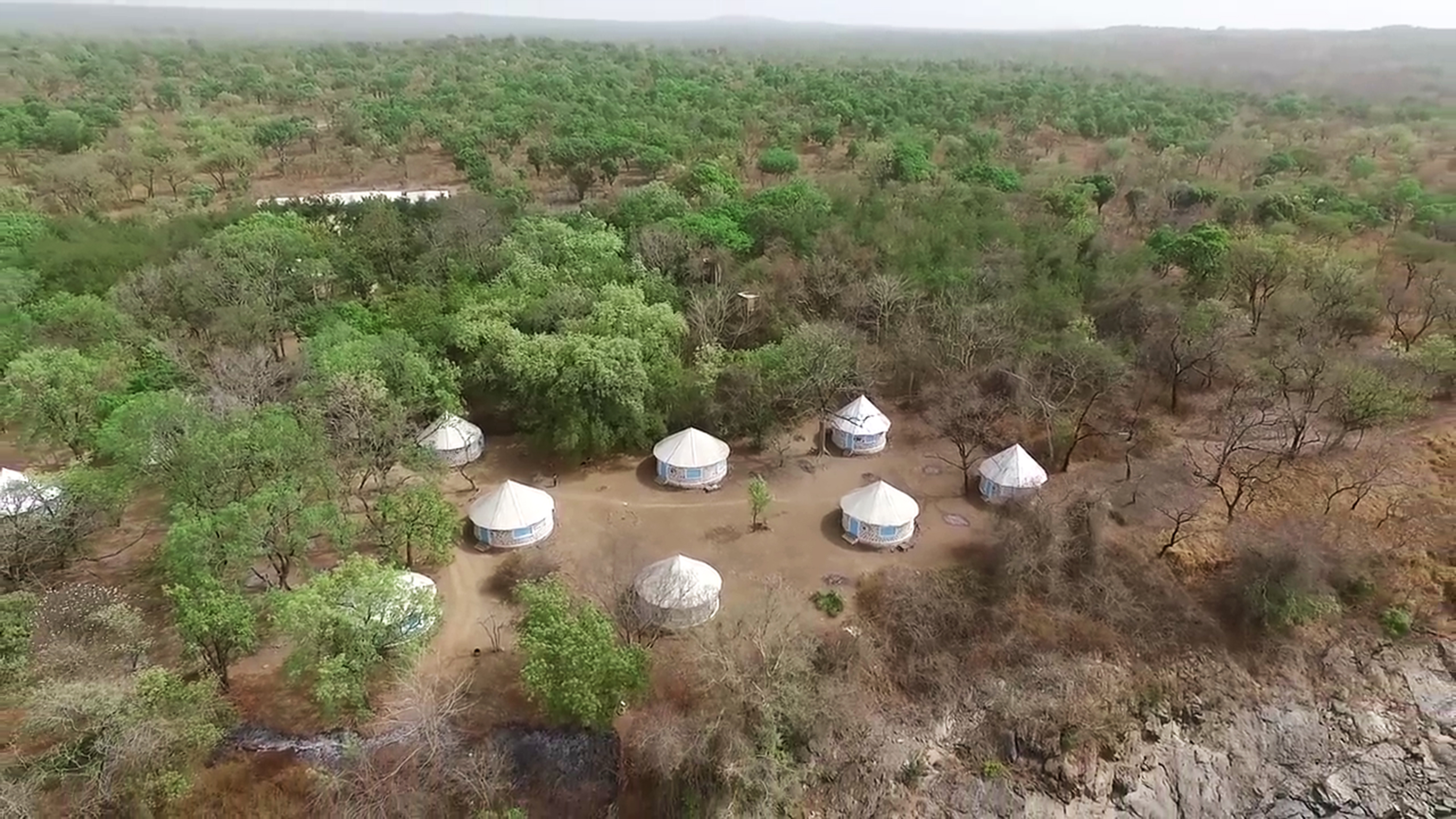
View of Bénoué huts from drone

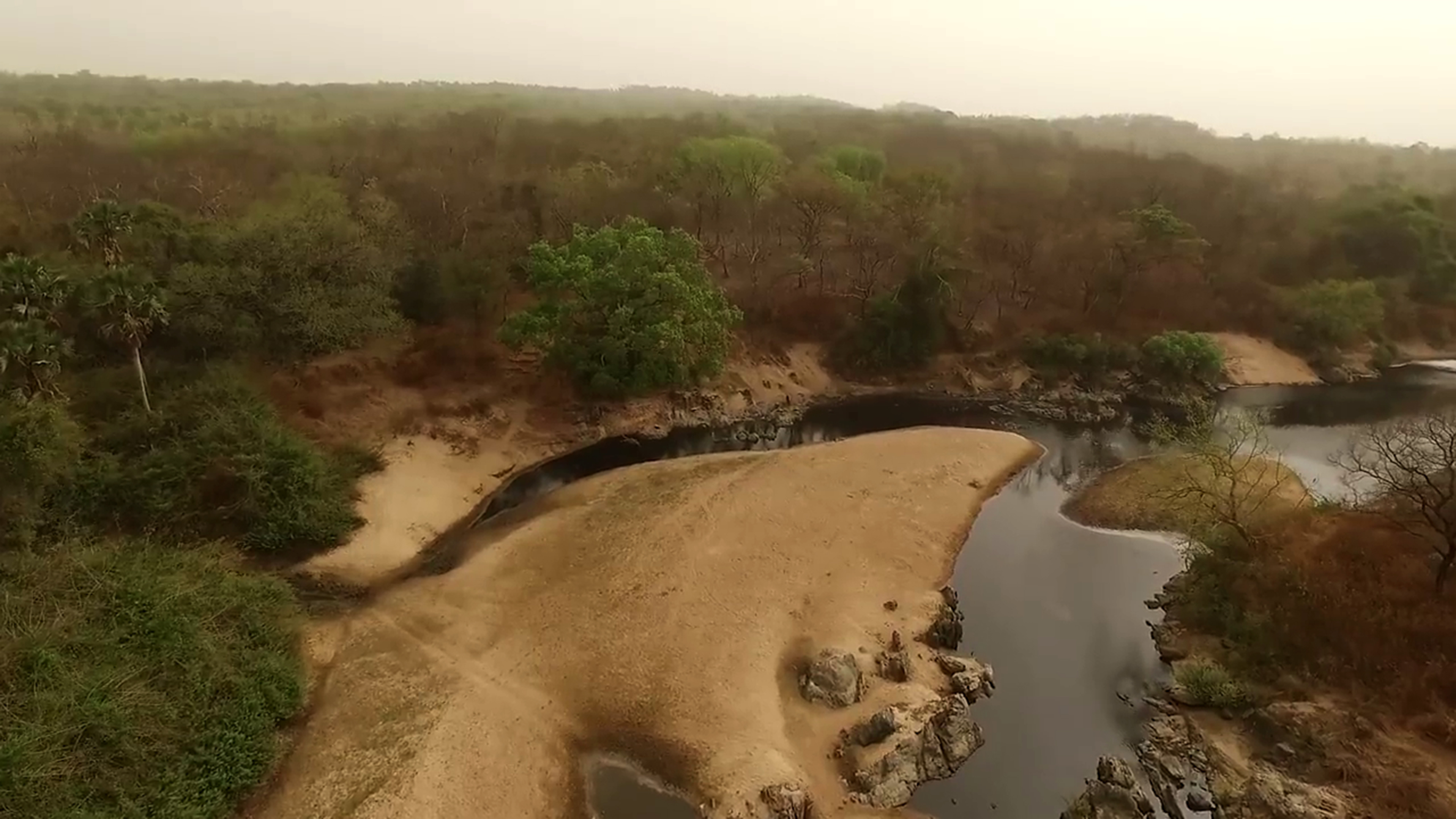
Bénoué view from drone

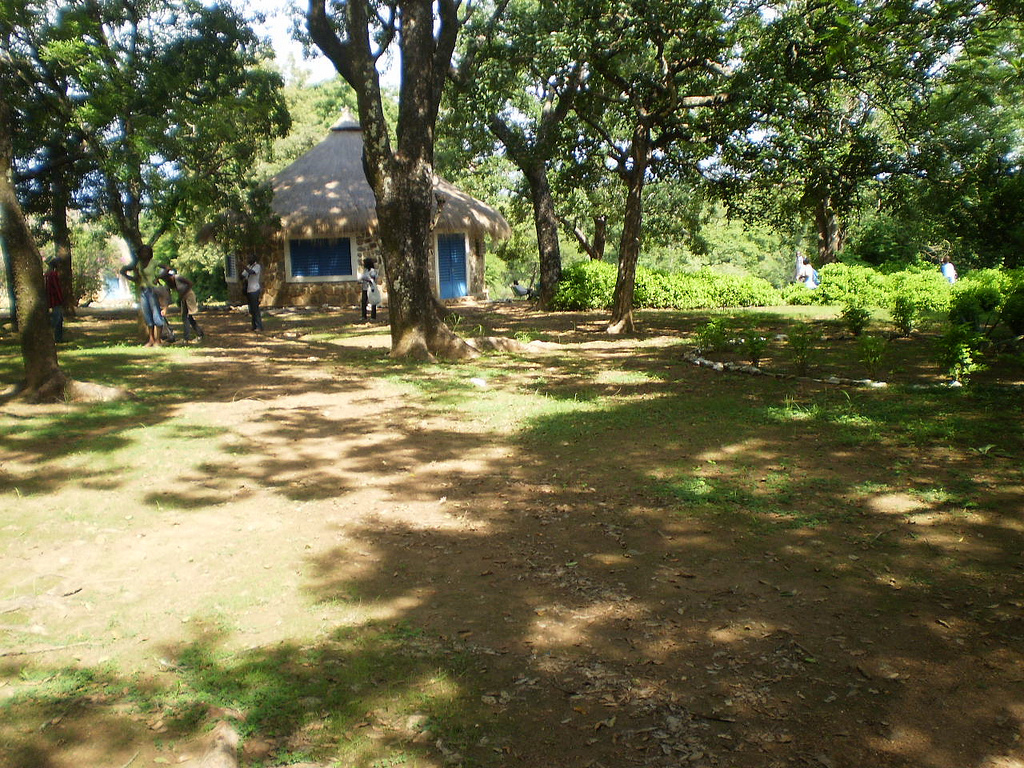
BénouéNP3

== See also ==
- Communes of Cameroon
