= Lagdo =

Town and commune in North Province, Cameroon

- Commune and town
- Location in Cameroon
- Coordinates: 9°03′N 13°44′E
- Country: Cameroon
- Region: North
- Department: Bénoué
- Elevation: 232 m (761 ft)

Population (2012)
  - Total: 28,239
- Time zone: UTC+1 (WAT)

Lagdo is a town and community in Cameroon. Lagdo is home to Lagdo Dam, which forms the Lagdo Reservoir out of the Benue River.

== See also ==
- Communes of Cameroon
