= Dembo (surname) =

Dembo is a surname, and may refer to:

- António Dembo, Angolan leader of UNITA
- Fennis Dembo, American basketball player
- Isaac Dembo, Russian-Jewish physician
- Leonard Dembo, Zimbabwean guitar-band musician
- Richard Dembo, French director and screenwriter of Israeli origin
- Ron Dembo, financial engineer and entrepreneur
- Yelena Dembo, Greek chess player
