= Barndaké =

Coordinates: 4.6298°N 11.7068°E

- Commune and town
- Interactive map of Barndaké
- Country: Cameroon
- Region: North
- Department: Bénoué

Population (2005)
  - Total: 38,986
- Time zone: UTC+1 (WAT)

Barndaké is a town and commune in the Bénoué department, North Region of Cameroon. It is near from the Cameroon-Nigeria border. As of 2005 census, it had a population of 39,986.

== See also ==
- Communes of Cameroon
