= Ministry of Women's Empowerment and the Family (Cameroon) =

Government ministry of Cameroon responsible for women's rights and the family

- Ministère de la Promotion de la Femme et de la Famille

Agency overview
- Jurisdiction: Government of Cameroon
- Headquarters: Yaoundé
- Minister responsible: Marie-Thérèse Abena Ondoa, Minister of Women's Empowerment and the Family

The Ministry of Women's Empowerment and the Family (Ministère de la Promotion de la Femme et de la Famille), known by its French acronym MINPROFF, is the government department of Cameroon responsible for the promotion and protection of women's rights and the protection of the family. It is headed by Marie-Thérèse Abena Ondoa.

== Mandate ==
The ministry prepares and implements government measures to promote and uphold women's rights, to strengthen the promotion and protection of the family, and to promote and protect the rights of children. It studies and proposes measures to ease women's access to employment across all sectors of activity, and is the government's link with international organisations working on women's empowerment.

== Programs and partnerships ==
MINPROFF collaborates with various international and national organizations to implement its mandate and advance gender equality in Cameroon.

In 2025, the ministry signed a partnership agreement with the World Food Programme (WFP) to boost gender equality and food security, with a focus on supporting vulnerable populations. That same year, it partnered with Plan International to promote the rights of women and girls, including joint programs to prevent gender-based violence.

The ministry also works closely with UNICEF on initiatives such as the Girls' Movement Cameroon, which aims to empower young girls and protect their rights. At the national level, MINPROFF collaborates with the National Institute of Statistics (INS) to improve gender data collection, monitor national policies, and inform evidence-based policy making.
