= Dembo, Cameroon =

Dembo
- Commune and town
- Interactive map of Dembo
- Coordinates: 9°42′44″N 13°33′01″E
- Country: Cameroon
- Region: North
- Department: Bénoué

Population (2005)
  - Total: 15,816
- Time zone: UTC+1 (WAT)

Dembo is a town and commune in the Bénoué department, North Region of Cameroon. As of 2005 census, it had a population of 15,816.

== See also ==
- Communes of Cameroon
