= Decree number 2004/320 =

Decree of Cameroon

Decree number 2004/320 is a presidential decree issued on December 8, 2004 by Paul Biya that organized 29 ministries of the Government of Cameroon.

== Provisions ==
Provisions of the decree include:

- Creation of the Ministry of Youth Affairs.
- Splitting the Ministry of Environment and Forests into the Ministry of Forests and Fauna and the Ministry of Environment and Protection of Nature.
- Reorganisation of the Ministry of Energy and Water.
- Creation of the Ministry of Small and Medium-Sized Enterprises, Social Economy and Handicraft.
- Transfer of responsibility for authorisation of the use of government vehicles from the Prime Minister's Office to the Ministry of State Property and Land Tenure.
