= Isaac Dembo =

Russian-Jewish physician

- Born: 1846; Ponevezh, Kovno Governorate, Russian Empire
- Died: 1906 (aged 59–60); Saint Petersburg, Russian Empire
- Education: University of Saint Petersburg
- Occupation: Physician

Isaac Dembo (Yiddish: יצחק בן אהרן דעמבאָ, Russian: Исаак Александрович Дембо) was a Russian-Jewish physician.

== Biography ==
Dembo was born to an Orthodox Jewish family in Ponevezh, Kovno Governorate. He studied Hebrew and rabbinical literature under the direction of Shmuel Salant and other Talmudic authorities until the age of fourteen, when he devoted himself to secular studies, and in 1870 graduated as M.D. from the University of Saint Petersburg. He served as physician in several hospitals, and in 1877, on the outbreak of the Russo-Turkish War, enlisted in the medical department of the army. He was awarded a medal for his services. In 1881–82 he traveled in Germany and France, and on his return to Saint Petersburg was appointed physician to the Alexandrowski Hospital. In 1888 the government bestowed upon him the title of 'privy councillor.'

Dembo turned his attention to the scientific study of sheḥita, the slaughtering of animals according to Jewish law. In Switzerland and in Germany attempts had been made to secure the prohibition of kosher butchering, on the plea that it caused the animals unnecessary pain. After investigating the matter and studying the methods of slaughtering in Russia and abroad, Dembo arrived at the conclusion that sheḥita caused less pain than other methods. The German Society for Public Health and French Academy of Medicine apparently agreed with his conclusions, and the Prussian Military Office, which produced canned meat, introduced a new method of slaughter in response to Dembo's reports.

He published two works on this subject; namely, Anatomisch-physiologische Grundlagen der verschiedenen Methoden des Viehschlachtens (1894) and Das Schächten im Vergleich mit anderen Schlachtmethoden (1894). The latter work was prefaced by endorsements from Rudolf Virchow and William Preyer, and translated into French, English, and Hebrew.

== Partial bibliography ==
- Dembo, Isaac (1883). K voprosu o nezavisimosti sokrashenii matki ot cerebro-spinaluoi nervnoi sistemy [Contraction of uterus independent of cerebro-spinal nervous system] (in Russian). Saint Petersburg: Tipografia M. I. Rumsha.
- — (1894). Anatomisch-physiologische Grundlagen der verschiedenen Methoden des Viehschlachtens. Vortrage gehalten in der Petersburger Medizinischen Gesellschaft am 1. und 15. Dezember 1893 (in German). Leipzig: H. Rokoschny.
- — (1894). Das Schächten im Vergleich mit anderen Schlachtmethoden. Vom Standpunkte der Humanität und Hygiene beleuchtet (in German). Leipzig: H. Roskoschny.
- — (1894). "Über den physiologischen Werth der verschiedenen Schlachtmethoden". Verhandlungen der Physiologischen Gesellschaft zu Berlin. Vortrag Gehalten an der 6. Sitzung der Physiologischen Gesellschaft Am 26. Januar 1894 (in German).
- — (1894). La protection des animaux dans l'antiquité et au XIXe siècle (in French). Berne: Imprimerie Stempfli & Cie.
