= Bibemi =

- Commune and town
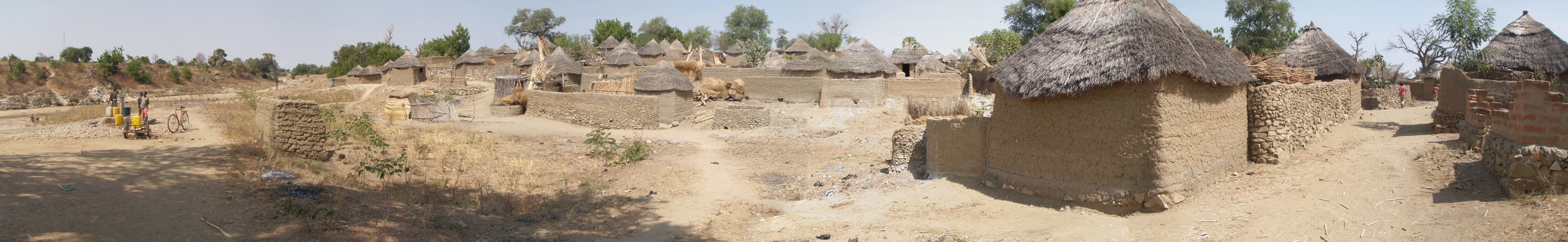
- Panorama of a Bibemi compound and street

- Location in Cameroon
- Coordinates: 9.3089°N 13.8727°E
- Country: Cameroon
- Region: North
- Department: Bénoué

Population (2005)
  - Total: 133,191
- Time zone: UTC+1 (WAT)

Bibemi is a town and commune in Cameroon.

== Notable people ==
- Goggo Addi (1911–1999), storyteller who worked to preserve Fulani cultural heritage

== See also ==
- Communes of Cameroon
