= Ngong, Cameroon =

Coordinates: 9°00′01″N 13°11′00″E

Ndong
- Commune and town
- Interactive map of Ndong
- Country: Cameroon
- Region: North
- Department: Bénoué

Population (2005)
  - Total: 92,568
- Time zone: UTC+1 (WAT)

Ngong is a town and commune in the Bénoué department, North Region of Cameroon. As of 2005 census, it had a population of 92,568.

== See also ==
- Communes of Cameroon
