= Touroua =

Coordinates: 9°05′N 12°58′E

- Commune and town
- Interactive map of Touroua
- Country: Cameroon
- Time zone: UTC+1 (WAT)

Touroua is a town and commune in Cameroon.

== See also ==
- Communes of Cameroon
