= Garoua =

City in North Region, Cameroon

- City
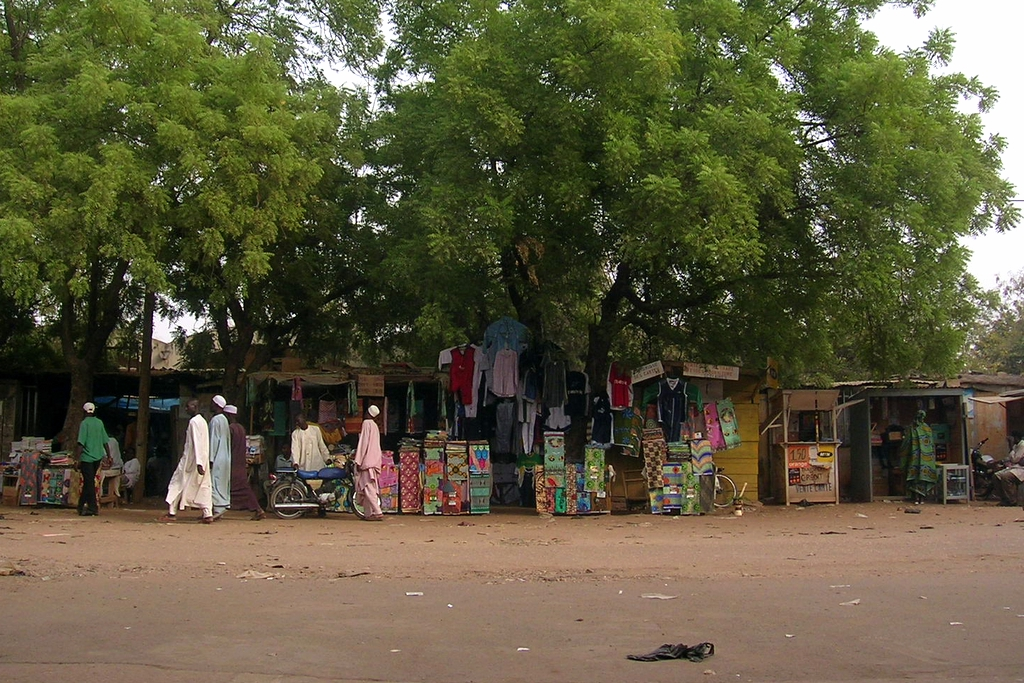
- The Market at Garoua

- Location in Cameroon
- Coordinates: 9°18′N 13°24′E
- Country: Cameroon
- Region: North
- Department: Bénoué
- Elevation: 249 m (817 ft)

Population (2022)
  - Total: 900,000
- Climate: Aw

Garoua (also Garua; Fula: 𞤺𞤢𞤪𞤱𞤢, Garwa) is a port city and the capital of the North Region of Cameroon, lying on the Benue River. A thriving centre of the textiles and cotton industries, the city has approximately 900,000 inhabitants in 2022, with a large population of Fulbe/Fulani people.

== History ==
Garoua was established by the Fulani emir Modibbo Adama in the first half of the 19th century. During the steamship era, it developed into a major river port.

The population of the city was 30,000 in 1967.

== Geography ==
Garoua is situated in northern Cameroon, and lies on the Benue River. It serves as the gateway to Benoue National Park. Neighborhoods include Commercial Centre, Lopere, Quartier de Marouare, Poumpoumre, Roumde Adjia and the northwestern suburb of Yelwa, near Garoua International Airport.

== Climate ==
Garoua has a tropical savanna climate (Köppen Aw), with a wet season and a dry season and the temperature being hot year-round. The average temperature in Garoua ranges from 26.0 °C (78.8 °F) in December and January, the coolest months, to 33.0 °C (91.4 °F) in April, the hottest month. The hottest time of year is in March and April, just before the wet season starts. March has the highest average high at 39.8 °C (103.6 °F), while the highest average low is 26.4 °C (79.5 °F) in April. August has the lowest average high at 30.7 °C (87.3 °F), while December has the lowest average low at 17.3 °C (63.1 °F).

Garoua receives 997.4 millimetres (39.27 in) of rain over 88 precipitation days, with a distinct wet and dry season like most tropical savanna climates. December, January and February receive no precipitation at all. August, the wettest month, receives 247.9 millimetres (9.76 in) of rainfall on average. September has 24 precipitation days, which is the most of any month. Garoua receives 2927.1 hours of sunshine annually on average, with the sunshine being distributed evenly across the year, although it is lower during the wet season.

Climate data for Garoua
Month	Jan	Feb	Mar	Apr	May	Jun	Jul	Aug	Sep	Oct	Nov	Dec	Year
Mean daily maximum °C (°F)	34.4 (93.9)	37.3 (99.1)	39.8 (103.6)	39.5 (103.1)	36.5 (97.7)	33.2 (91.8)	31.1 (88.0)	30.7 (87.3)	31.5 (88.7)	34.2 (93.6)	36.0 (96.8)	34.8 (94.6)	34.9 (94.8)
Daily mean °C (°F)	26.0 (78.8)	28.9 (84.0)	32.2 (90.0)	33.0 (91.4)	30.7 (87.3)	28.2 (82.8)	26.6 (79.9)	26.4 (79.5)	26.7 (80.1)	28.1 (82.6)	27.3 (81.1)	26.0 (78.8)	28.3 (82.9)
Mean daily minimum °C (°F)	17.5 (63.5)	20.5 (68.9)	24.7 (76.5)	26.4 (79.5)	24.9 (76.8)	23.2 (73.8)	22.2 (72.0)	22.0 (71.6)	21.9 (71.4)	22.2 (72.0)	19.2 (66.6)	17.3 (63.1)	21.8 (71.2)
Average rainfall mm (inches)	0.0 (0.0)	0.0 (0.0)	2.0 (0.08)	44.1 (1.74)	108.4 (4.27)	134.8 (5.31)	205.3 (8.08)	247.9 (9.76)	190.0 (7.48)	63.3 (2.49)	1.6 (0.06)	0.0 (0.0)	997.4 (39.27)
Average rainy days (≥ 1.0 mm)	0	0	1	5	9	11	14	17	24	6	1	0	88
Mean monthly sunshine hours	275.0	252.6	260.1	245.4	256.7	224.4	194.0	187.2	204.5	261.5	279.2	286.5	2,927.1
Source: NOAA

== Demographics ==
In 2022, Garoua had a population of 900,000 people. The city has a large population of the Fulbe ethnic group. Due to a significant number of Chadian expatriates in the city, there is a Chadian Consulate here.

== Economy ==
As the fourth largest port in Cameroon, Garoua is a major center of trade in the country. It developed as a centre for trade in petroleum, cement, hides, peanuts, and cotton, transported on ships along the Benue River, between Burutu in Nigeria.

It has long been a thriving centre of the cotton industry and houses several textile processing facilities and factories. The cotton company Sodecoton has one of its major centres in the city.

Leatherwork and fishing are also notable industries.

== Sport ==
Roumdé Adjia Stadium was one of the arenas hosting the 2021 Africa Cup of Nations.

== Places of worship ==
Among the places of worship, there are, predominantly, Muslim mosques. There are also Christian churches and temples: Roman Catholic Archdiocese of Garoua (Catholic Church), Evangelical Church of Cameroon (World Communion of Reformed Churches), Presbyterian Church in Cameroon (World Communion of Reformed Churches), Cameroon Baptist Convention (Baptist World Alliance), Full Gospel Mission Cameroon (Assemblies of God).

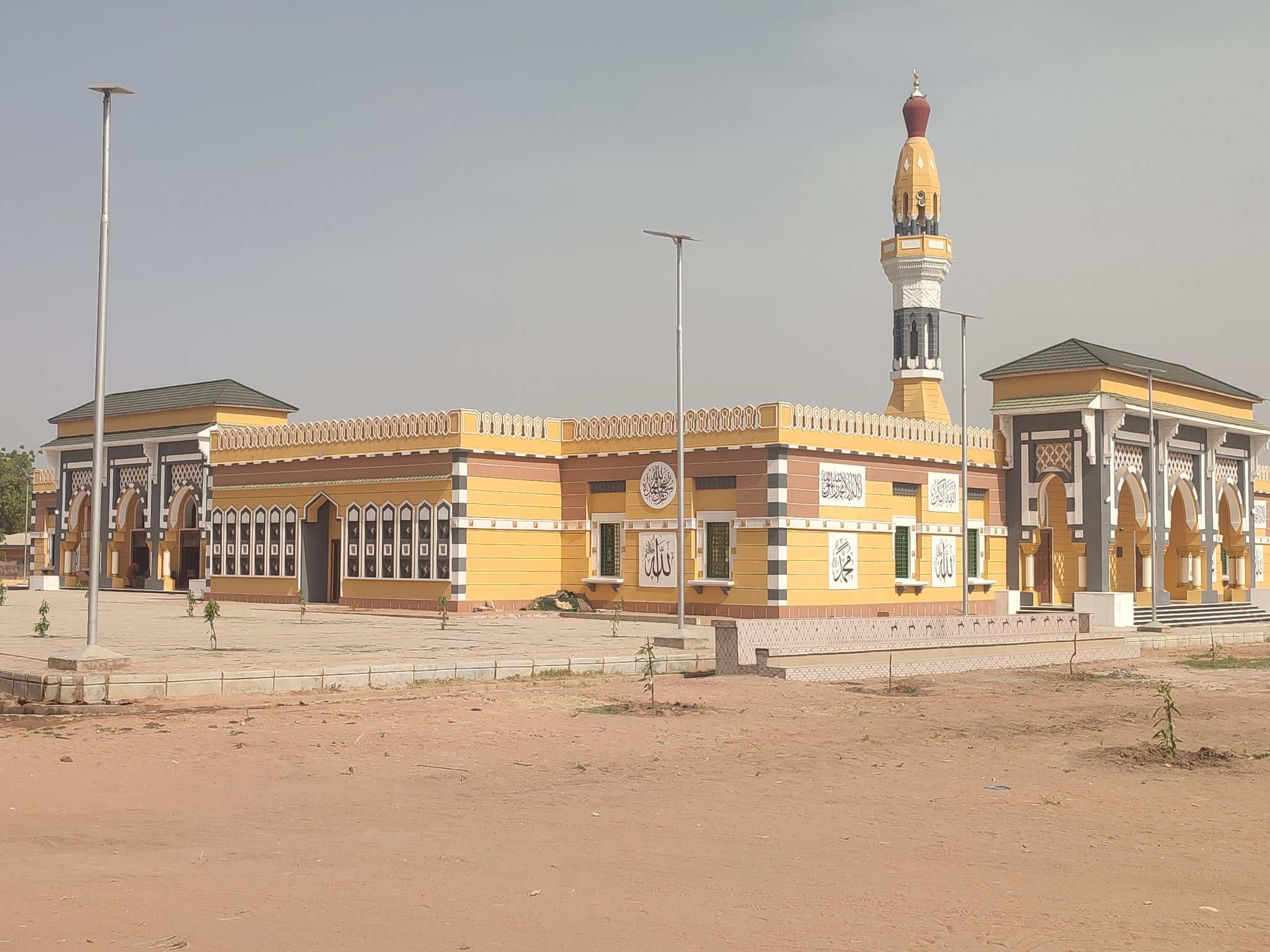
Mosque in Garoua

== Transport ==
Garoua is served by Garoua International Airport.

The United States military uses the airport as a base to conduct unmanned aerial vehicle operations. The city lies on National Highway 1, at a junction of the road between Maroua and Ngaoundéré. The main road leading north through the town and past the airport is called Rue de la Gendarmerie.

A new bus network is projected to start by 2026.

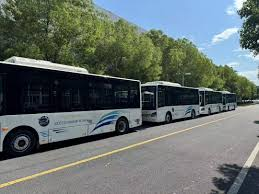
Garoua’s bus rolling stock

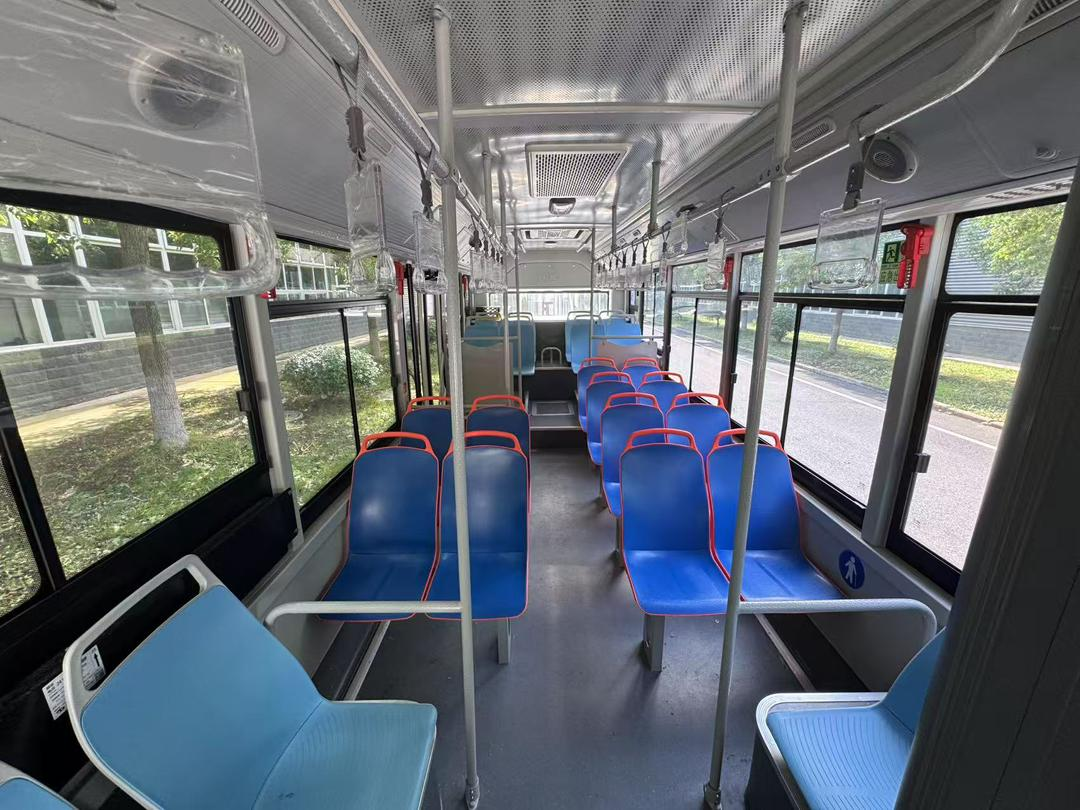
Interior of the rolling stock

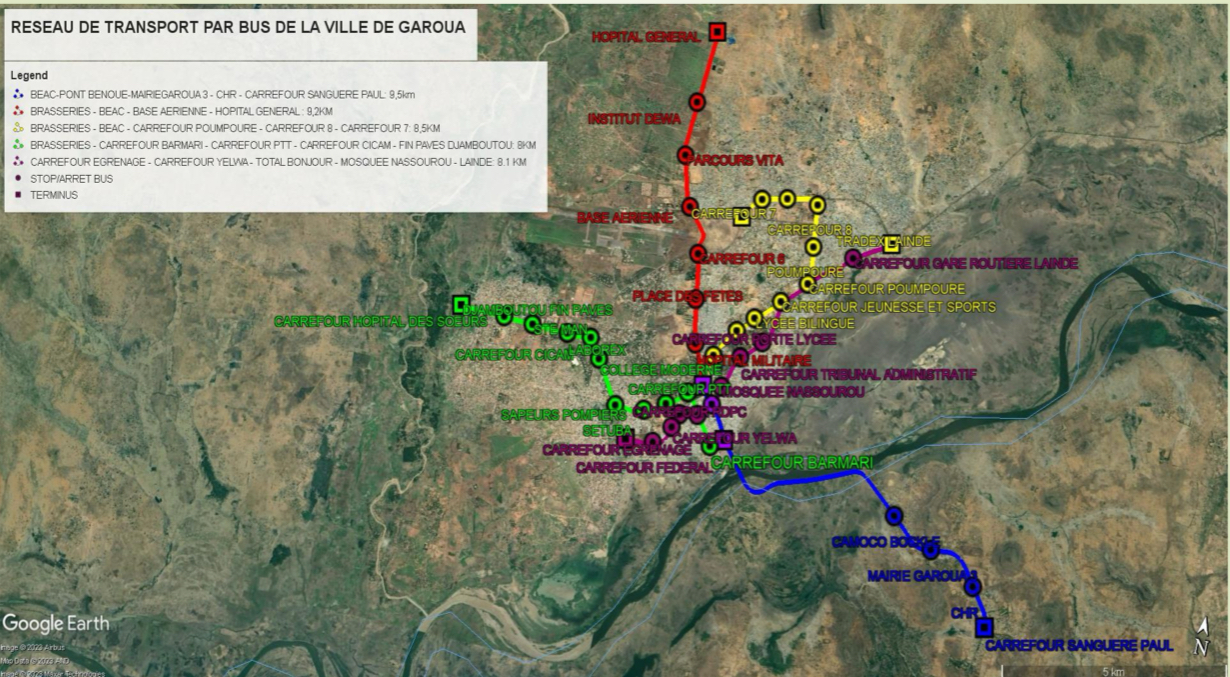
Garoua’s bus network

== Notable people ==
- Goggo Addi (1911–1999), storyteller who worked to preserve Fulani cultural heritage
- Ahmadou Ahidjo (1924–1989), first president of Cameroon
- Youssoufa Daoua (1947–2015), politician
- Gautier Bello (born 1983), footballer
- Vincent Aboubakar (born 1992), professional footballer
