= Pitoa =

- Commune and town
- Location in Cameroon
- Coordinates: 9°23′N 13°32′E
- Country: Cameroon
- Region: North
- Department: Bénoué
- Elevation: 295 m (968 ft)

Population (2012)
  - Total: 28,636
- Time zone: UTC+1 (WAT)

Pitoa is a town and commune in Cameroon. Oblo is spoken nearby

== See also ==
- Communes of Cameroon
