= Gashiga =

Coordinates: 9°26′N 13°22′E

Gaschiga
- Commune and town
- Interactive map of Gaschiga
- Country: Cameroon
- Time zone: UTC+1 (WAT)

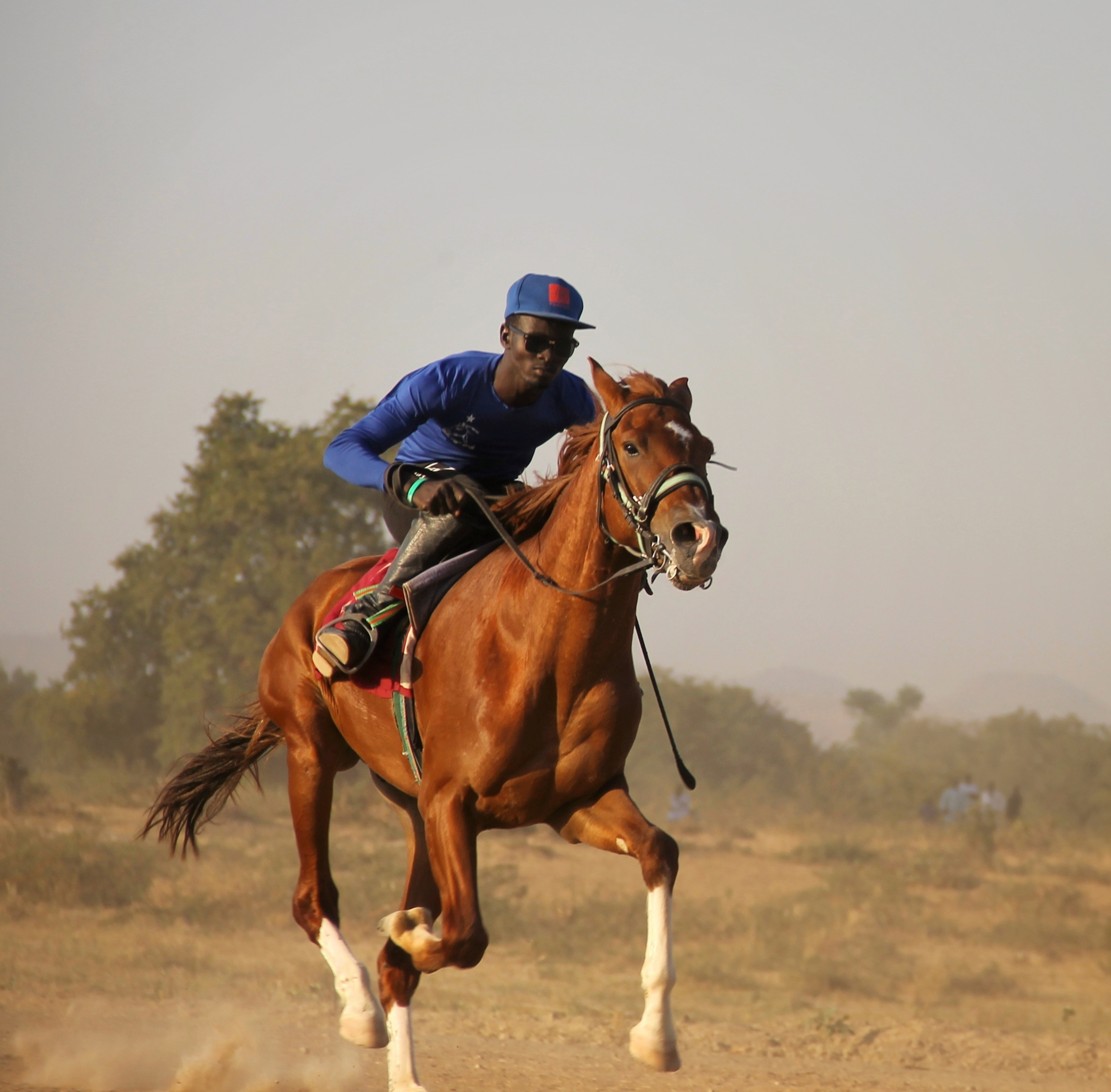
Equestrian in Gashiga

Gaschiga is a town and commune in Cameroon.

== See also ==
- Communes of Cameroon
