= Niete =

- Location in Cameroon
- Coordinates: 2°40′N 10°3′E
- Country: Cameroon
- Province: South Province
- Department: Océan

Niete (Niété in French) is a town in the Océan Department, South Province of Cameroon.

== See also ==
- Communes of Cameroon
