= Océan =

Coordinates: 2°56′04″N 9°54′19″E

- Department
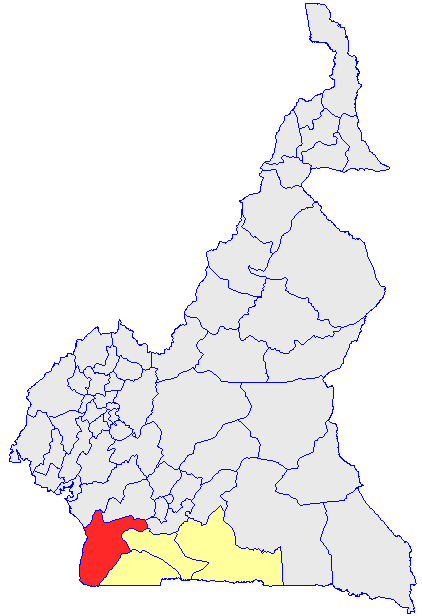
- Department location in Cameroon
- Country: Cameroon
- Province: South Province
- Capital: Kribi

Area
  - Total: 11,280 km^{2} (4,360 sq mi)

Population (2001)
  - Total: 133,062
  - Density: 11.80/km^{2} (30.55/sq mi)
- Time zone: UTC+1 (WAT)

Océan is a department of South Province in Cameroon. The department covers an area of 11,280 km^{2} and as of 2001 had a total population of 133,062. The capital of the department lies at Kribi.

== Subdivisions ==
The department is divided administratively into nine communes and in turn into villages.

=== Communes ===
- Akom II
- Bipindi
- Campo
- Kribi (urban)
- Kribi (rural)
- Lokundje
- Lolodorf
- Mvengue
- Niete
