= Akom II =

Coordinates: 2°47′N 10°34′E

- Commune and town
- Interactive map of Akom II
- Country: Cameroon
- Region: South
- Department: Océan

Population (2005)
  - Total: 8,802
- Time zone: UTC+1 (WAT)

Akom II is a town and commune in the Océan department, South Region of Cameroon. As of 2005 census, it had a population of 8,802.

== See also ==
- Communes of Cameroon
