= List of regions of Cameroon by Human Development Index =

This is a list of regions of Cameroon by Human Development Index as of 2025 with data for the year 2023.

Rank	Region	HDI (2023)
High human development
1	Littoral	0.702
Medium human development
2	Southwest	0.676
3	Centre	0.667
4	South	0.631
5	West	0.625
–	Cameroon	0.588
6	Northwest	0.561
Low human development
7	East	0.547
8	Adamawa	0.502
9	Far North	0.470
10	North	0.465
