= Campo, Cameroon =

Campo
- Location in Cameroon
- Coordinates: 2°22′N 9°49′E
- Country: Cameroon
- Province: South Province
- Division: Océan
- Elevation: 3.3 ft (1 m)

Campo is a town located on the Atlantic Ocean coast of southern Cameroon, serving as the main border town for travel to Equatorial Guinea. It is situated just north of the mouth of the Ntem River.

It lies near the Campo Ma'an National Park. Campo retains traces of German colonial heritage, notably in a public building on the beachfront near the town centre. It serves as the administrative center for the Campo Subdivision of the Ocean Division, housing the sub-divisional officer (SDO). The town is connected by road to Kribi along the coast and to Ma'an and Ebolowa via the road through Campo Ma'an National Park.

Tourism in Campo is increasing, largely driven by visitors to the National Park. The town is home to the headquarters of the National Park, where entrance fees must be paid.

== See also ==
- Communes of Cameroon
