= Mvengue =

Coordinates: 3.2833°N 11.0167°E

- Commune and town
- Interactive map of Mvengue
- Country: Cameroon
- Time zone: UTC+1 (WAT)

Mvengue is a town and commune in Cameroon.

== See also ==
- Communes of Cameroon
