= South Region (Cameroon) =

Region of Cameroon

South Region Région du Sud
- Region of Cameroon
- Location of South Region within Cameroon
- Coordinates: 2°30′N 11°45′E
- Country: Cameroon
- Capital: Ebolowa
- Departments: Dja-et-Lobo, Mvila, Océan, Vallée-du-Ntem

Government
  - Governor: Bernard Wongolo

Area
  - Total: 47,191 km^{2} (18,221 sq mi)

Population (2015)
  - Total: 749,552
  - Density: 15.883/km^{2} (41.138/sq mi)
- HDI (2022): 0.628 medium · 4th of 10

The South Region (French: Région du Sud) is located in the southwestern and south-central portion of the Republic of Cameroon. It is bordered to the east by the East Region, to the north by the Centre Region, to the northwest by the Littoral Region, to the west by the Gulf of Guinea (part of the Atlantic Ocean), and to the south by the countries of Equatorial Guinea, Gabon, and Congo. The South occupies 47,720 km^{2} of territory, making it the fourth largest region in the nation. The major ethnic groups are the various Beti-Pahuin peoples, such as the Ewondo, Fang, and Bulu.

The South Region has a fair amount of industry, its main commerce consisting of logging, timber, mining, and offshore oil drilling. Commercial agriculture is also important in the South, the major cash crops being cocoa and rubber. Cattle rearing and fishing are significant economic components, as well. Much of the population is made up of subsistence farmers.

== 2008 presidential decree abolishes provinces ==
In 2008, the President of the Republic of Cameroon, President Paul Biya signed decrees abolishing "Provinces" and replacing them with "Regions". Hence, all of the country's ten provinces are now known as Regions. This was to be the end of South.

== Geography ==
=== Land ===
The soil of the South is made up primarily of metamorphic rock, particularly gneiss. However, the land is riddled with faults around the border with the Centre Province that arc toward the border with Congo; granite deposits occur along this line. The soil is primarily ferrallitic except for southwestern portions near the border with Equatorial Guinea and moving north to Ebolowa, where it is mixed. Due to high amounts of leaching, the South's red earth is only marginally productive.

=== Drainage ===
Several river systems drain the South Region. The northernmost of these is the Nyong, which forms part of the border with the Littoral. The coastal Ocean division is drained by two rivers, the Lokounje to the north and the Lobé to the south. The Ntem, or Campo, rises in the east of the region and flows along or just north of the southern border to the town of Campo. All of these rivers empty into the Atlantic Ocean.

The Dja and Lobo Rivers flow through the easternmost division of the region, splitting south of Bengbis and encompassing the Dja Reserve. These two rivers form part of the Congo River basin.

=== Relief ===
The South Region begins at sea level on the coast. The land slowly climbs throughout the Kribi-Douala basin, which averages 300–600 metres in altitude, until it reaches the South Cameroon Plateau with elevations of 500 to 1000 metres above sea level. Rocky promontories on the coast and rolling, tree-covered hills inland characterize the land. The Ntem Massif near Ebolowa is the province's highest point at 1400 metres.

=== Climate ===
The climate of the South Region is Type A or Guinea-type climate. Humidity is high, and precipitation averages 1500–2000 mm per year in the interior and 2000–3000 mm per year in the coastal region. The coast from the north of Kribi south to Ebodjé gets as much as 4000 mm of rain per year. Temperatures are relatively high as well, averaging 24˚ C and 26˚ C from Kribi north along the coast.

In lieu of traditional seasons, the Guinea-type climate affords alternating dry and wet periods. The year begins in a long dry season that lasts from December to May. This is followed by a light wet season from May to June and a short dry season from July to October. A heavy wet season begins around October and lasts through November.

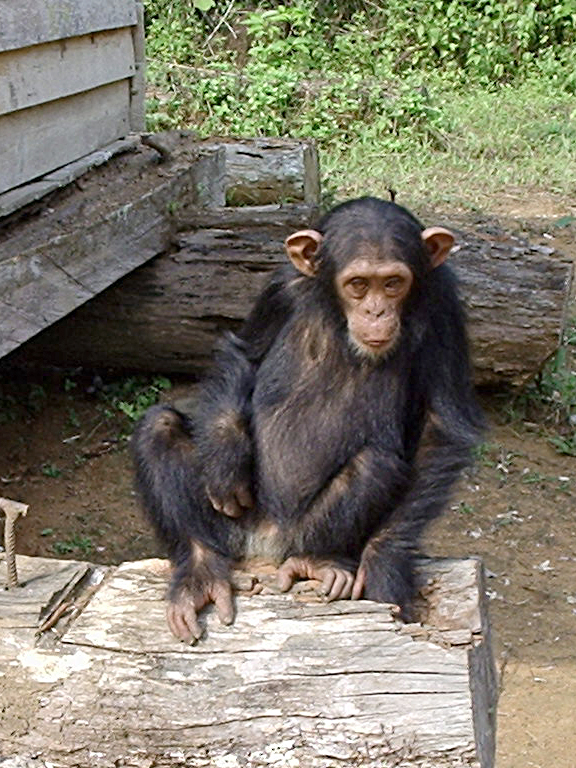
Orphaned chimpanzee near Djoum

=== Plant and animal life ===
The South is almost entirely covered in rain forest, the exception being a small tract of mangrove on the coast south of Campo. Much of this land has been intensely exploited for logging, however, allowing sunlight to penetrate to the forest floor and for thick undergrowth to flourish.

Today, the only relatively untouched forest is located in a handful of nature reserves. The Dja Reserve (Réserve du Biosphère du Dja) covers 5,260 km² in the northeastern portion of the province and the south-central portion of the neighbouring East. The Campo Reserve (Réserve du Campo) covers 2,640 km² in the southwest on the border with Equatorial Guinea. Finally, the Mangame Gorilla Sanctuary (Sanctuaire à Gorilles de Mangame) covers 1,224 km² on the Gabon border. In these more virgin areas, the forest is composed of multiple levels. Tall trees about 40 metres high make up the highest stratum. Below these lie smaller, thinner trees with leaves clustered at their tops. The forest bed has very little vegetation as little sunlight penetrates to it.

The southern rain forest supports abundant wildlife, including some of Cameroon's last populations of chimpanzees, gorillas, and elephants. All of these are becoming increasingly rare due to poaching and deforestation. More numerous are the various monkey, bat, and bird species. Other common animals include pangolins, porcupines and other rodents, and genets.

== Demographics ==
Historical population
Year	Pop.	±% p.a.
1976	315,202	—
1987	373,798	+1.56%
2005	634,655	+2.98%
2015	749,552	+1.68%

=== Settlement patterns ===
Over 324,000 Cameroonians live in the South Province, and the overall population density is about seven inhabitants per square km. The most populous area is the central region south of Cameroon's capital, Yaoundé, in the neighbouring Centre Province and extending south to Ebolowa, west to Kribi, and east to Sangmélima. The rest of the population lives in the villages and towns built around the roads that criss-cross the terrain. In contrast, the vast tracts of jungle that have little or no road access are scarcely populated. The forest area is also plagued by disease-carrying mosquitoes and blackflies that keep settlers away.

Tradition settlements in the Centre are placed along roads, resulting in large numbers of houses near the road with forest beginning directly behind them. The traditional house is a rectangular structure made of mud bricks and thin, wooden or bamboo posts. Roofs were mostly thatched raffia palm in the past, but they are more often made of corrugated aluminium, iron, or tin today.

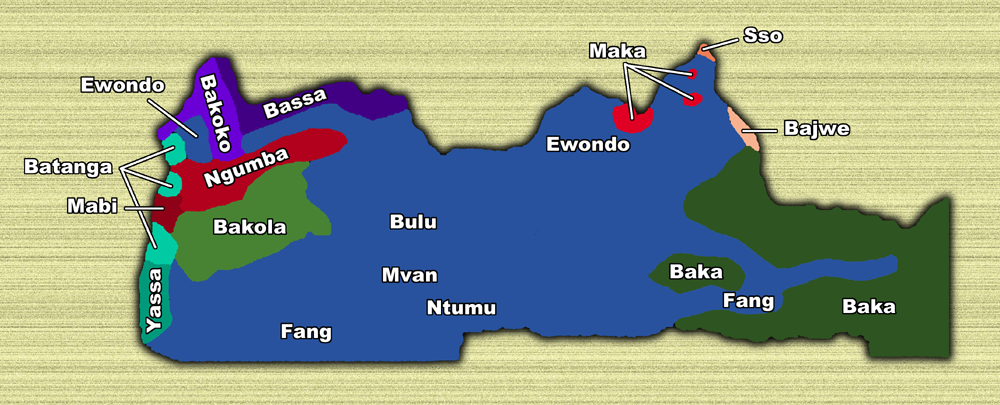
Locations of South Province ethnic groups

=== People ===
The majority of the inhabitants of the South are members of various Bantu tribes that are collectively known as the Beti-Pahuin (Béti-Pahouin), the Fang-Beti, or simply the Fang. All of these groups speak various dialects of the Beti language. In addition, most inhabitants of the more populated areas can also speak French.

==== Beti-Pahuin ====
The Beti portion of the group is primarily situated in the Centre Province, but large numbers of Ewondo and Bane inhabit the Ntem and the Dja and Lobo divisions of the South.

The Fang group lives close to the province's southern borders. The Fang proper are inland on the border with Equatorial Guinea and near Djoum. The Ntumu inhabit the area around Ambam, also on the southern border. The Mvang (or Mvae) occupy the regions directly east and west of the Ntumu. These tribal groups have many more members in Equatorial Guinea, Gabon, and the Congo.

The Bulu form the third group with about a third of the total Beti-Pahuin population. They are further broken down into the Bulu proper, who inhabit the rich cocoa producing area from Kribi to Ebolowa and east through Sangmélima and Djoum. Inland from Kribi live the Pahuin proper, centered on the villages of Bivouba and Fifinda. The Zaman occupy the valley of the Dja River.

==== Other tribes ====
Several non-Pahuin tribes also inhabit parts of the South. Several related peoples who speak Makaa–Njem languages live inland a short ways. One of these is the Mabi, who live inland of this around Eboundja. The Ngumba (Numba) tribe inhabits portions of the interior around Bandévouri to Lolodorf. The Mabea (Maboa), also have pockets or territory. Non-Makaa–Njem-speaking groups include the Batanga, who occupy the coastal region from Kribi to Grand Batanga. The Bakolo (Bakolle) are a coastal people north of Kribi, and the Bakola live inland from the border with Equatorial Guinea to Ngumba territory. Most of these tribes have their own distinct languages.

The South is also home to some of Cameroon's oldest continuous inhabitants, pygmies of the Baka (Babinga, Bibaya) and Beye'ele tribes. These hunter-gatherers roam the forests of the region, particularly the area at the center and southeast of the province from Ebolowa to Ambam and Djoum with the Lala on the coast near Lolodorf, Bipindi, and Kribi. These pygmy groups are becoming increasingly sedentary, however, taking up lifestyles very similar to their Beti-Pahuin and Makaa–Njem-speaking neighbours and intermarrying with them.

=== Religion ===
Presbyterian and Roman Catholic missionaries converted most of the peoples of the region by the mid-20th century. Traditional beliefs are still strong, however, and large numbers of people still adhere to various animist beliefs, often in tandem with Christian beliefs. In some areas, such as the village of Mbéle, animists still form a majority.

== Economy ==
The South is one of Cameroon's most economically robust areas due to its numerous plantations and the tourism generated by its scenic beaches. The area's economic stronghold, however, is the port of Kribi, which services the Gulf of Guinea. Campo, near the border with Equatorial Guinea, is another important port.

=== Agriculture ===
==== Sustenance farming ====
The majority of farming in the South Province is done on the sustenance level. Plantains are the major crop grown, with cocoyams being common north of Ebolowa. Maize, groundnuts, manioc, yams, beans, and other foodstuffs are raised in more modest quantities.

Traditional farms are placed in forest plots that are cleared with basic tools such as axes, hoes, and machetes. This is done during the dry season, and the resulting brush is then burned, with care taken to preserve any fruit trees. Planting occurs at the start of the wet season. Vegetables and spices are grown close to the house, while tubers such as cassava, cocoyams, and yams are planted with plantains in larger fields further into the forest. Plots are fertilised with farmyard manure. Farmers harvest at the beginning of the next dry season.

These slash and burn methods provide high yields the first year or two, but they eventually drain the soil of fertility. This necessitates the clearing of more farmland every few years, as this exhausted land can remain infertile for up to ten years. This presents little problem in the South's more underpopulated areas, but can pose difficulties in areas of higher population density.

==== Plantation farming ====
The South's equatorial climate makes it suitable for large plantations, as well. Cocoa is the major cash crop for the entire region, with 80% of the arable land of Dja and Lobo division and Ocean division dedicated to raising it. Major cocoa collection facilities are located in Ebolowa. Rubber is another important crop, and a major operation is located at Njété, about 20 km inland from Kribi. Palm oil is harvested near Campo.

==== Other food sources ====
The South is also home to various animal husbandry operations. Poultry farms operate in the towns of Ebolowa and Sangmélima. Modest cattle rearing takes place inland from Kribi, as well, though the area's thick forests and the presence of the tsetse fly prevents larger-scale operations. Kribi is also the base for various commercial fishing interests that operate along the province's coast.

Rural inhabitants of the South also practice hunting and gathering. Hunters traditionally utilise basic tools such as spears, bows and arrows, knives, and traps. In modern times, guns are increasingly used as well. This latter development has led to a great depopulation of many animal species, especially as demand has risen in urban centers such as Yaoundé for bushmeat from the region.

=== Industry ===
With ocean access and vast tracts of forest, the South is home to a good deal of industry. Timber is a substantial part of the region's economy, and various logging companies have operations in the area. However, because the largest trees within the South itself have mostly been harvested, the region is increasingly being used as a transport network for logging vehicles from Equatorial Guinea, Gabon, and the Congo on their way to the ports of Kribi and Douala. Kribi is also the site of sawmills, and a palm oil mill operates in Lobé. Ebolowa was in past years an important ivory-working center, but government regulations and the scarcity of elephants in modern times have dampened this part of the economy. Much of the South's electricity is produced in hydroelectric power stations on the Ntem and Ma'an rivers.

The South also has a fair amount of mineral wealth. Iron ore is mined near Campo and Kribi. Natural gas is found offshore of Campo, and a Kribi-based plant has been processing this since the 1980s. Perhaps the region's most lucrative resource is oil. This, too, is found off the coast of Campo. But more importantly, the South Province is located at the terminus of the Chad-Cameroon oil pipeline, which was completed in June 2004. The pipe's mouth is located just south of Kribi, a fact that promises to bring in high revenues for both Cameroon and the province.

=== Transportation ===
For a region so heavily forested, the South has a fairly developed transportation network. Four main roads service the greater area of the region. The first of these, National Road 2, runs from Yaoundé to Ambam and then to the border with Gabon and Equatorial Guinea. National Road 7 is located completely in the South, travelling along the coast from Kribi to Campo. National Road 9 comes south from Yaoundé via Mbalmayo and then to Sangmélima, Djoum, and Mintom. Finally, National Road 17 begins at Sangmélima and goes to Megong before crossing the border to Gabon. Other major roads cover the stretches between Mbalmayo and Ebolowa and between Kribi and Edéa in the Littoral Province. Of these, the route from Edéa to Kribi and from Ebolowa and Sangmélima to Yaoundé are paved. All other roads in the province are dirt, and thus subject to weather conditions.

The South is also accessible via sea and air. The major seaports are Kribi and Campo, though Kribi is busier. Kribi is also the site of the regional airport. There are also airstrips at Ambam, Campo, Ebolowa, and Sangmélima.

=== Tourism ===
The South sees a good number of tourists due largely to its long, white-sand beaches. These run along the entire coastline, though the easiest to reach are at Kribi and Lobé. Kribi is the most popular destination due to its accessibility from Douala and Yaoundé via paved roads. It is also the largest beachfront town in the South, and it has an active nightlife and several large hotels. Undertow is a significant problem, however, and several bathers drown on Kribi's beaches each year, a fact the locals personify as the siren-like "Mami Water". The undertow at Campo is less dangerous, though the difficult road to reach that town keeps most holiday-seekers away.

Lobé, only a few kilometres south of Kribi, is another popular spot with tourists due to its even more isolated beaches and the picturesque Lobé Falls (chutes de Lobé), found where the Lobé River empties into the Atlantic. Local artists and vendors frequent the area around the falls, as do drivers offering to take passengers to Kribi or 65 km further south to see the Lala Pygmy village Elogbatindi, .

In addition, the Cameroonian government is working with various non-governmental organisations to develop ecotourism in the South. These efforts are largely concentrated on the area's two major parks, the Dja and Campo Reserves, both of which are bases for various gorilla habituation projects. The Netherlands Development Organisation runs another project that takes travellers to the Campo Reserve and then to traditional homes in Ebodjé, a village 25 km north.

Places in Lobé and Kribi

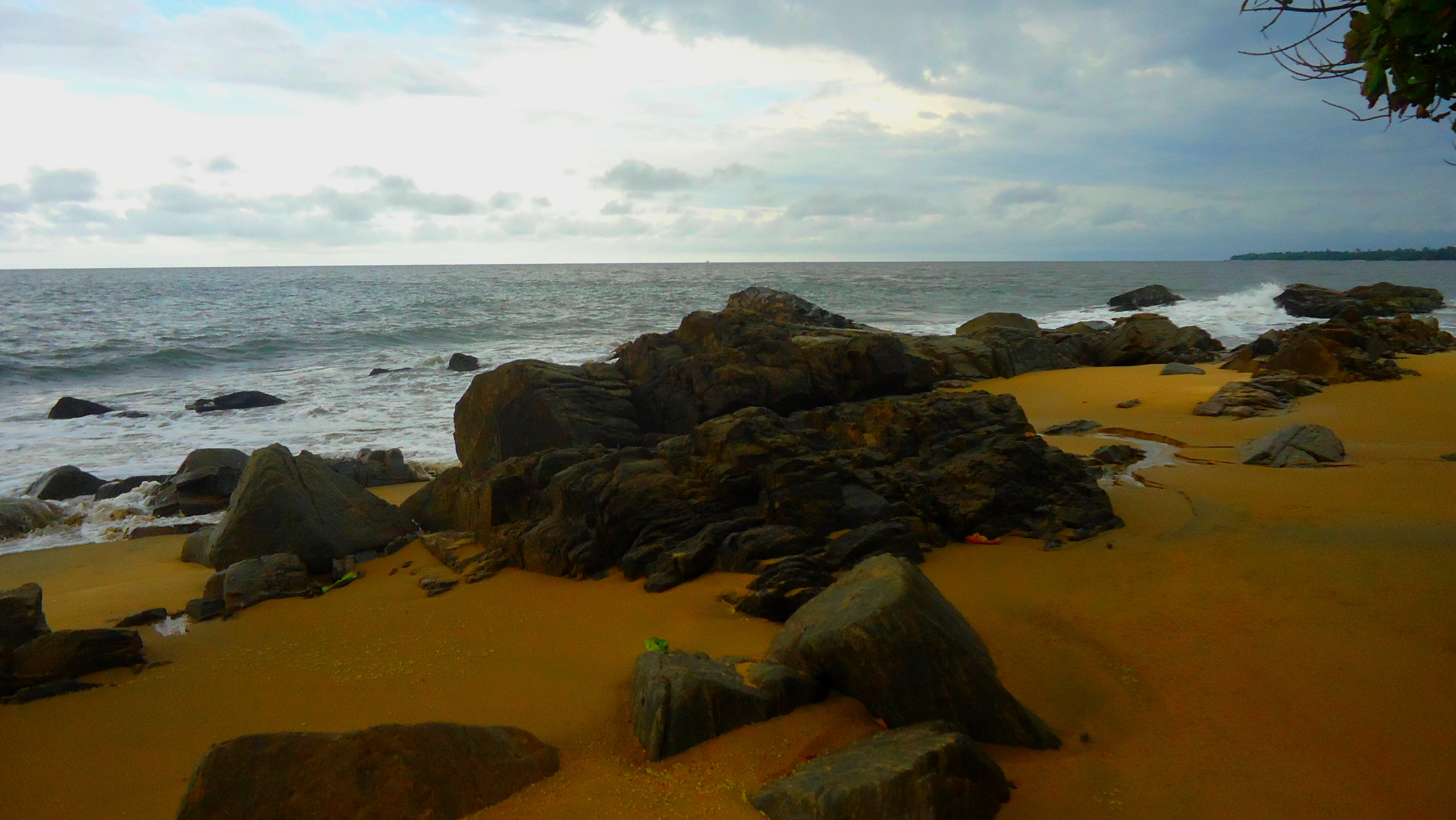
Lobe Beach

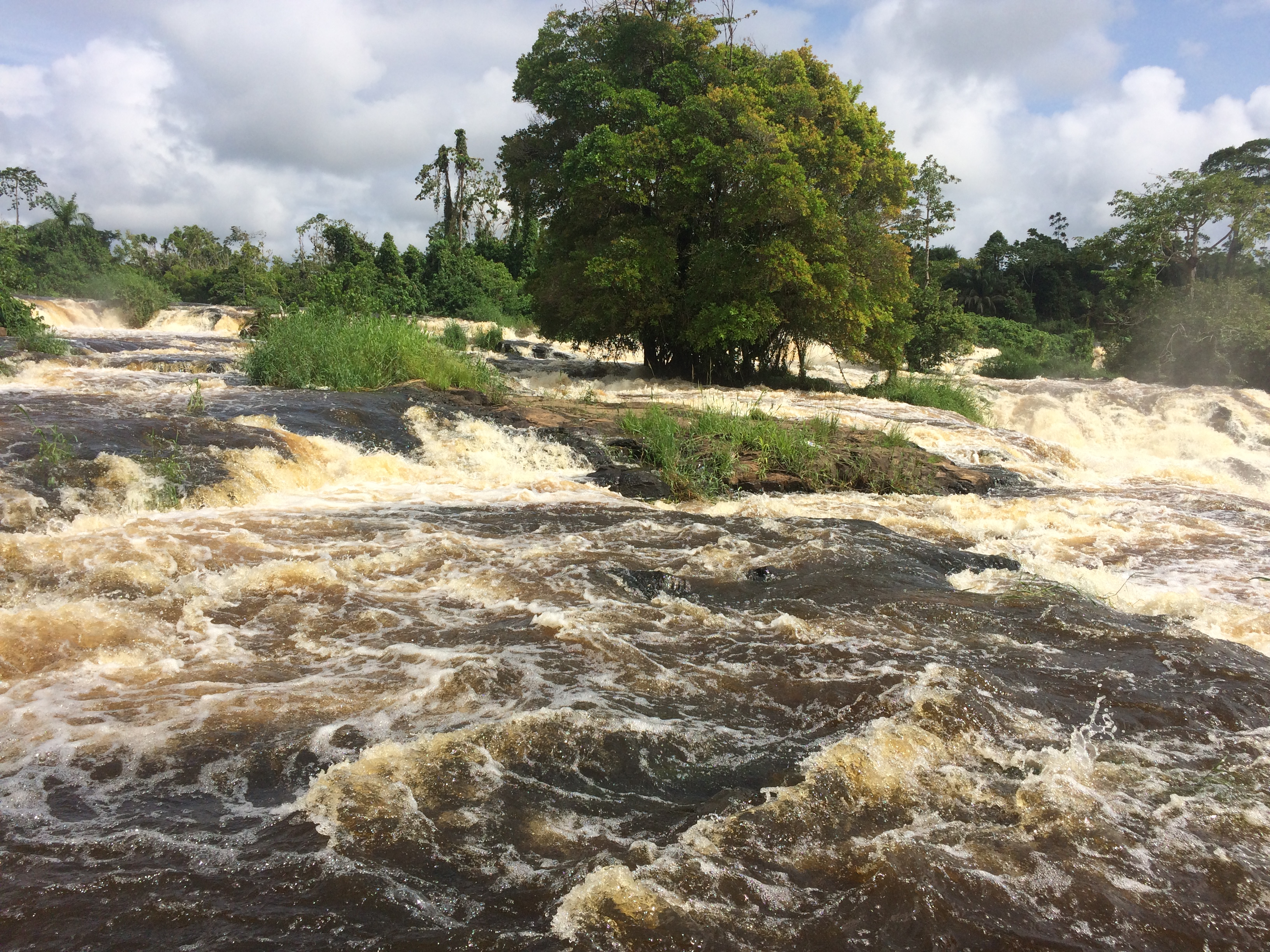
Lobé Falls

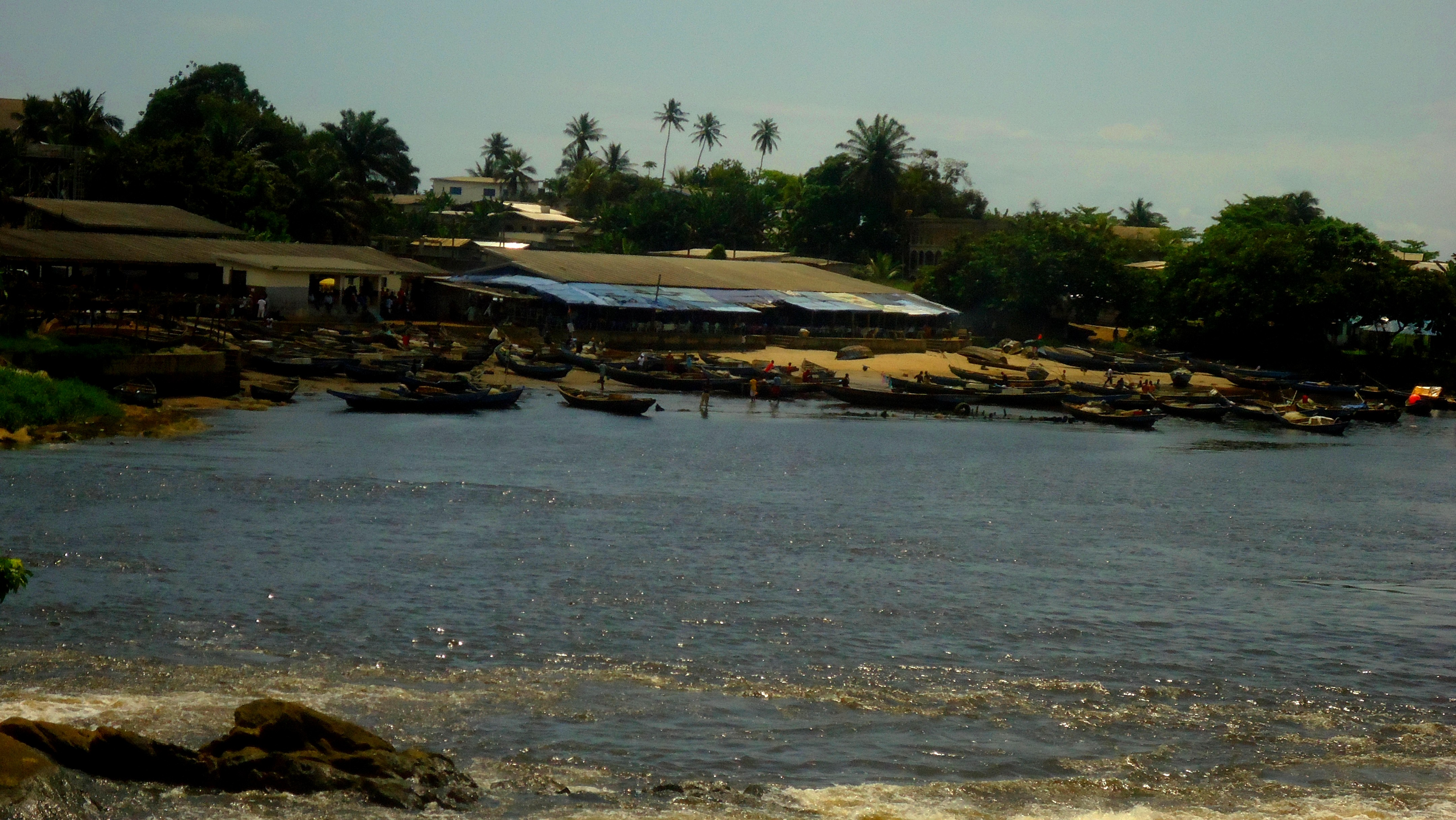
Kibi Débarcadère

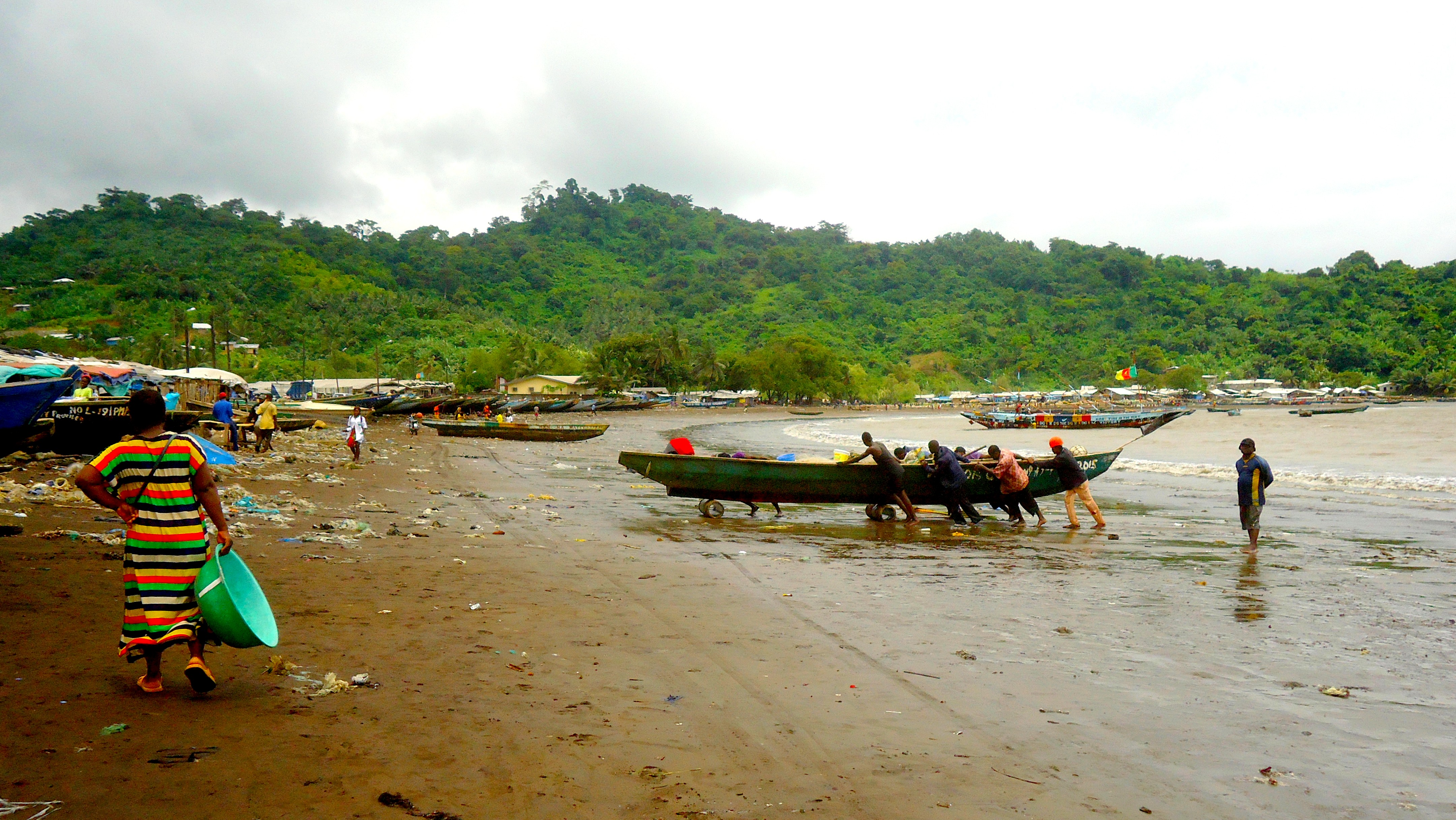
Kribi Down Beach

== Administration and social conditions ==
With the opening of the Chad-Cameroon pipeline in 2003, the population of the South Region only promises to grow as more industry moves to the area, particularly the coast, making the South an important target for Cameroonian politicians.

President Paul Biya, himself a Bulu from a village near Sangmélima, enjoys widespread support in the South due to its place as the heart of Bululand. However, Biya has often been accused of showing favouritism toward members of the Bulu and closely related Beti groups, and a disproportionate number of Bulu and Beti today work in the civil service, in government posts, or in state-owned businesses. On the other hand, Biya has repeatedly shown intolerance of any opposition from his Bulu-Beti base. In 1996, for example, South Region native and Biya aide Titus Edzoa announced his candidacy for the presidency and was arrested on embezzlement charges, apparently at Biya's urging.

=== Government ===
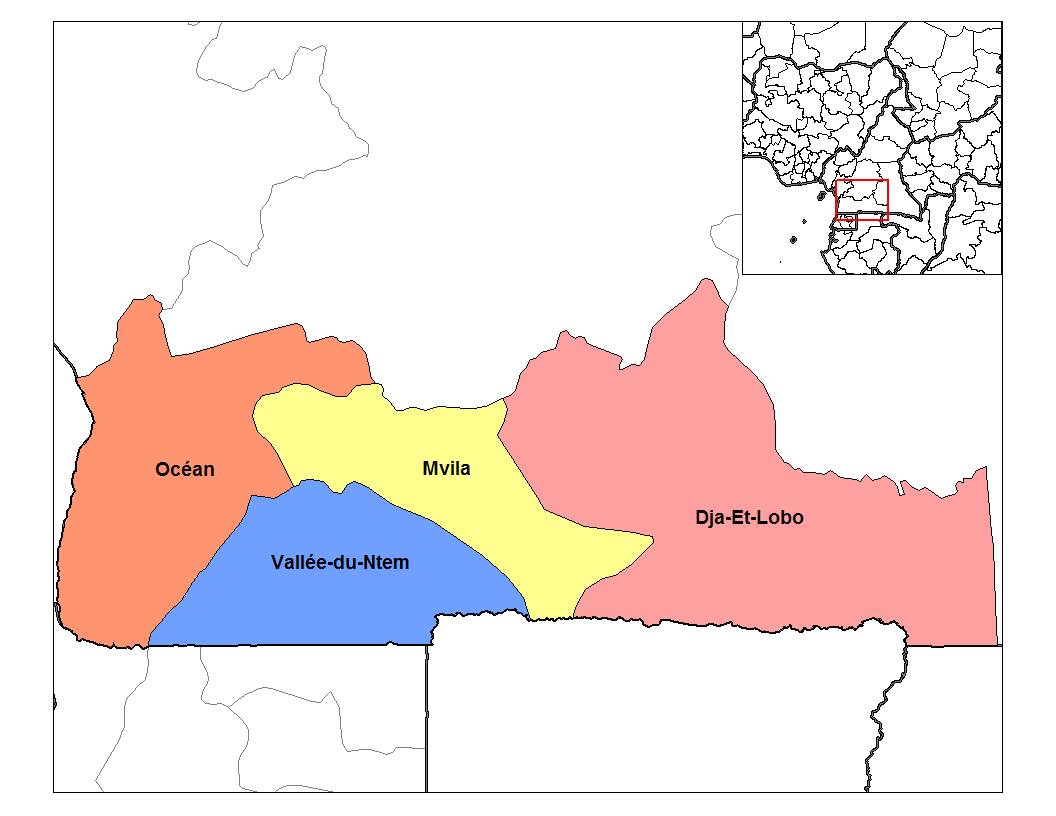
Divisions of South Region

The capital of the region is Ebolowa, where the presidentially appointed governor has his offices. The region is further divided into four departments (départements), also called divisions, each under the supervision of a presidentially appointed prefect (préfet) or senior divisional officer.

The Océan department is the farthest west, located on the coast and administered from Kribi. Bordering this are the Vallée-du-Ntem (Ntem-Valley) department, governed from Ambam, and the Mvila department, headed from Ebolowa. Farthest east is the Dja-et-Lobo (Dja and Lobo) department, with Sangmélima its capital.

The Beti-Pahuin and other ethnic groups in the South have little traditional political organisational structure. Instead, groups of families are loosely organised into clans under a single patriarch. During the French colonial period, the Bulu formed a tribal union of their various clans. Today, these elders hold little actual power, and most such positions are merely honorary.

=== Education ===
There are 972 schools in the territory. Most of these are located in the area's larger towns and villages. Attendance numbers diminish as one moves into the area's frontiers, particularly the vast, forested areas south of Ebolowa and Sangmélima. Here, students are expected to walk long distances to attend school each day, or else to stay with relatives or alone in towns where schools are located. This problem is not as pronounced at the level of primary school, as these tend to be more widely distributed even in the remoter areas. Nevertheless, all schools in the region tend to be overcrowded.

=== Health ===
Poor sanitation is perhaps the South Region's greatest health hazard. Many villages have no access to running water, and even areas that do have it must contend with outbreaks of amoebic dysentery, bacterial dysentery, brucellosis, giardia, hepatitis A, and schistosomiasis. In 2004, the relatively developed town of Kribi suffered a major cholera epidemic.

As it is almost entirely forested, the South supports many disease-carrying organisms. Malaria-bearing mosquitoes are one such pest, and the disease is a major health hazard in the region. Other parasitic diseases found in the South include dengue fever, falariasis, tuberculosis, and typhoid fever.

Hospitals and clinics are fairly widespread, but they are mostly located in larger towns and cities. Traditional medicine is thus still the major source of treatment for many of the South's citizens, particularly those in more remote locations. Witchcraft is still blamed for many maladies, including HIV and AIDS in many cases.

== History ==
=== Early population movements ===
Archaeological finds in the areas of Kribi and Lobé attest to human presence in the territory of the South Province since prehistory. Of the area's current inhabitants, the earliest to arrive were the Pygmies, who moved in from further south and east in ancient times and lived for centuries as hunter-gatherers in the forests. The Batanga arrived and settled the coastal areas in the 18th century.

The Beti-Pahuin Bantu groups entered the area in the 19th century from the northeast, south of the Sanaga River. They were under pressure from the migrating Vute, Mbum, Babouti, and Gbaya, who were themselves fleeing the Fulbe (Fula). The Beti-Pahuin were more militarily advanced than the natives they encountered, and they easily subdued and assimilated these peoples or else pushed them away, as with the Ngumba and Mabea, descendants of the Maka and Njem, who had traveled southwest toward the coast when the Beti-Pahuin had first encountered them a century earlier north of the Lom River. The Beti-Pahuin may have practiced cannibalism at this time, as well.

Once across the Sanaga, in present-day East and Centre Provinces, the various tribal groups settled individually in family groups, or clans. The Ntumu, Fang, and Mvae moved toward the Dja valley and into present-day Gabon while the Bulu travelled west along the Nyong to their present territory. The Beti formed the final wave.

=== European contacts ===
Europeans knew the entire western coast of the present-day South Province since Portuguese ships first explored it in 1472. The Portuguese set up trade with the natives, collecting particularly pepper, ivory, kola nuts, and slaves. Other Europeans followed the Portuguese, and the Dutch became the most active by the 17th century. Minor trading centers emerged, including Kribi and Campo. Trade was carried out on the Europeans' ships, allowing the coastal tribes to set themselves up as go-betweens, finding slaves from the interior and distributing goods obtained from the Europeans. In fact, the Beti-Pahuin migration was still taking place during this time, allowing the Bulu to set themselves in such a position.

The British supplanted the Dutch as the pre-eminent traders in the region by the 19th century. This was also the period of abolition, and the British sent elements of the Royal Navy in 1827 to the Cameroonian coast to prevent further slave trading. Merchants were instead encouraged to trade in items such as ivory, rubber, and palm kernels. Under the British, trade was conducted on land, and Europeans quickly set up bases along the coast. For example, a trading post was opened in Grand Batanga in 1828 to service the lower Cameroonian coastline. Slaves continued to be traded clandestinely.

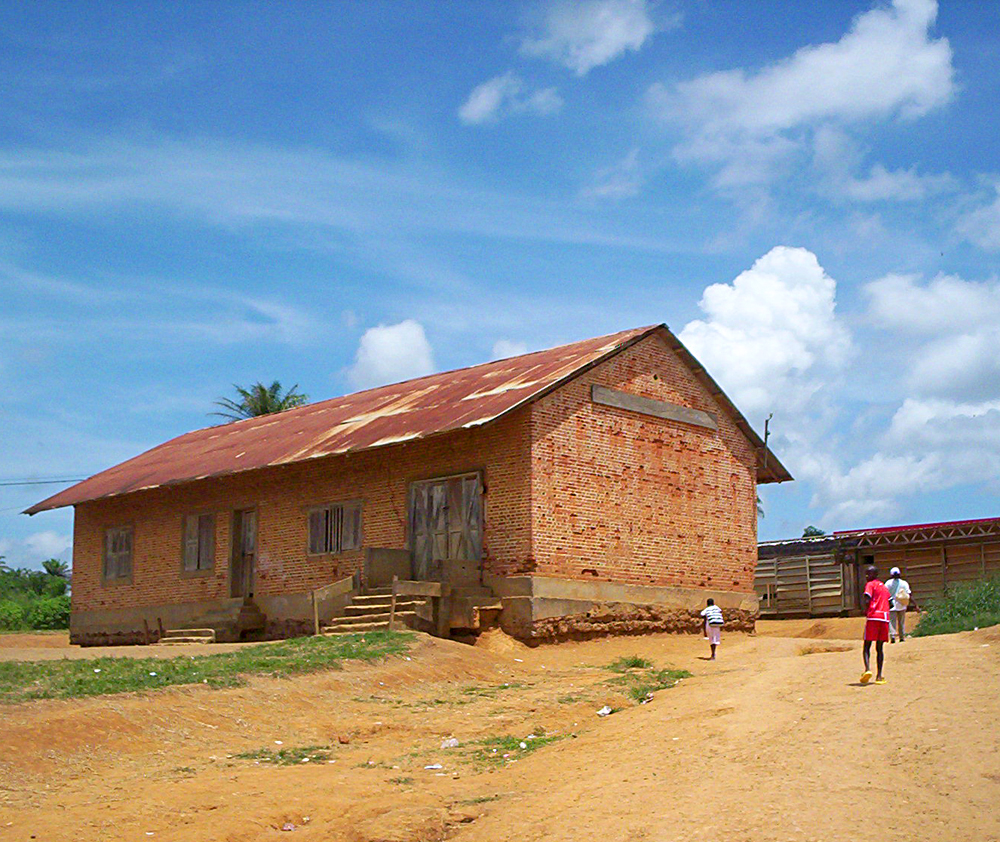
German-built building at Ambam, today used as a school

=== German administration ===
Germany annexed the Cameroons in 1884, and for the first few years, they were only interested in the coastal area. Explorers under Governor Julius Von Soden were the first to penetrate into the southern interior when they pushed in to Beti lands in 1887. Eugen Von Zimmerer followed as colonial governor with an aggressive push to build plantations, particularly to grow cocoa. Much of the road infrastructure of the province dates from Von Zimmerer's time, since the Germans needed a means of travelling along the coast and from plantation to plantation. It was largely the native population who was forced to build these improvements.

As the Germans consolidated their power and conscripted workers, they faced resistance from the indigenous peoples. Of Cameroon's southern groups, the Bulu revolted first in 1891 in protest over their loss to the Germans of their lucrative trade position. Von Zimmerer's army finally suppressed the rebellion in 1895. That same year, the Ewondo rose up until the colonials were able to suppress them in 1896. Germany also replaced native chiefs with more sympathetic ones when they deemed it necessary.

Jesko Von Pultkamer became governor of German Kamerun in 1895. He accelerated the creation of plantations through the southern forest zone, which created more need for conscripted native labourers. In 1907, the Ewondo rebelled once more, but the Germans again suppressed them.

=== French administration ===
In 1916, France gained control of most of Germany's Cameroonian territory at the end of World War I. Under French administration, the present South Province fell into the Kribi-Lolodorf-Campo district, governed from Kribi, and the Ebolowa-Akoafim district, governed from Ebolowa.

The French maintained the various German-founded plantations and started new ones, including coffee plantations at Ebolowa, palm plantations at Kribi, and groundnut fields at Batoke. They also continued Germany's policy of propping up puppet chiefs of the various native peoples. The French greatly expanded the road network through the region and improved the port at Kribi, albeit still with native forced labour.

=== Post-independence ===
Upon Cameroon's independence in 1960, the present-day Centre and South Provinces were one territory called the Centre-South. In 1982, Paul Biya became the second president of Cameroon. One of his first moves was to separate the Centre-South into the modern Centre and South Provinces in August, 1983.

== Geology ==
The West African coast has several structural basins, along with counterparts along the South American margin, which formed during the Late Jurassic to Albian-Cenomanian rifting associated with the breakup of Gondwanaland. During rifting, fluvial and marine clastic rocks plus evaporites were deposited. The Sanaga Sud Field, located in the Douala Basin, was discovered with the Sanaga Sud A-1 well in 1979, and produces from Lower Cretaceous shales and sands overlain by Upper Cretaceous shales. The gas-water contact shows up as a seismic amplitude event. .

== Culture ==
=== Traditional dance accessories ===
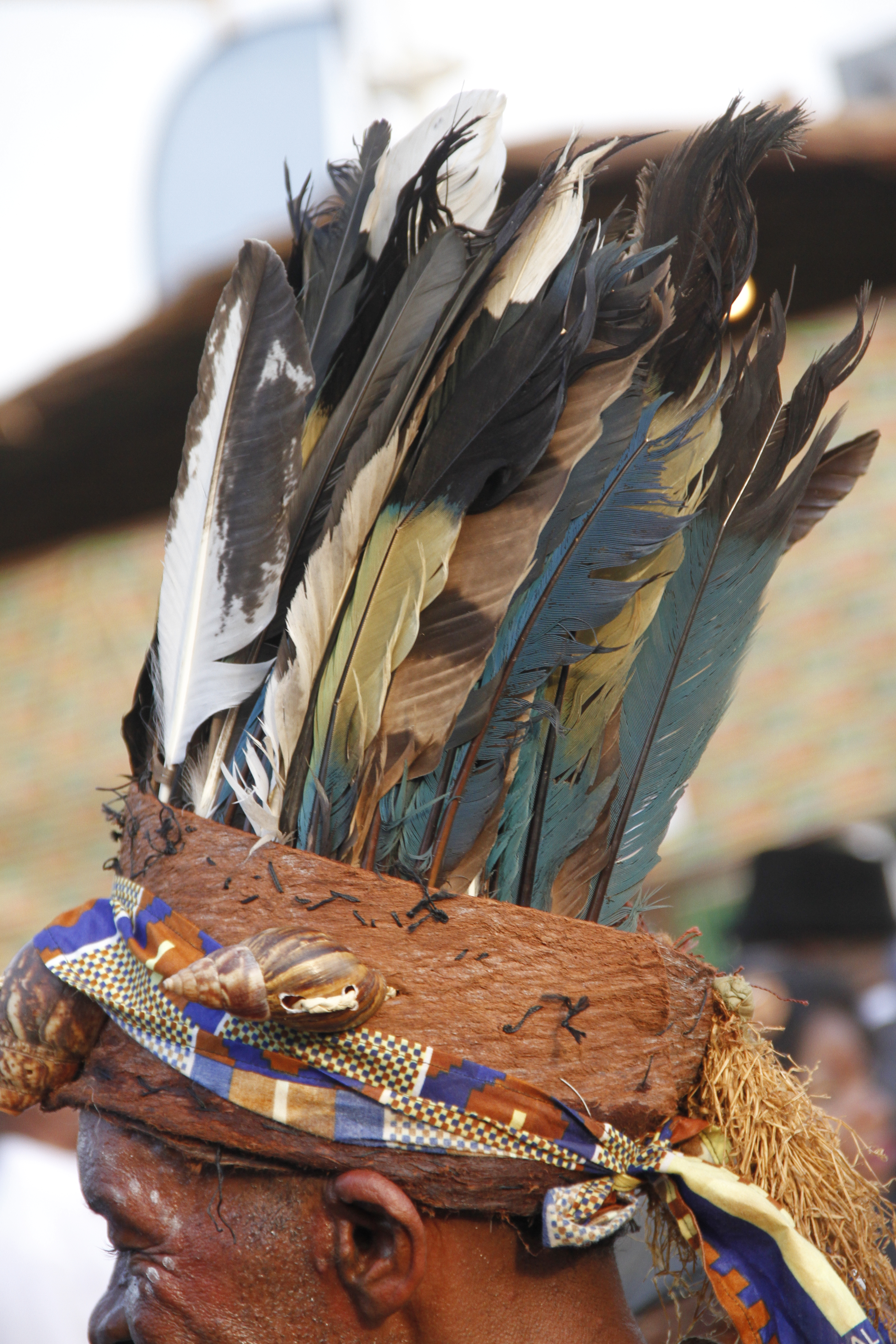

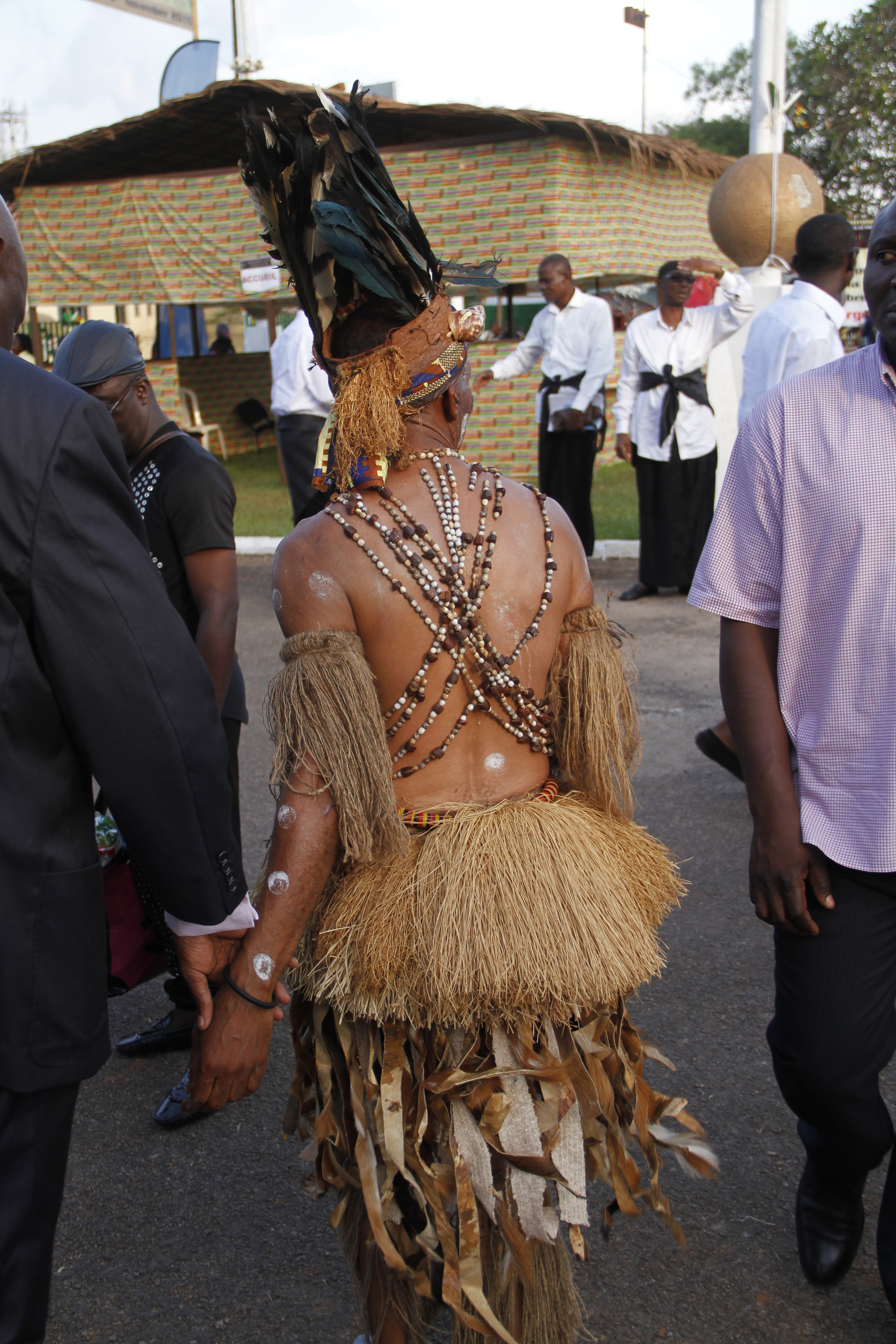

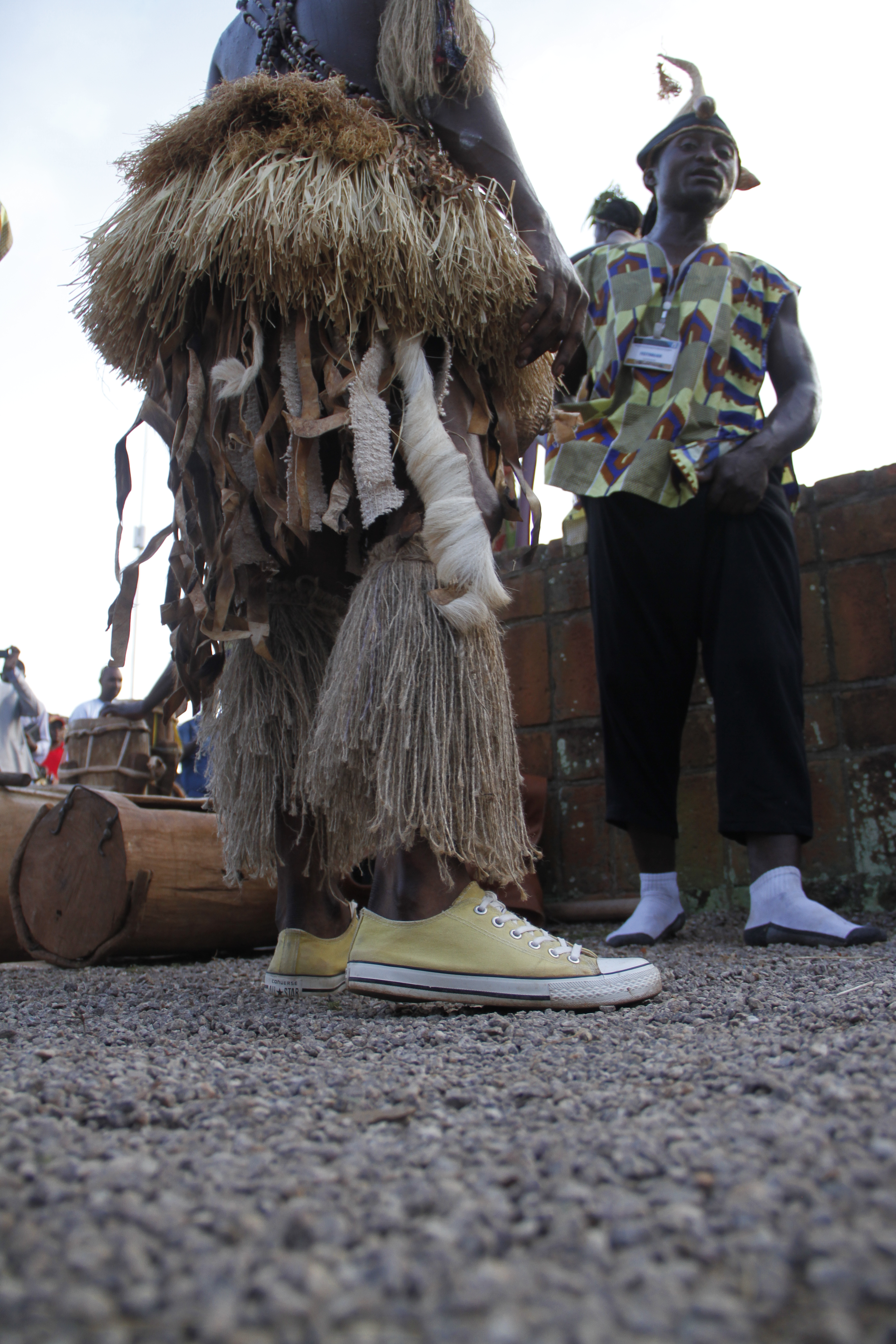

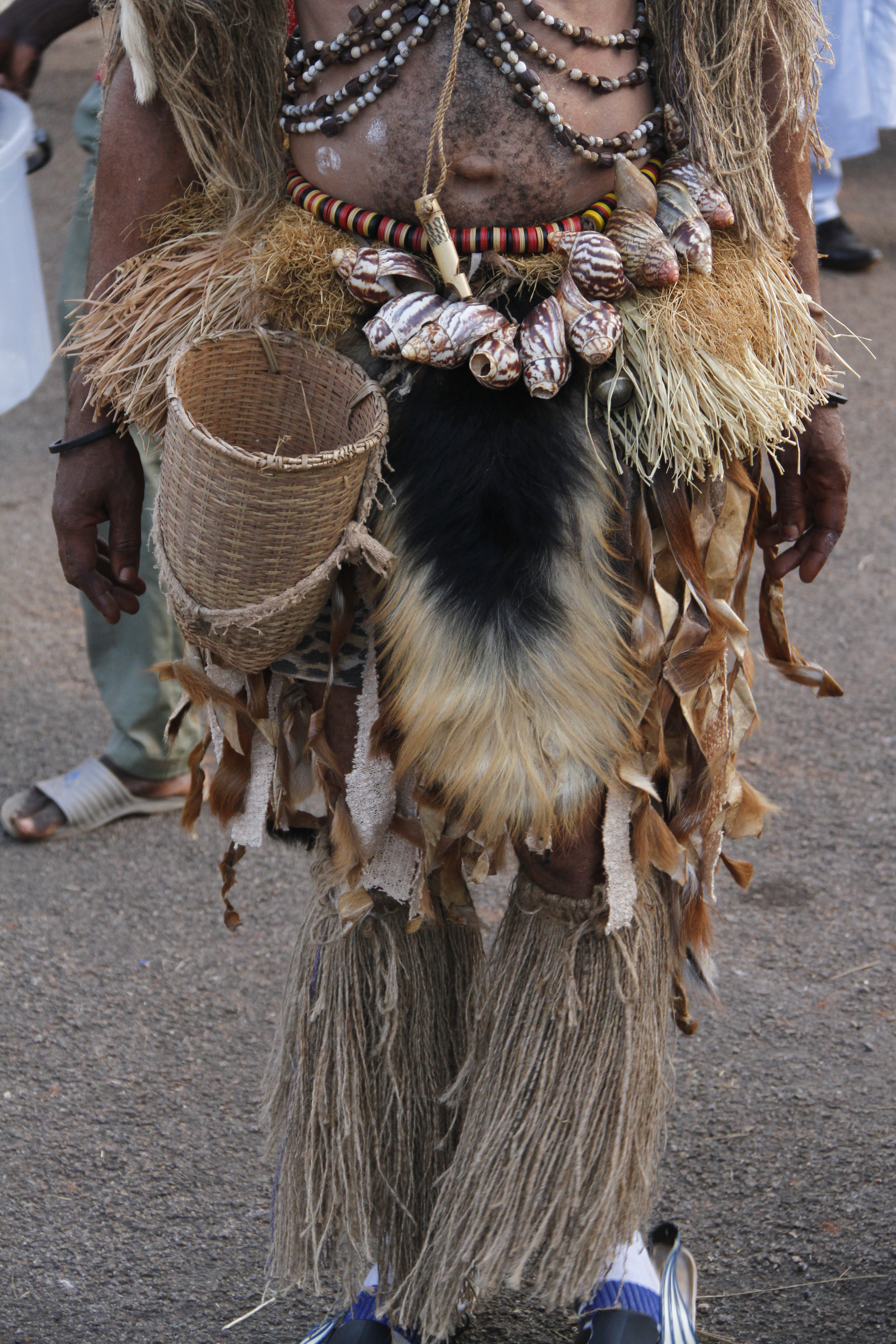

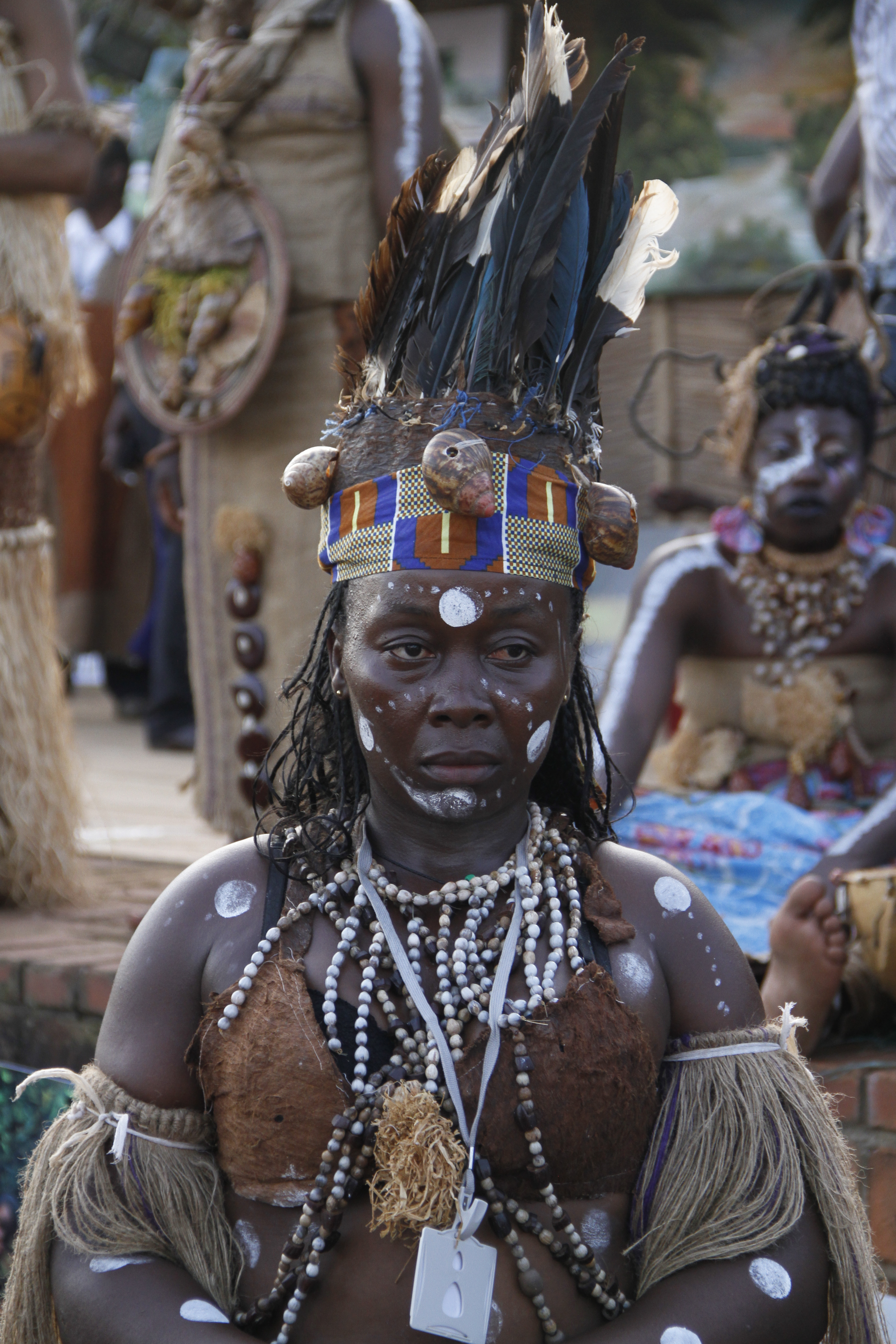

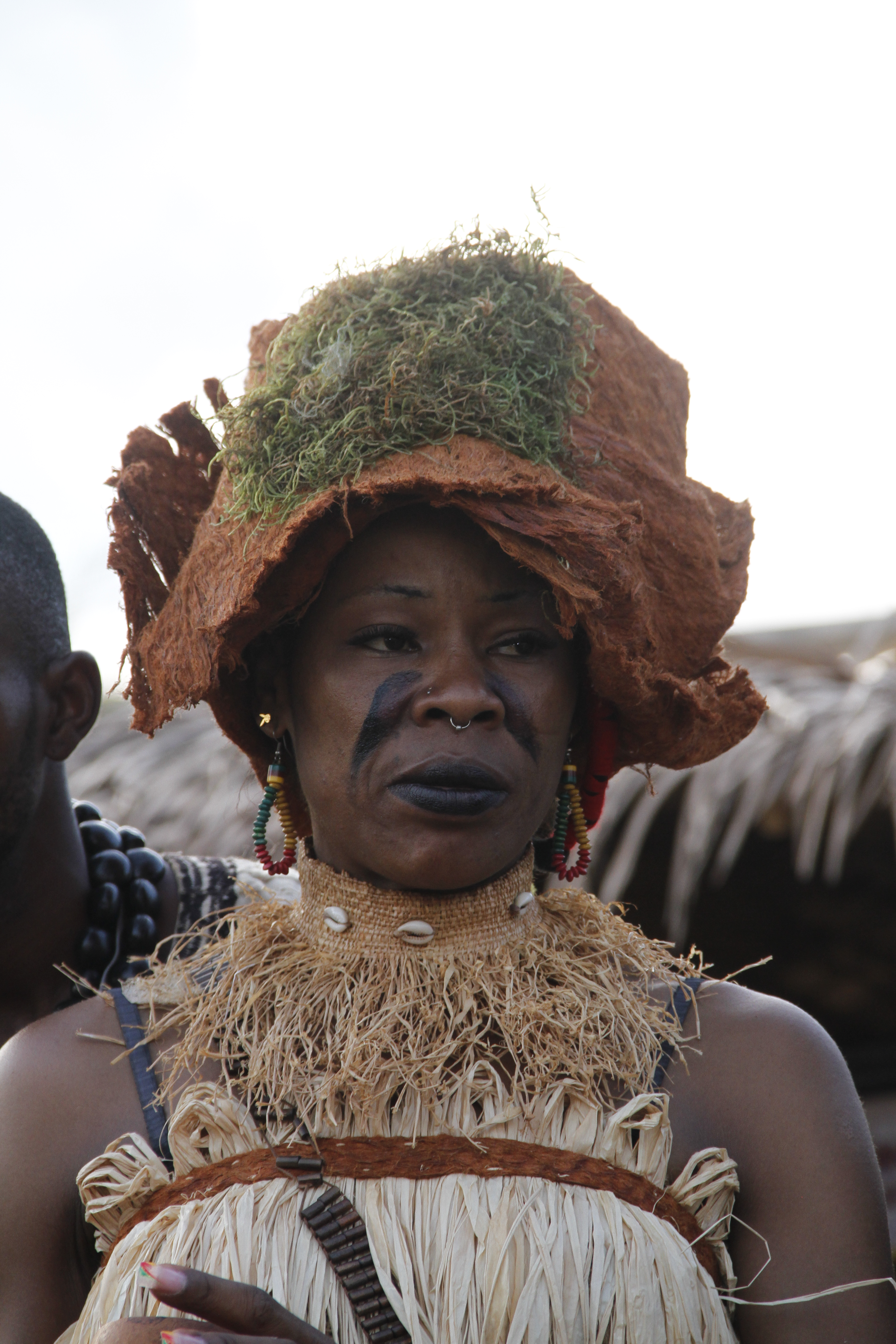

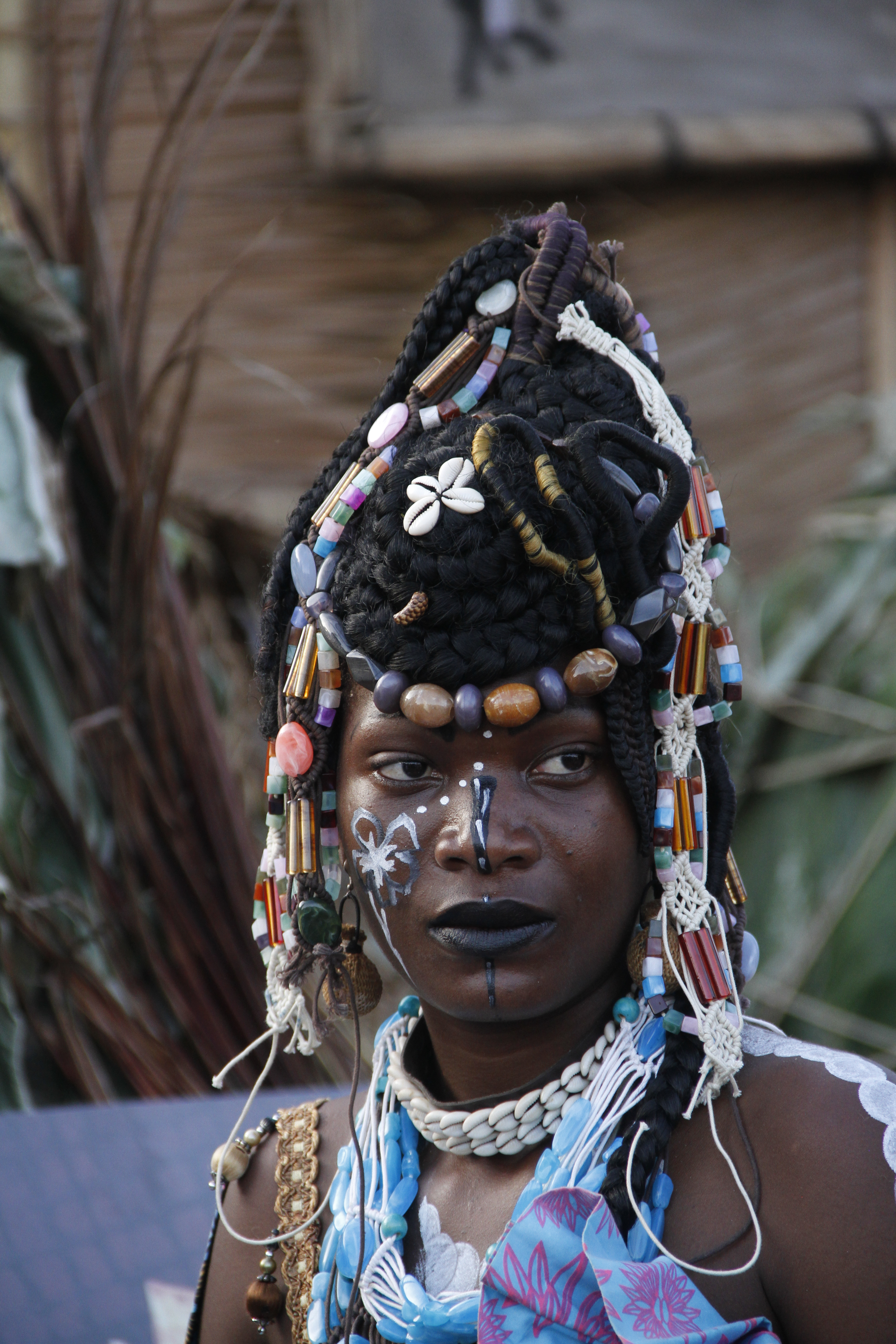

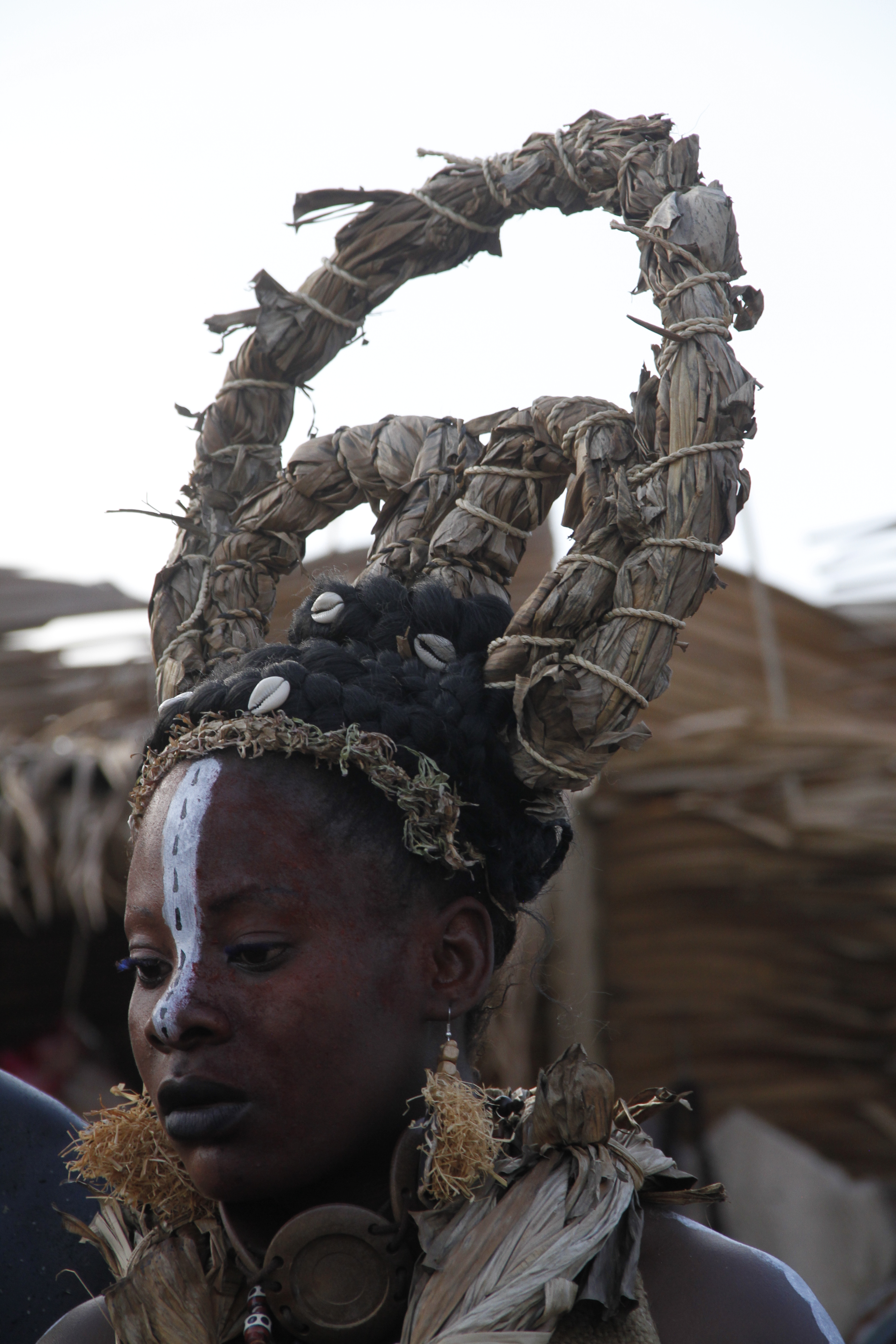

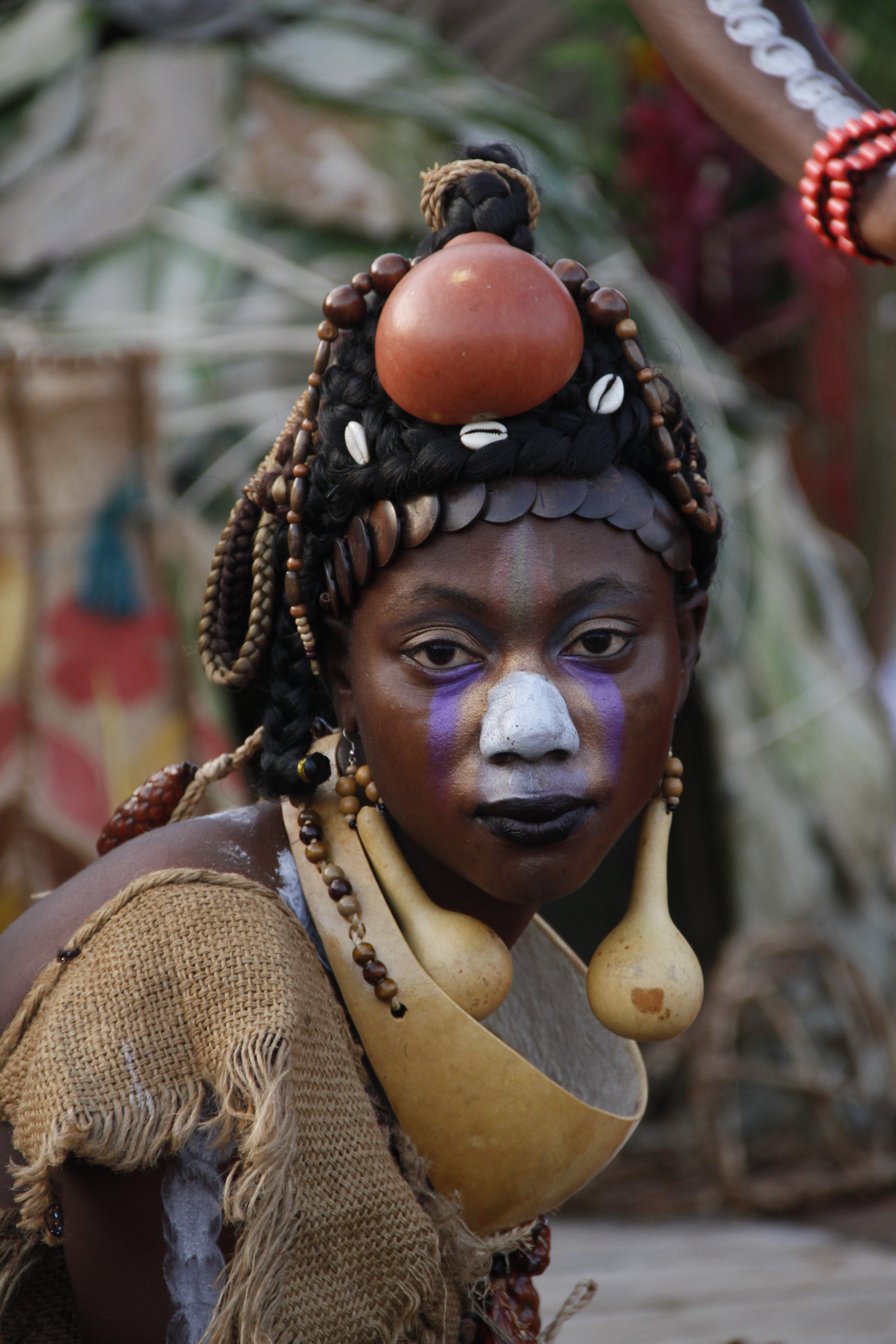

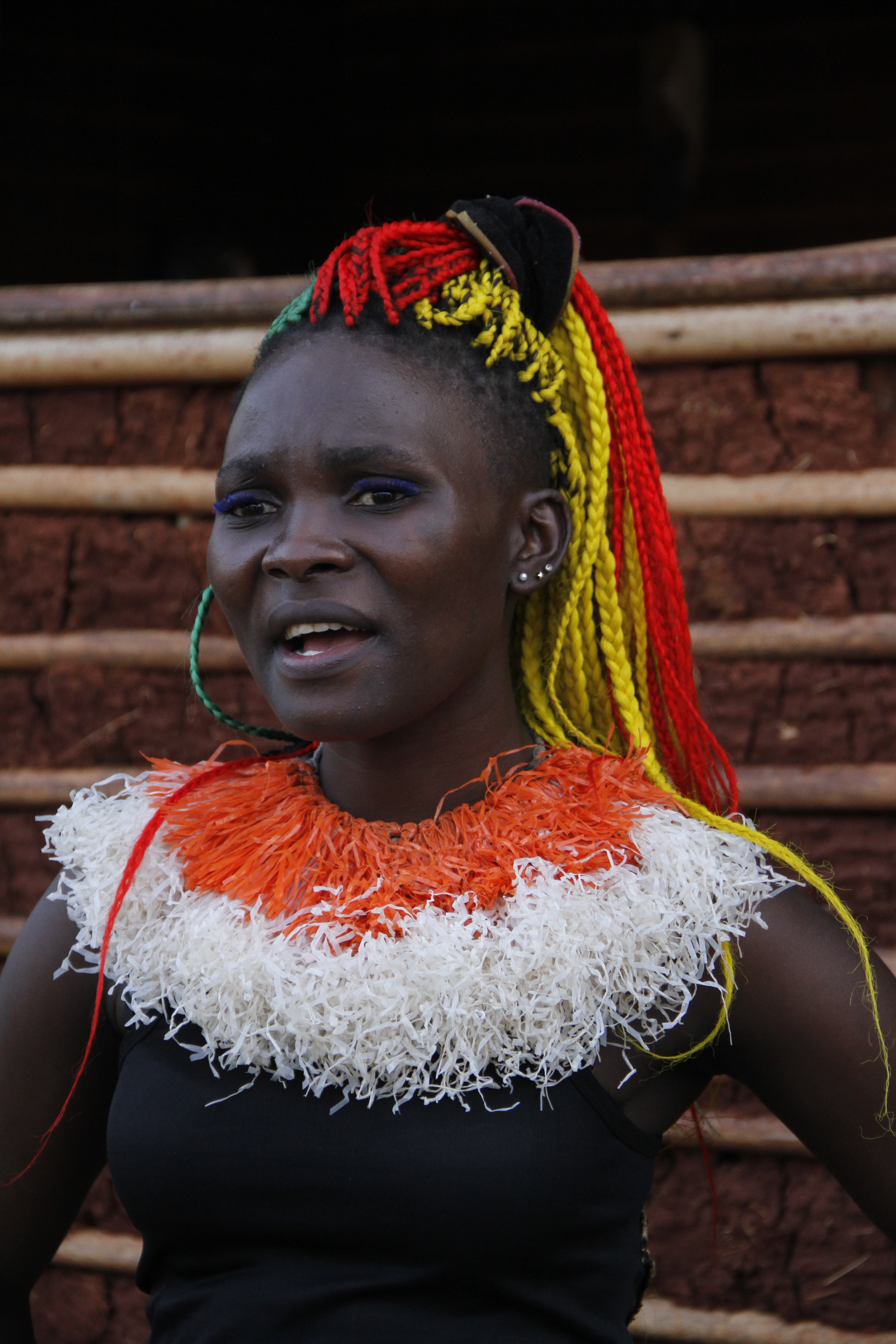

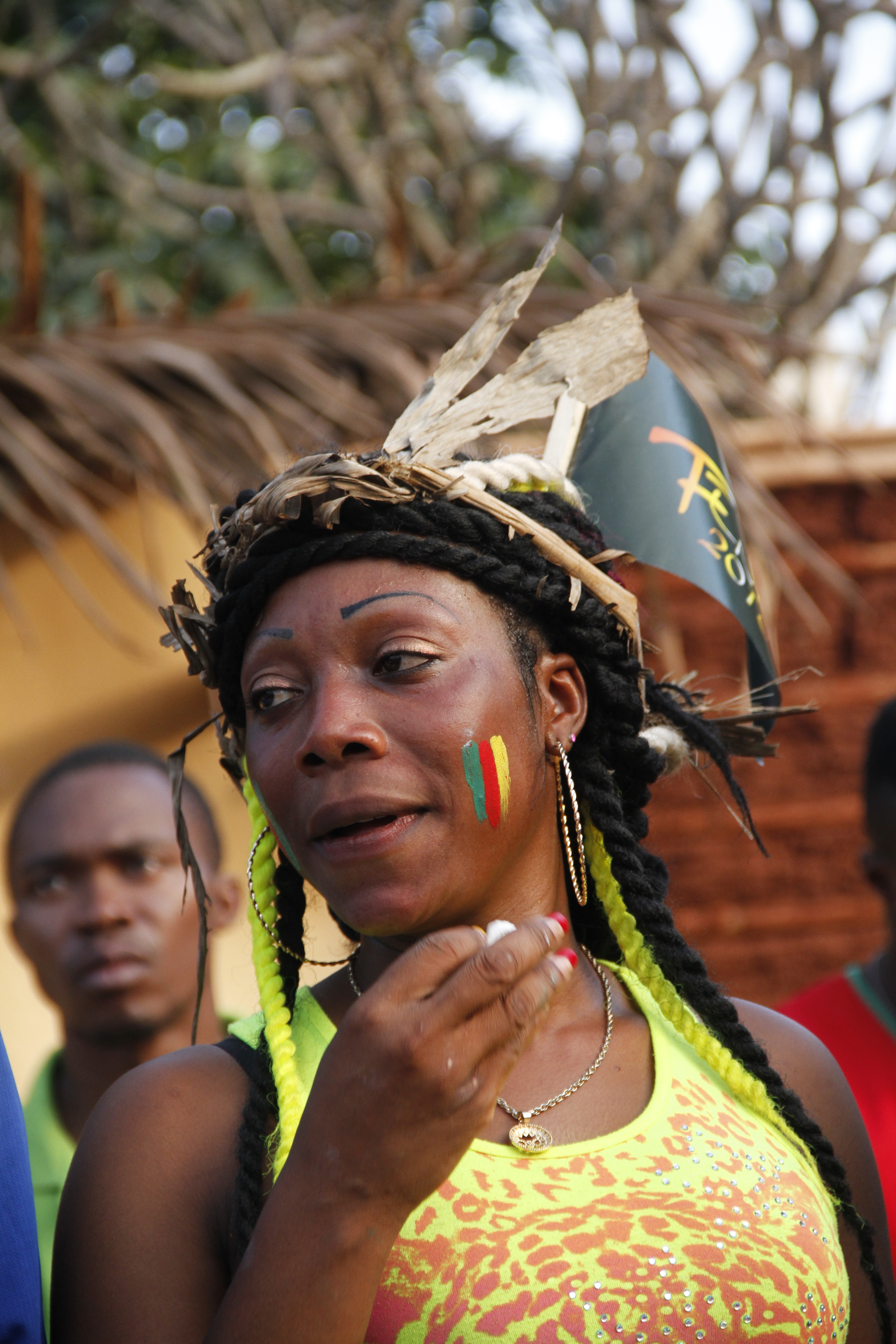

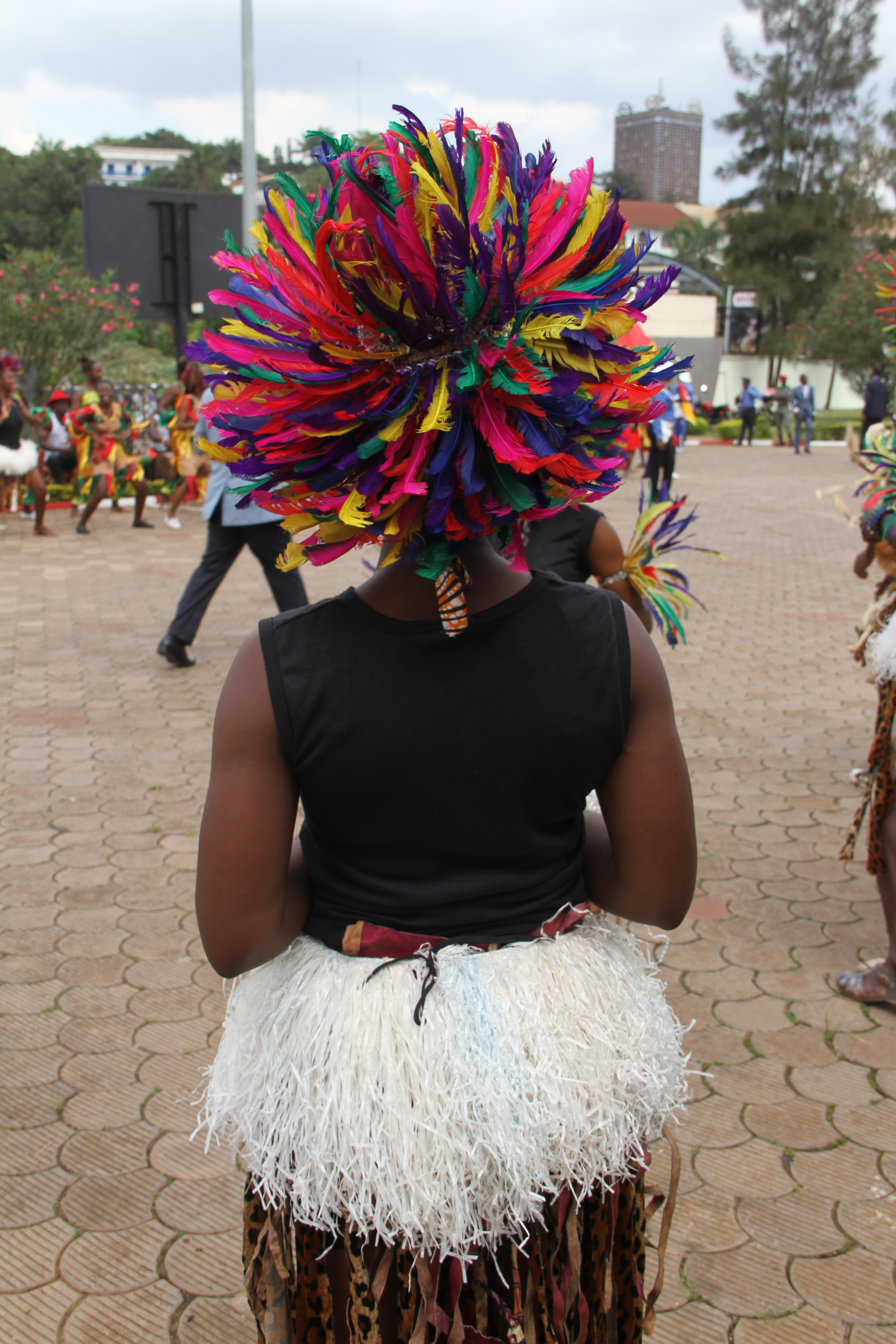

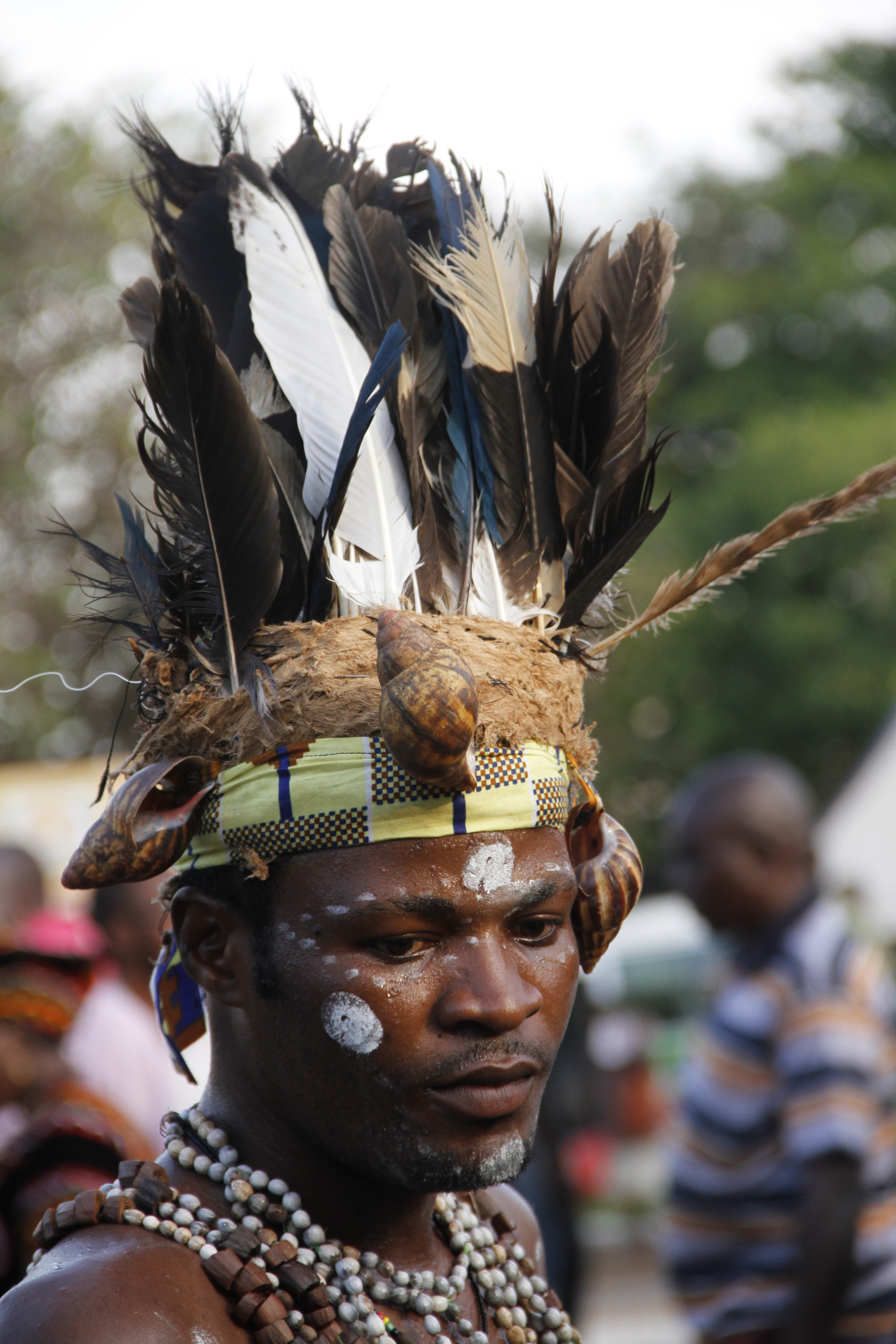

=== Traditional Dances ===
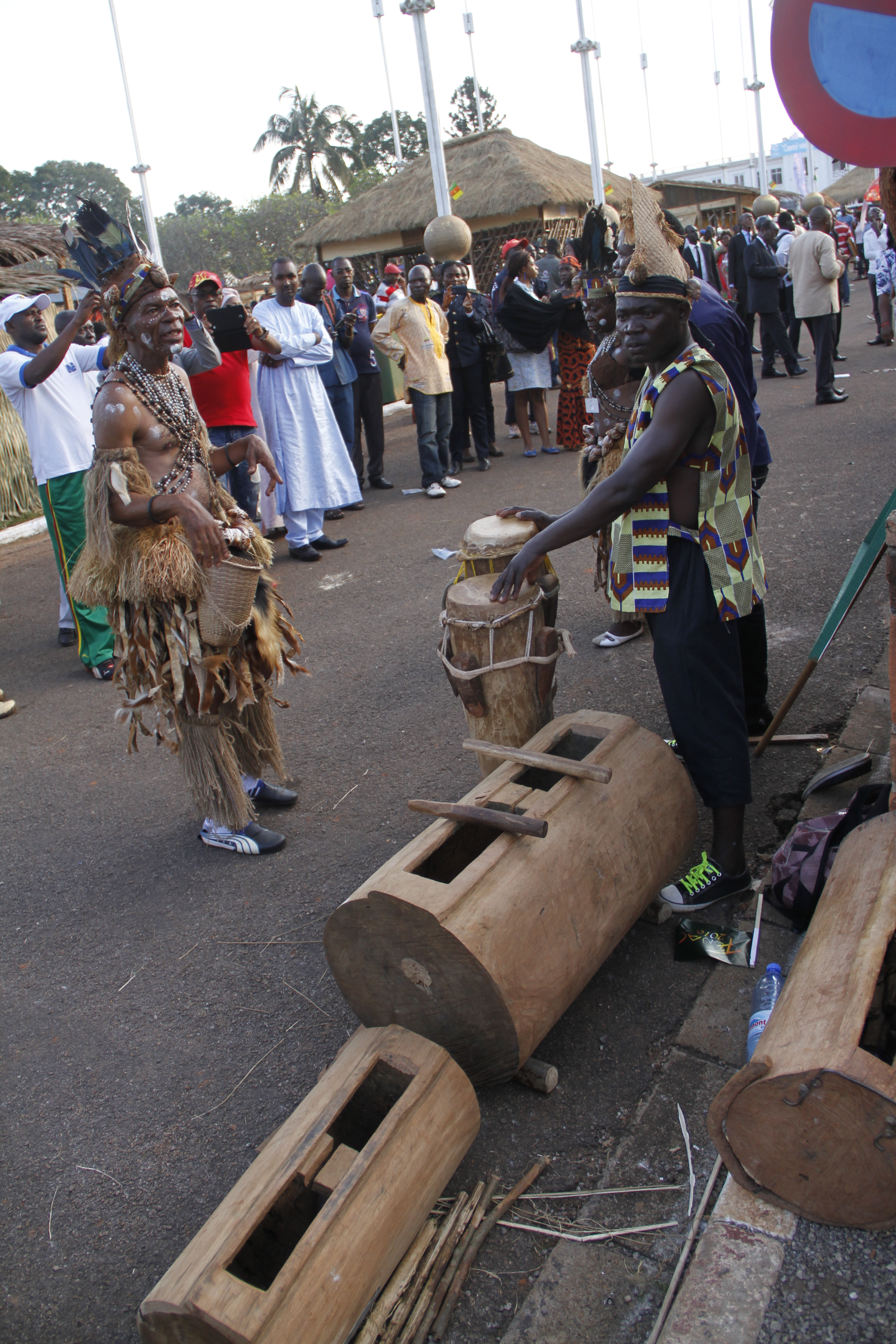

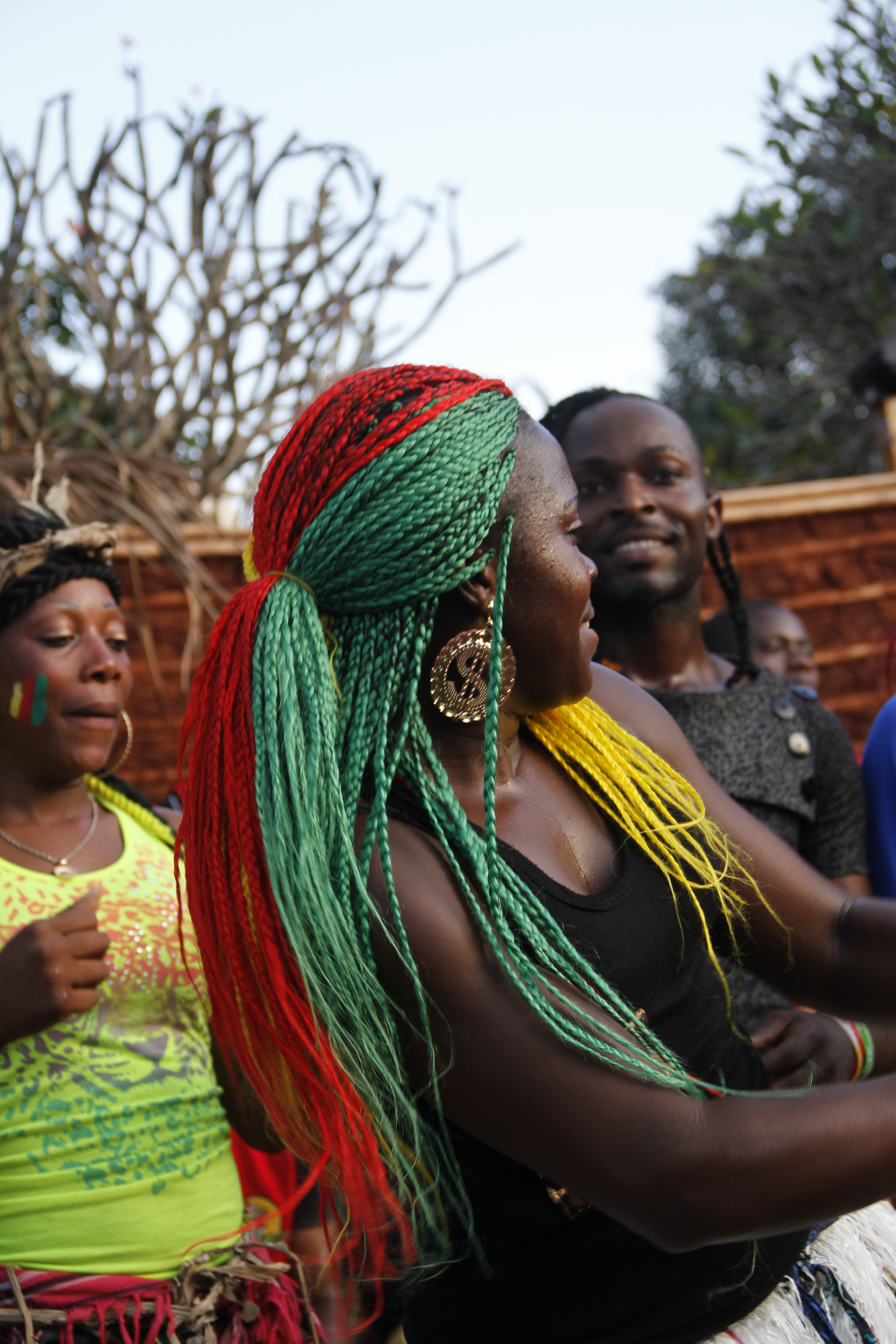

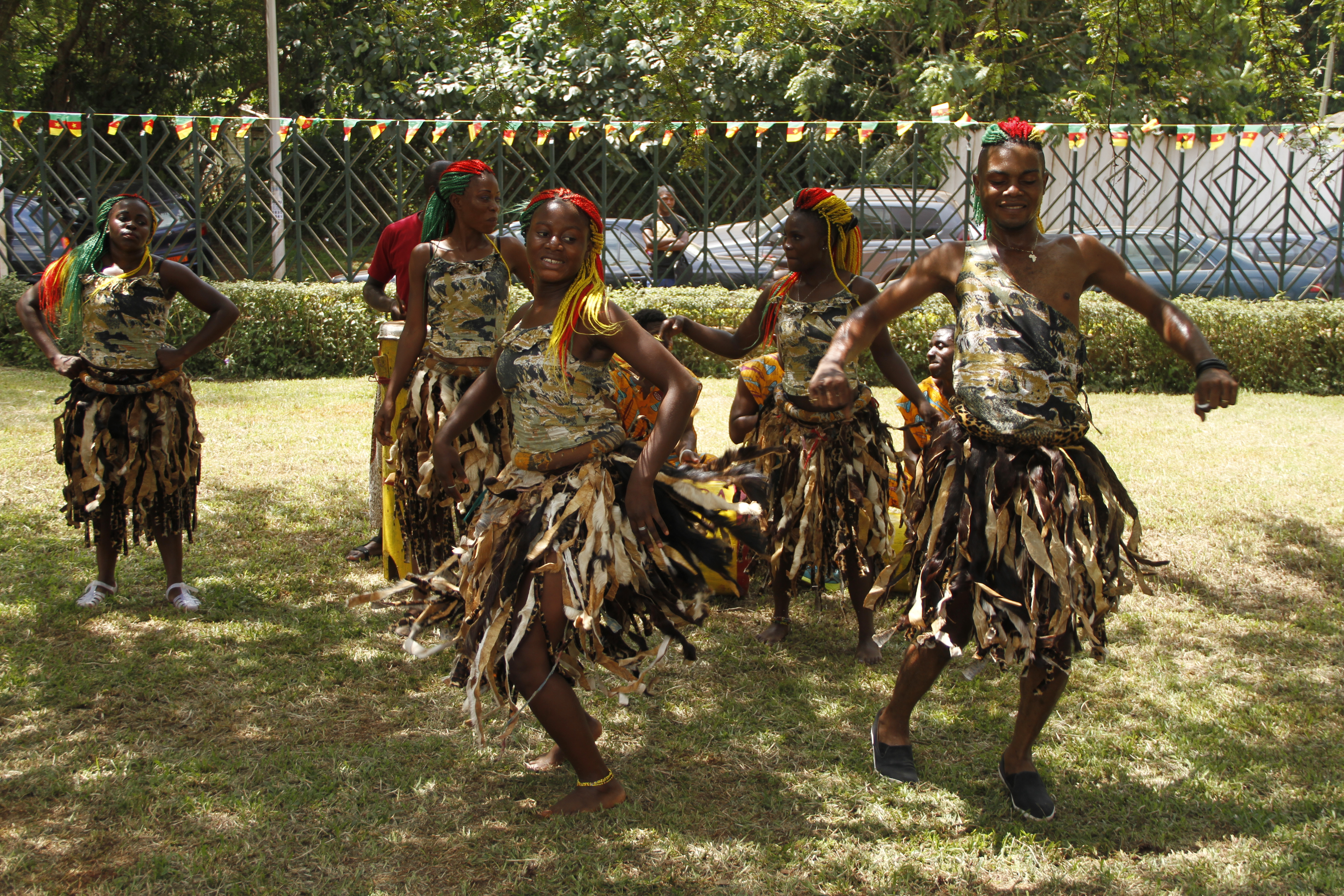

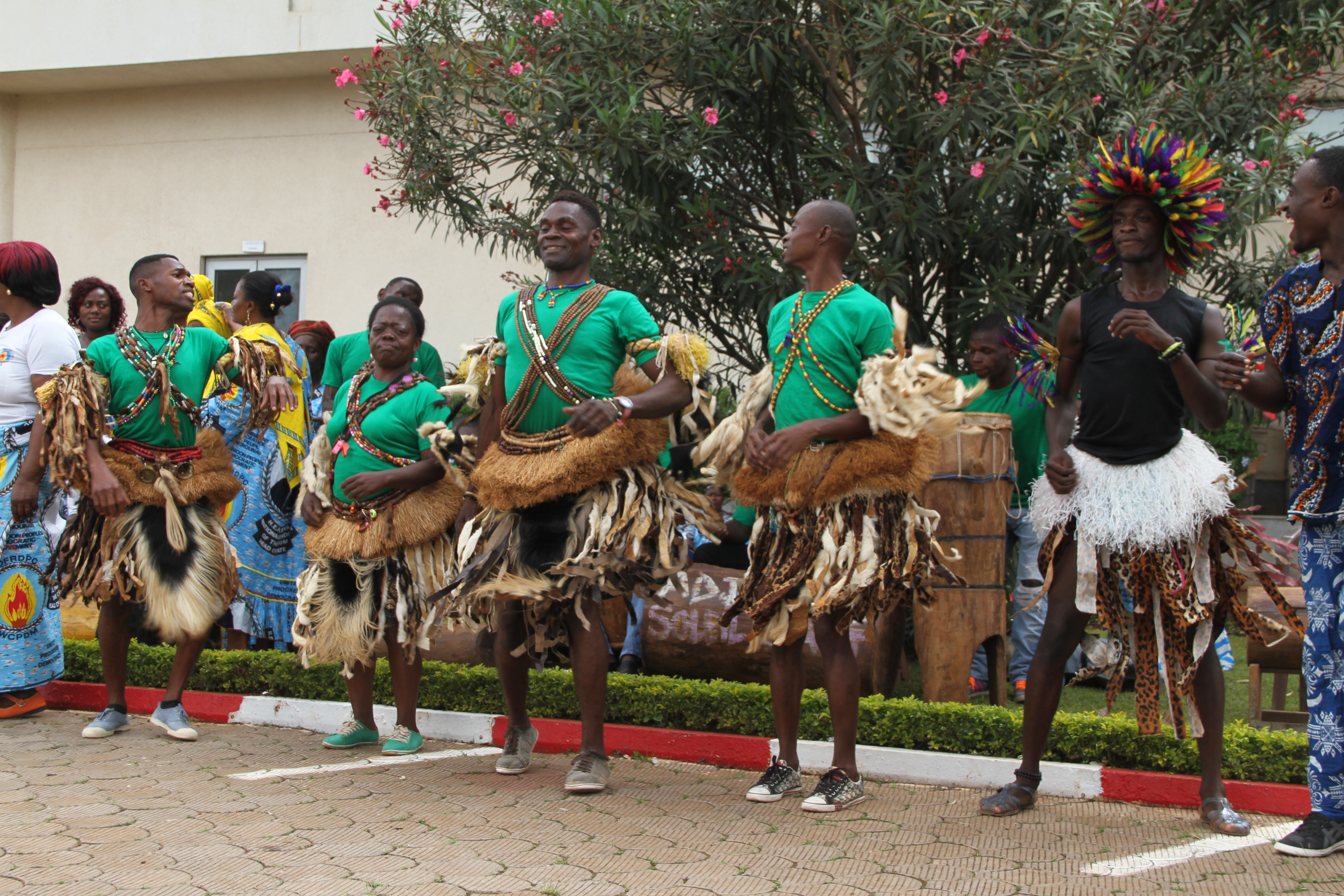

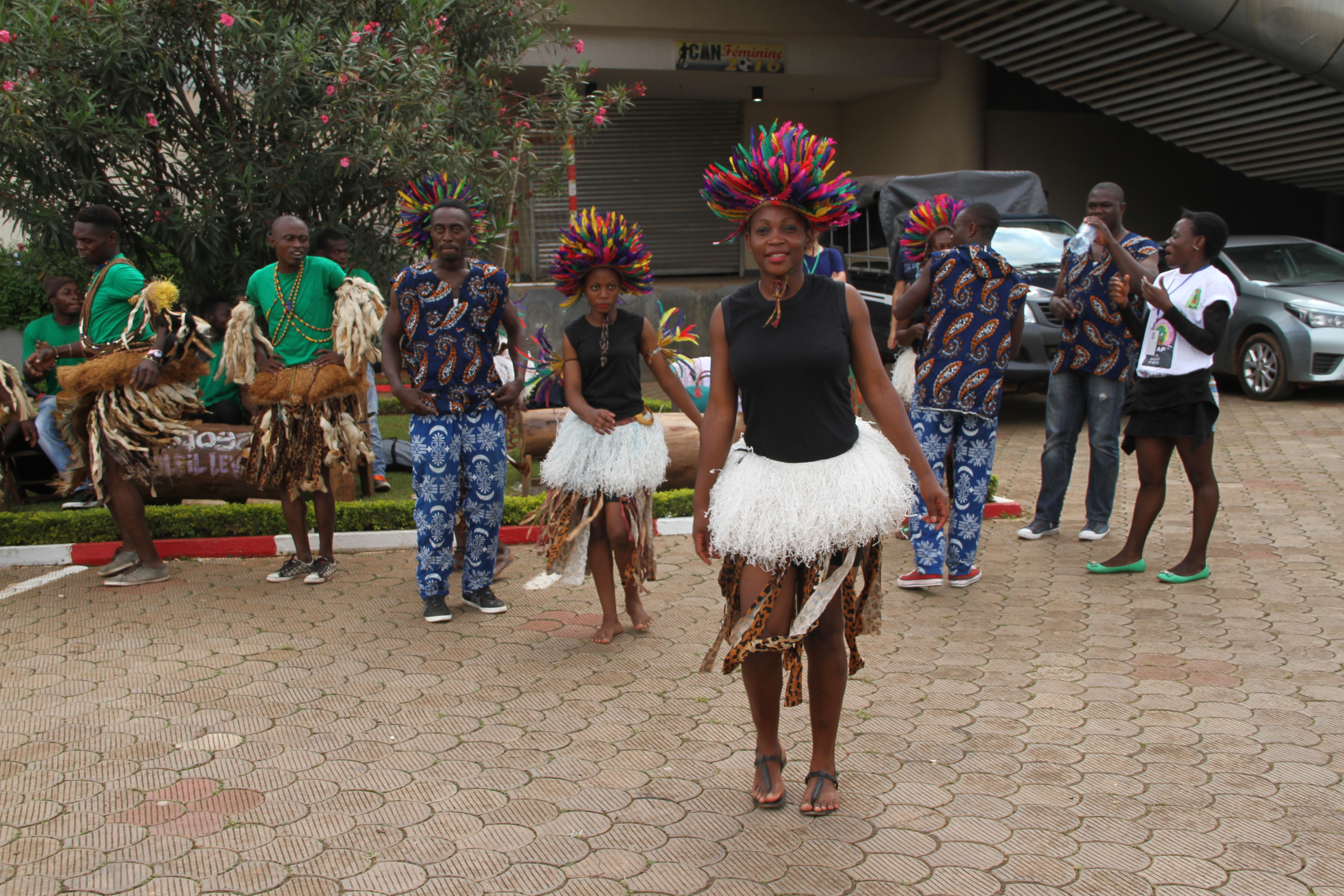

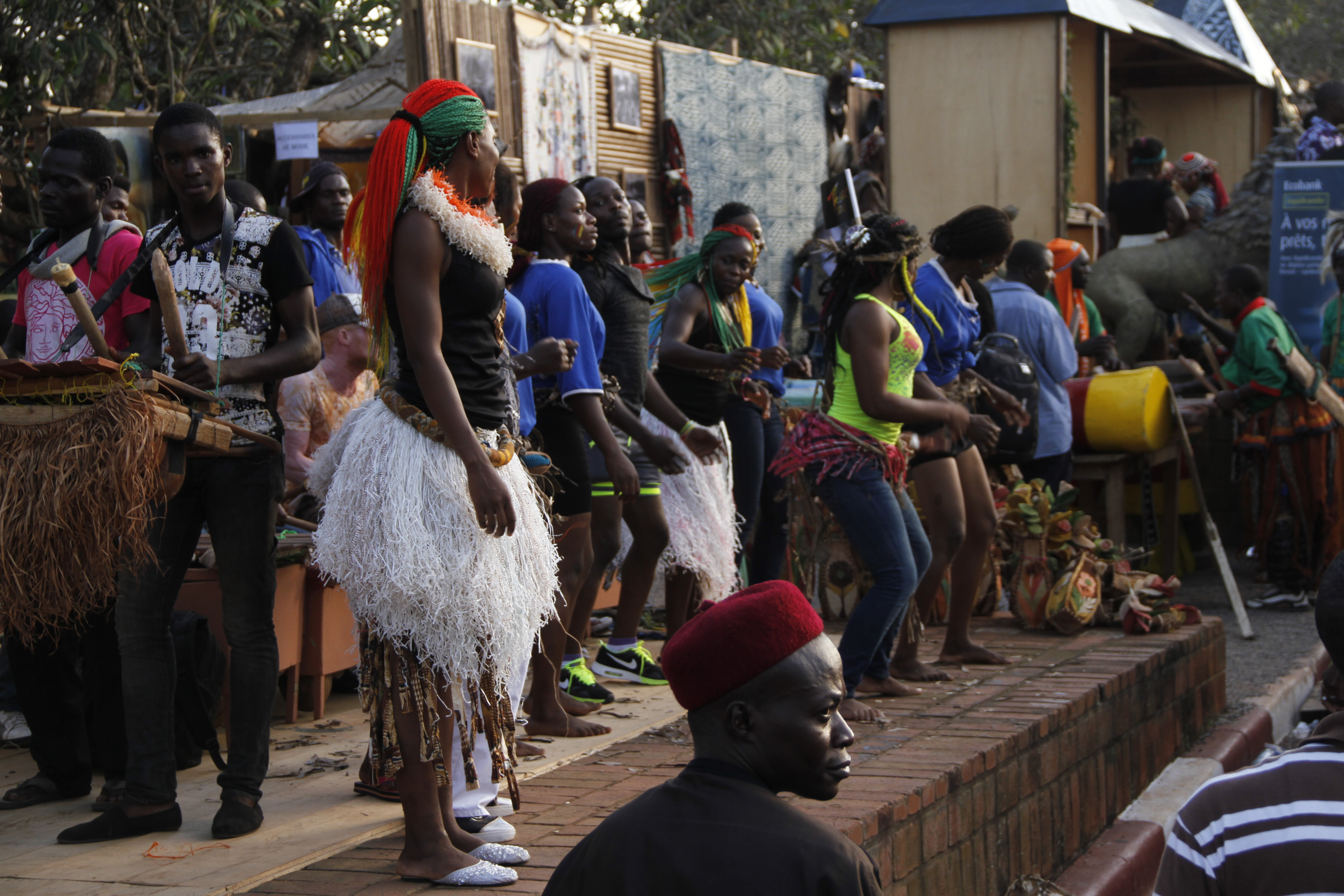

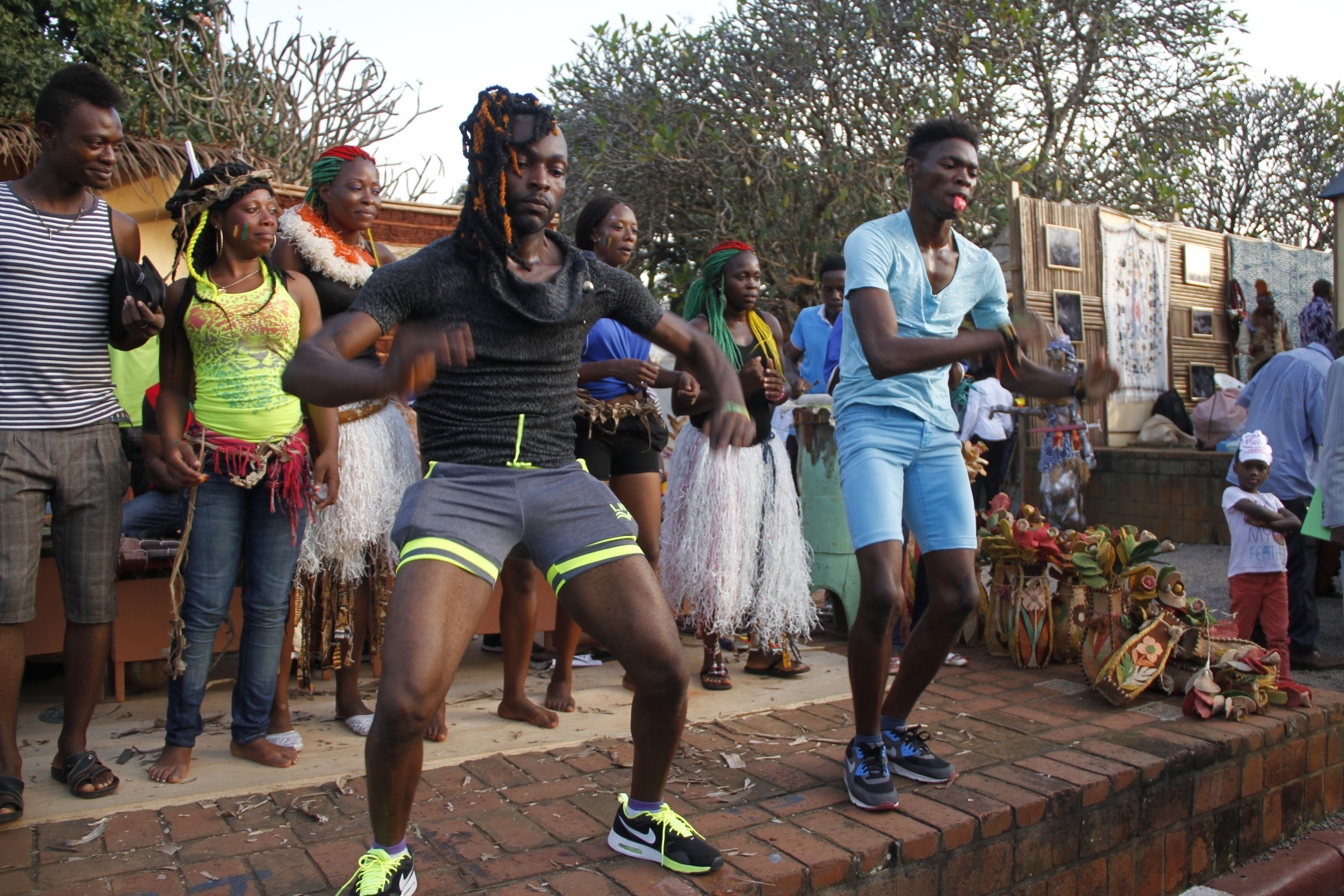

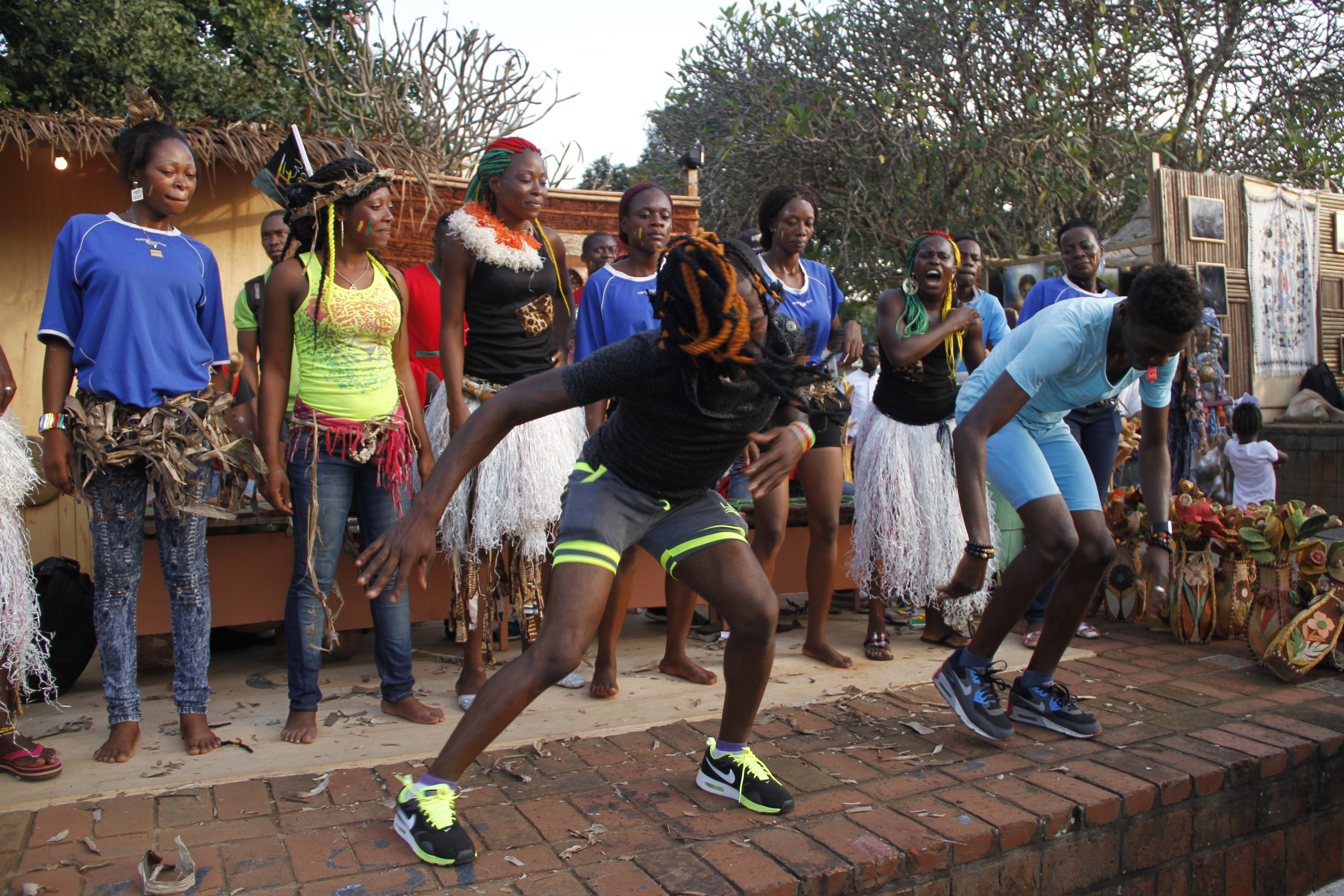

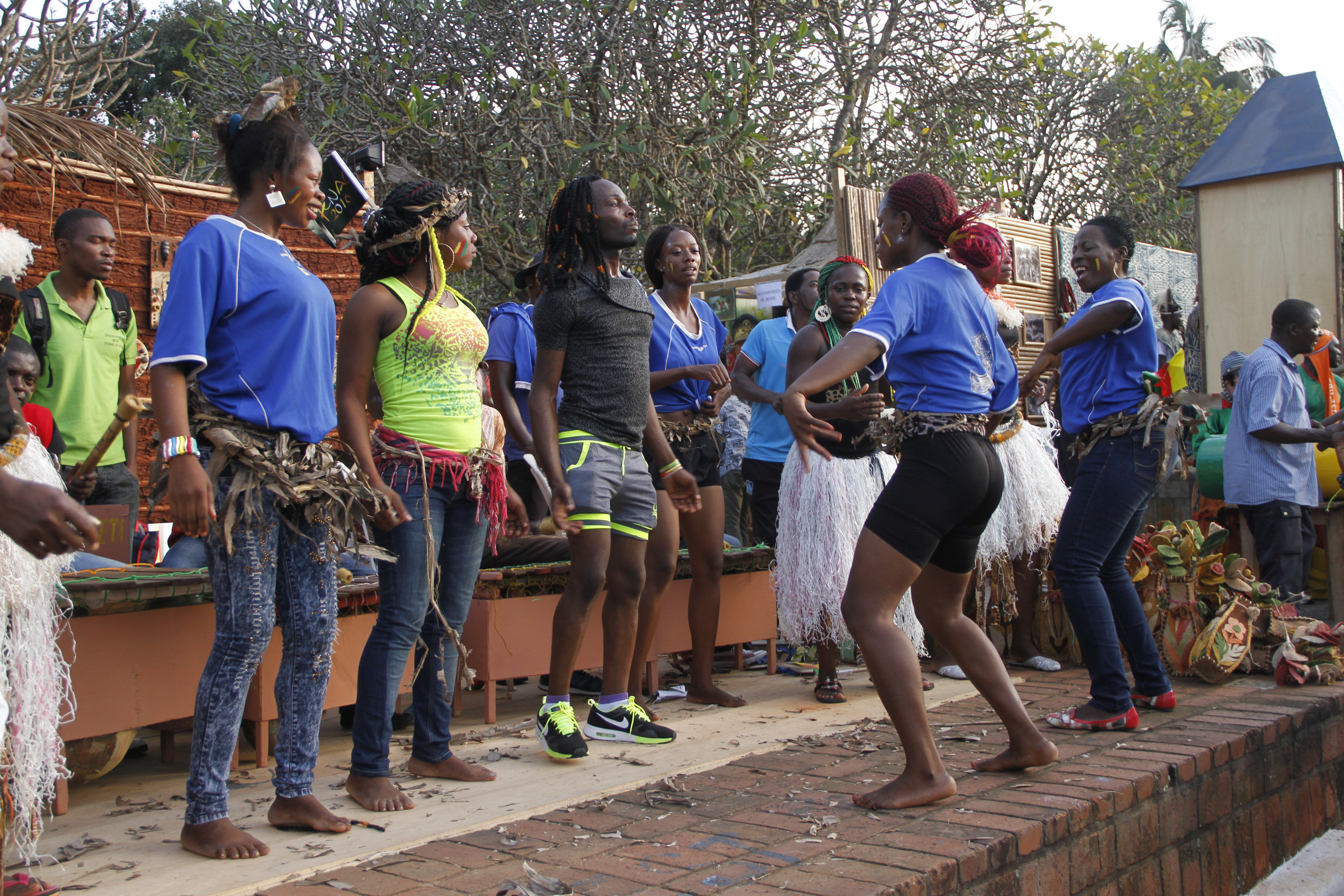

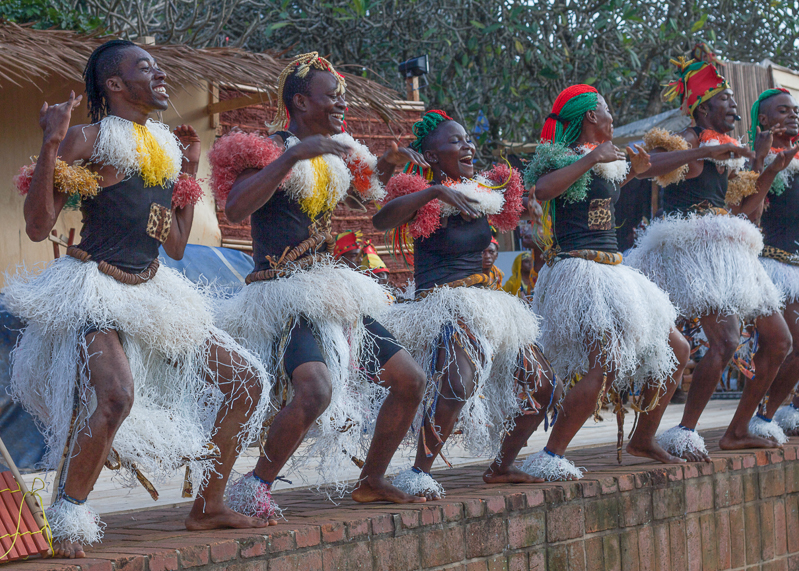

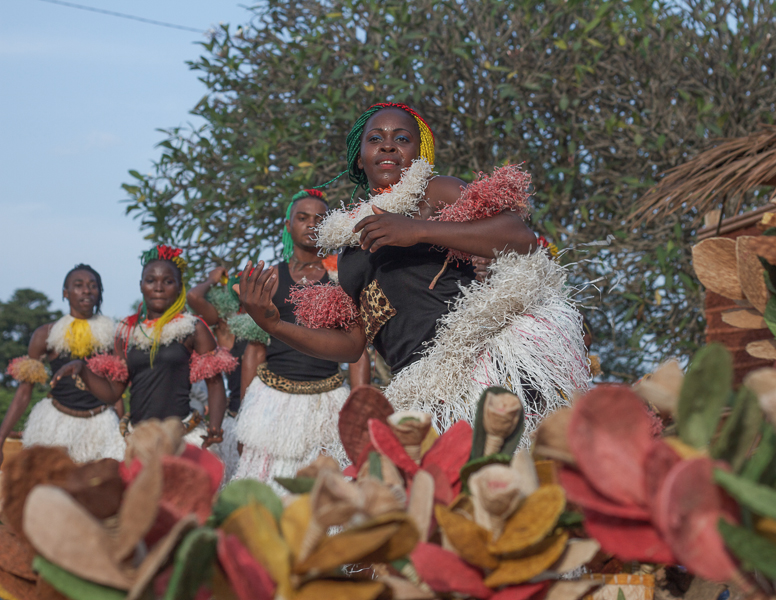

=== Traditional musical instruments ===
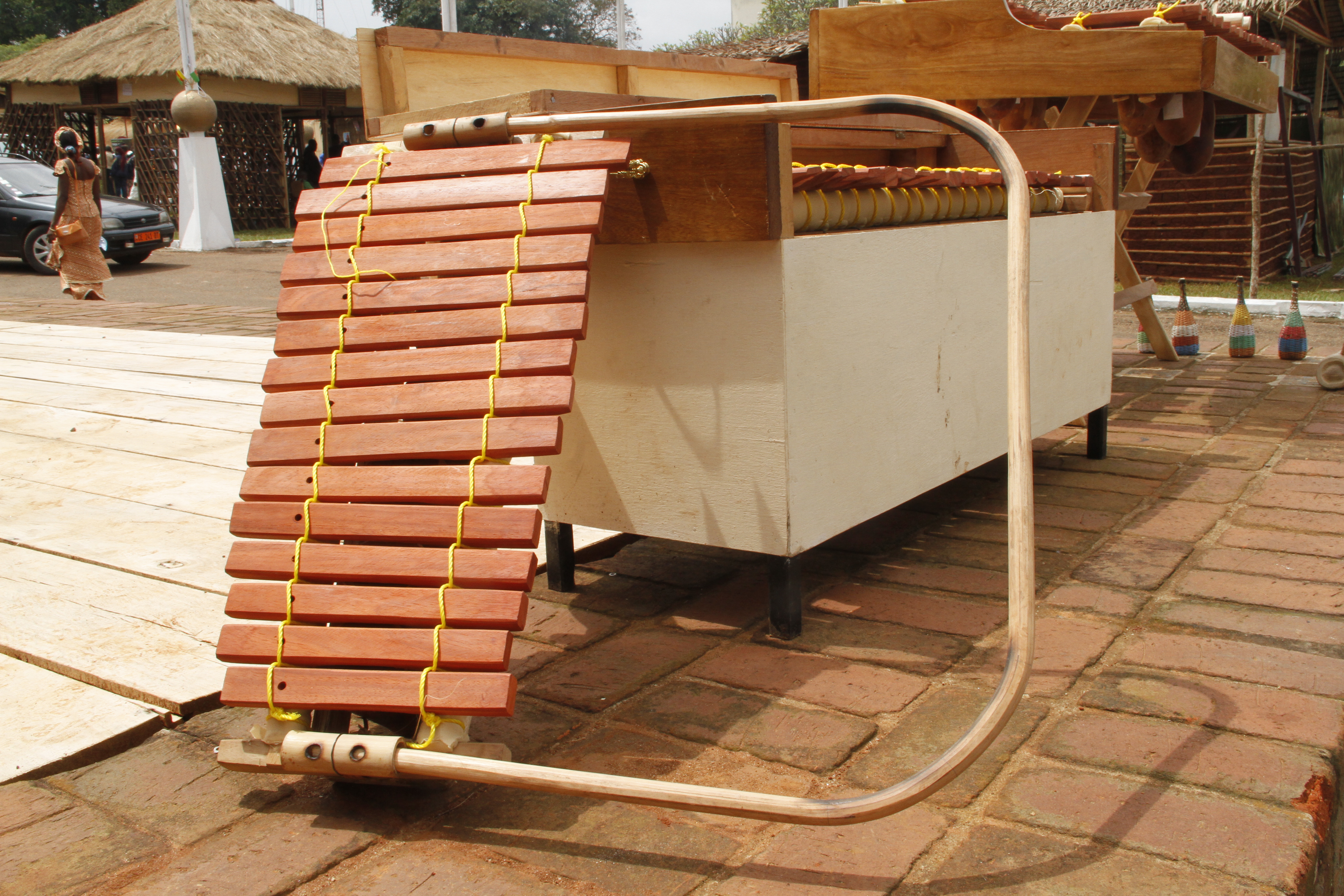

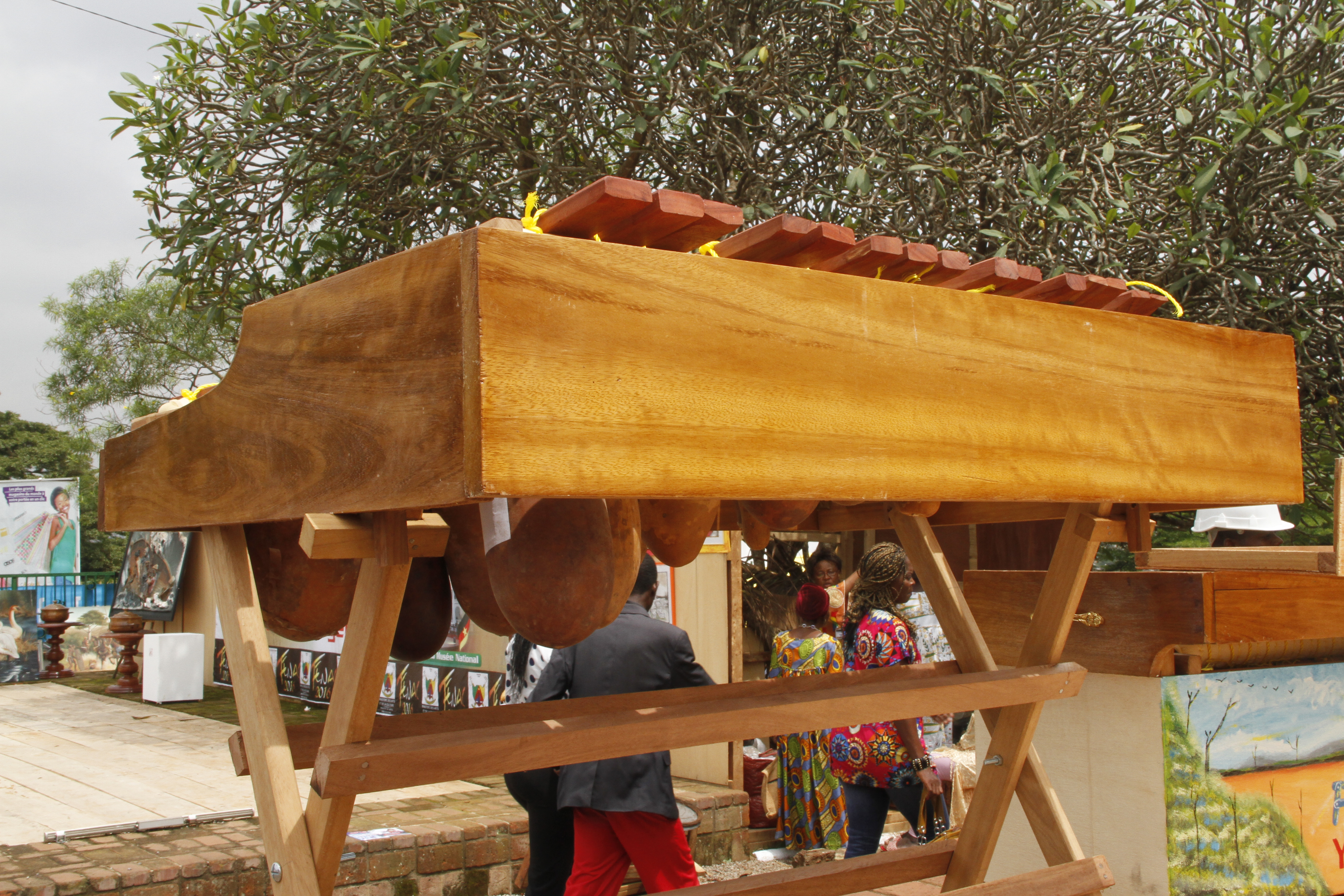

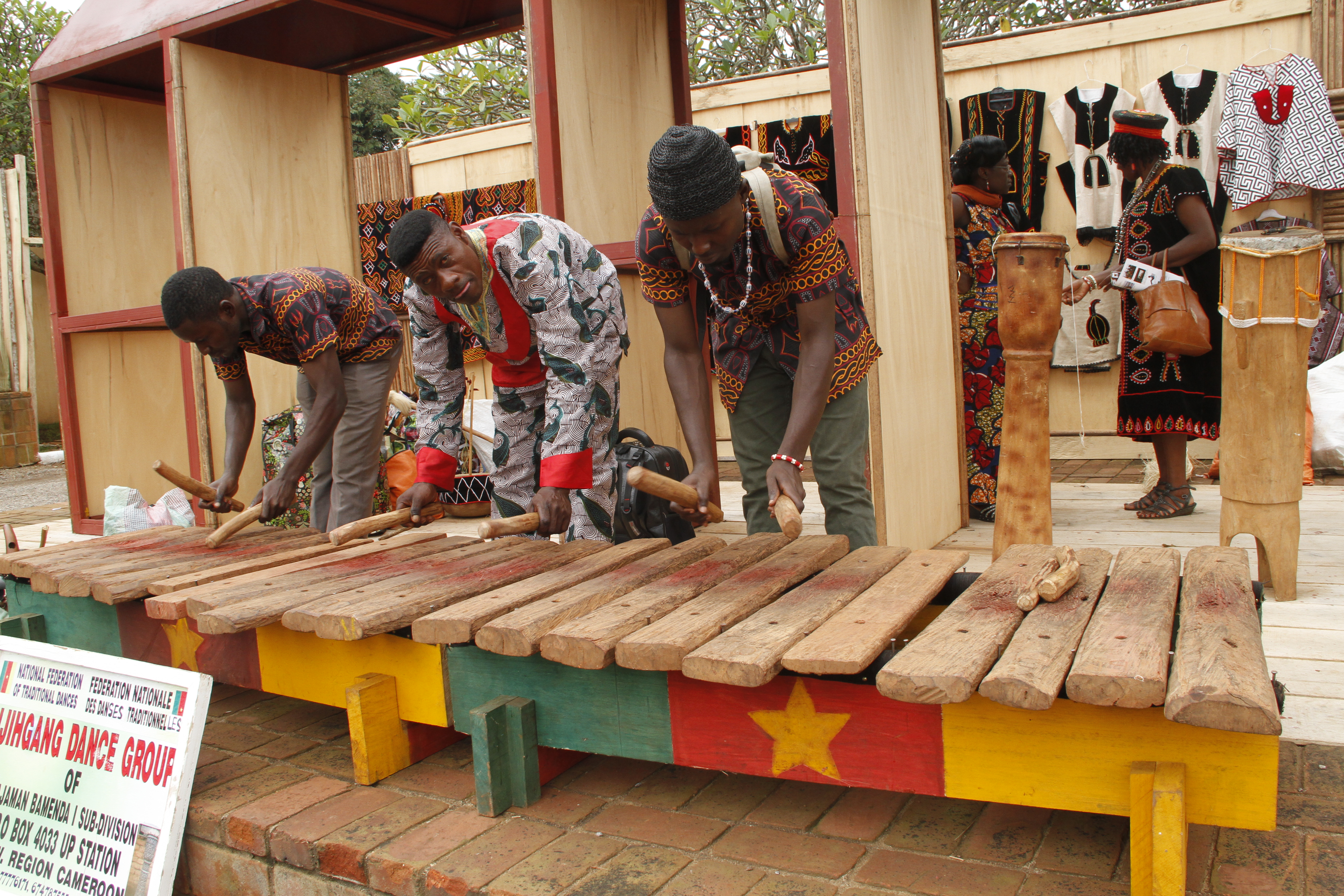

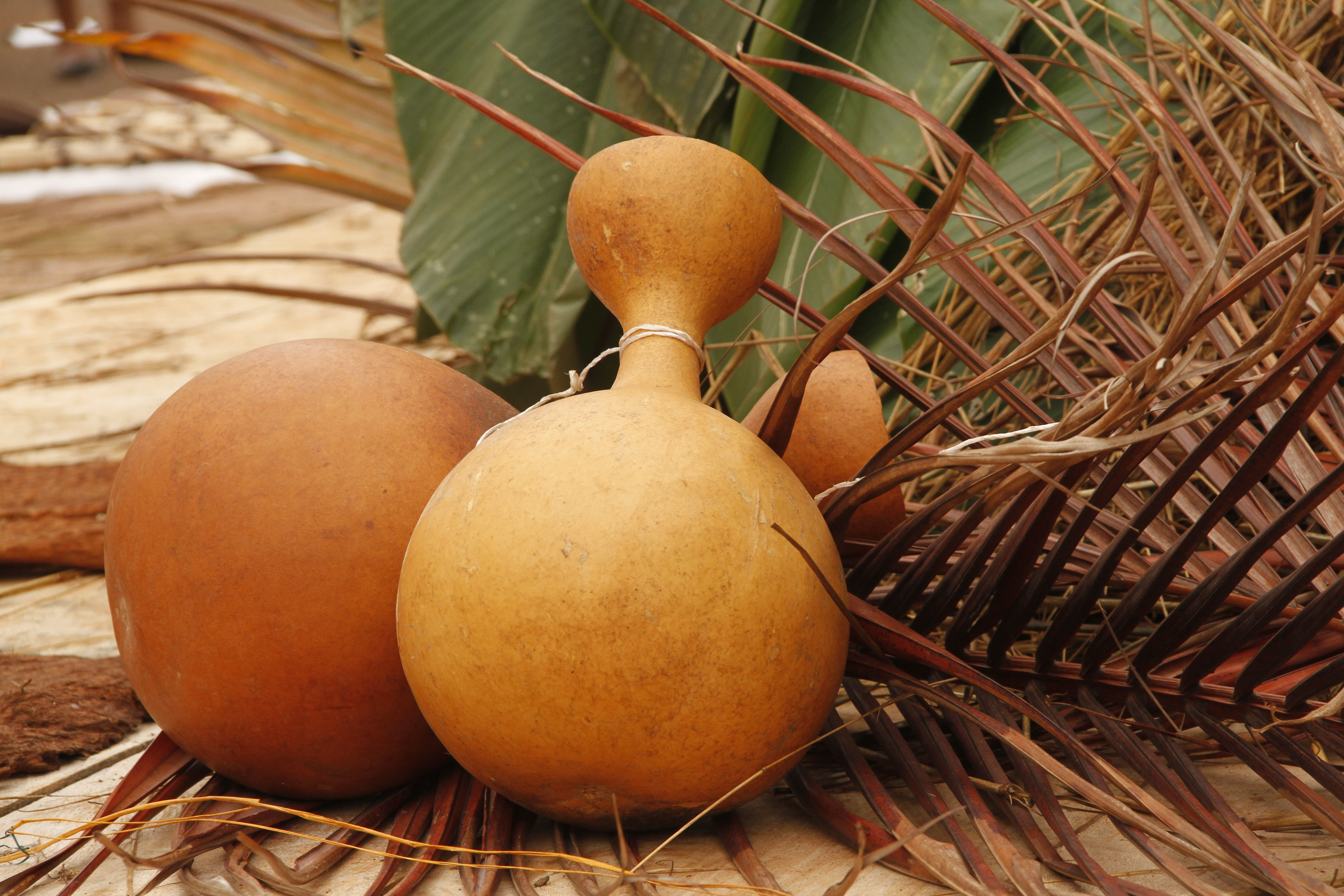

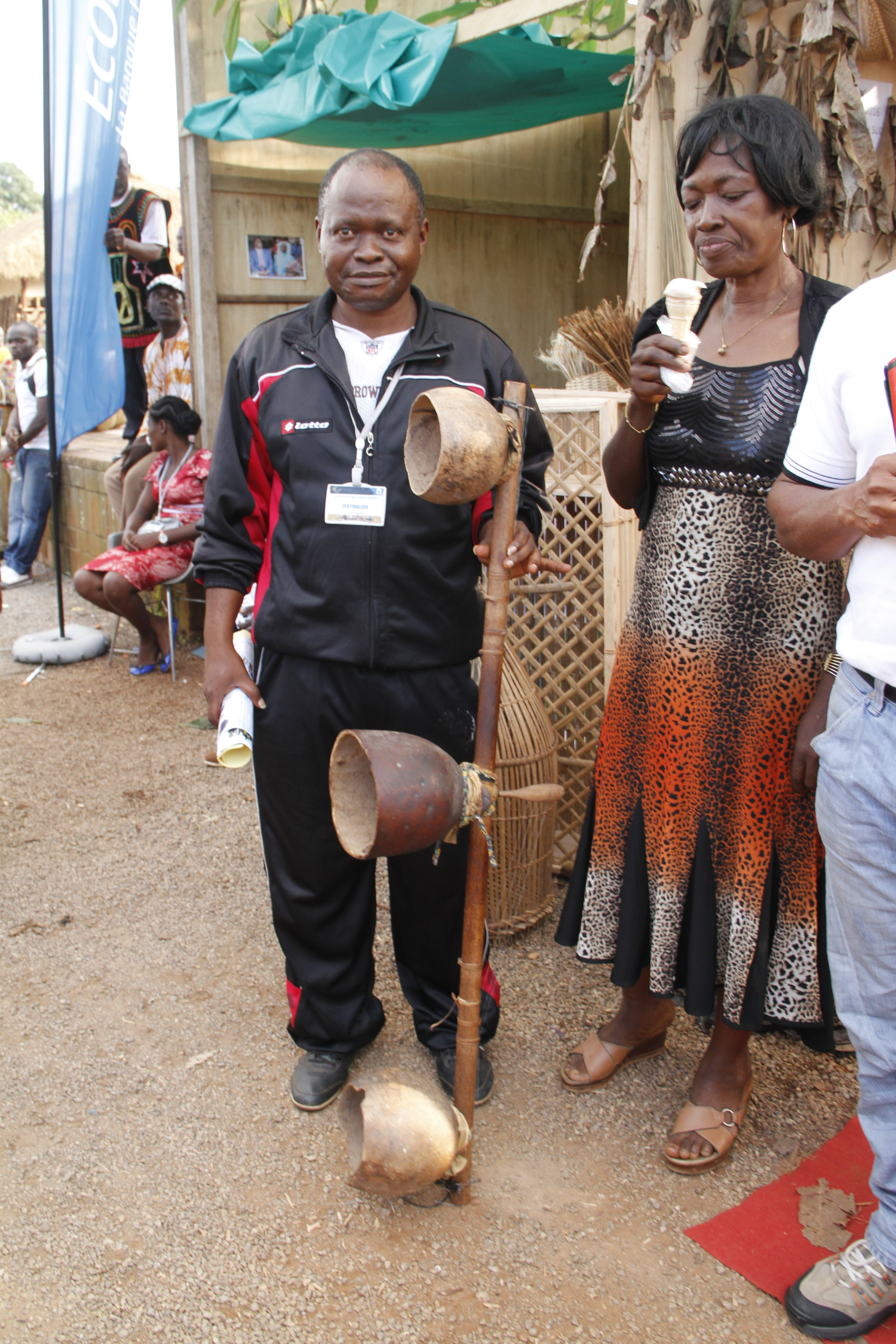
Mvêt

== Towns and settlements ==
- Oveng
