= Lynda Raymonde =

Cameroonian singer

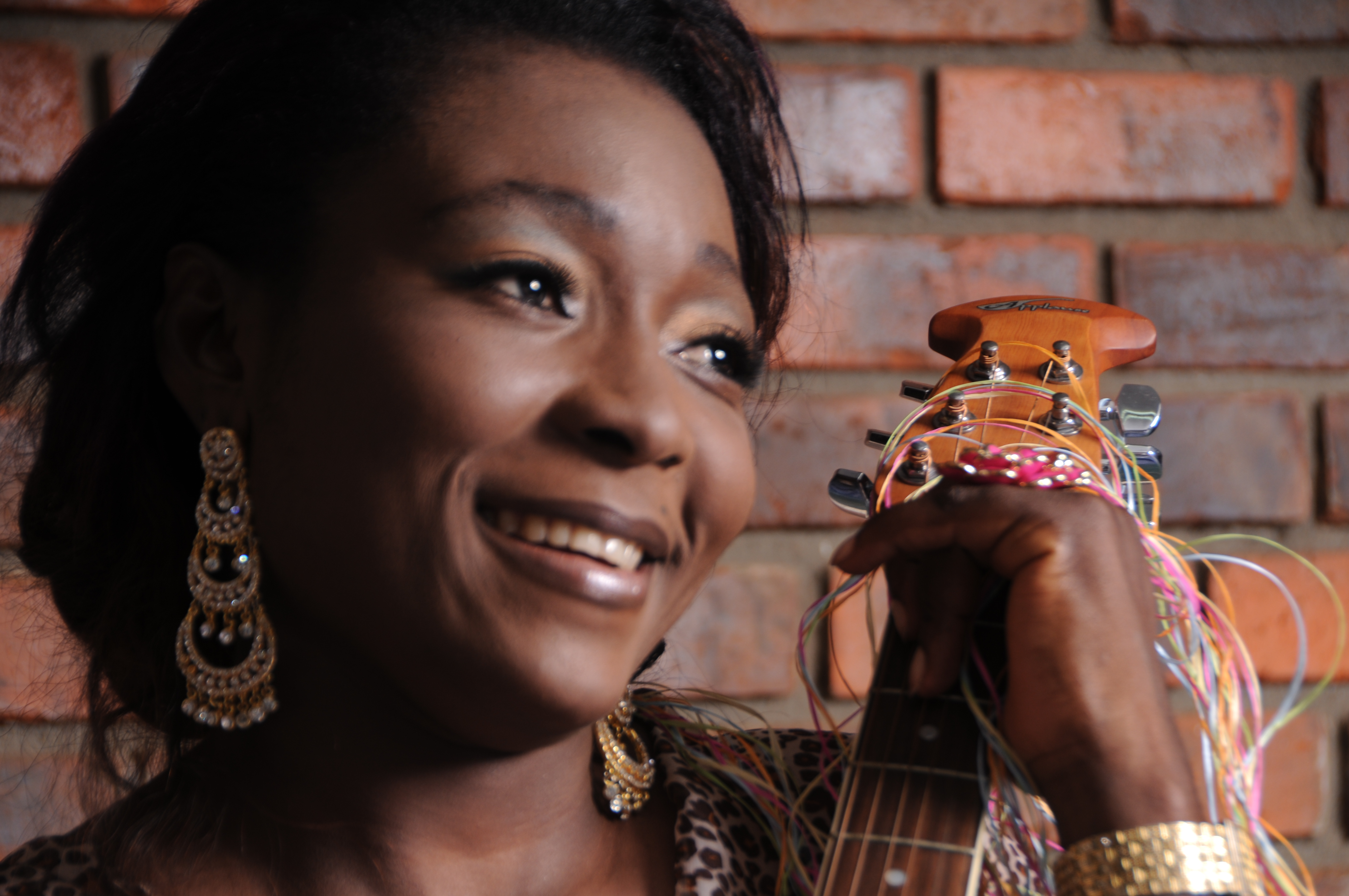
- Lynda Raymonde

Background information
- Born: Floriane Linda Nyebe Andella; May 10, 1981 (age 45); Yaoundé, Cameroon
- Origin: Lekié, Centre Region, Cameroon
- Genre: Bikutsi
- Occupation: Singer
- Works: Symbiose
- Years active: 2002–present

Lynda Raymonde (real name Floriane Linda Nyebe Andella), was born on May 10, 1981, in Yaoundé, and is a Cameroonian Bikutsi singer from Lekié in the Centre region of Cameroon. She began her professional career in 2003, but became known on the national and international music scene in 2011 with her debut album Symbiose.

== Biography ==
Lynda Raymonde was born on May 10, 1981, in Yaoundé from a father who was a civil engineer and a mother who was a French teacher. She is the eldest of six siblings.

=== Childhood ===
She studied at Lycée Bilingue de Bonabéri, Douala, and then at Mendong High School in Yaoundé where she obtained her Baccalauréat scientifique, série D. In 1998, while studying in Première D class, she joined rap group, Beri City Zoo (BCZ) of Lycée Bilingue de Bonabéri, where she became the lead singer. In high school, Lynda Raymonde also excelled in sports. She won the prize of the best in sports, she was also the national vice champion of karate, all categories, and later, vice-champion of Africa zone 4.

After obtaining her Baccalauréat, she enrolled at the University of Yaounde 1 to study Animal Biology. She joined the Yaounde 1 University choir. She began a professional career in music which she pursued in the cabarets of the city of Yaoundé.

A few years later, she enrolled at L’école supérieure des sciences et techniques de l’information et de la communication, Yaoundé where she obtained a Bachelor of Science in Information Technology and Communication in 2012, specializing in Advertising.

=== Career ===
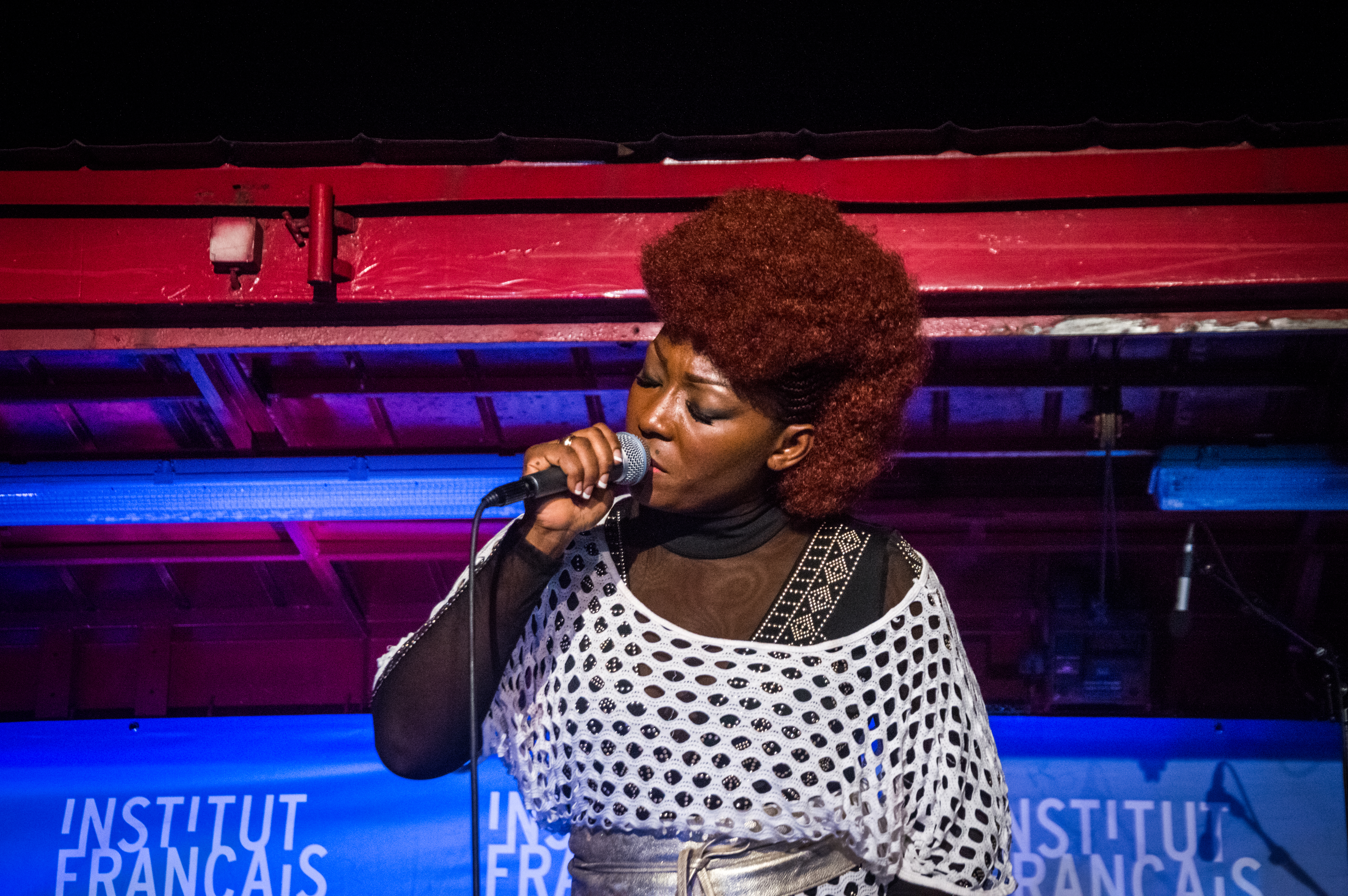
Lynda Raymonde during the 2017 Music Festival in front of l'Institut Français du Cameroun - Douala.

In 2002, Lynda Raymonde met bassist Remy Ottou who encouraged her to embark on a career without a solo. He taught her her first Bass notes and worked with her on his first compositions. She began her professional career in the cabarets of Yaoundé, notably at Bois d'Ebène where she sang from October 2002 to April 2005, then at Okoumé from April 2005 to September 2006.

She sang with several Cameroonian artists on stage among whom are; Anne Marie Nzié, Sergeo Polo, K Tino, Angel Ebogo, Marthe Zambo and Annie Anzouer and shared international scenes with other internationally renowned artists such as Wes Madiko, Gadji Celi, Chidinma, Zouk Machine, Bill Soum, Serge Benaud, X–Maleya and Charlotte Dipanda.

In April 2010, Lynda Raymonde released her first single entitled Cameroonian Reactions on the occasion of the celebration of the fiftieth anniversary of independence and the reunification of Cameroon. Her first album Symbiose was released in December 2011. The 8-track album was a great success, with more than 4,000 copies sold thanks to the title, Forme O - No Limit in Love, un hymn au marriage, from the album which earned her the 2012 Bikutsi Best Female Artist Award at Festi Bikutsi.

In 2015, she returned to the music scene with a Maxi single entitled Arrête comme ça. In December 2016, she released the single Infidèle, first extract of her next album announced in 2017.

=== Private life ===
After obtaining her diploma in advertising, Lynda Raymonde worked for several years as an advertiser in a large company in Yaoundé before creating L-Rayonn, a consulting firm in communication, marketing and events of which she is the head. She is married to a superior officer of the Cameroonian army and also a mother of several children

== Discography ==
=== Albums ===
- 2011 : Symbiose

=== Singles ===
- 2010 : Cameroonian Reactions
- 2015 : Arrête comme ça
- 2016 : Infidèle

== Awards ==
- 2012 : Meilleure artiste Bikutsi féminine de l’année au Festi Bikutsi
- 2012 : Révélation de l'année au Mvet D'or
- 2012 :Meilleur artiste espoir de la mode
- 2014: Prix de la reconnaissance artistique au Gold Azik Awards en France
