= Balafon =

Type of wooden xylophone originating in Mali

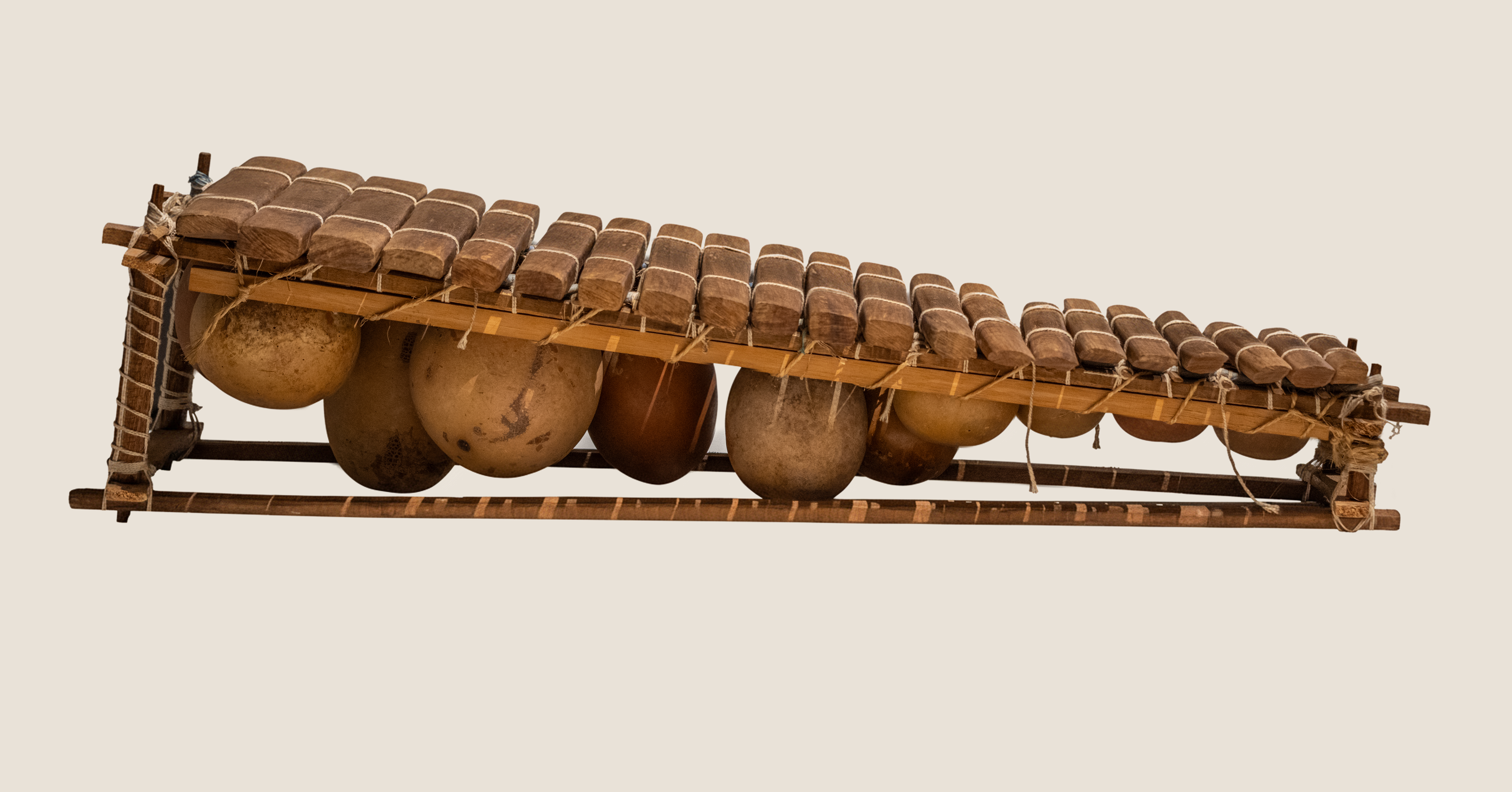
- A fixed-key balafon, showing resonators with membrane holes
- Other names: balafo, bala, balaphone, balaphon, balaphong, balani, gyil, balangi
- Classification: West African wooden Percussion idiophone with up to 21 keys
- Hornbostel–Sachs classification: 111.212 (Sets of percussion sticks)
- Developed: 12th century or earlier

Related instruments
- gyil, marimba, xylophone, gambang kayu

Cultural practices and expressions linked to Balafon and Kolintang in Mali, Burkina Faso, Côte d'Ivoire and Indonesia
- UNESCO Intangible Cultural Heritage
- Country: Mali, Burkina Faso, Ivory Coast, and Indonesia
- Reference: 02131
- Region: Asia and the Pacific, Africa

Inscription history
- Inscription: 2024 (19th session)
- List: Representative

The balafon (pronounced /ˈbæləfɒn/, or, by analogy with xylophone etc., /ˈbæləfoʊn/) is a gourd-resonated xylophone, a type of struck idiophone. It is closely associated with the neighbouring Mandé, Bwaba, Bobo, Senoufo and Gur peoples of West Africa, particularly the Guinean branch of the Mandinka ethnic group, but is now found across West Africa from Guinea, Burkina Faso, Mali. Its common name, balafon, is likely a European coinage combining its Mandinka name ߓߟߊ bála ([bala˦]) with the word ߝߐ߲ fóo (nyáa) ([foː˦ ɲaː˦]) 'to say / method of saying' or the Greek root phono.

== History ==
Believed to have been developed independently of the Southern African and South American instrument now called the marimba, oral histories of the balafon date it to at least the rise of the Mali Empire in the 12th century CE. Balafon is a Manding name, but variations exist across West Africa, including the balangi in Sierra Leone and the gyil of the Dagara, Lobi and Gurunsi from Ghana, Burkina Faso and Ivory Coast. Similar instruments are played in parts of Central Africa, with the ancient Kingdom of Kongo denoting the instrument as palaku.

Records of the balafon go back to at least the 12th century CE. In 1352 CE, Moroccan traveller Ibn Battuta reported the existence of the ngoni and balafon at the court of Malian ruler Mansa Suleyman.

European visitors to West Africa described balafons in the 17th century largely identical to the modern instrument. The Atlantic Slave Trade brought some balafon players to the Americas. The Virginia Gazette records African-Americans playing a barrafoo in 1776, which appears to be a balafon. Other North American references to these instruments die out by the mid-19th century.

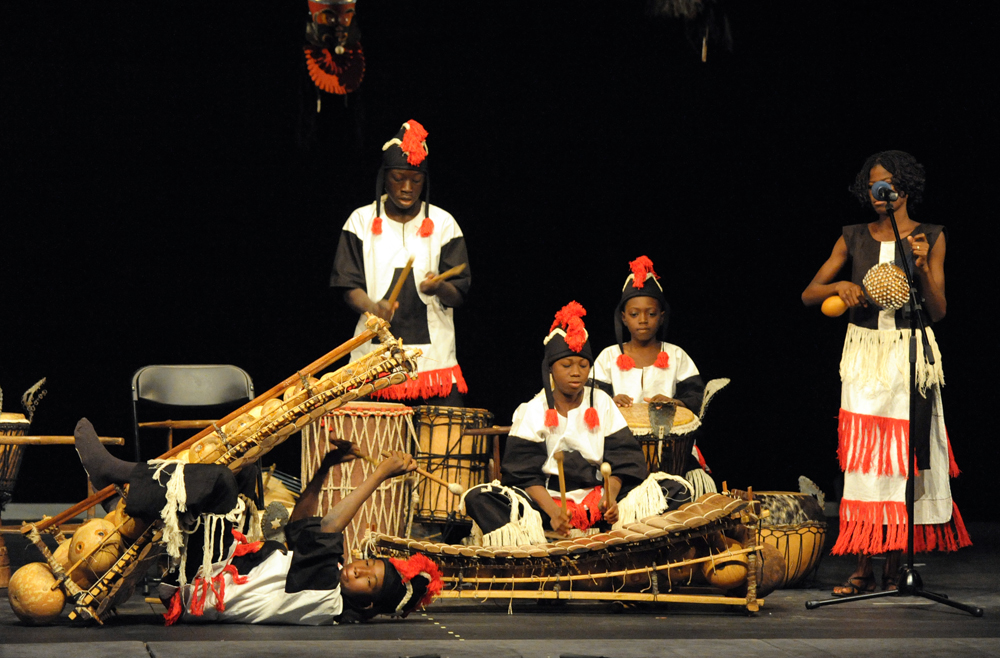
Children from Burkina Faso performing in Warsaw, Poland, during the 5th Cross Culture Festival, September 2009

The balafon has seen a resurgence since the 1980s in the growth of African Roots Music and World Music. Most famous of these exponents is the Rail Band, led by Salif Keita. Even when not still played, its distinctive sound and traditional style has been exported to western instruments. Maninka from eastern Guinea play a type of guitar music that adapts balafon playing style to the imported instrument.

=== Etymology ===
In the Malinké language balafon is a compound of two words: balan is the name of the instrument and fô is the verb to play. Balafon therefore is really the act of playing the bala.

Bala still is used as the name of a large bass balafon in the region of Kolokani and Bobo Dioulasso. These bala have especially long keys and huge calabashes for amplification. Balani is then used as the name of the high pitched, small balafon with small calabashes and short (3 to 4 cm long) keys. The balani is carried with a strap and usually has 21 keys, while the number of keys on a bala vary with region.

== Construction ==
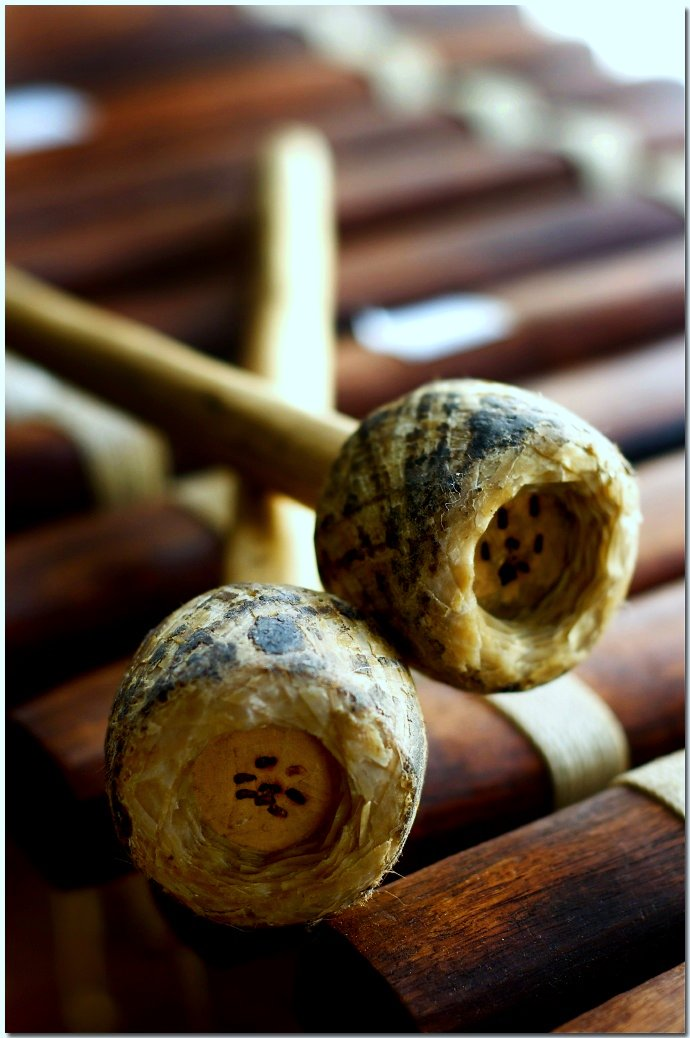
Gum-rubber mallets on a balafon

A balafon can be either fixed-key (where the keys are strung over a fixed frame, usually with calabash resonators underneath) or free-key (where the keys are placed independently on any padded surface). The balafon usually has 17–21 keys, tuned to a tetratonic, pentatonic or heptatonic scale, depending on the culture of the musician.

The balafon is generally capable of producing 18 to 21 notes, though some are built to produce many fewer notes (16, 12, 8 or even 6 and 7). Balafon keys are traditionally made from kosso rosewood, dried slowly over a low flame, and then tuned by shaving off bits of wood from the underside of the keys. Wood is taken off the middle to flatten the key or the end to sharpen it.

In a fixed-key balafon, the keys are suspended by leather straps just above a wooden frame, under which are hung graduated-size calabash gourd resonators. A small hole in each gourd is covered with a membrane traditionally of thin spider's-egg sac filaments (nowadays more usually of cigarette paper or thin plastic film) to produce the characteristic nasal-buzz timbre of the instrument, which is usually played with two gum-rubber-wound mallets while seated on a low stool (or while standing using a shoulder or waist sling hooked to its frame).

== Regional traditions ==
Balafon in Ivory Coast

As the balafon cultures vary across West Africa, so does the approach to the instrument itself. In many areas the balafon is played alone in a ritual context, in others as part of an ensemble. In Guinea and Mali, the balafon is often part of an ensemble of three, pitched low, medium and high. In Cameroon, six balafon of varying size perform together in an orchestra, called a komenchang. An Igbo variation exists with only one large tuned key for each player. And while in most cases a single player hits multiple keys with two mallets, some traditions place two or more players at each keyboard.

The Susu and Malinké people of Guinea are closely identified with the balafon, as are the other Manding peoples of Mali, Senegal, and the Gambia. Cameroon, Chad, and even the nations of the Congo Basin have long balafon traditions.

Often, balafon players will wear belled bracelets on each wrist, accentuating the sound of the keys.

In some cultures the balafon was (and in some still is) a sacred instrument, playable only by trained religious caste members and only at ritual events such as festivals, royal, funerial, or marriage celebrations. Here the balafon is kept in a temple storehouse, and can only be removed and played after undergoing purification rites. Specific instruments may be built to be only played for specific rituals and repertoires. Young adepts are trained not on the sacred instrument, but on free-key pit balafons.

The balafon music of the Sambla (Sembla) people in western Burkina Faso is notable for its complex speech surrogate system, where the words of the spoken Sambla language are translated into music in a similar fashion to the more famous case of talking drum communication.

=== Gyile ===
The gyile (English: /ˈdʒɪlə/ or /ˈdʒiːl/) is the name of a buzzing pentatonic balafon common to the Gur-speaking populations in northern Ghana, Burkina Faso, southeastern Mali and northern Ivory Coast in West Africa. Among Mande populations in Ghana like the Ligbi (Numu), Bissa and Dyula, the same instrument is known as bala. The gyil is the primary traditional instrument of the Dagara people of northern Ghana and Burkina Faso, and of the Lobi of Ghana, southern Burkina Faso, and Ivory Coast. The gyil is usually played in pairs, accompanied by a calabash gourd drum called a kuor. It can also be played by one person with the drum and the stick part as accompaniment, or by a soloist. Gyil duets are the traditional music of Dagara funerals. The instrument is generally played by men, who learn to play while young; however, there is no restriction on gender. It is also played by the Gurunsi people of the Upper East Region of Ghana, as well as neighbouring Gurunsi populations across the border in south and central Burkina Faso. A dance related to the gyil is the Bewaa.

The gyil's design is similar to the balaba or balafon used by the Mande-speaking Bambara, Dyula and Sosso peoples further west in southern Mali and western Burkina Faso, as well as the Senoufo people of Sikasso, a region that shares many musical traditions with those of northern Ivory Coast and Ghana. It is made with 14 wooden keys of an African hardwood called liga attached to a wooden frame, below which hang calabash gourds. Spider web silk covers small holes in the gourds to produce a buzzing sound and antelope sinew and leather are used for the fastenings. The instrument is played with rubber-headed wooden mallets.

=== Cameroon ===
During the 1950s, bars sprang up across Cameroon's capital to accommodate an influx of new inhabitants, and soon became a symbol for Cameroonian identity in the face of colonialism. Balafon orchestras, consisting of 3–5 balafons and various percussion instruments became common in these bars. Some of these orchestras, such as Richard Band de Zoetele, became quite popular in spite of scorn from the European elite.

The middle of the 20th century saw the popularisation of a native folk music called bikutsi. Bikutsi is based on a war rhythm played with various rattles, drums and balafon. Sung by women, bikutsi featured sexually explicit lyrics and songs about everyday problems. In a popularised form, bikutsi gained mainstream success in the 1950s. Anne-Marie Nzie was perhaps the most important of the early innovators. The next bikutsi performer of legendary stature was Messi Me Nkonda Martin and his band, Los Camaroes, who added electric guitars and other new elements.

Balafon orchestras had remained popular throughout the 50s in Yaoundé's bar scene, but the audience demanded modernity and the popular style at the time was unable to cope. Messi Martin was a Cameroonian guitarist who had been inspired to learn the instrument by listening to Spanish language-broadcasts from neighboring Equatorial Guinea, as well as Cuban and Zairean rumba. Messi changed the electric guitar by linking the strings together with pieces of paper, thus giving the instrument a damper tone that emitted a "thudding" sound similar to the balafon.

=== Guinea ===
The balafon, kora (lute-harp), and the ngoni (the ancestor of the banjo) are the three instruments most associated with griot bardic traditions of West Africa. Each is more closely associated with specific areas, communities, and traditions, though all are played together in ensembles throughout the region. Guinea has been the historic heartland of solo balafon. As griot culture is a hereditary caste, the Kouyaté family has been called the keepers of the balafon, and twentieth century members of this family have helped introduce it throughout the world.

==== The Sosso Bala ====
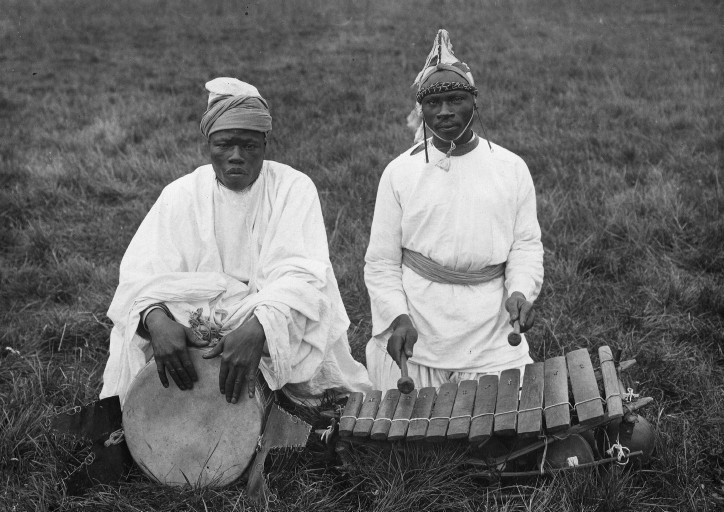
Djembe and balafon, Guinea

The Sosso Bala is a balafon, currently kept in the town of Niagassola, Guinea that is reputed to be the original balafon, constructed over 800 years ago. The Epic of Sundiata, a story of the formation of the Mali Empire, tells that a griot (praise-singer) named Bala Faséké Kouyaté convinced Sosso king Sumanguru Kante to employ him after sneaking into Sumanguru's palace and playing the sacred instrument. Sundiata Keita, founder of the Mali Empire overthrew Sumanguru, seized the balafon, and made the griot Faséké its guardian. This honor is said to have passed down through his family, the Kouyatés, and conveys upon them mastership of the balafon to this day.

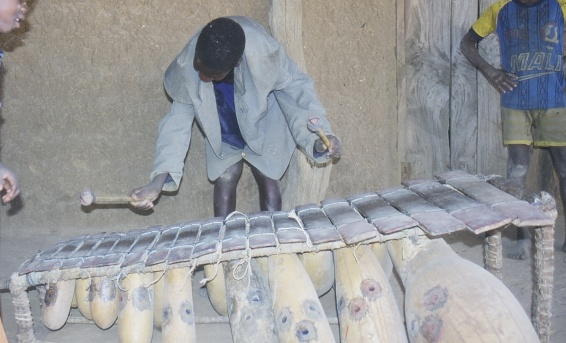
A young balafon player, Mali

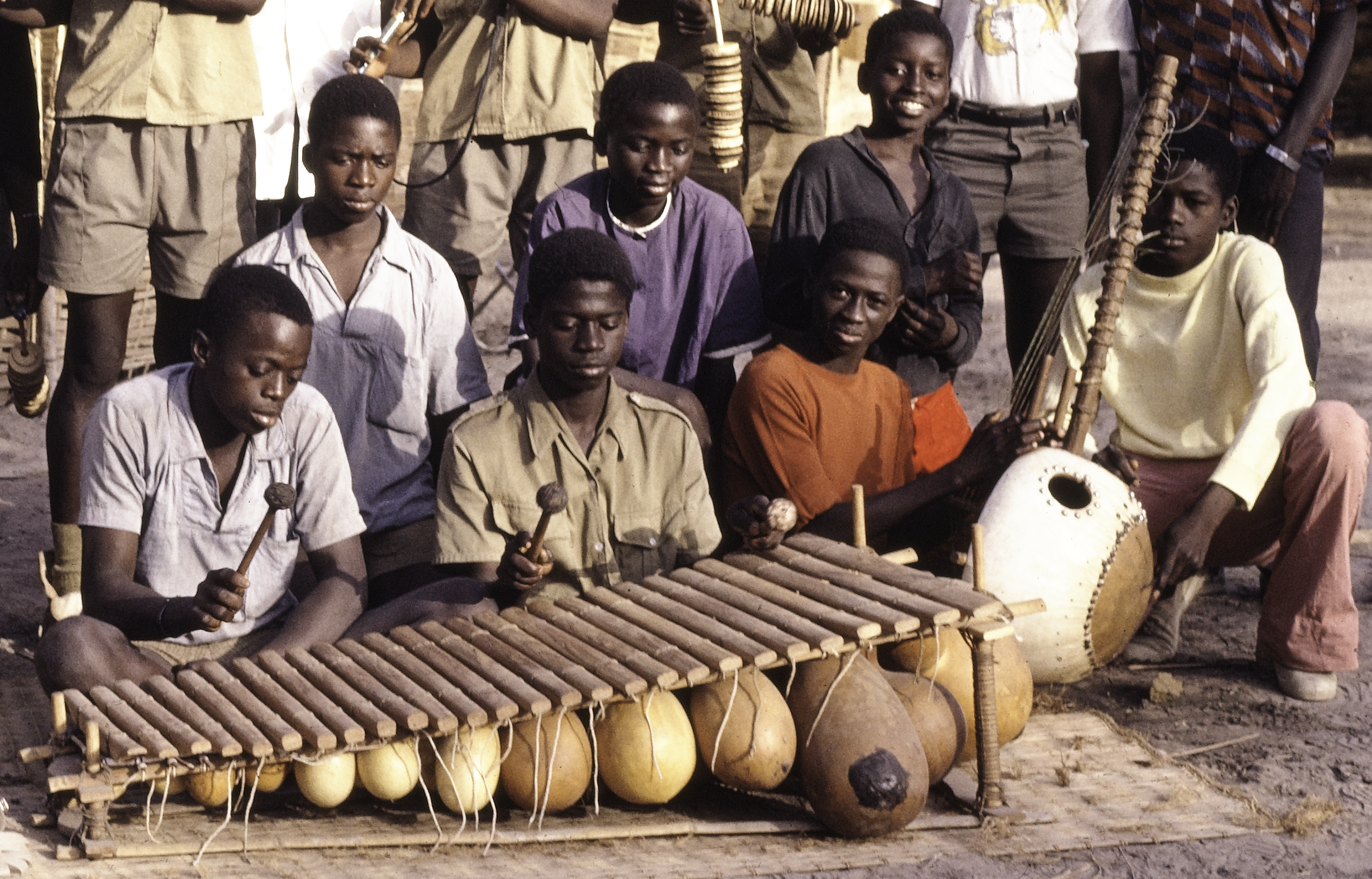
Balafon players in a PAIGC schoolband, Ziguinchor, Senegal, 1973

Historians Jan Jansen and Francis Simonis have argued that the Sosso Bala was in fact 'invented' as a historical artifact by the Kouyaté family in the 1970s. Regardless of the truth of this story, the Sosso Bala was named by UNESCO as one of the Nineteen Masterpieces of the Oral and Intangible Heritage of Humanity in 2001.

=== Senegal ===
The title of the Senegalese National Anthem is "Pincez tous vos koras, frappez les balafons" (Everyone strum your koras, strike the balafons).

=== Mali ===
A modern festival devoted to the balafon, the Triangle du balafon, now takes place annually at Sikasso in Mali.

== Famous players and ensembles ==
Famous balafon players have included:

- Madou Kone, Balafon Master from Burkina Faso, living in Vienna, Austria
- Richard Bona, Cameroonian jazz musician
- Abdou Karim Diabate "Tunkaraba" King of Balafon, from the village of Tabatto, Guinea-Bissau
- Djiby Diabaté
- Kélétigui Diabaté, playing for Habib Koité's Bamada group
- Mamadou Diabate, Knight of the National Order of Burkina Faso (2016), Winner of the "Grand Prix" & "Prix de la Virtuosite de Festival Triangle du Balafon" in Mali (2012), Winner of the Austrian World Music Award (2011)
- Lassana Diabaté, Malian musician known for work with Toumani Diabaté's Symmetric Orchestra and Afrocubism
- Modibo Diabaté, from Mali
- Zerika Djabate, Bissau-Guinean musician
- Djiguiya, percussion band from Burkina Faso
- Danny Elfman of Oingo Boingo
- Les Freres Coulibaly, Burkina-based balafon ensemble
- Stefon Harris, American jazz musician
- Mickey Hart, American percussionist
- Dominic Howard of Muse used a balafon on the band's second album, Origin of Symmetry
- Mory Kanté, early in his career
- Aly Keita, Aly Keita and the Magic Balaphone, Malian balafon player
- Gert Kilian, DVD "The Balafon with Aly Keita & Gert Kilian", "Balafon Beat" / Verlag Zimmermann
- Lawrence Killian, American jazz musician
- Mahama Konaté of John Cena, Burkina-based balafon ensemble
- Balla Kouyate, from Mali/Guinea, whose father, Sekou "Filani" Kouyaté, is the current guardian of the Sosso Bala
- Mamadi Kouyate, from Mali/Guinea, (Germany since 2015), whose grandfather Sékou "Filani" Kouyaté, is the current guardian of the Sosso Bala
- El Hadj Djeli Sory Kouyaté
- N'Faly Kouyate of the Afro Celt Sound System
- Adam Malik, Burkina-based balafon ensemble
- Dave Mann, jazz percussionist, played with the Dave Brubeck Group
- Neba Solo (Senufo balafon group, led by Souleymane Traoré) from Sikasso
- Mama Ohandja, Cameroonian composer and performer to his country
- Qasim, Burkina-based balafon ensemble
- Pharoah Sanders, American jazz musician
- Saramaya, Burkina-based balafon ensemble
- Raheel Sharif, British band leader originally from Senegal
- Bill Summers, American jazz musician, performing with Quincy Jones, Herbie Hancock, and Los Hombres Calientes
- Lonnie Liston Smith, American jazz musician
- Rokia Traoré, Malian singer, guitarist, and band leader
- Le Troupe Saaba, Burkina-based balafon ensemble
- Momo Werner Wevers, German balafon player, plays solo and with the "Ensemble M.Pahiya" (balafon and classical guitar)
- N'Camara Abou Sylla (Guinea; Les Ballets Africains)
- Benno Sterzer, German balafon player living in Austria, duet partner of Madou Kone, released "Balafon -Songs from Africa"

== See also ==
- Balafon was the name of the in-flight magazine of Air Afrique
- Music of Guinea
- Music of Mali
- Marimba, covers the modern instrument which developed independently in both South America and southern Africa.
- Kolintang, similar musical instrument from North Sulawesi, Indonesia
- Ranat, similar musical instrument from Thailand

== Sources ==
- "BALAFON BEAT" by Gert Kilian, edition Zimmermann / Germany http://www.gert-kilian.com/bb/index.html
- "The Balafon with Aly Keita & Gert Kilian", edition "improductions" / Paris http://www.gert-kilian.com/DVDbalafon.html
- "Das magische Balafon" by Mamadi Kouyaté, Ursula Branscheid-Kouyaté, https://www.djembe-kora.de/mamadi.html
- Gibb, H. A. R.; Beckingham, C .F., eds. (1994), The Travels of Ibn Baṭṭūṭa, A.D. 1325–1354 (Volume 4), London: Hakluyt Society, ISBN 978-0-904180-37-4
- Jobson, Richard (1968) [1623], The golden trade or A discovery of the river Gambra, and the golden trade of the Aethiopians, London: Dawsons of Pall Mall
