= Batanga Tragedy Memorial =

Monument commemorating the Batanga tragedy in Cameroon

- Mémorial de la Tragédie des Batanga
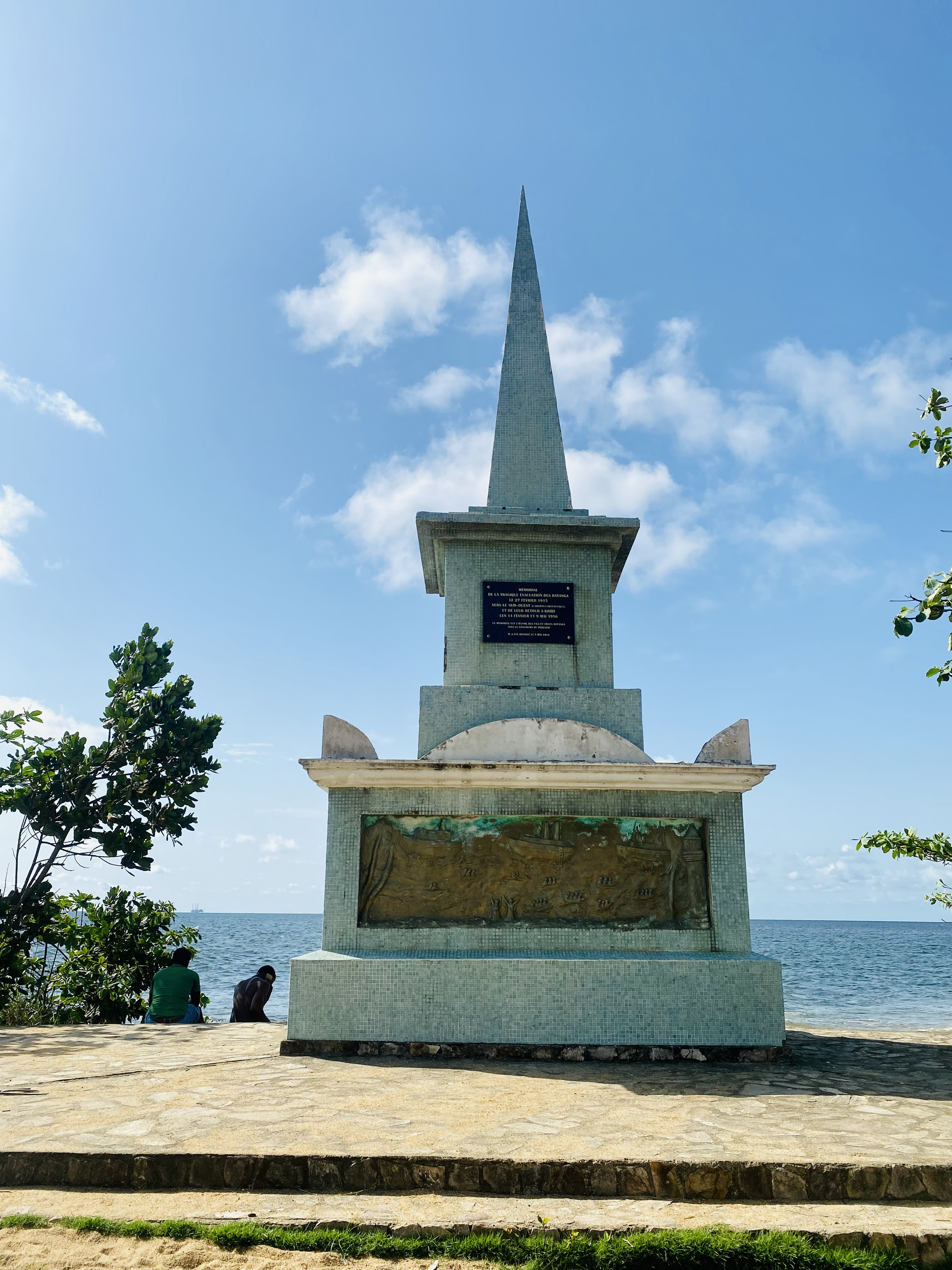
- The Batanga Tragedy Memorial in Kribi
- Interactive map of Batanga Tragedy Memorial
- Location: Kribi, South Region, Cameroon
- Coordinates: 2°56′N 9°55′E
- Type: Memorial monument
- Material: Concrete
- Inauguration date: February 2017
- Dedicated to: Batanga people

Batanga Tragedy Memorial is a monument situated in Kribi, southern Cameroon, symbolising the painful legacy of colonisation. It commemorates two tragic events that occurred in 1880 and later between 1914 and 1916. The Batanga people were nearly decimated.

== Historical Background ==
=== The Daya War (1880) ===
Before the official German annexation of Cameroon, British traders were highly active along the coast of Kribi. In 1880, after a disagreement in which the Batanga people captured a British sailor named Govier, the British Royal Navy launched a retaliatory military campaign known locally as the Daya War. During the conflict, British warships attacked coastal communities in Batanga, causing many civilian deaths and destroying numerous fishing villages by fire.

=== World War I and Deportation (1914–1916) ===
Following the establishment of German rule in German Kamerun, colonial authorities repeatedly displaced the Batanga people from their ancestral lands to support colonial expansion and forced labour programs.

At the outbreak of World War I in August 1914, Anglo-French Allied naval forces launched attacks on the strategic port city of Kribi. Concerned that the Batanga population might support the British forces, German military officials arrested and executed the traditional Batanga ruler, Madola ma Dimale, on August 8, 1914, together with other leaders accused of resisting colonial authority.

While retreating inland, German troops forcibly removed many local inhabitants from their communities. Allied naval vessels later evacuated thousands of Batanga refugees to British-administered territories in western Cameroon to protect them from the ongoing conflict.

During this period of displacement, the Batanga people endured extremely difficult living conditions, including hunger, disease, and poor sanitation, which caused many deaths and severe population decline. The survivors eventually returned by sea to Kribi on May 9, 1916. This historic return continues to be remembered annually by the local population through the traditional Mayi festival.

== Geography ==
The Batanga Tragedy Memorial is situated on a notable coastal cliff in the resort town of Kribi, one of the principal cities in South Region of Cameroon. The monument is specifically located on the left side of the Kienké River, approximately 15 meters from the historic Kribi Lighthouse which was constructed in 1906 during the period of German colonial rule.

Officially inaugurated in February 2017, the memorial takes the form of a square concrete structure crowned with a green pyramid. The green pyramid was intentionally designed to blend with the lush coastal forest environment of Kribi. The outer walls of the monument are decorated with elaborate bas-reliefs and a commemorative historical stele portraying the suffering endured by the indigenous people, particularly the destruction of fishing settlements during the Daya War of 1880 and the deaths of civilians who were used as human shields during World War I.

The site also serves as the main location for commemorations during the Mayi Festival, also referred to as the Ninth of May, an ancestral celebration organised by the Batanga people to honor their endurance, cultural identity, and survival. Each year, especially on May 9th, the area surrounding the monument and the nearby coastline becomes the centre of traditional dances, cultural parades, and colourful maritime pirogue processions. The festivities conclude with a symbolic communal bath at the beach, regarded as a sacred purification ceremony in the Atlantic Ocean, commemorating the day in 1916 when their ancestors were finally returned safely to their homeland.

== Commemoration and the Centenary ==
The milestone dates of February 14 and May 9, 2016, officially marked the centenary of the return from forced exile of the indigenous Batanga people, a defining moment of historical reclamation in coastal Cameroon. To officially inaugurate the nationwide remembrance activities, a high-profile press conference was delivered by the Paramount Chief of the Batanga Lohovè Traditional Grouping, who served as the executive president of the organizing committee for the Mayi Centenary, which is known locally as the Festival of Return. This public event brought critical attention to the human casualties of the First World War in coastal Cameroon, connecting the initial 1915 displacement of the community to their forced march up to the highlands of Buea.

The centenary celebrations culminated in May 2016, drawing over 200,000 global visitors to Kribi's shores for an extensive sequence of pontifical masses, customary reconciliatory ceremonies, and traditional musical symphonies spearheaded by regional cultural icons. Supported by Cameroon's Ministry of Arts and Culture, the festival firmly established the monument's role in preserving regional identity, showcasing how the ancestral beach rituals and collective ocean immersions symbolise a communal rebirth and structural healing from the traumas of colonial-era displacement.

== Related Articles ==
- Kribi Lighthouse
- Martin-Paul Samba
- South Region (Cameroon)
- Kamerun
- Duala people
