= Lolodorf =

- Commune and town
- Location in Cameroon
- Coordinates: 3°14′N 10°44′E
- Country: Cameroon
- Region: South Region
- Division: Ocean Department
- Time zone: UTC+1 (WAT)

Lolodorf is a small town-centred region in the south province of the Republic of Cameroon, near the western coast of Africa. It is between Ngoumou and Bipindi, in a zone of the Atlantic Littoral Evergreen Forest.

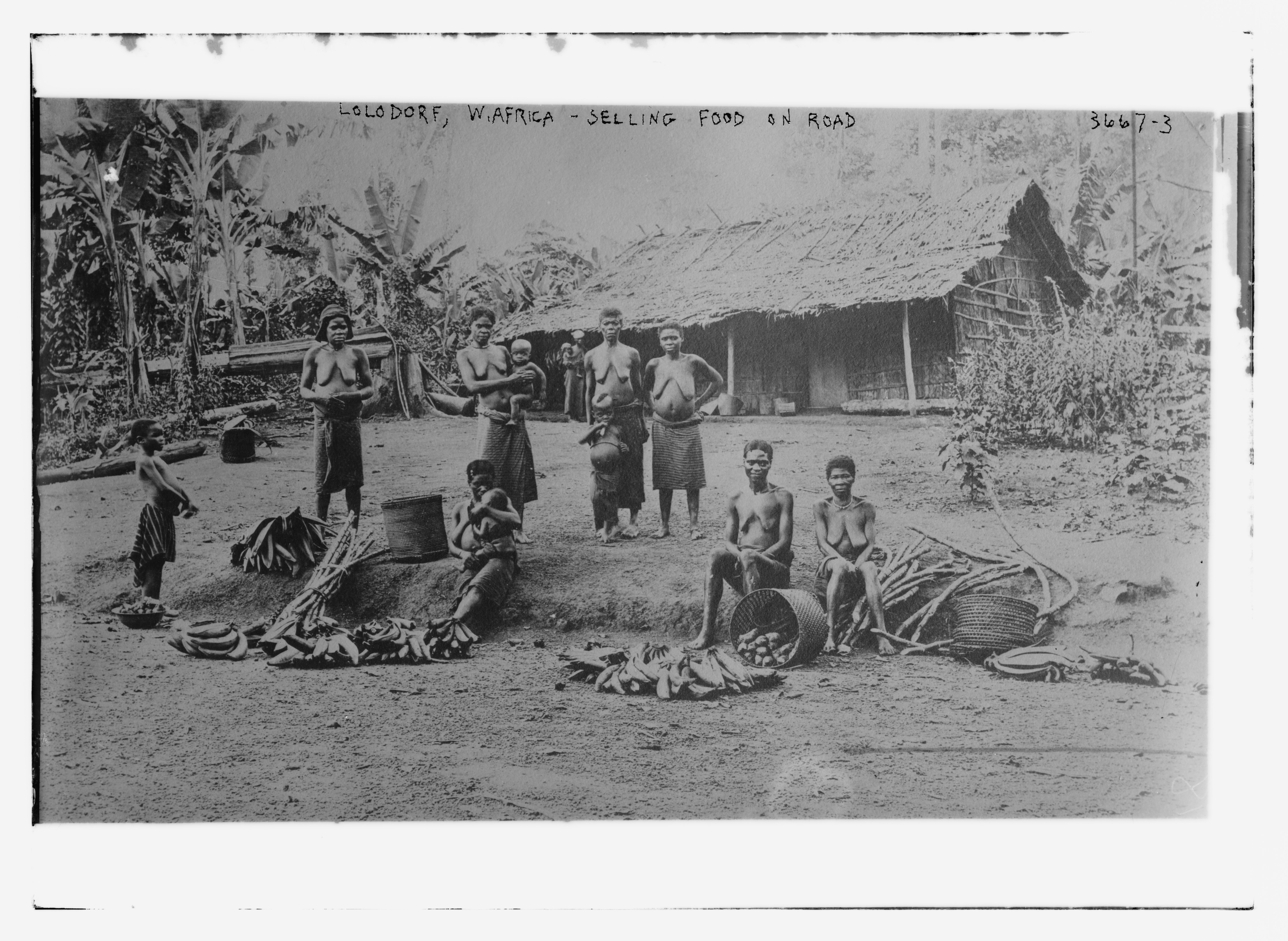
Lolodorf, W. Africa -- selling food on road in 1900

It is notable for being the home of Pygmy clans and their camp settlements and hunting areas, such as those of the Lala and Bakola clans. The Ngumba and Kwassio (speakers of Makaa–Njem languages) and Bagyeli tribes also reside in the area, the Bagyeli having been forced off their lands by the logging industry since the 1960s and the effect of the new oil pipeline since 1999. There are also settled Bantu peoples, who previously 'owned' pygmy clans.

The name of Lolodorf is German in origin, and relates to the name of a notable of Bikoui village, Loule-Dorf. In 1897 a Christian mission was opened in Lolodorf. Most of the people in the region are now Christians.

The Lokoundje River flows through Lolodorf, said to be "narrow with fast moving water and numerous waterfalls", and there is a temporary bridge over the river. Malaria and sleeping sickness are common problems in the humid climate, and there are a variety of natural remedies in which the Pygmy healers are expert.

The nearest market is at the coastal port & resort town of Kribi, and there is a dirt road to it from Lolodorf of about 110 km. The trip usually takes around 6 hours.

The main occupations are farming, tapping palm wine, gathering fruits and nuts for food, and hunting. There are some cocoa plantations. Coffee was grown here historically, but was abandoned as a crop in the mid-1990s. There is said to be little river fishing. There is some limited tourism, arriving from Kribi; people come to see Pygmy camps, wildlife, and local musicians.

Eight different languages are spoken in the town. There is a volunteer-run French radio station at Lolodorf that began broadcasting in 1997.

There has been a weather station in the town for more than 25 years.

Nearby villages are Saballi and Jalalli. There is a seminary at nearby Bibia which trains Presbyterian ministers.

Oil companies aim to run an important pipeline through the area, taking oil from Doba in Chad to an undersea terminal on the sea coast at Kribi. There is a $600,000 'Indigenous Peoples Plan' as compensation to local people, following an intensive study of the area's economy in 1999. Organisations such as Forest Peoples have concerns about the management and distribution of such aid.

There is thought to be some illegal mining of diamonds and gold in the area.

== Notable people ==
- Anne-Marie Nzié, renowned Cameroonian Bikutsi singer
