= Kouyaté =

Kouyaté is a surname common in Senegal, Guinea, Mali, and the Ivory Coast. Notable people with the surname include:

- Adama Kouyaté, Malian photographer
- Bassekou Kouyate, Malian musician
- Boubakar Kouyaté, Malian footballer
- Cheikhou Kouyaté, Senegalese footballer
- Kandia Kouyaté, Malian jelimuso (a female griot) and kora player
- Lansana Kouyaté, Prime Minister of Guinea from 2007 to 2008
- Mamadou Kouyaté, Malian footballer
- Moussa Kouyate, Malian kora player
- Moustapha Kouyaté, Guinean footballer
- Soriba Kouyaté, Senegalese kora player
- Sotigui Kouyaté, Malian-Burkinabé actor and footballer
