= Neba Solo =

West African musician

Neba Solo (born 1969) is the stage name of Souleymane Traoré, a musician based in Mali, West Africa. Neba Solo plays a kind of balafon, a marimba with wooden keys mounted on a wooden frame and attached to resonating chambers made from dried gourds.

Traoré hails from the village of Nebadougou, in the eastern part of the Sikasso region of Mali. His stage name derives from his home town, plus the shortened form of his first name (Souleymane).

He learned to play the balafon from his father, who was also an accomplished musician. He also learned how to make balafons from his father with local materials. He soon began performing with other musicians and formed a group, with himself playing balafon and singing, his younger brother Siaka also playing balafon, and various others from Nebadougou on accompanying percussion instruments. After listening to reggae music as a teenager, Traoré decided to experiment with his balafon's design, adding three extra bass keys to the instrument. In his group's current form, Souleymane plays his specially adapted bass balafon while Siaka plays the upper-register "lead" form of the instrument.

Neba Solo's music began to receive airplay on radio stations throughout his home region of Sikasso from the mid-1990s, particularly after the release of his recording "Hommage à Lamissa Bengaly." In 1996 he released another recording on the Malian market, entitled "Kenedougou Foly," which included highly successful songs such as "Vaccination," "Deli Fara," "Noumou Foly," and "Kenedougou Foly." The songs combined the best of the balafon's danceable rhythms with key innovations including vocal accompaniment and a driving bass line. Lyrics were sung in Traoré's native Senoufo language as well as in Bambara, Mali's most widely spoken language.

By 2002 Neba Solo's success had spread across Mali, and his group appeared regularly on nationally televised music shows. They composed and performed a popular anthem "CAN 2002" for the 2002 African Cup of Nations soccer tournament which Mali hosted. In the summer of 2003, they were part of Mali's delegation to the Smithsonian Folklife Festival, one of a small number of musical artists to be so honored.

Neba Solo has collaborated with artists from Mali as well as around the world, including French electronic musical artist Frédéric Galliano and the Iranian percussion group Trio Chemirani. Some of his songs have also been remixed by DJs and released on compilations by Six Degrees Records. Neba Solo has toured in Europe and North America in addition to Africa.
