= List of lighthouses in Cameroon =

This is a list of lighthouses in Cameroon.

== Lighthouses ==
Name	Image	Year built	Location & coordinates	Class of light	Focal height	NGA number	Admiralty number	Range nml
Cap Debundscha Lighthouse		1904	4°05′56.1″N 8°58′39.5″E	Fl WR 5s.	41 metres (135 ft)	25084	D3990	16
Cap Nachtigal Lighthouse		1904	3°57′06.8″N 9°12′42.1″E	Iso W 2s.	44 metres (144 ft)	25100	D4000	14
Kribi Lighthouse (Range Front)		1906	2°56′22.3″N 9°54′14.3″E	Fl (3) W 12s.	18 metres (59 ft)	25236	D4134	14
Kribi Range Rear Lighthouse		1906	2°56′15.3″N 9°54′29.1″E	F G	30 metres (98 ft)	25240	D4134.1	8

== See also ==
- List of lighthouses in Nigeria (to the west)
- List of lighthouses in Equatorial Guinea (to the south)
- Lists of lighthouses and lightvessels
