= Lady Ponce =

Cameroonian singer

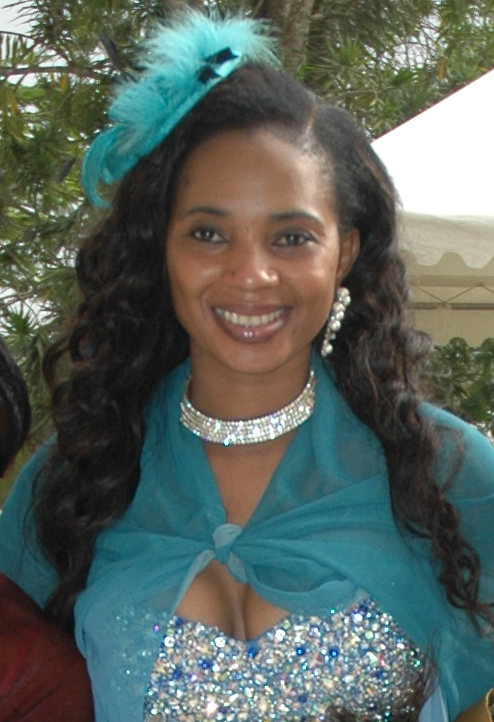
- Lady Ponce in 2012

Background information
- Also known as: La Reine de Bikutsi
- Born: Adèle Ruffine Ngono; Mbalmayo, Cameroon
- Origin: Yaoundé, Cameroon
- Genres: Bikutsi
- Knight of Order of Valour

Adèle Ruffine Ngono, known by her stage name Lady Ponce, is a Cameroonian singer and songwriter. She is also known as "La Reine de Bikutsi" (the Queen of Bikutsi). In 2014, Ngono was named a knight of the Order of Valour.

== Early life ==
Ngono was born in Mbalmayo, Cameroon. Following the death of her mother in 1999, she moved to Yaoundé, where she joined Chapelle d’Essos, the local choir. Ngono performed in cabarets at Camp Sonel and La Cascade.

== Career ==
In 2007, Ngono released her first album, Le ventre et le bas-ventre, which consisted of six songs. The album led to her winning the Canal 2'Or's Best Voice and Musical Revelation awards for that year. Ngono followed up the success of her first album with three albums produced by Jean Pierre Saah: Confession in 2009, La loi du talion in 2011, and Bombe atomique in 2012, containing ten, twelve, and twelve tracks respectively. In 2015, she released Bain de sons, consisting of eighteen songs. In 2017, she released "Patrimonie", an album regarding her early life, consisting of twelve tracks and produced by KMG Productions.

In July 2016, Ngono performed at the Viking Center in Maryland, US. In April 2017, she sang at SEG Geneva Arena for the Afrikan Zik Festival, and later at La Cigale, on 21 January 2017. In July 2018, Ngono headlined Afrofest at Toronto's Woodbine Beach.

In December 2018, Ngono went on a one-month national tour, visiting Yaoundé, Douala, Bafoussam, Ngaoundéré and Ebolowa.

== Personal life ==
In 2011, it was rumoured that Ngono died after childbirth in Paris – however, this was quickly debunked by her relatives. In February 2019, rumours surfaced that she had died in a car accident.

In 2011, Ngono criticized Cameroonian Minister of Culture Ama Tutu Muna for not doing enough to help artists – citing slow copyright request responses and limited financial support. In 2015, she donated equipment and supplies to FoundationFact, an orphanage in Yaoundé.

On 21 November 2018, Ngono married Aloys Tsafack, a Cameroonian manager and producer known as Dieu Cyclone, at a reception near Les Clayes-sous-Bois city hall. To maintain secrecy and avoid paparazzi, Ngono advertised the wedding was to be at 3:30 pm, then held it at 9:00 am.

Ngono is a mother of three children. Cameroonian media colloquially refers to Ngono as "La Reine de Bikutsi", which translates to "The Queen of Bikutsi".

== Discography ==
Lady Ponce discography
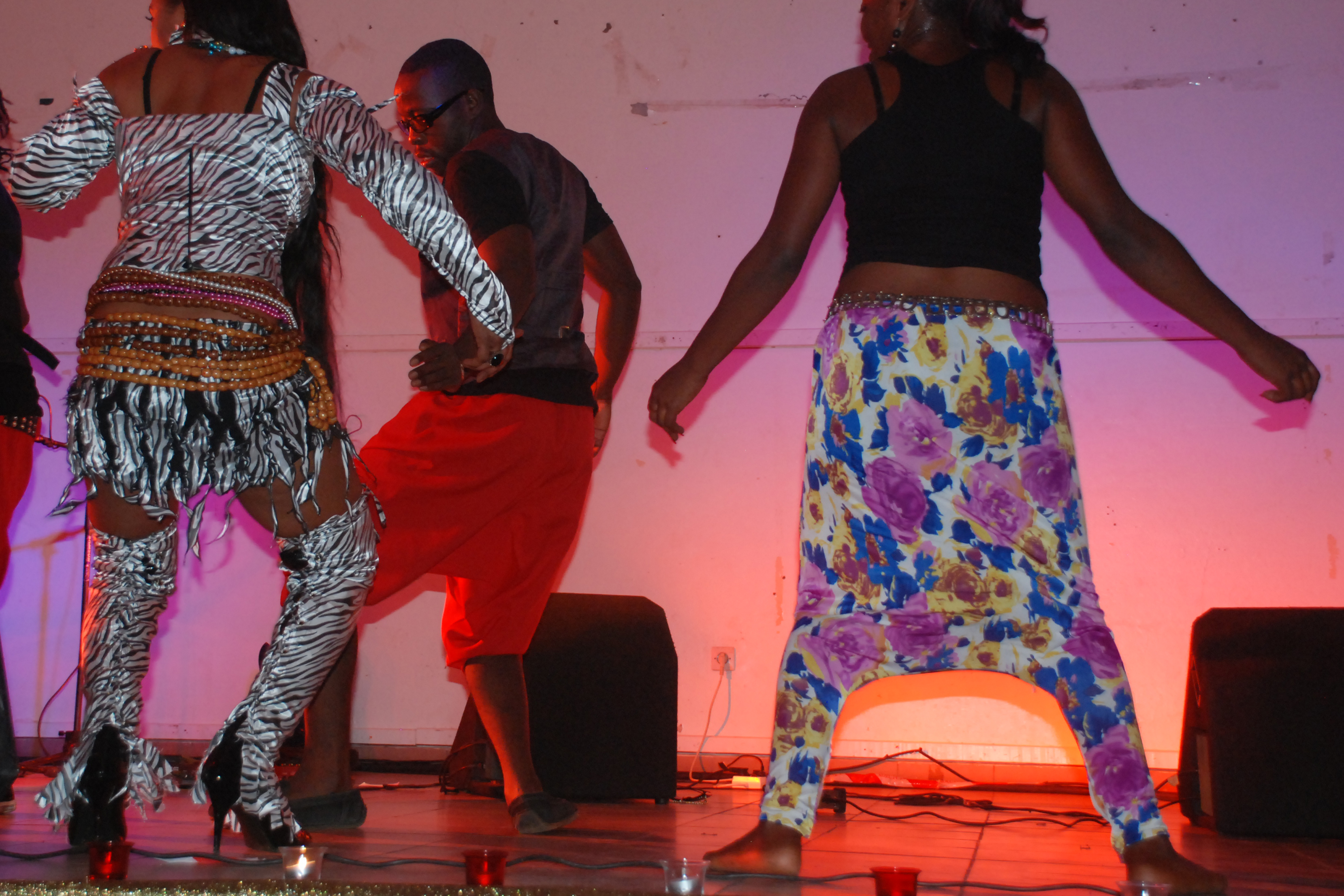
- Lady Ponce dancing at a concert
- Studio albums: 6
- Singles: 6

=== Albums ===
- Le ventre & le bas-ventre (2007)
- Confession (2009)
- La loi du talion (2011)
- Bombe atomique (2012)
- Bain de sons (2015)
- Patrimoine (2017)
- Légende (2025)

=== Singles ===
- La la la (2014)
- Obele (2017)
- Me Ndigui Yem (2017)
- Espoir (2017)
- Connais-tu l'amour (2017)
- Fidélité Kmer (2019)

== Awards ==
Year	Song	Category	Result	Reference
Canal 2'Or
2007	–	Best Voice	Won	
2007	–	Musical Revelation of the Year	Won	
2008	Treason	Song of the Year	Won	
2008	–	Best Female Artist of the Year	Won	
2013	Pipiyou	Best Music Video	Nominated	
2013	Secouer Secouer	Song of the Year	Nominated	
2013	–	Best Female Artist of the Year	Nominated	
2017	O bale ma	Best Music Video	Nominated	
2017	–	Best Female Artist of Year	Nominated	
2019	–	Best Folk Artist of the Year	TBA	
2019	–	Best Female Artist of the Year	TBA	
Radio Tiéméni Siantou (RTS) Awards
2007	–	Performance of the Year	Won	
2007	–	Bikutsi Artist of the Year	Won	
2008	–	Artist of the Year	Won	
Festival Bikutsi
2008	–	Bikutsi Artist of the Year	Won	
Kora Awards
2012	–	Best Female Artist – Central Africa	Won	
2012	Hommage à Jésus	Best Female Artist – Religious Music	Nominated	

On 20 May 2014, Ngono was awarded with the Order of Valour by president Paul Biya.
