= Kevin Brown (blues musician) =

- Born: 1950 (age 75–76); Bamber Bridge, Preston, Lancashire, England
- Genre: Blues
- Occupations: Guitarist, singer, songwriter
- Instruments: Acoustic guitar, lap steel guitar, slide guitar, weissenborn
- Years active: Late 1970s–present
- Website: Official website

Kevin Brown (born 1950) is an English blues guitarist, songwriter and singer. His main genre is the blues, although he has spread out his style to incorporate country, folk, Americana and world music over an almost forty-year professional career. He has released twelve albums to date, which included collaborations with Moussa Kouyate and Gary Rudd. Performing from the main stage at the Glastonbury Festival to the bars of Texas, Mark Knopfler stated that Brown "offers far more than your average slide player".

== Life and career ==
Brown was born in Bamber Bridge, Preston, Lancashire, England, the son of a sign writer and schoolteacher. At the age of 14, he watched Sister Rosetta Tharpe and Muddy Waters perform on television and was inspired to follow blues music. He studied at both the Dartington College of Arts and Rolle College, Exmouth, Devon. A while later in 1970, Brown was busking on Portobello Road in London and his performance was seen by Son House, who was appearing in London at the time. Brown became friends with Son House and took some guitar intuition from him. In 1978, Brown relocated to Bath, Somerset, and worked as an art teacher before electing to pursue a career as a professional musician. In 1982, he was heard by the record producer, Joe Boyd and this association led to Brown releasing his debut album, Road Dreams on Hannibal Records. That release was followed by Rust (1988) which eventually appeared on Rykodisc following their acquisition of Hannibal. It was nominated for 'best blues album of the year' by the British Blues Foundation.

The acclaim garnered by his first two albums, led Brown to sign with Chrysalis Records in 1990. Time Marches On became Brown's next album. In 1998, Brown issued an instrumental album, Sunny Side Up, by which time he was releasing material on his own record label, Doodah Records. Mojave Dust followed in 2001, before a collaboration with the Malian kora virtuoso, Moussa Kouyate saw the release of their joint effort Kora Blues (2004).

Brown toured widely in the late 1990s and 2000s, having lived and worked in Austin, Texas, United States, in the early 1980s. He also performed on the main stage at the Glastonbury Festival during those years. After the release of two solo efforts in 2010, Brown met up with fellow guitarist and bass player, Gary Rudd, forming a duo named Shackdusters. Their debut joint release was Home and Dry (2011), with Home for Christmas following the next year. In 2012, they performed at The Lichfield Festival. Brown's repertoire had by then extended from slide acoustic guitar to playing lap steel guitar and weissenborn. In November 2015, Brown released his latest album, Grit, produced by Neville Farmer. Grit, a so-called "live in the studio" album, saw a guest appearance from fellow guitarist and vocalist Andy Fairweather Low. The album included the song, "Lancashire Blood on a Texas Floor", in homage to two casualties at the Battle of the Alamo, who both hailed Brown's home town of Preston. Whilst, "The Ballad of J. J. Cale", paid tribute to another of Brown's musical inspirations, J. J. Cale.

During the coronavirus pandemic, he live-streamed on his Facebook page every Sunday night to raise money for Julian House, a homeless charity based in Bath.

Brown now mainly appears in South West England.

== Discography ==
Year	Title	Record label	Billed as
1983	Road Dreams	Hannibal Records	
1988	Rust	Hannibal Records / Rykodisc	
1993	Time Marches On	Taxim Records	
1999	Sunny Side Up	Doodah Records	
2001	Mojave Dust	Doodah Records / Dixiefrog	
2002	Kora Blues	Doodah Records	Kevin Brown and Moussa Kouyate
2005	Tin Church	Doodah Records	
2010	Slideville	Doodah Records	
2010	Abundance	Doodah Records	
2011	Home and Dry	Doodah Records	Shackdusters
2012	Home for Christmas	Doodah Records	Shackdusters
2015	Grit	Doodah Records	
2019	6 Strings and a Dream	Doodah Records	
