= List of lighthouses in Togo =

This is a list of lighthouses in Togo.

== Lighthouses ==
| Name | Image | Year built | Location & coordinates | Class of light | Focal height | NGA number | Admiralty number | Range nml |
|---|---|---|---|---|---|---|---|---|
| Baguida Lighthouse | | n/a | Baguida; 6°09′34.5″N 1°19′29.3″E | Oc WR 3s. | 38 metres (125 ft) | 24944 | D3173 | white: 17 : red: 13 |
| Kpémé Lighthouse | | n/a | Aného; 6°11′54.2″N 1°31′00.6″E | Oc (2) W 6s. | 25 metres (82 ft) | 24948 | D3176 | 11 |
| Lomé Jetée Est Lighthouse | | n/a | Lomé; 6°08′15.2″N 1°17′24.8″E | Oc G 6s. | 13 metres (43 ft) | 24936 | D3174.2 | 5 |
| Lomé Jetée Ouest Lighthouse | | n7a | Lomé; 6°08′02.7″N 1°17′30.8″E | Oc R 6s. | 13 metres (43 ft) | 24932 | D3174 | 5 |
| Lomé Lighthouse | | n/a | Lomé; 6°08′09.6″N 1°14′57.7″E | Fl (2) W 10s. | 38 metres (125 ft) | 24928 | D3171 | 20 |

== See also ==
- List of lighthouses in Ghana (to the west)
- List of lighthouses in Benin (to the east)
- Lists of lighthouses and lightvessels
