= List of lighthouses in Benin =

This is a list of lighthouses in Benin.

== Lighthouses ==
Name	Image	Year built	Location & coordinates	Class of light	Focal height	NGA number	Admiralty number	Range nml
Cotonou Lighthouse		1968	Cotonou; 6°21′06.4″N 2°26′28.4″E	Fl W 5s.	31 metres (102 ft)	24952	D3178	20
Cotonou Dique Ouest Lighthouse		n/a	Cotonou; 6°22′14.5″N 2°25′42.4″E	Oc (2) R 6s.	10 metres (33 ft)	24956	D3179	8
Cotonou North Breakwater Lighthouse		n/a	Cotonou; 6°20′42.6″N 2°25′54.9″E	Iso G 4s.	8 metres (26 ft)	24964	D3181	4

== See also ==
- List of lighthouses in Togo (to the west)
- List of lighthouses in Nigeria (to the east)
- Lists of lighthouses and lightvessels
