= List of lighthouses in Nigeria =

This is a list of lighthouses in Nigeria.

== Lighthouses ==
Name	Image	Year built	Location & coordinates	Class of light	Focal height	NGA number	Admiralty number	Range nml
Beecroft Point Lighthouse		1891	Lagos; 6°24′11.8″N 3°23′01.8″E	Fl (2) W 15s.	26 metres (85 ft)	24968	D3870	15
Bonny Lighthouse		~1950s	Bonny Island; 4°24′14.1″N 7°08′08.6″E	Fl (2) W 20s.	40 metres (130 ft)	25064	D3940	17
Lagos East Mole Lighthouse		n/a	Lagos; 6°23′46.2″N 3°24′13.0″E	Fl G 3s.	9 metres (30 ft)	24976	D3873	5
Ogidigben Lighthouse		~1950s	Escravos River; 5°33′36.0″N 5°10′54.0″E (NGA)	Fl (3) W 10s.	40 metres (130 ft)	25036	D3900	17
Palm Point Lighthouse		1910	Akassa; 4°16′37.9″N 6°05′06.6″E	Fl W 10s.	30 metres (98 ft)	25056	D3930	15

== See also ==
- List of lighthouses in Benin (to the west)
- List of lighthouses in Cameroon (to the east)
- Lists of lighthouses and lightvessels
