= Cotonou Lighthouse =

Lighthouse in Cotonou, Benin

Cotonou Lighthouses
- Location: Cotonou, Littoral, Benin
- Coordinates: 6°21′06″N 2°26′28″E
- Constructed: 1910

Cotonou Lighthouse is a lighthouse in Cotonou, Benin. It was established in 1910. A second skeletal tower was built in 1928, and that light was moved to the water tower in 1968.

== See also ==
- List of lighthouses in Benin
