= K-Tino =

Cameroonian singer (born 1966)

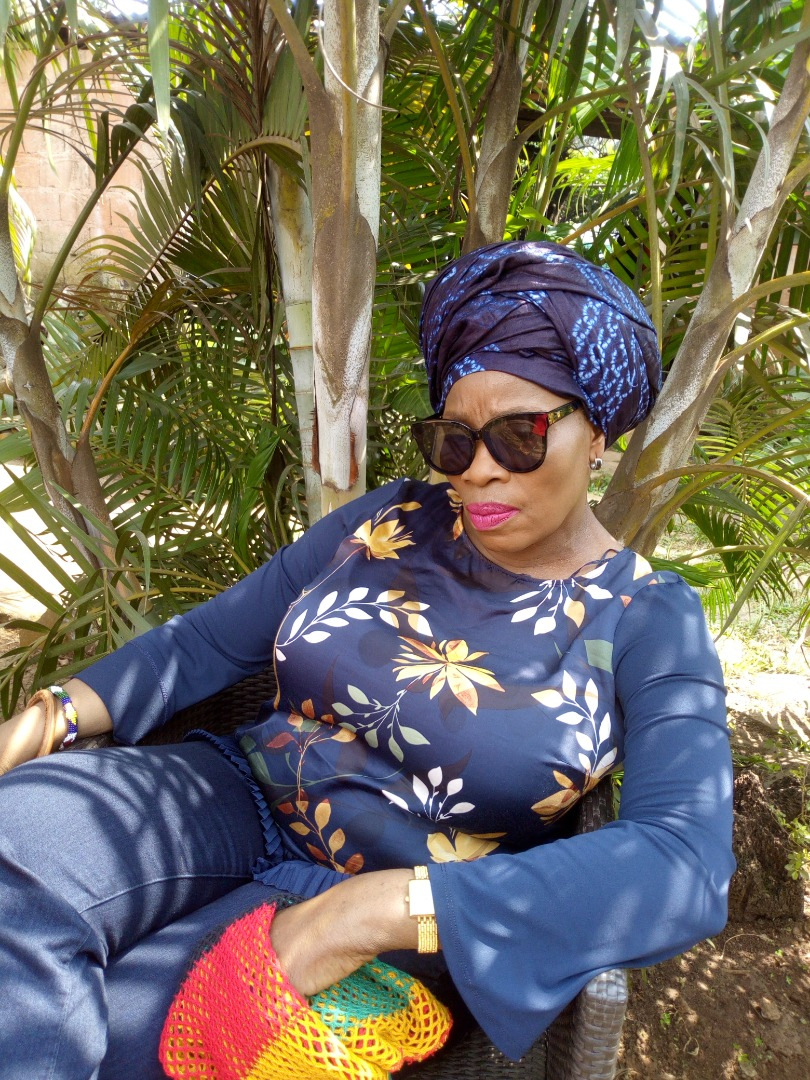
- K-Tino in 2018

Background information
- Also known as: Catino
- Born: Cathérine Edoa Ngoa; 12 October 1966 (age 59)
- Origin: Yaoundé, Cameroon
- Genres: Bikutsi
- Occupation: Musician
- Instrument: Singer
- Years active: 2000–present

K-Tino (born 12 October 1966 as Cathérine Edoa Ngoa) is a Cameroonian singer who shot to fame in her home country with her energetic bikutsi music. She is the biological daughter of Kamgaing Paul a former businessman in Cameroon who died in July 2022.

Bikutsi music is characterized by an up-tempo 6/8 rhythm, danced with energetic pulsations of shoulders and/or pelvis. K-Tino (on earlier albums Catino) has been one of the most prominent proponents of bikutsi for more than ten years. Her songs are highly graphic, despite the fact that she denies being vulgar, saying "I'm not vulgar, and I don't put on vulgar shows. If I'm vulgar, then so is the Ewondo language." The complexity of the sexual content, which is veiled by slightly changing non-vulgar terms in the Ewondo language, is a key to bikutsi. K-Tino was dubbed "femme du peuple," "mama bonheur," and "mama la joie" by the media. K-Tino began singing in Chacal and Escalier Bar, later joining the band Les Zombies de la Capitale.

K-tino said in early 2014 that she had stopped making obscene music and had dedicated her life to God. She is starting a church called Celestial City in the Gabonese capital.

K-Tino's daughter, K-Wash, is also a bikutsi performer.

== Reception ==
Some member of the press were critical of the sexual nature of the lyrics, including a writer for the newspaper Mutations who said, ""Cameroon has exhibited a looseness of morals unprecedented. The debauchery and the sexual perversions are of the most immoral, and affect everyone. Sex, of the most vulgar manner, is more and more present in the media and the public, marked by eccentric, indecent clothing intended to provoke sensual pleasure, nudity, and sensuality."
