= Kribi Lighthouse =

Lighthouse in Cameroon

Kribi Range Front Lighthouse
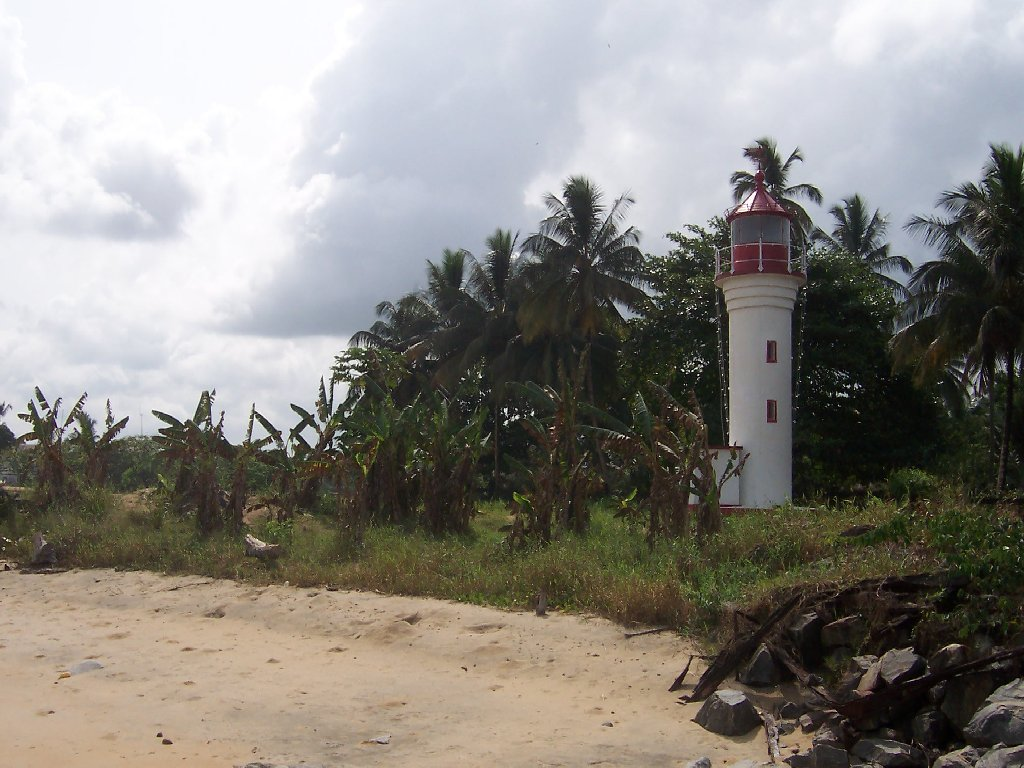
- Kribi Lighthouse
- Location: Kribi, Océan, Kribi, Cameroon
- Coordinates: 2°56′22″N 9°54′14″E

Tower
- Construction: masonry tower
- Height: 15 m (49 ft)
- Shape: cylindrical tower with balcony and lantern
- Markings: white tower, red balcony and lantern

Light
- First lit: 1906
- Focal height: 18 m (59 ft)
- Range: 14 nmi (26 km; 16 mi)
- Characteristic: Fl(3) W 12s

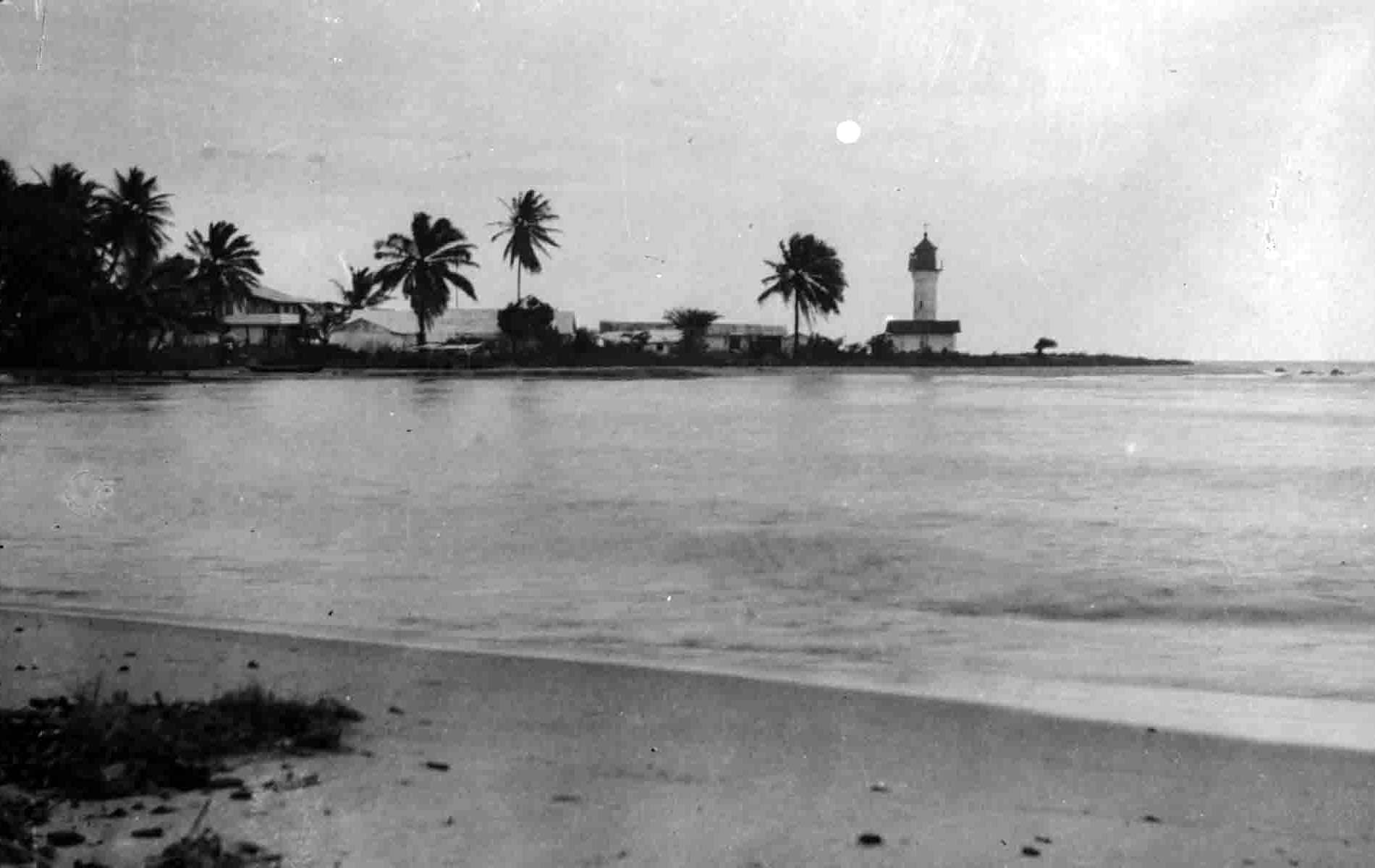
The lighthouse, after it was constructed, with the keeper's cottage.

Kribi Lighthouse is located in Kribi, in the southern part of Cameroon near the Gulf of Guinea. It is a historic structure.

== History ==
The lighthouse was built in 1906 by the German colonialists who had occupied Kamerun (the lighthouse and a church are the legacy of German colonial construction in the town); today it is part of Francophone Cameroon. In the early days there was a keeper's cottage by the lighthouse, but that has since been removed. Today, it is by the beach resort of Kribi and just north of the tourist destination Lobe Waterfall. The location of the lighthouse at Kribi matched the town's status as the centre of trade for the southern region, which was notable for trading rubber and ivory.

== Location ==
The local Hotel du Phare, is termed as the "host hotel" of the lighthouse by the travel industry, at the Kienké River. The memorial of the Batanga Tragedy stands about 15 meters away from the lighthouse. Douala is a few hours' drive away.

== Specifications ==
The tower is circular and painted white with a red top where the gallery is located. It is 15 metres tall by itself, but 18 metres above sea level. Its three white flashes every 12 seconds are visible up to 14 nautical miles away. From the rear there is a continuous green light visible on the range line to the steeple of the village church. The year round wind averages are 83% onshore towards 45 degrees north. Since the first half of 2006 it has been listed as historic in the World List of Lights.

== See also ==
- List of lighthouses in Cameroon
