= Kribi =

Sea port in Cameroon

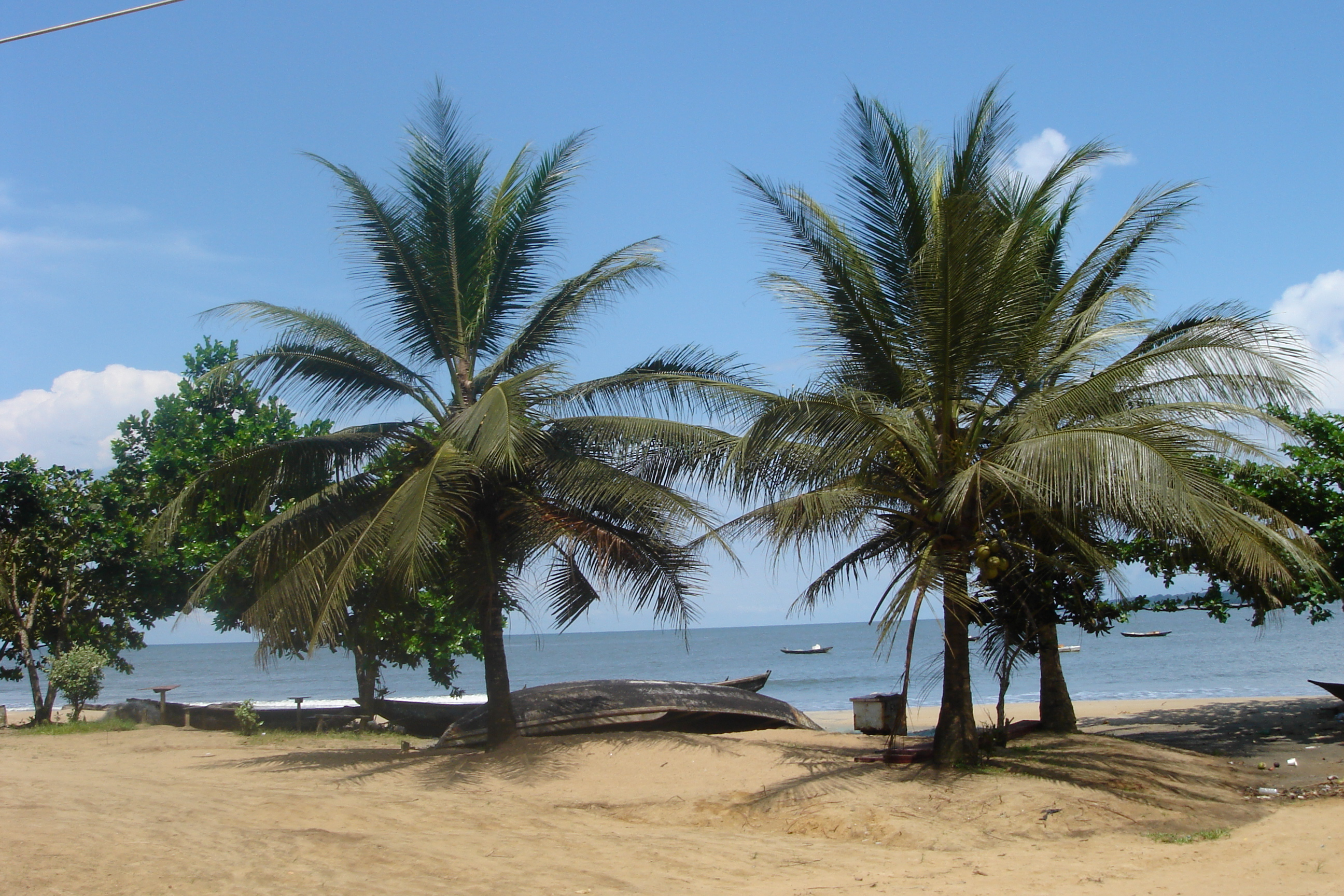
- Kribi beach, 2006

- Location in Cameroon; Placement on map is approximate
- Coordinates: 02°56′06″N 09°54′36″E
- Country: Cameroon
- Province: South
- Department: Océan
- Elevation: 13 m (43 ft)

Population (2012)
  - Total: 80,957

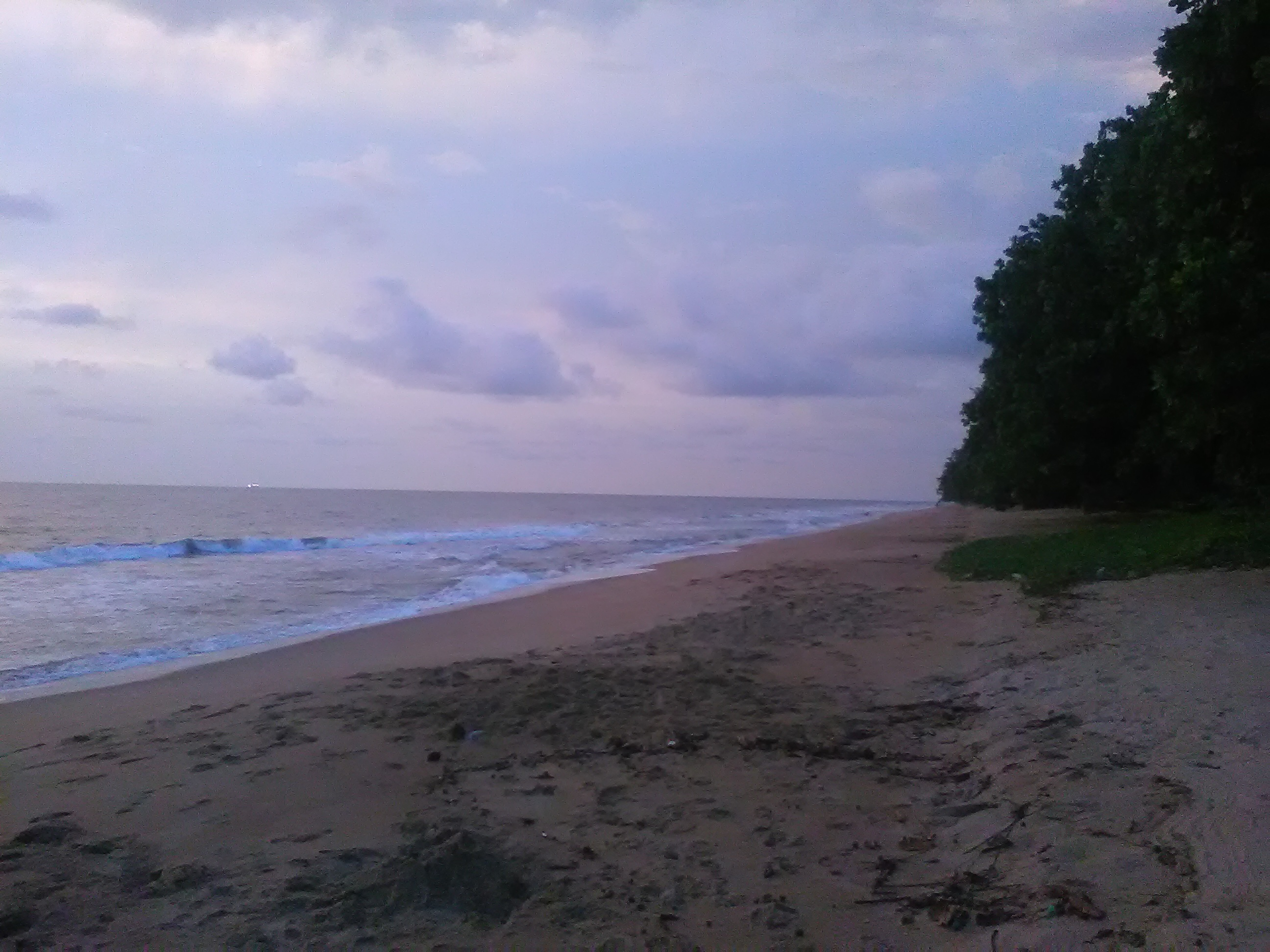
Kribi Beach in the evening

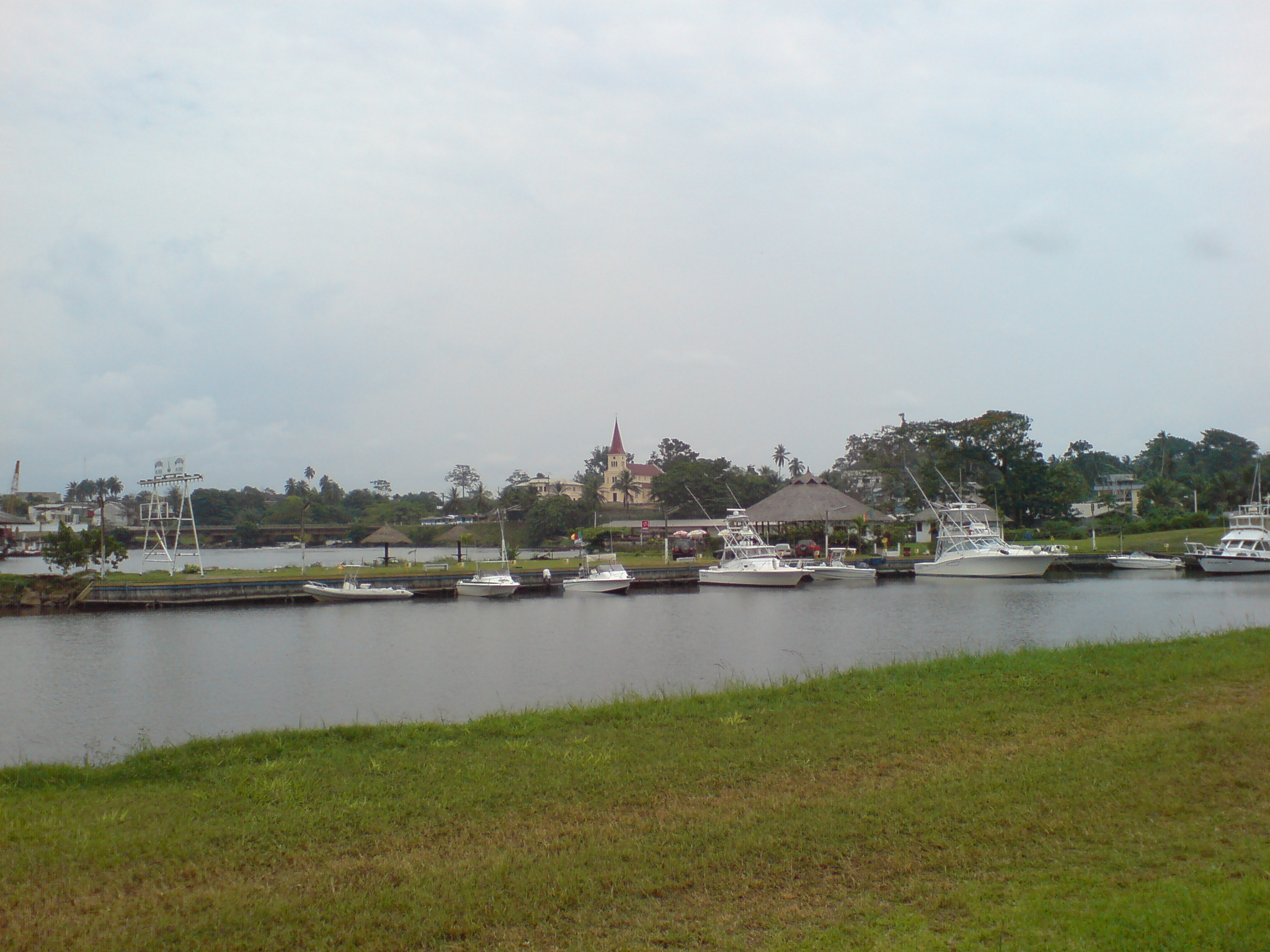
Kribi port, 2008

Kribi is a coastal town in the South region of Cameroon, located along Gulf of Guinea where the Lobé River meets the Atlantic Ocean. The town is known for its beaches, seafood culture, and the Lobé Waterfalls (Chutes de la Lobé), where the river flows into the ocean. The town contains a German colonial lighthouse, built in 1906.

== Location ==
The coastal town of Kribi lies on the Gulf of Guinea, in Océan Department, South Province, at the mouth of the Kienké River. This location, lies approximately 150 kilometres (93 mi), by road, south of Douala, the largest city in Cameroon and the busiest seaport in the country. The coordinates of Kribi are: 2° 56' 6.00"N, 9° 54' 36.00"E (Latitude: 2.9350; Longitude: 9.9100)

== Overview ==
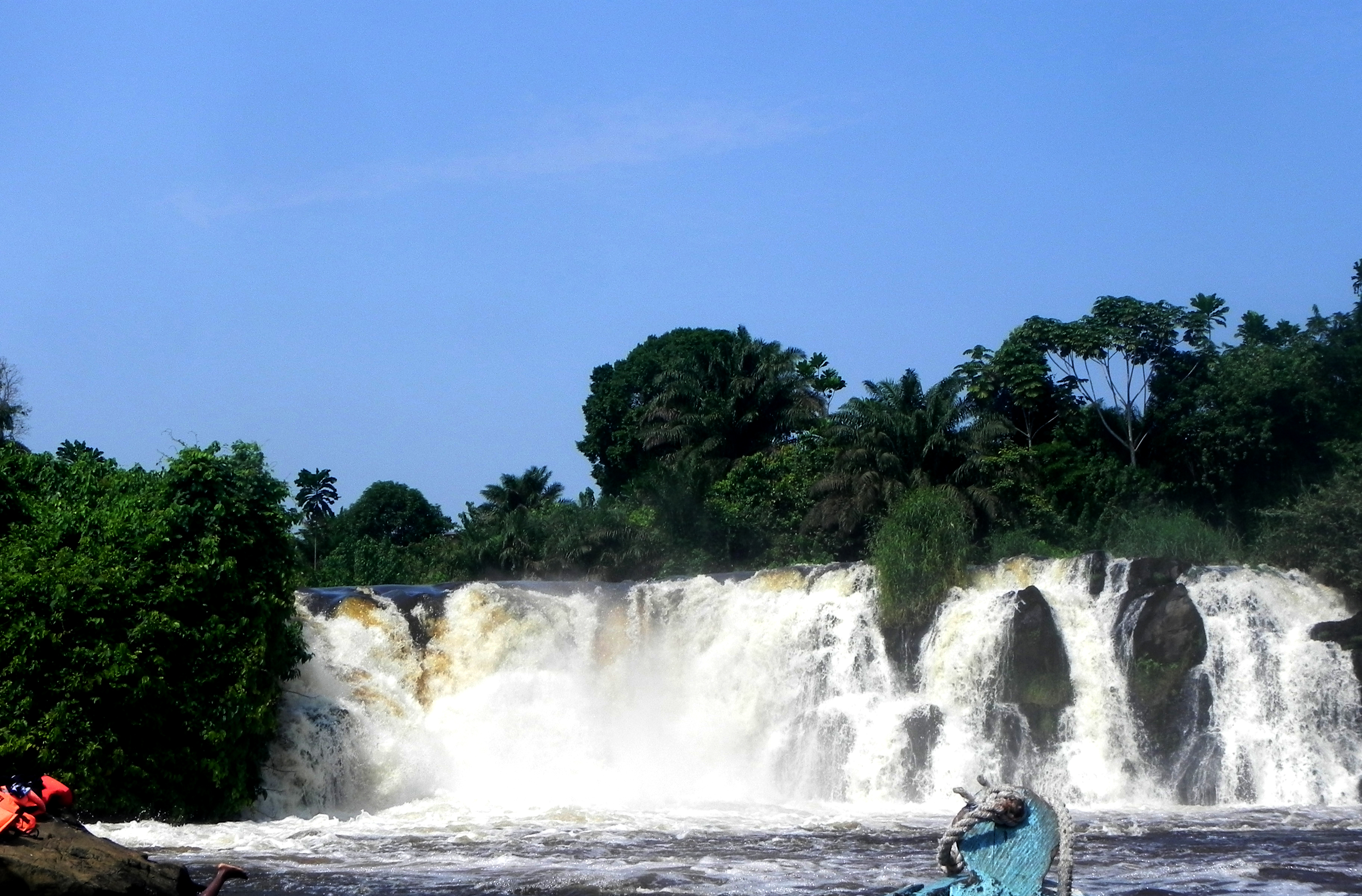
Lobé waterfalls, Cameroon 2017

It has an estimated population of 55,401. It services sea traffic in the Gulf of Guinea and also lies near the terminus of the Chad-Cameroon pipeline. The Lobé Waterfalls are nearby and there is a road inland, through the Littoral Evergreen Forest, as far as Bipindi and Lolodorf where native communities of Pygmies are found.

== Municipal Structure ==
Kribi is more of a municipality than a developed town. The town is divided into Kribi Première, with its main town, Massaka, and Kribi Deuxième, with its main town, Dombé.

== Public health ==
A January 2024 study found high levels of parasitic worm eggs and larvae in waters along Kribi's famed beach. The species included tapeworms and nematode worms that cause significant morbidity in humans, likely passed from human fecal material in waste water.

== Kribi Power Station ==
Kribi Power Development Company (KPDC) has built a natural gas-powered electricity generating plant, Kribi Power Station, in the community of Mpolongwe, approximately 10 kilometres (6.2 mi), north of the Kribi central business district. The 216 MW plant that cost US$390 million (CFA:176.3 billion) to build, came on line in 2013. It is now owned by Globeleq A second phase expansion is planned.

== Port ==
Near Kribi is the location of a proposed port for the export of iron ore from about 500 kilometres (310 mi) away and also bauxite. Since there is no natural harbour at Kribi, the port itself would be several kilometres offshore where deepwater of at least 20 metres (66 ft) is suitable for large Capesize ships. It is also the location for the Kribi Lighthouse.

Location of Kribi in Cameroon

By 2017, the port development had started, and by 2020 the port was being developed by Louis Berger.

The Kribi deep-water port's first container terminal was inaugurated in March 2018, giving Cameroon its first deep-sea port; with a depth of about 15 metres it can accommodate vessels carrying up to around 8,000 containers. The terminal is operated under a 25-year concession by Kribi Conteneurs Terminal (KCT), a consortium of CMA CGM, the China Harbour Engineering Company and Bolloré (now Africa Global Logistics). A second terminal, with a 715-metre quay, was added from 2019, raising the port's annual capacity to more than one million TEU.

The port will be served by railways of two different gauges, 1435mm and 1000mm. There will be a new 130 km rail link between the port and the existing metre gauge network at Edéa. Dual gauge sleepers could be installed so that the new lines are compatible with the proposed African Integrated High Speed Rail Network (AIHSRN).

The port of Kribi is supported by Autonome de Kribi It is also cooperates with the Cameroon National Ports Authority (APN) The port of Kribi is a member of the International Association of Ports and Harbors (IAPH).

== Iron mine ==
The iron ore will come from mines near Mbalam in Cameroon and near Nabeba in Republic of Congo. The mines would have an output of approximately 35 million tonnes per year, with a 30-year or so lifespan. This line is to be standard gauge lines (1435mm) with a 37.5t axle load. In 2021, a contract was let to build the rail line to Mbalam.

== Bauxite mine ==
It is proposed to connect the port of Kribi to a new bauxite mine in the north of Cameroon at Minim, Martap with a metre gauge (1000mm) 20t axle load railway. A link line junctions from the Camrail line at Edéa and proceeds 110 km to Kribi.

== International relations ==
=== Twin towns – Sister cities ===
Kribi is twinned with:

- Ouistreham, France
- St-Nazaire, France

== Climate ==
Kribi has a tropical monsoon climate (Köppen climate classification Am), very close to being classed as a tropical rainforest climate (Af). Due to its equatorial position, Kribi sees a short, fairly dry season and a long, very wet season. The hottest month, February, has an average high temperature of 32 °C or 89.6 °F, and an average low of 25 °C or 77 °F. The wettest month, September, sees 483 mm (19 in) of rain, with 27 of the 30 days typically seeing some rainfall. The driest month, December, sees 59 mm (2 in) of rain. The coolest month is August, with an average high of 28 °C or 82.4 °F, and a low of 23 °C or 73.4 °F. Humidity remains high year-round.

Climate data for Kribi, Cameroon
Month	Jan	Feb	Mar	Apr	May	Jun	Jul	Aug	Sep	Oct	Nov	Dec	Year
Mean daily maximum °C (°F)	32 (90)	32 (90)	32 (90)	32 (90)	31 (88)	30 (86)	29 (84)	28 (82)	29 (84)	30 (86)	31 (88)	31 (88)	31 (87)
Mean daily minimum °C (°F)	24 (75)	25 (77)	24 (75)	24 (75)	24 (75)	23 (73)	23 (73)	23 (73)	23 (73)	24 (75)	23 (73)	24 (75)	24 (74)
Average rainfall mm (inches)	68 (2.7)	84 (3.3)	194 (7.6)	236 (9.3)	296 (11.7)	281 (11.1)	240 (9.4)	313 (12.3)	483 (19.0)	456 (18.0)	160 (6.3)	59 (2.3)	2,870 (113)
Average rainy days	9	10	14	17	20	18	16	22	27	26	16	9	204
Source: World Meteorological Organisation (UN)

== Gallery ==
Storage of wood in the port, Kribi 1997

Shop on main street, Kribi 1997

The garden of Hotel De l'Océan, Kribi 1997

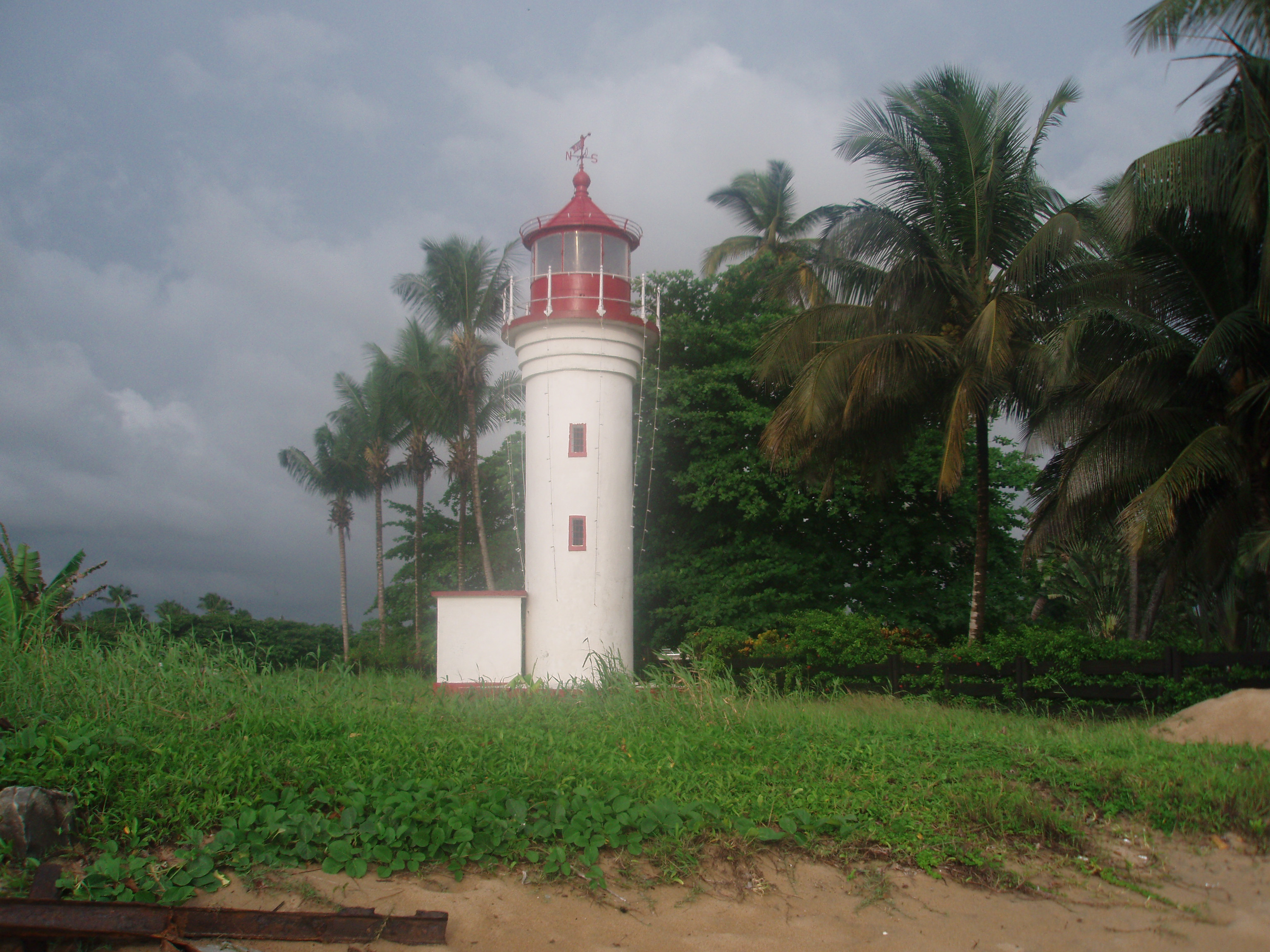
Lighthouse in Kribi, 2007

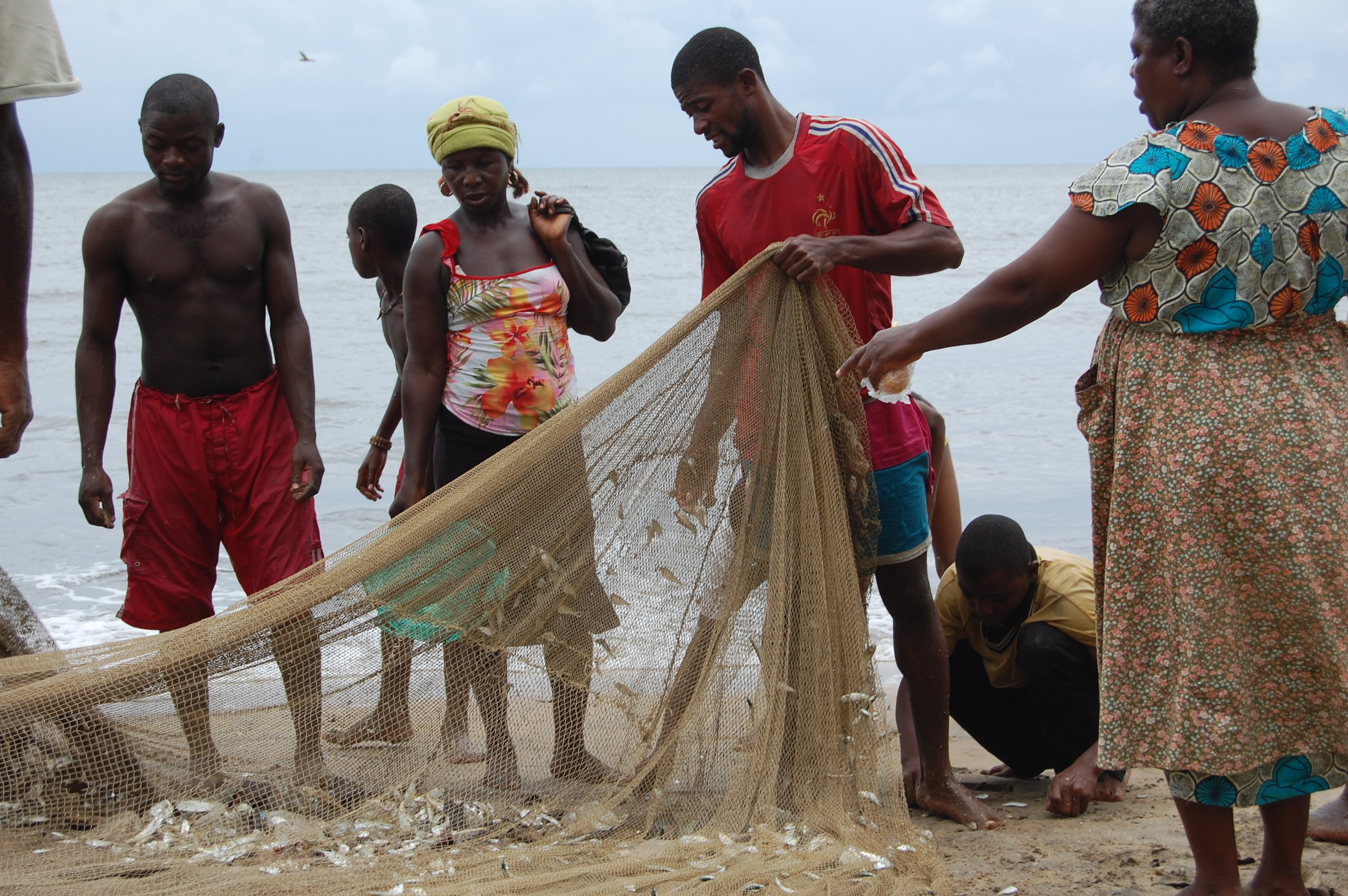
Fishermen at work, 2010

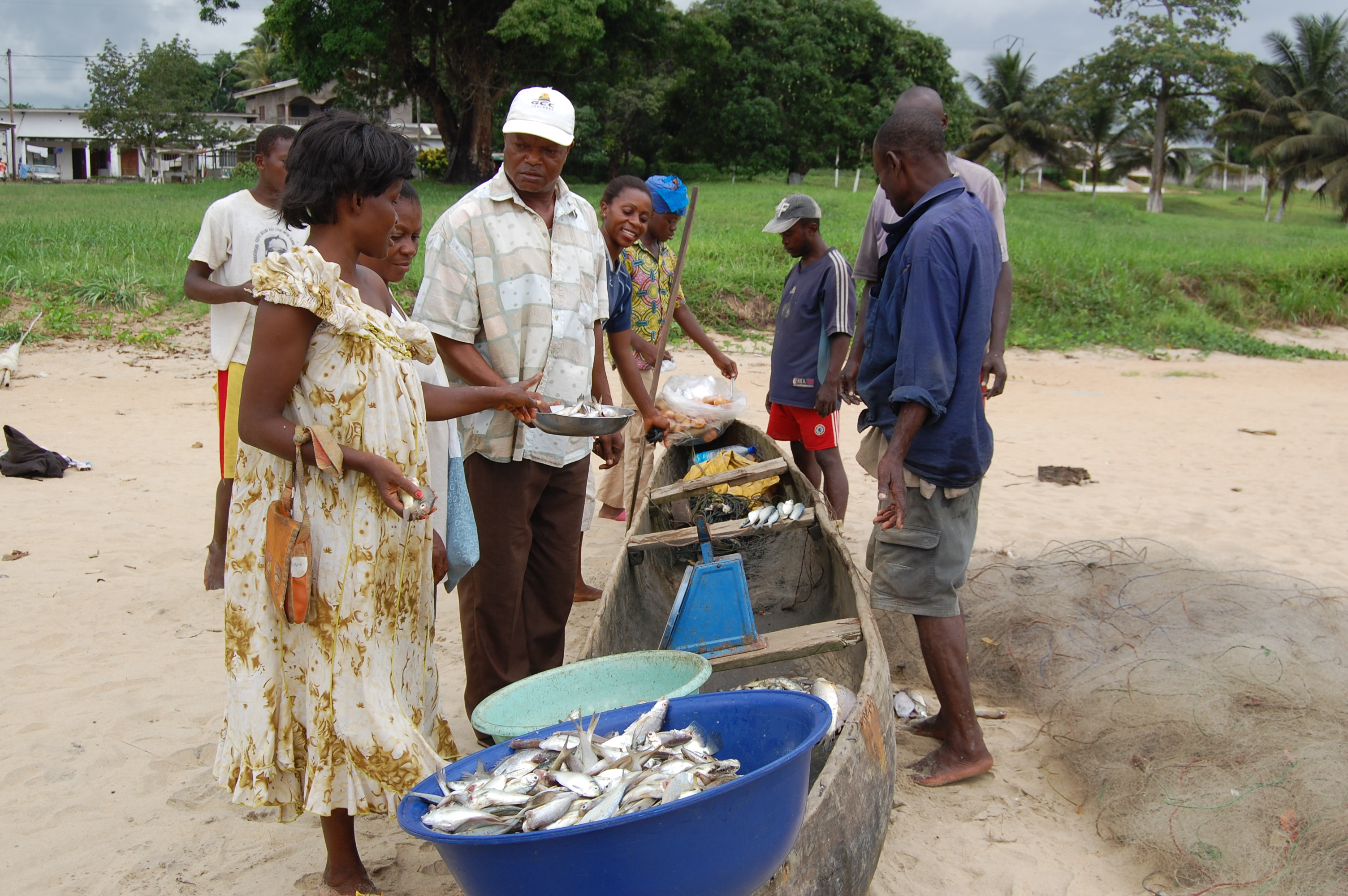
Fishermen selling fish, 2010

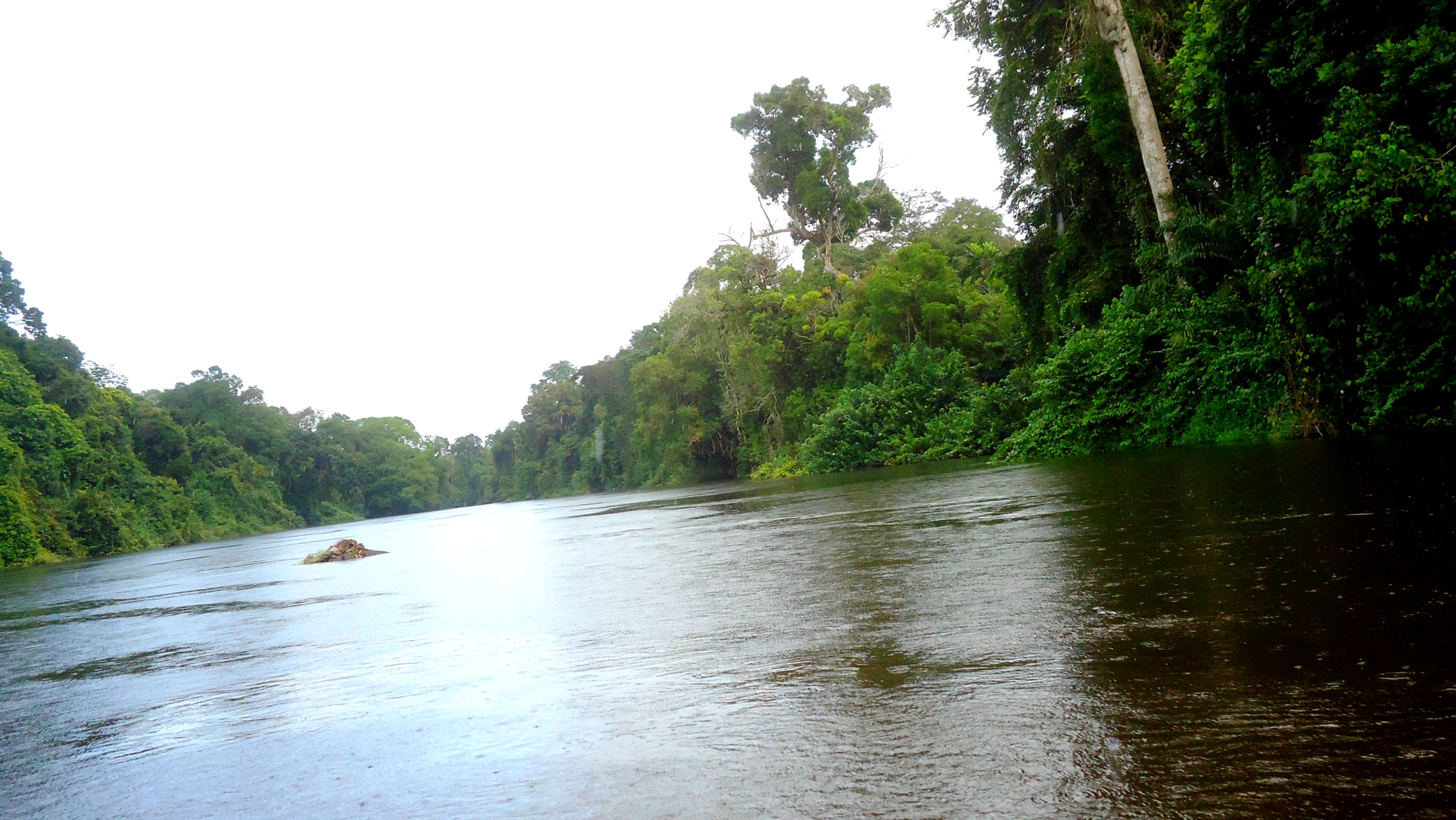
Lobé River, 2016

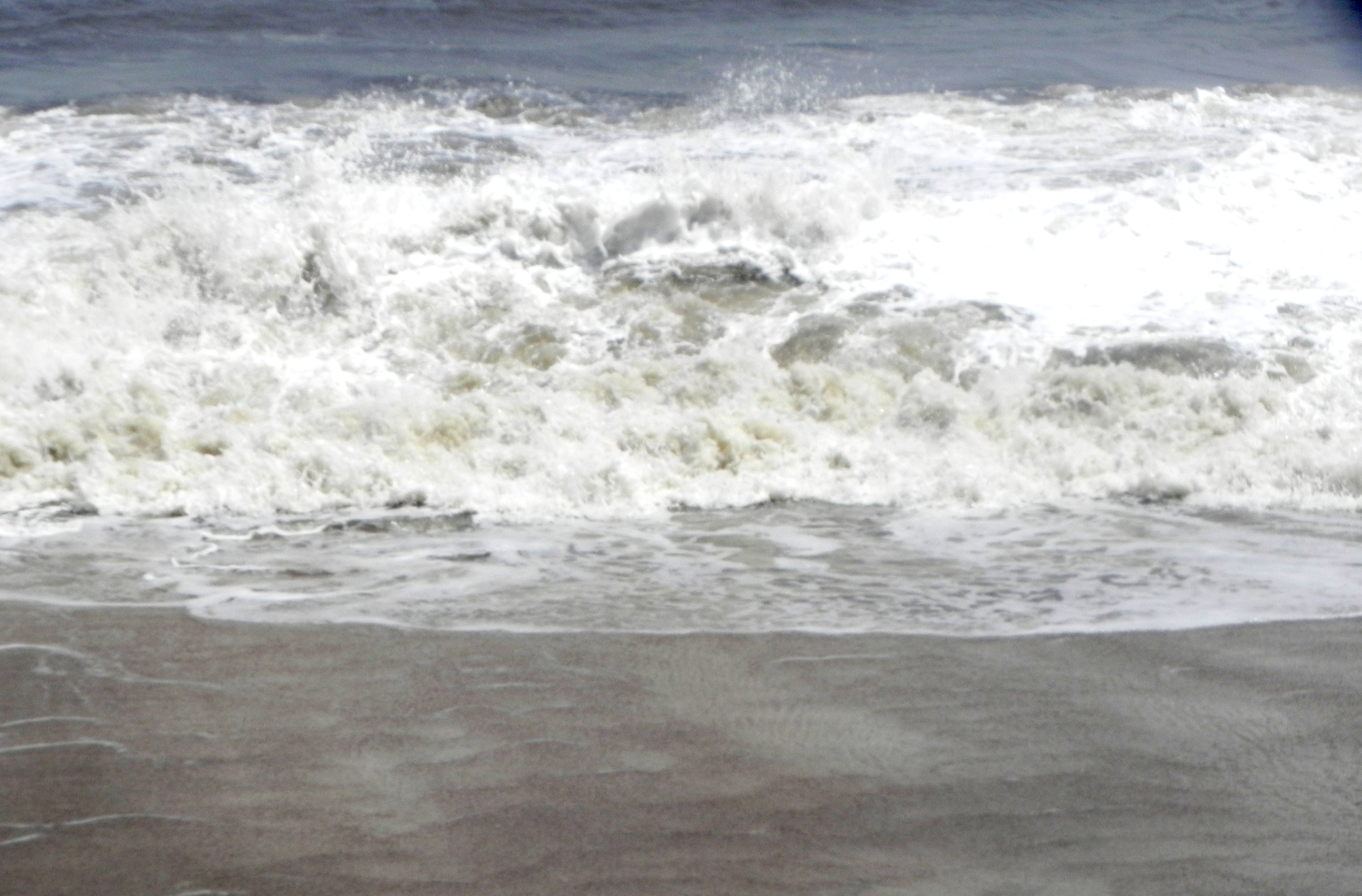
Kribi water waves, 2017

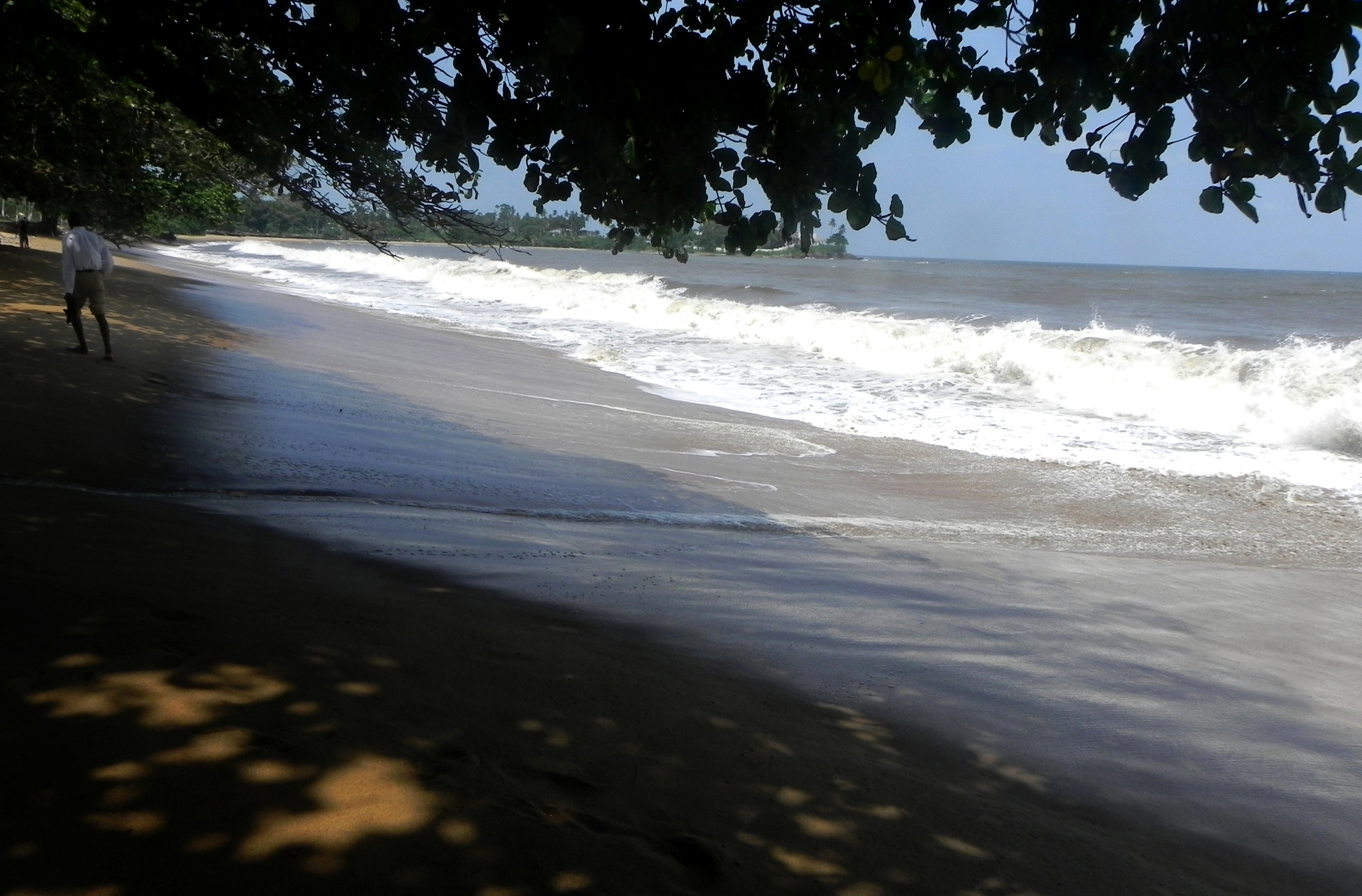
Kribi Beach, 2017

== See also ==
- Communes of Cameroon
- Océan
- South Province (Cameroon)
- Transport in Cameroon
