= Moussa Kouyate =

- Born: 1956 (age 68–69)
- Citizenship: Mali
- Occupation: Musician

Moussa Kouyate (born 1956) is a kora player from Bamako, Mali. His father, Batourou Sekou Kouyate, was also a prominent kora player.

== Biography ==
In 2003, Moussa Kouyaté came to Finland to record his album Finlandiafrica, which was produced by Marco Tikkanen and Jukka Viiri, which has been acclaimed in his home country. According to news from Bamako, the late Ali Farka Touré and Toumani Diabaté were inspired by his album to produce their own, that in turn, won a Grammy Award in the USA in 2005 shortly before Ali Farka died from cancer. Ali Farka Touré and Moussa Kouyate are from the same village in Mali, Niafunké, where a museum is held in the name of Ali Farka, who was the Mayor or Niafunké and a farmer until his last days.

A collaboration with the English blues musician, Kevin Brown, saw the release of their joint effort, Kora Blues in 2002.

== See also ==
- Kora (instrument)
- Music of Mali
