= Anne-Marie Nzié =

Cameroonian singer (1932–2016)

- Born: 1932; Lolodorf, Cameroon
- Died: 24 May 2016 (aged 83–84); Cameroon
- Occupation: Bikutsi singer

Anne-Marie Nzié (1932 – 24 May 2016) was a Cameroonian bikutsi singer.

== Biography ==
Anne-Marie Nzié was born in Bibia, Lolodorf, Cameroon, in 1932. Her father was a guitarist and at the age of eight she began singing in a church choir in the village where he was a pastor. In the 1940s, Nzié began performing bikutsi, the music native to her home in central Cameroon. At the age of 12, while recuperating in hospital from injuries sustained when she fell from a mango tree, she learned to play Hawaiian guitar with the help of her musician brother, Moise. (who used the name "Cromwell") She went on to support him in some of his concert appearances, and in 1954 they released their first single together, "Ma Ba Nze", on the Opika label. Her first songs were played in night clubs when she was 24. She won a government-sponsored guitar competition organised by the German guitarist/composer Siegfried Behrend, after which in the later 1950s she became a solo singer, accompanying herself on Hawaiian guitar. Making a mark on the international scene, she recorded in Paris, France, and signed with the Pathé-Marconi label.

Nzié remained active over the next five decades and helped to popularise bikutsi throughout Cameroon, as well as singing in festivals in Algiers, Dakar and Lagos, and teaching singing with the National Orchestra of Cameroon. Her long career earned her the epithets "Queen of Cameroonian Music", "Queen Mother of Cameroonian Music", and "Queen Mother of Bikutsi".

Nzié was a supporter of both of Cameroon's presidents, Ahmadou Ahidjo and Paul Biya. For example, she dedicated the song "Liberté" to Paul Biya and his Cameroon People's Democratic Movement (CPDM) political party. In 1992, the Social Democratic Front used the song during John Fru Ndi's presidential campaign; Nzié said that she was "vehemently opposed" to the move. In another incident, student protesters changed the lyrics of the song to say, "Paul Biya go away". Nzié responded by saying that the song was always intended to be pro-Biya and pro-CPDM.

Her successful album Liberté was recorded in 1984, following which Nzié retired to her village. After a long absence, she released the album Béza Ba Dzo in 1999. Coco Mbassi sang backup on the album, and one track featured Manu Dibango on saxophone and vocals.

Anne-Marie Nzié died in a hospital on 24 May 2016, after becoming ill earlier in that month.
