= Bikutsi =

Music genre from Cameroon

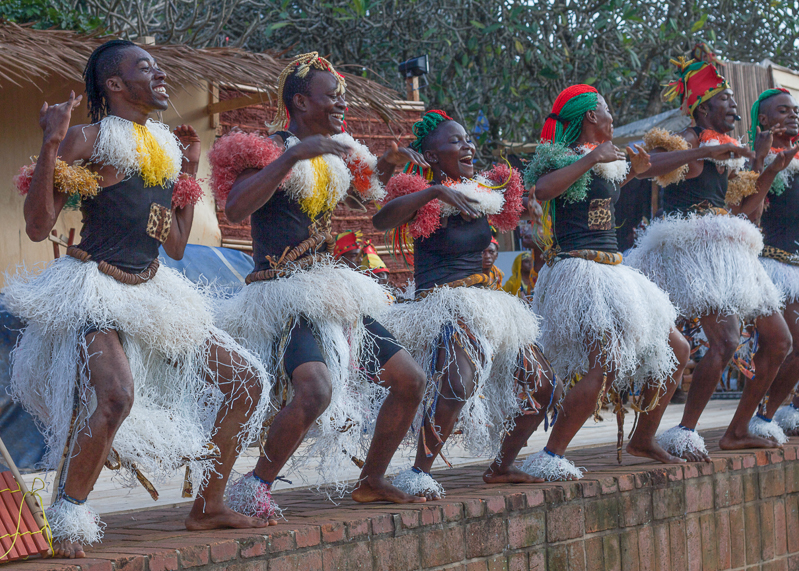
- Dance group
- Cultural origins: 1940s Beti

Regional scenes
- Cameroon

Bikutsi is a musical genre from Cameroon. It developed from the traditional styles of the Beti, or Ewondo, people, who live around the city of Yaoundé. It was popular in the middle of the 20th century in West Africa. It is primarily dance music.

== Etymology ==
The word 'bikutsi' literally means 'beat the earth' or 'let's beat the earth' (bi- indicates a plural, -kut- means 'to beat' and -chi means 'earth'.) The name indicates a dance that is accompanied by stomping the feet on the ground.

== Description ==
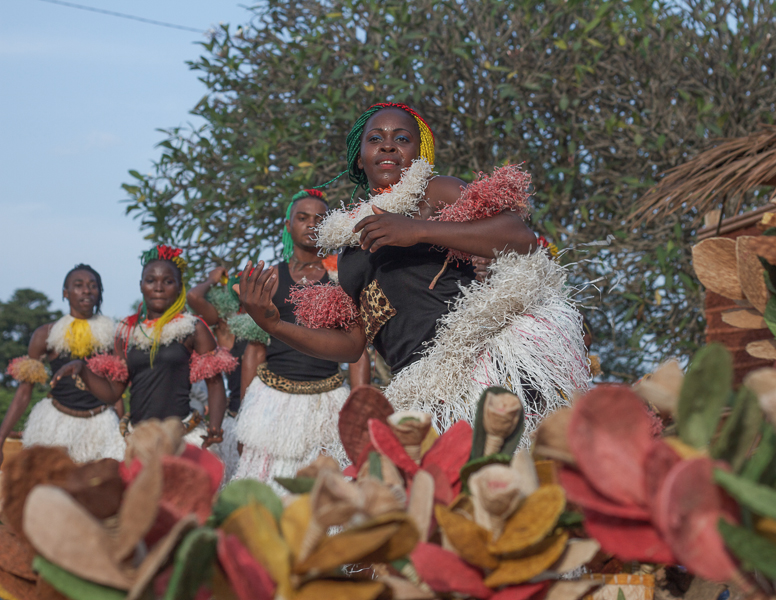
Dance group

Bikutsi is characterised by an intense 6/8 rhythm (3+3, with a strong "two" feel), though it is occasionally 9/8 and its tempo is usually quarternote. it is played at all sorts of Beti gatherings, including parties, funerals and weddings.

Beti gatherings fall into two major categories:

- Ekang phase: the time when imaginary, mythological and spiritual issues are discussed
- Bikutsi phase: when real-life issues are discussed

A double sided harp with calabash amplification called the mvet is used during these ceremonies, by Beti storytellers, who are viewed as using the mvet as an instrument of God to educate the people. The Ekang phase is intensely musical, and usually lasts all night. There are poetic recitations accompanied by clapping and dancing, with interludes for improvised and sometimes obscene performances on the balafon (a type of xylophone). These interludes signal the shift to the bikutsi phase, which is much less strictly structured than Ekang. During bikutsi, women dance and sing along with the balafon, and lyrics focus on relationships, sexuality and the lives of famous people. These female choruses are an integral part of bikutsi, and their intense dancing and screams are characteristic of the genre. Traditional bikutsi was often ironic in its content, as many modern bikutsi songs still are.

In its modern form, bikutsi is very popular, and rivals makossa as the country's most renowned style.

== History ==
Cameroon folk dance

Popular bikutsi first appeared in the 1940s with the recording of Anne-Marie Nzié. Some twenty years later, the style was electrified with the addition of keyboards and guitars. The most popular performer of this period was Messi Me Nkonda Martin, frontman for Los Camaroes and known as "the father of modern bikutsi music". In an effort to translate the sound and spirit of traditional bikutsi music to more modern terms, Messi incorporated the sound of a balafon into the electric guitar by linking together the guitar strings with lengths of cotton cord. Played in this way, the electric guitar sounded similar to the balafon. The music itself, then, was only slightly altered, while the image and outside perception of bikutsi music was changed enormously. Other bands during this time, such as Les Vétérans, were also popular.

International acclaim began in 1987 with the formation of Les Têtes Brûlées by Jean Marie Ahanda. The late guitarist of Les Têtes Brulées, Zanzibar, invented the trick of damping the strings of his guitar with a strip of foam rubber to produce the music's characteristic balafon-like thunk. (The balafon is a marimba-like instrument that is widely used in African folk music.) More modern performers include Jimmy Mvondo Mvelé and Mbarga Soukous.

Present-day bikutsi as performed by artists like Lady Ponce, K-Tino, Racine Sagath and Natascha Bizo is sometimes regarded as controversial. It has been criticised for the perceived sexual content of its lyrics and dancing style. In this respect bikutsi resembles mapouka from Côte d'Ivoire, which is also considered indecent by many Africans. The main difference is that present day bikutsi is still often performed by female artists who use it as a means of self-expression in a traditionally male-dominated society.

Thus a singer like K-Tino, self-styled femme du peuple (woman of the people) sees herself as having an important part to play in the emancipation and liberation of the women of Cameroon.

Among the current crop of artists are Patou Bass and Ovasho Bens, the promoter of a dance and philosophy called "zig zag". His first album is composed not only of Cameroonian traditional rhythms but also West Indian zouk and Jamaican-style reggae.

Bikutsi has influenced Western musicians such as Paul Simon on his 1990 album The Rhythm of the Saints.
