= Joseph Beti Assomo =

Cameroonian politician

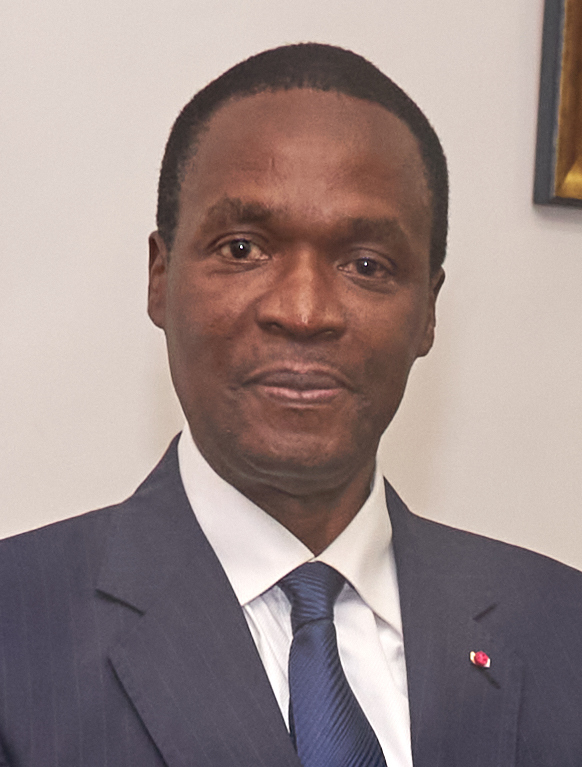
- Assomo in 2025

Minister of Defense of Cameroon
- Incumbent
- Assumed office 2 October 2015
- President: Paul Biya
- Prime Minister: Philemon Yang; Joseph Dion Ngute
- Preceded by: Edgar Alain Mebe Ngo'o

Governor of Far North Region
- In office 2012 – 2 October 2015
- Preceded by: Francis Fai Yengo
- Succeeded by: Samuel Dieudonne Ivaha Diboua

Governor of Littoral Region
- In office 2010–2012
- Preceded by: Ahmadou Tidjani
- Succeeded by: Augustine Awa Fonka

Personal details
- Born: 17 August 1959 (age 67) Ayos, Nyong-et-Mfoumou, Cameroon
- Education: National School of Administration and Magistracy of Cameroon

Joseph Beti Assomo is a Cameroonian politician who has served as the Minister of Defense of Cameroon since 2015. Assomo also served as the governor of Far North Region between 2010 and 2012 and Littoral Region between 2012 and 2015.

== Biography ==
Assomo was born on 17 August 1959 in Ayos, Nyong-et-Mfoumou division, Cameroon. Assomo received his primary education at Ayos Main School and his secondary education at Akonolinga Mixed High School. He was admitted to both the International School of Journalism in Yaoundé and the National School of Administration and Magistracy of Cameroon. Assomo opted for the latter, majoring in general administration.

Assomo began his professional career in 1983, as head of the cabinet of the governor of South Region, working in Ebolowa. Between 1990 and 1998, he was head of the sub-prefect of Ma'an, head of the sub-prefect of Mbankomo, and head of the Yaounde III sub-prefect. Between 1998 and 2005, he was head of Dja-et-Lobo department, and later head of Mfoundi department in 2005 and 2010. Between 2010 and 2012, he served as the governor of Far North Region and then governor of Littoral Region between 2012 and 2015. As governor of Littoral, Assomo hosted joint American and Cameroonian military exercises in the region.

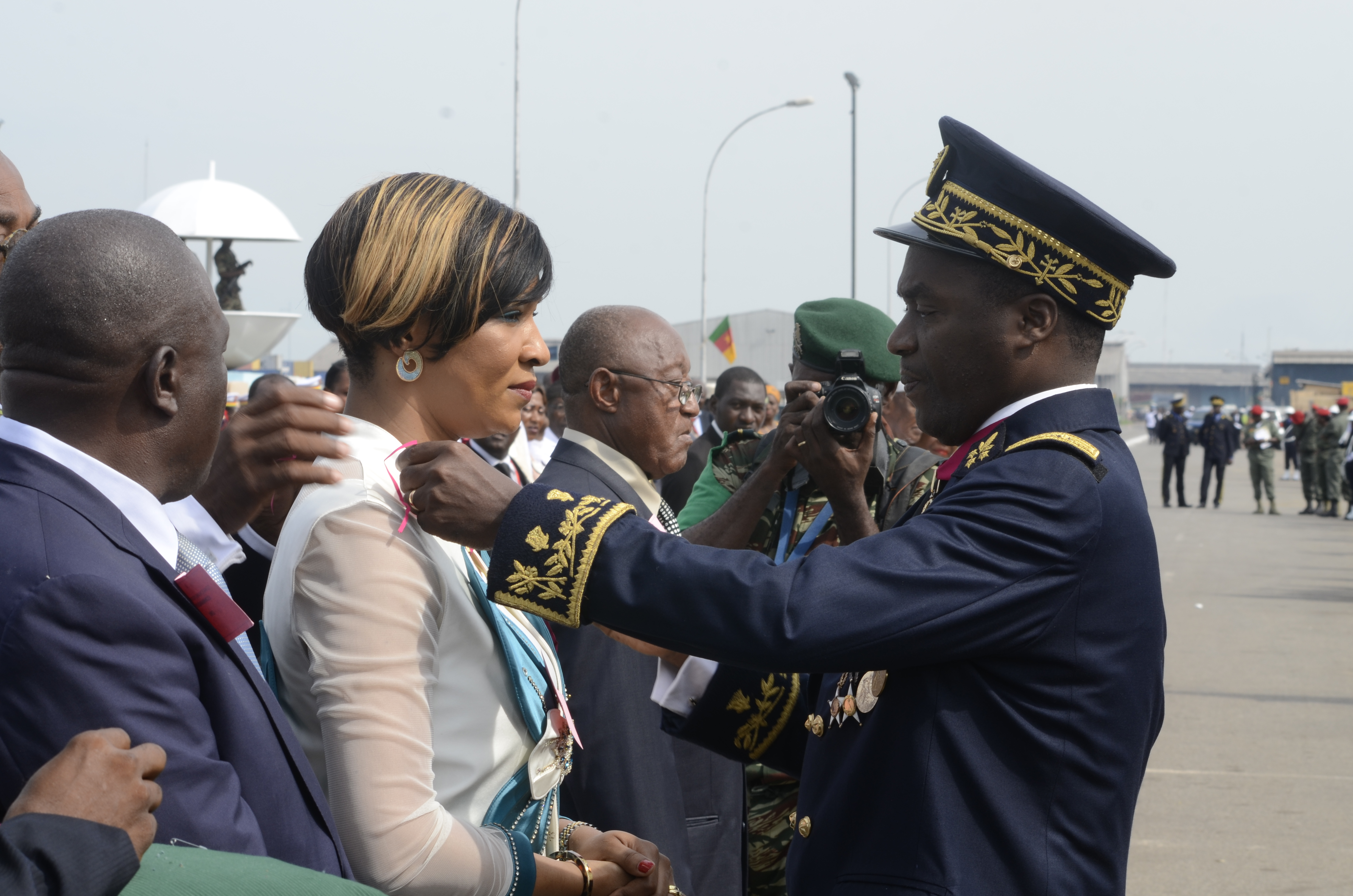
Assomo as Governor of Littoral honoring Leonie Bwemba, consul-general of Malta to Cameroon, in 2012

On 2 October 2015, Assomo was appointed as the Cameroonian Minister of Defense, succeeding Edgar Alain Mebe Ngo'o. Assomo's administration has been accused of human rights abuses during the Anglophone Crisis and during the Boko Haram insurgency affecting northern Cameroon. Jeune Afrique dubbed Assomo as "the enemy of Boko Haram" due to his successes in fighting the group in Far North region. In 2022, Assomo stated that the Cameroonian military was "winning the war" against Boko Haram.
