= Ayos =

- Commune and town
- Location in Cameroon
- Coordinates: 3°54′25″N 12°31′38″E
- Country: Cameroon
- Region: Centre
- Department: Nyong-et-Mfoumou

Population (2005)
  - Total: 22,899
- Time zone: UTC+1 (WAT)

Ayos is a town and commune in the department of Nyong-et-Mfoumou Centre region of Cameroon.

The district is noted for its place in the history of medicine: the 1920s saw the establishment of a medical center managed by the French doctor Eugène Jamot, famed as the person who cured sleeping sickness.

== Geography ==
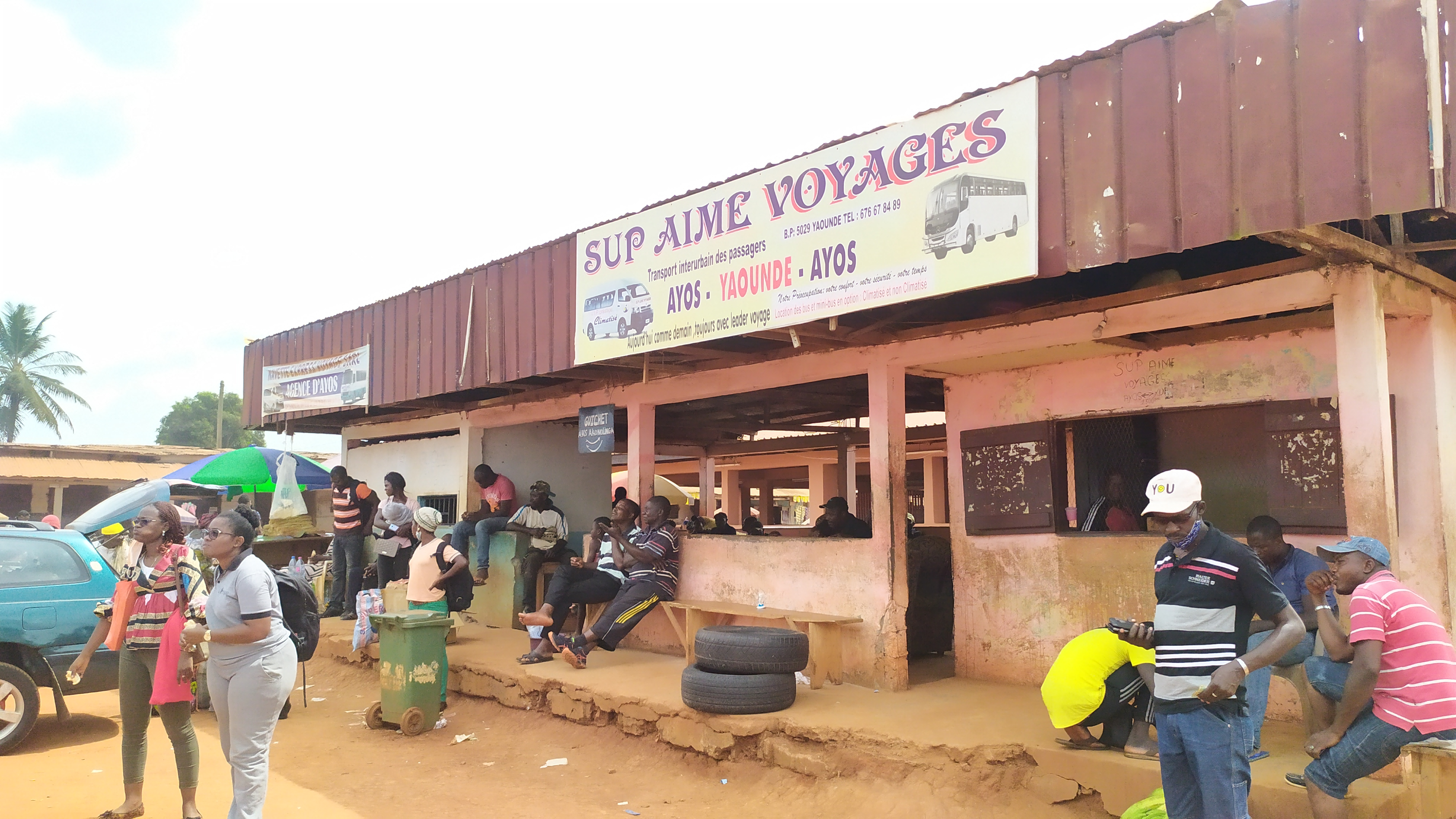
Ayos Bus station

Ayos town, with a population in 2005 of 8653, is located near the right bank of the river Nyong, at the confluence of the Nyong and Long-Mafog. It is crossed by the national Yaoundé-Bertoua road, route N10, 139 km east of the capital Yaoundé, and 42 km north-east of the prefecture Akonolinga.

Ayos town was officially decreed the principal town of its district from 1 February 1924 (with a further decree to the same effect on 7 May 1946, and was raised to the status of a commune in June 1964.

== History ==
From the beginning of the twentieth century, the shores of Haut-Nyong were reported as an epicentre of sleeping sickness: in 1901 a German officer, Captain Von Stein, pointed out for the first time an outbreak of trypanosomiasis east of Atok, on the upper Nyong river. In January 1913, the German doctor Philalethes Kuhn established the first Western medical establishment in Ayos. The 1920s saw new sanitary facilities constituting the logistical and scientific basis for the sleeping sickness control program led by the French military doctor Eugène Jamot, installed in Ayos in 1922, succeeding Dr Jojot. On 8 April 1926, a ministerial decreed established Jamot as the director of a mission to cure sleeping sickness, and at the end of 1926 the Centre d’Instruction d'Ayos was established under the direction of Doctor de Marqueissac. Between 1926 and 1931, the scourge of sleeping sickness was overcome in Cameroon. However, it is then recommended to continue the effort by financial means, sufficient staff and administrative autonomy.

== Organisation ==
Besides Ayos and its districts, the commune includes the following villages:

- Abeng-Nnam
- Aboé
- Adoua
- Akam-Engali
- Asso-Obam
- Atong
- Atout
- Biyem
- By
- Ebeck
- Ekok
- Emini
- Eyes
- Fang-Bikang I
- Fang-Bikang II
- Koba
- Kombo
- Lembe
- Mbaka
- Mbang
- Mebissi
- Mekouma
- Melane
- Meto'o
- Ndéllé
- Ndoro
- Nebodo
- Ngolebomo
- Ngoubi
- Ngoumesseng
- Ngoun
- Nguinda-Minfolo
- Niamvoudou
- Nkolmveng
- Nkoloboudou II
- Nsan
- Nvanga
- Nyabewa
- Obis
- Olembe
- Tomba I
- Wong
- Yebe

== People born in Ayos ==
- Joseph Beti Assomo, politician

== See also ==
- Communes of Cameroon
