= Corruption in Cameroon =

Since independence, corruption in Cameroon has remained prevalent. The pervasiveness of corruption has affected all sectors of the government and civil society, including the executive, judiciary, police, and the private sector. The main causes are a deep lack of political will to fight corruption and neopatrimonialism. Other causes include personal interests and absence of duty conscience, a weakened judiciary with minimal or non-existent opposition in the legislative branch, nepotism and favouritism, and ineffective accountability systems.

Corruption in Cameroon has been called "Cameroon's worst-kept secret" by Thomson Reuters, and Cameroon has had "persistent problems with corruption" according to BBC News. Cameroonians see the police as the most corrupt institution in the government.

The government of Cameroon has taken some steps to address the problem of corruption in the country: in order to increase transparency in its oil sector, Cameroon joined the Extractive Industries Transparency Initiative in late 2013.

Cameroon also witnessed the prosecution of corruption committed by a former prime minister, Ephraim Inoni, who was sentenced to 20 years in prison in 2013 for embezzlement. Several high corruption risk sectors, such as customs and public procurement, create obstacles for doing business in Cameroon.

== Transparency International's CPI ==
Cameroon's Corruption Perceptions Index (CPI) score has been consistently poor throughout the history of Transparency International. According to Transparency International, the perception of public-sector corruption in Cameroon was at its worst in 1998 and 1999 when Cameroon earned the lowest score in the Index.

According to a 2016 Transparency International overview of corruption and efforts to combat it in Cameroon, corruption is encouraged by a weak judiciary, a strong executive, and widespread poverty. Furthermore, transparency of the civil society and freedom of the press are still weak and efforts engaged to combat these have been extensively criticised by national and international actors.

The 2025 Transparency International Corruption Perceptions Index gave Cameroon a score of 26 on a scale from 0 ("highly corrupt") to 100 ("very clean"). When ranked by score, Cameroon ranked 142nd among the 182 countries in the Index, where the country ranked first is perceived to have the most honest public sector. For comparison with regional scores, the best score among sub-Saharan African countries (Note: Angola, Benin, Botswana, Burkina Faso, Burundi, Cameroon, Cape Verde, Central African Republic, Chad, Comoros, Côte d'Ivoire, Democratic Republic of the Congo, Djibouti, Equatorial Guinea, Eritrea, Eswatini, Ethiopia, Gabon, Gambia, Ghana, Guinea, Guinea-Bissau, Kenya, Lesotho, Liberia, Madagascar, Malawi, Mali, Mauritania, Mauritius, Mozambique, Namibia, Niger, Nigeria, Republic of the Congo, Rwanda, Sao Tome and Principe, Senegal, Seychelles, Sierra Leone, Somalia, South Africa, South Sudan, Sudan, Tanzania, Togo, Uganda, Zambia, and Zimbabwe.) was 68, the average was 32 and the worst was 9. For comparison with worldwide scores, the best score was 89 (ranked 1), the average was 42, and the worst was 9 (ranked 181, in a two-way tie).

== Causes ==
=== Neopatrimonialism ===
As previously stated, neopatrimonialism is one of the main causes of corruption in Cameroon. D. Beekers, and B. van Gool (2012) define neopatrimonialism as "a type of regime in which ruling elites use the state for personal enrichment and profit from a public administration that is patently unstable, inefficient, nontransparent, and that fails to distribute public resources to large segments of the population." In a neopatrimonial state, real power and real decision-making lie outside its institutions (Chabal & Daloz, 1999; Bratton & van de Walle, 1997). Here, power is held not by high-ranking government officials, but by those who have connections/clientelist networks that exist inside and/or outside state structures (Cammack, 2007). Office power is used by civil servants who are void of the concept of the superior interest of the nation and instead motivated by personal interests and gains. Furthermore, government officials and members of parliament (MPs) account upwards to the president rather than downwards to the people. In this way, the president can control the local branches and institutions to prevent these local institutions/branches from ‘rebel’ against him. This is done by the central power (the government in general or the president) in a bid to maintain a firm grip on power at all costs, even if it means slowing down policy implementation.

In Cameroon, the central government's fear of losing power to local institutions is showcased by the lethargic ‘implementation’ of the decentralisation law passed in 2004, but actually, the constitution of 1996 already mentioned the creation of a decentralised state. Till today, this law has never been fully implemented and in the meantime, the government has found a way to regain control of local institutions (should this law be fully implemented one day) by creating a position called délégué du gouvernement (Government delegate). Local institutions (the mayor, etc.) will be under this government delegate and will report to him. The government delegate is appointed by the president of the republic and he reports to the central government. In this way, the end product of the 2004 decentralisation law will resemble more the false product of a political devolution than anything else.

=== Tribalism ===
Very close to neopatrimonialism is the patronage system in Cameroon, in which local elections, for example, are done based on particularistic divisions – like ethnicity, religion – in addition to how well the candidate is related to and has access to resources from the central government. In other words, they vote for the candidate who will best provide for them, based on the previously mentioned factors (ethnicity, religion, or both). This puts the population in a position of weakness and silence in the face of corruption. Nevertheless, this patronage system is equally beneficial to the local population because basic government services and access to basic necessities are difficult to obtain. This therefore, privileges the route of corruption when choices are made and naturally deviates from transparent, meritocratic bureaucracies.

=== Other causes ===
Cameroonian academics and political analysts have criticised the pervasive lack of accountability for corruption in Cameroon. This is because government officials report upwards to the president, rather than downwards to the local people. This creates a situation where government officials are free to do what they want without fear of public judgement. Another reason, as coined by Fometeu J. (2001) is that the laws that sanction corruption are not adapted to the corruption environment of Cameroon. Cameroonian laws punish both the corrupter and the corrupted. This way of punishment does not encourage people to denounce corrupt acts and further hinders the evidence of the offence. This is because, firstly, almost all civil servants in Cameroon are corrupt and citizens have to bribe for the most basic government services (Fometeu J., 2001; p. 348). Secondly, in order to obtain evidence of corruption made, the locals have to accept the bribery propositions made by civil servants. With this evidence, if they decide to denounce civil servants, both of them shall be convicted, which is wrong. Only the civil servant should be convicted because he is in a position of power and he is the one who further proposed to be bribed. Fometeu further argues that there is a lack of a conviction system proportional to the severity of the act of corruption committed, the unwillingness of political leaders to submit themselves to scrutiny, that denunciation should be done freely without fear of backlashes, and the judiciary should be totally independent.

Also, there is no strong opposition to condemn corruption acts because opposition leaders always switch sides based on their interests and when they do they condemn embezzlement, they are violently repressed. The police is instrumentalized against any political opposition. In addition to this is the almost non-existence of the opposition party in the National Assembly and Senate in Cameroon. The legislative is basically the ruling party's (CPDM/RDPC) playground.

== Corruption under Paul Biya's administration ==
=== Lack of political will ===
There has been a crucial lack of political will to fight against corruption in Cameroon under Biya's administration. Political will can be defined as "the demonstrated credible intent of political leaders (elected or appointed leaders, civil society watchdogs, stakeholder groups, etc.) to attack the perceived causes of effects of corruption at a systemic level". Political will is crucial in the fight against corruption as it sets the tone, creates the mood and exudes the degree of seriousness that is needed to engage everyone. Political will is equally important in order to punish corruption committed by top government officials who are from the ruling party and it will equally promote a good way of preaching by example. In addition, the fight against corruption is not affected by the availability of economic resources or lack thereof (Avitus A., 2019; pp. 70-71). Therefore, it is safe to say that the lack of political will demonstrated by Biya’s regime is not due to a lack of funds. President Biya himself, after about 4 decades in power has never fulfilled article 66 of the constitution of 1996 by declaring all his property and sources of income. This article 66 demands all government officials to declare their assets and sources of income before assuming a position in government so that it will be possible to measure what they have gained (or lost) during their tenancy. This is a credible means to fight against embezzlement, but Paul Biya has never declared any of his assets, under the helpless gaze of Cameroonians.
President Biya created the CONAC (National Anti-Corruption Commission) in 2006 in order to actively fight corruption (mainly embezzlement). Indeed, the CONAC has done multiple arrests of top government officials in cases of the embezzlement of astronomical amounts of money. The notable ones being Marafa Hamidou Yaya, former Minister of Territorial Administration and Decentralisation, arrested and convicted for having embezzled US$ 29 million in the case named "presidential jet" by local media, and more recently (March 2019), Edgar Alain Mebe Ngo’o, former Minister of Defence arrested on corruption charges with 3 billion FCFA (approx. US$5 million) recovered in cash at his residence, local media reported. These arrests and many others may all seem innocent and driven by Biya's goodwill to fight corruption, but Cameroon political analysts and academics see nothing but deception.

Opération Épervier (Operation Sparrowhawk – name given by local media for the seasonal arrests of high government officials convicted for corruption) is merely a way used by President Biya to eliminate his political opponents or officials from his own political party that he thinks have grown to accumulate too much power throughout their career and are starting to become a threat to him. Taking a closer look, Marafa Hamidou and Edgar Alain Mebe have both been very close to President Biya and have both worked as secretary general to the presidency of Cameroon – a post that keeps you very close to the president. Both of them have held important positions in the government, positions that allow them to forge strategic networks and relations (both national and international) should they decide to run for presidency. President Biya’s strategy is to allow those close to him to embezzle and later on use it against them when he feels they become a threat. This further reinforces the idea that there is no real/genuine will to combat corruption. In addition, it is an opportunity for Biya’s regime to create an illusion of democracy and transparency as it has done in the past, more recently with the blatant use of sham Transparency International observers during the presidential elections of October 2018.

David Wallechinsky ranked President of Cameroon Paul Biya with three others (Robert Mugabe of Zimbabwe, Teodoro Obiang Nguema Mbasogo of Equatorial Guinea, and King Mswati of Eswatini) as the most corrupt dictators in the world. He describes Cameroon's electoral process in these terms: "Every few years, Biya stages an election to justify his continuing reign, but these elections have no credibility.
