= 2017 Equatorial Guinea coup attempt =

Failed overthrow of President Obiang by mercenaries

Location of Equatorial Guinea in Africa

The 2017 Equatoguinean coup attempt was the failed coup d'état in Equatorial Guinea by foreign mercenaries against President Teodoro Obiang Nguema's government. The coup attempt began on 24 December, when foreign mercenaries hailing from the countries of Chad, Sudan, and the Central African Republic (CAR) infiltrated Kye Ossi, Ebibeyin, Mongomo, Bata and Malabo, aiming to attack the president in his presidential palace at Koete Mongomo. State security intercepted the mercenaries in the town of Ebibeyin, resulting in clashes which claimed the life of one of the attackers. Cameroon later reported the arrests of thirty-eight armed fighters along its border with Equatorial Guinea, among them being former Chadian general Mahamat Kodo Bani. The coup attempt was reportedly led by him.

The government promptly capitalized on the purported coup bid to further tighten its grip on power and initiated a crackdown on the country's political opposition, citing the involvement of "certain radical opposition parties" in recruiting the foreign mercenaries. Opposition activist Santiago Ebee Ela died in the custody of the government following his arrest on 2 January, allegedly due to the torture he endured from state security.

Analysts suspect the coup attempt was entirely fabricated by the regime to target political opponents. Two potential motives were suggested: Elites within the country frustrated with the succession plan involving Teodoro's son, or those within the president's camp manufacturing an excuse to deal with the political opposition.

Following the foiled coup attempt, Chad's foreign minister Mahamat Zene Cherif denied any involvement in the coup bid while the dispatched United Nations (UN) envoy to Malabo assured the government of continued support in stabilization efforts.
