= Ministry of Defense (Cameroon) =

Ministry of Defence
- Ministère de la Défense du Cameroun (French)
- Coat of arms of Cameroon

Agency overview
- Jurisdiction: Government of Cameroon
- Minister responsible: Joseph Beti Assomo
- Website: Official website

The Ministry of Defence (French: Ministère de la Défense du Cameroun) is a ministry of the Government of Cameroon. This ministry is responsible for military and defence of the country.

== Ministers of Defence ==
- Jean Baptiste Mabaya, 1960-1961
- Sadou Daoudou, 1961-1982
- Abdoulaye Maikano, 1982-1983
- Gilbert Andze Tsoungui, 1983-1985
- Jérôme Emilien Abondo, 1985-1986
- Michel Meva'a M'Eboutou, 1986-1990
- Edouard Akame Mfoumou, 1990-1996
- Philippe Menye me Mve, 1996-1997
- Amadou Ali, 1997-2001
- Laurent Esso, 2001-2004
- Remy Ze Meka, 2004-2009
- Edgar Alain Mebe Ngo'o, 2009-2015
- Joseph Beti Assomo, 2015-Incumbent

== See also ==
- Cabinet of Cameroon
- Armed Forces of Cameroon
