= Nyong-et-Mfoumou =

- Department
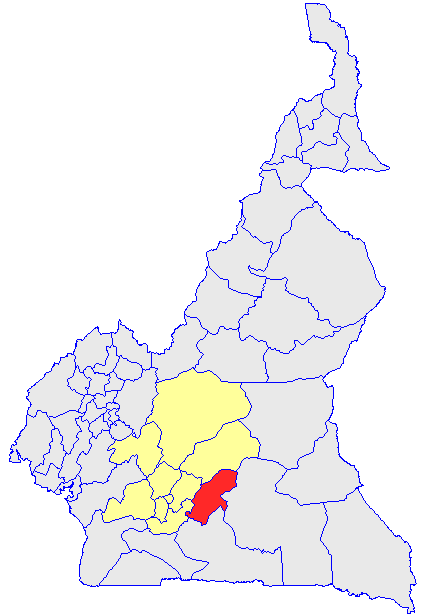
- Department location in Cameroon

- Location within Cameroon Location within Africa
- Country: Cameroon
- Province: Centre Province
- Capital: Akonolinga

Area
  - Total: 2,383 sq mi (6,172 km^{2})

Population (2001)
  - Total: 130,321
- Time zone: UTC+1 (WAT)

Nyong-et-Mfoumou is a department of Centre Province in Cameroon. The department covers an area of 6,172 km^{2} and as of 2001 had a total population of 130,321. The capital of the department lies at Akonolinga.

== Subdivisions ==
The department is divided administratively into five communes and in turn into villages.

=== Communes ===
- Akonolinga
- Ayos
- Endom
- Kobdombo
- Mengang
