= Pardulphus =

Frankish saint and Benedictine abbot

Saint Pardulphus
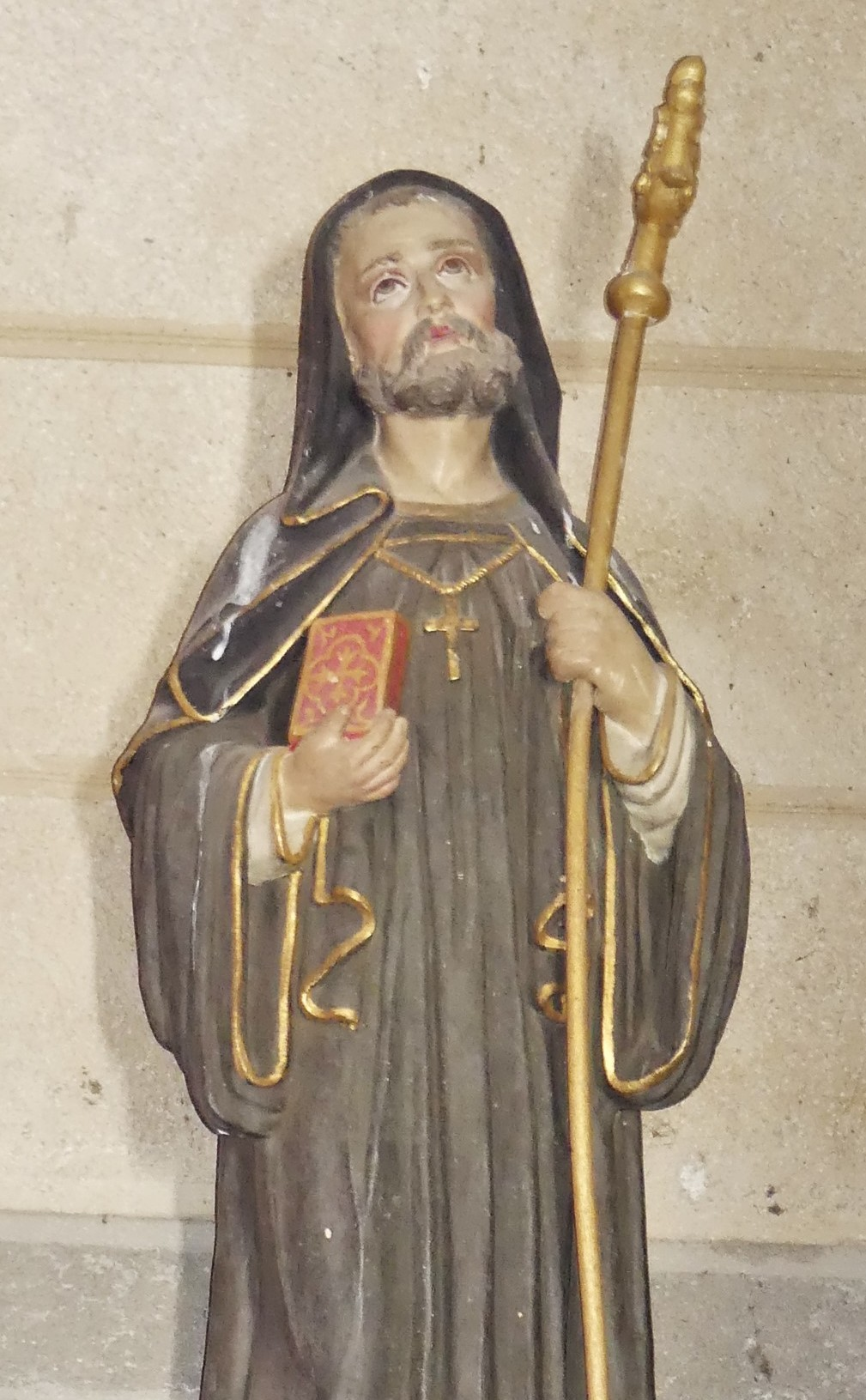
- Born: 657; Sardent, Austrasia (now France)
- Died: ~737
- Venerated in: Roman Catholic Church; Eastern Orthodox Church
- Feast: October 6

Saint Pardulphus (Pardulf, Pardoux) (657 – c. 737 AD) was a Frankish saint and Benedictine abbot. The Vita Pardulfi, was written by an anonymous monk around the middle of the eighth century. It is notable for the insight it provides into life in Aquitaine at the time.

He was born at Sardent, from a family of peasants. His legend states that he was a shepherd who decided to live as a hermit after experiencing a terrible storm. Lantarius, the count of Limoges, had built a monastery at Guéret. Pardulphus joined this monastery, later serving as its abbot. He followed strict penances, never keeping himself warm, and only eating once a week. He is alleged to have rejected heat from any source but the rays of the sun. However, as he grew old he did occasionally make use of “hot stones” to keep himself warm. He rejected the consumption of all poultry, eating only the mushrooms the local peasants brought him.

The Vita Pardulfi records a miracle performed by Pardulphus. Some carpenters were cutting wood with which to build the church of Saint-Aubin at Guéret. After they loaded the wood onto carts and returned to the building works, it was determined that the wood was too short. The carpenters’ superintendent wished to have the carpenters whipped in punishment for this, but Pardulphus intervened with a miracle that made the wood the right size and even surpassed the intended length. As a result, the excess wood was sawn off and hung in the church as an object of veneration.

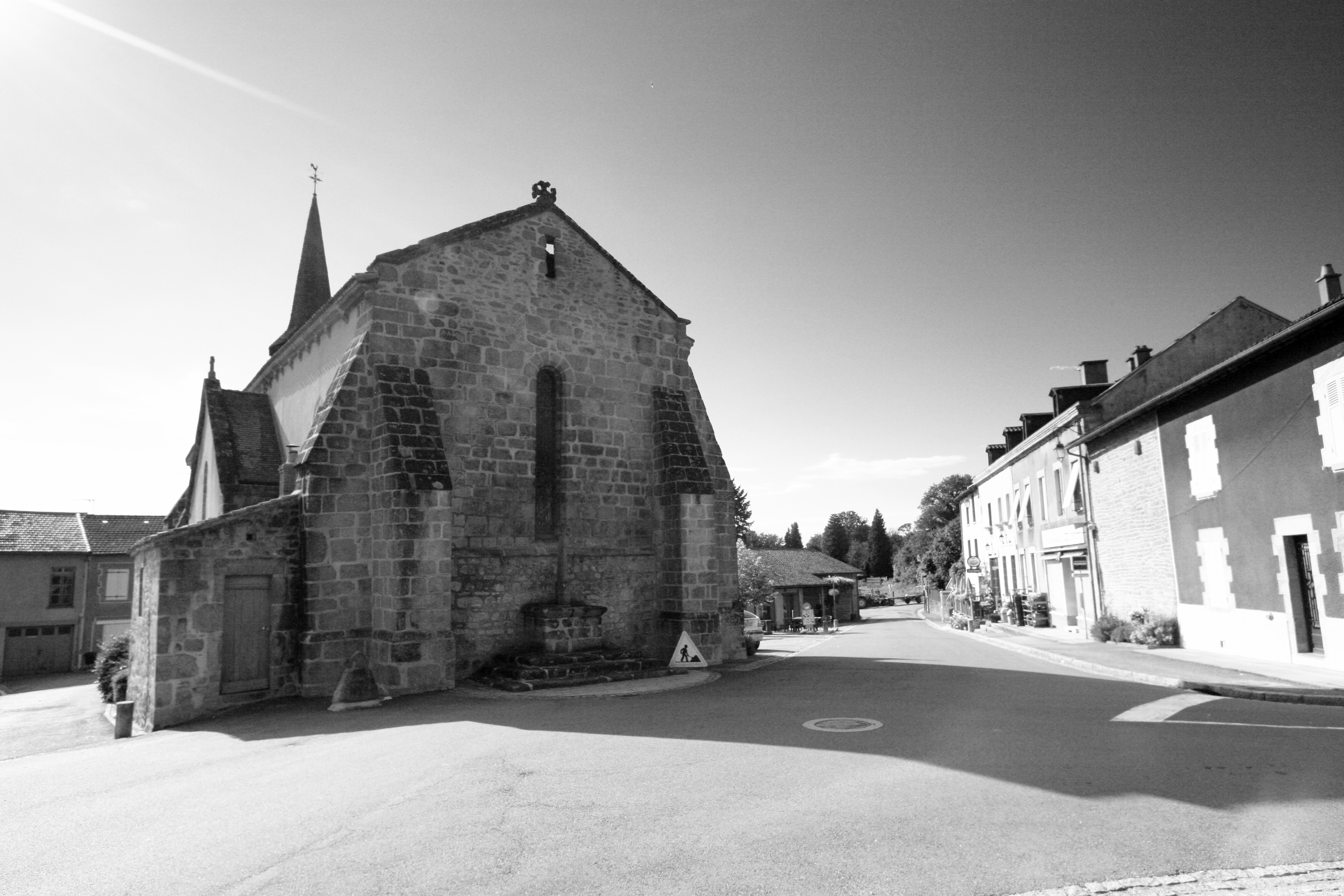
The Church of Saint-Pardoux, Haute-Vienne, is dedicated to Pardulphus.

According to tradition, during the Umayyad invasion of southern France, Pardulphus remained in his monastery. Umayyad forces, retreating after the Battle of Tours, arrived at the monastery. However, his monastery was spared from attack; this was attributed to Pardulphus’ prayers.

== Veneration ==
His feast day is October 6. A reliquary that contained his arm had been preserved at the church of Sardent. However, it is now found at the Museum of Fine Art at Guéret. A number of places in France, such as Saint-Pardoux-de-Drône, take their name from him.

== Vita Pardulfi ==
The Vita Pardulfi Abbatis Waractensis (Medieval Latin for "Life of (Saint) Pardulf of Guéret") is a work on the life of Pardulphus, which was written around the middle of the eighth century. The Vita Pardulfi is notable for the insight it provides into life in Aquitaine during the time of its writing. The work also indicates the high esteem in which Duke Odo of Aquitaine was held, in contrast to the negative picture provided by the Continuations of Fredegar, which were compiled on the instructions of Duke Childebrand, half-brother of Odo's rival Charles Martel.

== Sources ==
- Fouracre, Paul (2000). The Age of Charles Martel. Pearson Education. ISBN 0-582-06476-7
