= Remy Ze Meka =

Cameroonian politician

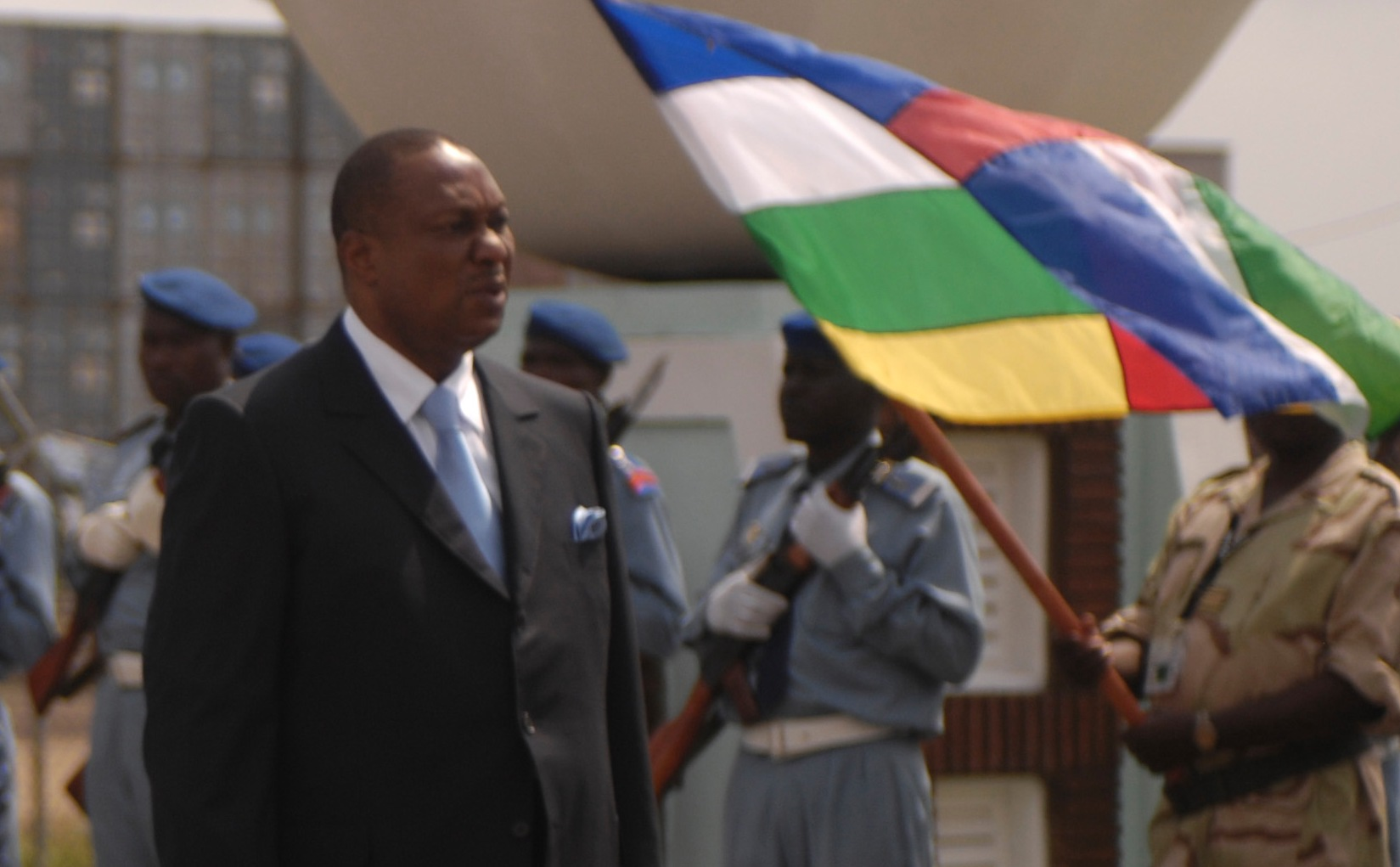
- Meka in Douala in 2006

Minister of Defense
- In office 9 December 2004 – 30 June 2009
- Preceded by: Laurent Esso
- Succeeded by: Edgar Alain Mebe Ngo'o

Director of the Cameroonian National Gendarmerie
- In office 2000 – 9 December 2004

Personal details
- Born: 1952 (age 73–74) Dja-et-Lobo, French Cameroon (now Cameroon)

Remy Ze Meka is a Cameroonian politician who served as the Minister of Defense from 2004 to 2009.

== Biography ==
Meka was born 30 January 1952 in Dja-et-Lobo, and is ethnically Fang. He is a former seminarian with a doctorate in law. Meka served as the director of the Cameroonian National Gendarmerie, and was appointed Minister of Defense on 9 December 2004. Jeune Afrique ranked Meka among the "50 personalities who represent Cameroon" in 2008, as Meka is a staunch loyalist to President Paul Biya. On 30 June 2009, Meka was sacked and replaced by Edgar Alain Mebe Ngo'o. At some point, Meka served as Secretary-General to the Prime Minister's office.

Meka is banned from entering the United States on suspicion of corruption. In 2019, Meka killed three civilians in the remote village of Nkol Metet while speeding and drunk driving. Regional officials held him in jail worried that locals from the villages would lynch him.
