= Stade Municipal (Akonolinga) =

Stadium in Akonolinga, Cameroon

The Stade Municipal is a multi-use stadium in Akonolinga, Cameroon. It is currently used mostly for football matches. It serves as a home ground of FS d'Akonolinga, who are based in the town. The stadium holds 5,000 people.
