= Foudre Sportive d'Akonolinga =

FS d'Akonolinga
- Full name: Foudre Sportive d'Akonolinga
- Ground: Stade Municipal; Akonolinga, Cameroon
- Capacity: 5,000
- Manager: Sandjon Dieudonné
Home colours

Foudre Sportive d'Akonolinga is a Cameroonian football club based in Akonolinga. They are a member of the Cameroonian Football Federation.
