= Visa policy of Cameroon =

Policy on permits required to enter Cameroon

Visitors to Cameroon must obtain an e-Visa unless they come from one of the visa exempt countries.

== Visa policy map ==
Visa policy of Cameroon Cameroon Visa-free eVisa

== Visa exemption ==
Citizens of the following seven countries can visit Cameroon without a visa for up to 90 days:

- Central African Republic
- Chad
- Republic of Congo
- Equatorial Guinea
- Gabon
- Mali^{1}
- Nigeria^{1}

_{1 – Only ordinary passport holders may enter without a visa.}

=== Non-ordinary passports ===
In addition, holders of diplomatic or service category passports issued to nationals of the following countries do not require a visa to enter Cameroon for a stay up to the duration listed below:

90 days within any 6 months

- Italy
- Russia (90/180)
- Turkey

30 days

- China
- United Arab Emirates^{2}
- Vietnam^{2}

_{2 – Only diplomatic passport holders may enter without a visa.}

Date of visa changes
- 3 November 2017: CEMAC – Equatorial Guinea and Gabon

Cancelled:

- 8 September 2015: Mali (was resumed at an unknown date)

Cameroon and South Korea signed a visa exemption for diplomatic and service passports in June 2024 and it is yet to be ratified.

Holders of diplomatic and service passports can obtain a visa on arrival if they have a mission order and a return ticket.

== e-Visa ==
As of October 2026, visitors must obtain transit, short-stay and long-stay visas online before entering Cameroon.

Under normal procedures, the visa is issued within 72 hours of payment of the online fee. It is recommended to apply at least 10 days before the date of entry into Cameroon.

The eVisa is for single or multiple entries, and costs are as follows, based on the duration of stay:

Duration of stay	Fee	Express
180 days	€153	No
1 year	€305	No
180 days	€229	Yes
4-30 days (transit visa)	€153	No

== Transit Visa ==
Transit without visa is allowed for travellers continuing their trip by the same or first connecting plane within 24 hours and without leaving the airport.

Proof of Yellow Fever Vaccination is required for all travelers to Cameroon.

== See also ==
- Visa requirements for Cameroonian citizens
