= Ambam =

- Commune and town
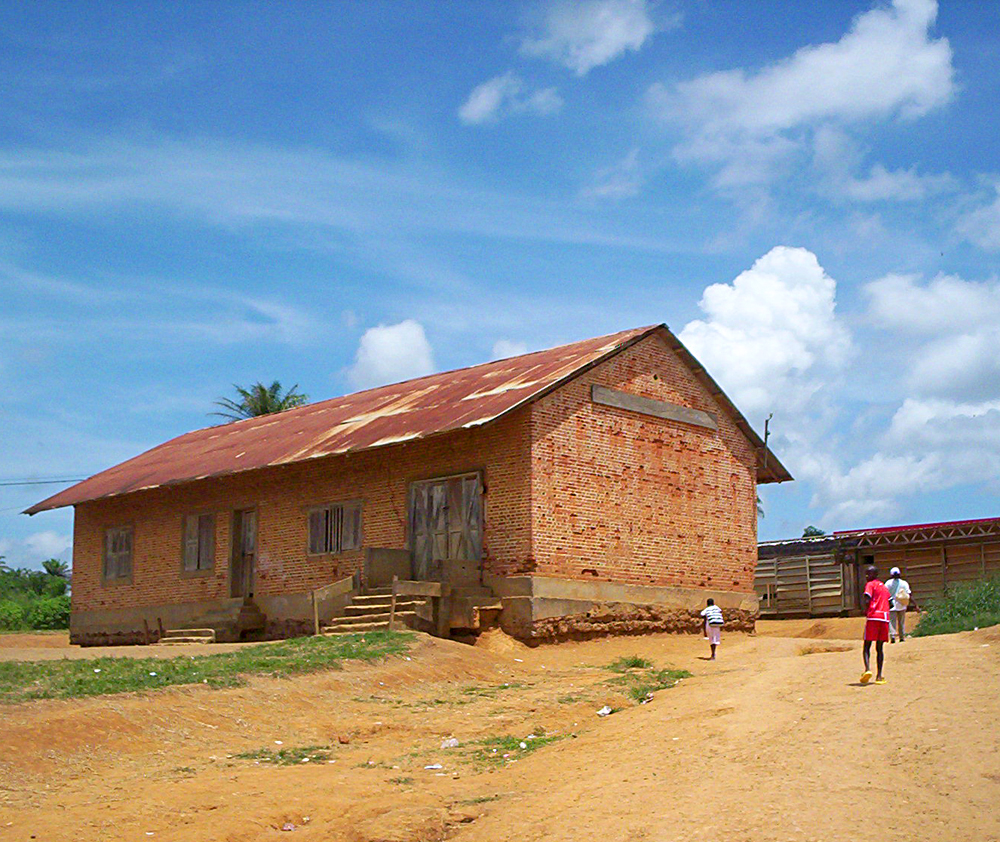
- German building now used as a school in Ambam

- Location in Cameroon
- Coordinates: 2°23′N 11°17′E
- Country: Cameroon
- Region: South Region
- Department: Vallée-du-Ntem

Population (2005)
  - Total: 41,089
- Time zone: UTC+1 (WAT)

Ambam is a town and commune in the Vallée-du-Ntem department, South Province, Cameroon on the border with Equatorial Guinea and Gabon. This frontier town is located approximately 220 km from Yaoundé and as of 2005 had a population of 41,089. Traditionally, it has traded with its neighbouring countries across the border. The Fang are the main ethnic group.

== History ==
This town was once occupied by the Germans under the nation of Kamerun. The Germans built several administrative buildings in Ambam as it was of strategic importance.

On 14 December 2000, the building proposal of a new road connecting Ambam to Eking on the Gabonese border was passed and signed on 2 February 2001. The building of the 27 kilometre road was funded by African Development Foundation (ADF) and the Government of Cameroon and was intended to improve socio-economic infrastructure and to improve the institutional capacities of the Ministries of Public Works (MINTP), Forestry and Wildlife (MINFOF), and Environment and Protection of Nature (MINEP).

In June 2009, a workshop funded by the European Union and the Economic and Monetary Community of Central African States (CEMAC) met in Ambam to discuss the future of the plaintain and the banana industry in the region. In January 2010, the mayor of Ambam, Ela Jolinon Ekoto, was arrested and charged in Ebolowa for the embezzlement of 20 million CFA Francs of communal funds from the town hall.

== Settlements ==
=== Meyo-Centre ===
Meyo-Centre is a village located in the rural commune of Ambam and whose clan is mainly Essambira. It is a crossroads village between Ambam and Ebolowa (capital of the southern province) and is located northwest of the town of Ambam. The N2 highway connects these two towns also from the main town of Ambam.

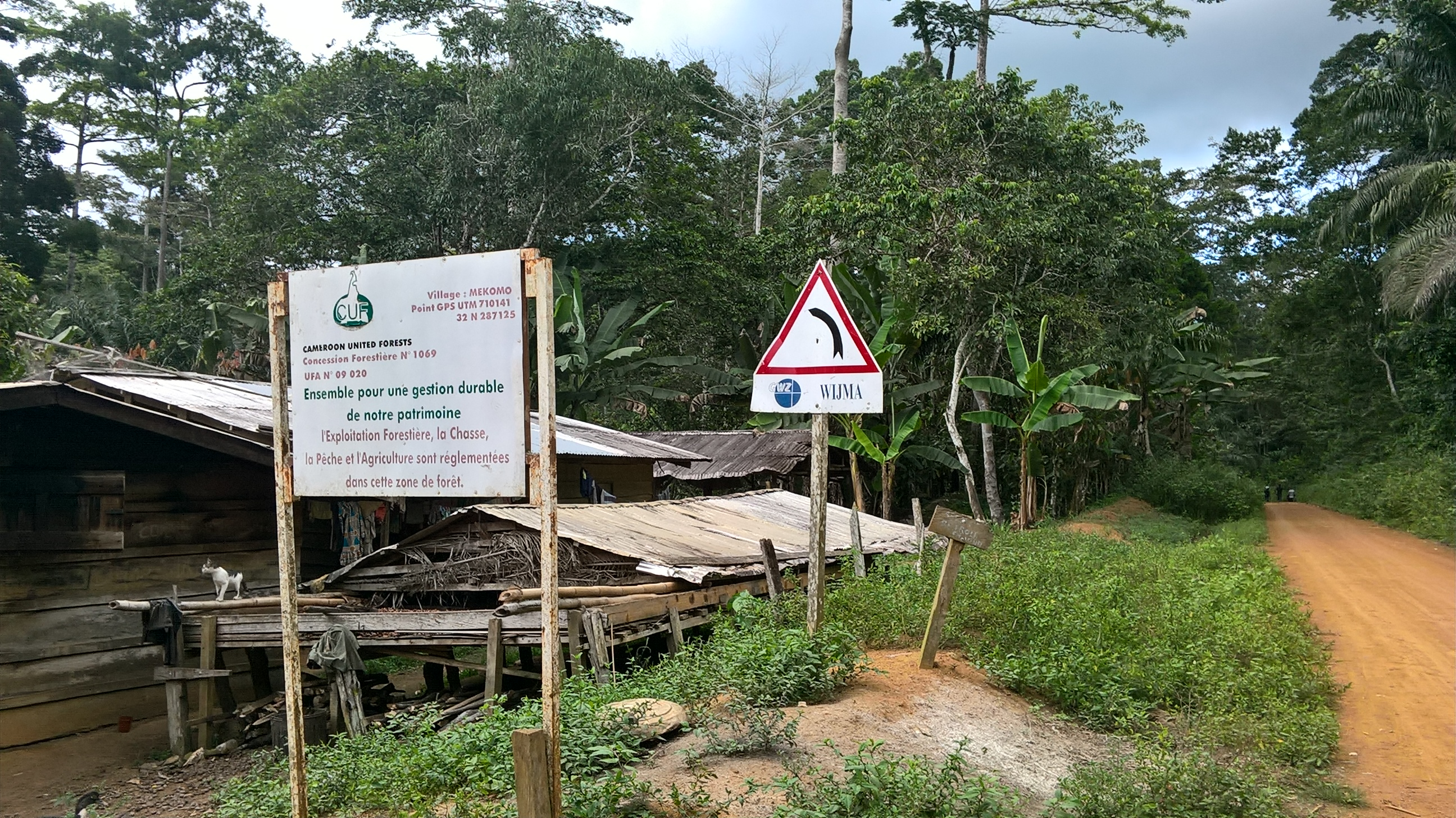
A track crossing a logging area in the village of Mekomo (district of Meyo-Center)

It consists of neighbourhoods, N'nam Okuin, Be Ndang, Efono, Mone N'nam Okuin, Onayong, Bikuan Ete Summer Mengomo and is limited by the northwest Ekoum Doum, Mfenadoum south.

There is a high school, a pharmacy, a clinic, an SAR, a primary school, Post Office and Telecommunications, and a shopping centre.

=== Other ===
Other settlements of note in the commune of Ambam include Ntem, Adjap, Aban-Minkoo and Mendjimi. Ambam has a bus station and is also connected by taxi to the small town of Aban-Minkoo and by road to Ebebiyin on the border with Gabon.

== See also ==
- Communes of Cameroon
