= Ma'an, Cameroon =

Ma'an
- Commune and town
- Interactive map of Ma'an
- Coordinates: 2°22′20″N 10°37′53″E
- Country: Cameroon
- Region: Centre
- Department: Vallée-du-Ntem

Population (2005)
  - Total: 12,448
- Time zone: UTC+1 (WAT)

Ma'an is a town and commune in the Vallée-du-Ntem department, Centre Region of Cameroon. As of 2005 census, it had a population of 12,448.

== See also ==
- Communes of Cameroon
