= Olamze =

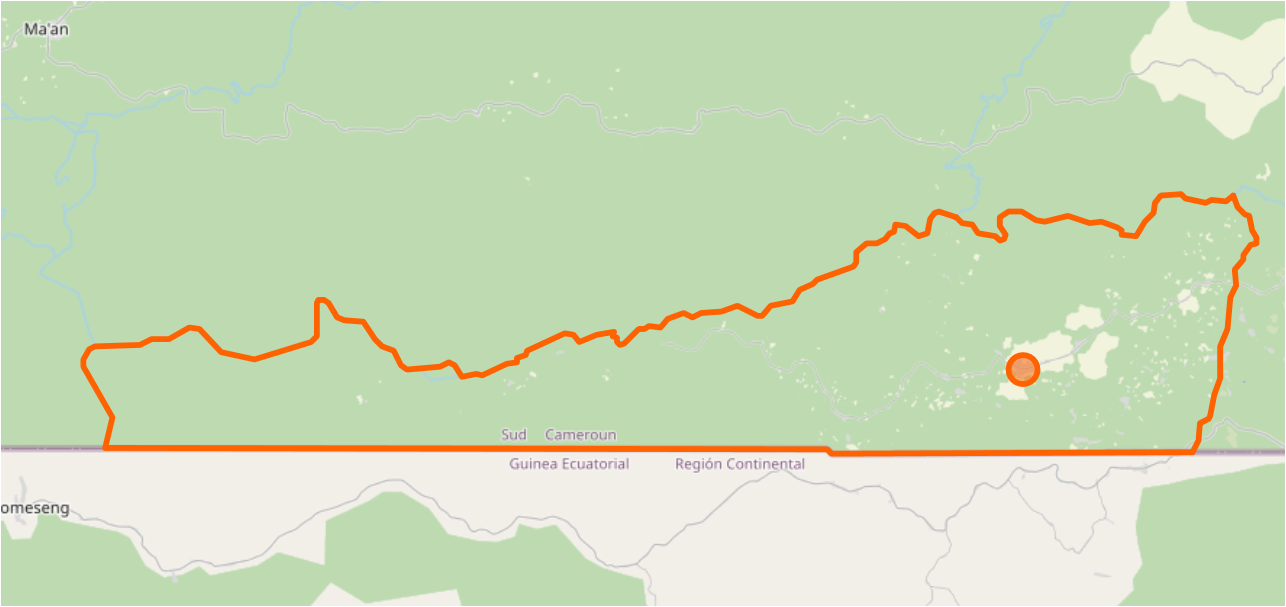
- Map of the commune

- Location in Cameroon
- Coordinates: 2°13′00″N 11°05′00″E
- Country: Cameroon
- Province: South Province
- Department: Vallée-du-Ntem

Government
  - Mayor: Albert Ela Mve (2020)

Population (2005)
  - Total: 8,518
- Time zone: UTC+1 (WAT)

Olamze is a commune in the South Province of Cameroon, located in the department of Vallée-du-Ntem. The commune is on Cameroon's border with Equatorial Guinea. The 2005 census recorded 8,518 inhabitants.

== See also ==
- Communes of Cameroon
