= Eugène Jamot =

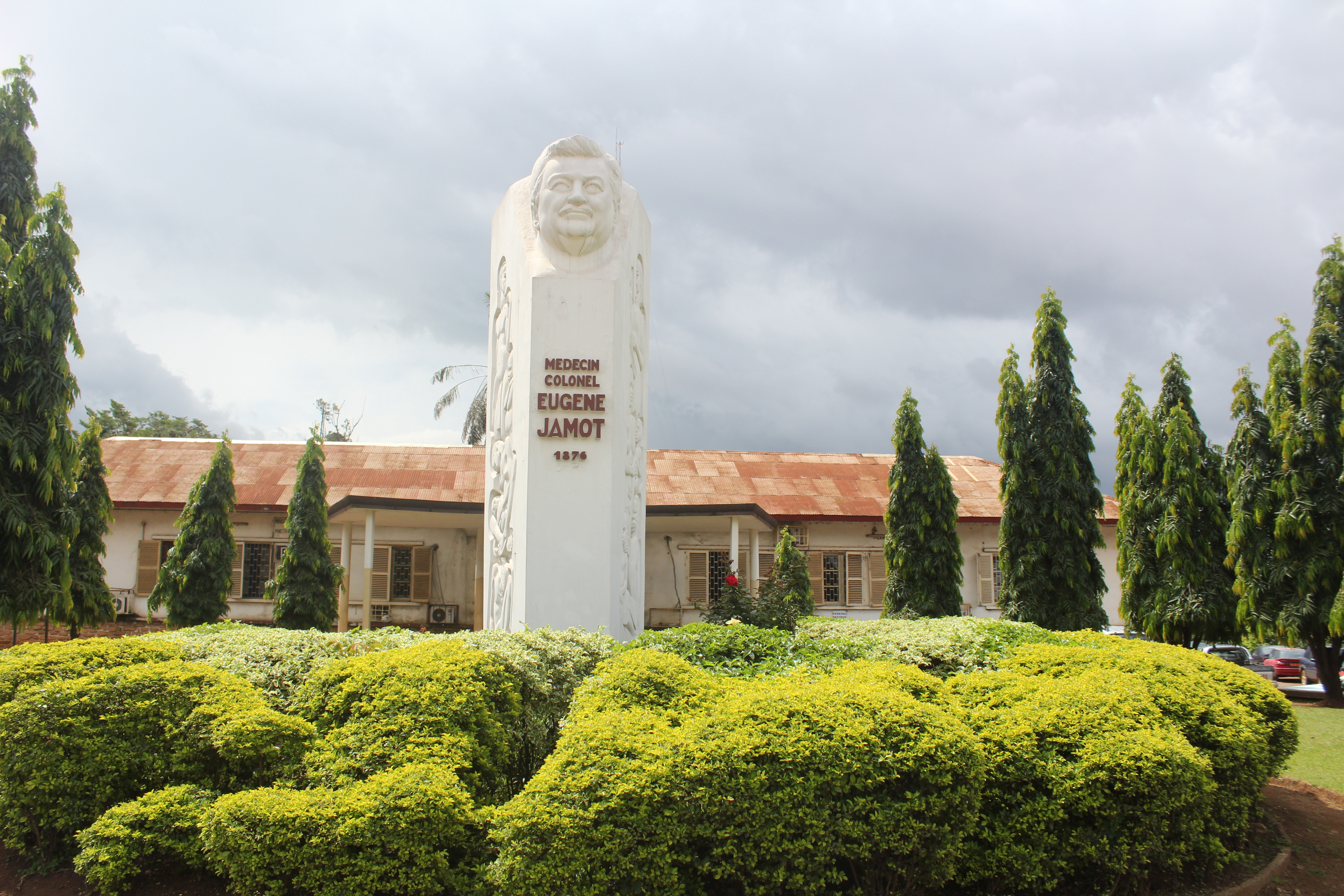
Memorial to Eugène Jamot in Yaoundé, Cameroon

Eugène Jamot (14 November 1879 – 24 April 1937) was a French military doctor in the colonial troops who played a major role in the prevention of sleeping sickness in Cameroon and other central African countries.

Jamot trained as a medical doctor at the University of Montpellier. In 1909, he enrolled at the Marseille School of Tropical Medicine and a year later, in 1910 he went to Cameroon with a French colonial hygiene group. They joined German scientists who had organised a Sleeping Sickness Treatment Research Group. Jamot discovered that the tsetse fly was the vector of the trypanosomes causing the disorder. By sending multiple public health intervention teams in villages, Jamot's team considerably reduced the incidence of trypanosomiasis, and thus, its transmission, in Cameroon and hence the disease.

Later Jamot was made director of the Pasteur Institute at Brazzaville.

== Early life and training ==
Eugène Léon Clovis Jamot was born on 14 November 1879 in La Borie, a hamlet in the commune of Saint-Sulpice-les-Champs, from a modest peasant family. He did his secondary studies at the Collège d' Aubusson, a brilliant student but rowdy and undisciplined, he behaved like a "gang leader" according to his teachers.

He passed his baccalaureate in Clermont in 1898 and enrolled in the Faculty of Sciences of Poitiers where he obtained his license in 1900. To obey the wishes of his father who wanted him to become a teacher, he left for Algeria in 1902 to occupy positions of "repetiteur" (term of the time to designate an assistant professor). His medical vocation was born in Algiers where he enrolled to obtain his Certificat d'études physiques, chimiques et biologiques (certificate of physical, chemical and natural studies, known as PCN)

Back in mainland France in 1903, he taught at the Lycée de Montpellier, while continuing his studies at the Faculty of Medicine of Montpellier. After his marriage and the birth of his first child, he obtained his doctorate in June 1908.

== Career ==
In 1908, Jamot settled as a country doctor in Sardent in his native Creuse, where he practised for two years before giving up for unclear reasons. In 1910, he passed the "lateral" entrance examination (open to civilians) for the School of Application of the Colonial Troops Health Service in Marseille, known as the "École du Pharo". Leaving this high place of training in colonial medicine in 1911, he embarked for Chad as a 2nd class aide-major (doctor second lieutenant) in the Ouadaï battalion where he obtained his first military citation.

Back in mainland France in 1913, he was assigned to the 5th Colonial Infantry Regiment of Cherbourg. He enrolled in courses at the Institut Pasteur in Paris, specialising in parasitosis. At the end of his internship, in 1914, he was appointed deputy director of the Pasteur Institute in Brazzaville, a post he did not immediately occupy because of the First World War.

He embarked for Equatorial Africa in July 1914, but war broke out during the crossing. Jamot was mobilized on August 1, 1914, as head doctor of the Franco-Belgian "Sangha-Cameroon" column among the troops engaged against the German colony of Cameroon. During the capture of Yaoundé in January 1916, Jamot obtained two new military citations.

In Cameroon, Jamot observed the ravages of sleeping sickness among the population. He decided to resume the fight against this disease, initiated by the Germans. In April 1917, he was charged by the Governor-General of the French Equatorial Africa (AEF) with organising the fight against sleeping sickness in Oubangui-Chari. In 1922, he moved to Ayos in Cameroon. He went to Paris in 1925 to present his first work and results, proclaiming "I will awaken the black race". In 1926, by ministerial decree, he became head of the "Permanent Mission for the Prophylaxis of Sleeping Sickness".

In 1931, in view of the results obtained, Jamot, who had become a Doctor-Colonel, was at the height of his glory. He was in Paris for the International Colonial Exhibition. The President of the Republic Alexandre Millerand (1859-1943) presented him as a "benefactor of humanity". He was even proposed for the Nobel Prize according to a "whispered" rumour.

== Late life ==
He died on 24 April 1937, in the village of Sardent, Creuse.
