= Battle of Narbonne =

Battle of Narbonne may refer to:

- Battle of Narbonne (436), between Rome and the Visigoths.
- Battle of Narbonne (531), between the Frankish king Childebert I and the Visigothic king Amalaric.
- Siege of Narbonne (737), between the forces of the Umayyad governor of Narbonne, and a Frankish army led by Charles Martel.
- Siege of Narbonne (752–59), between the forces of the Umayyad governor of Narbonne, and a Frankish army led by Pepin the Short.
- Battle of Narbonne (763), between Francia and Aquitaine.
