= Ngoubi =

- Location in Central African Republic
- Coordinates: 6°31′38″N 21°51′19″E
- Country: Central African Republic
- Prefecture: Haute-Kotto
- Sub-prefecture: Bria
- Commune: Samba-Boungou

Population (December 2016 estimate)
  - Total: 1,100

Ngoubi is a village situated 18 km from the centre of Bria in Haute-Kotto Prefecture, Central African Republic.

== History ==
UPC stormed Ngoubi on 30 November 2016 and looted civilians' properties, causing the residents to seek refuge in the school or in Bria. A clash between two armed militias occurred in Ngoubi on 30 December 2016, causing one death.

Joint FPRC-UPC forces attacked Ngoubi on 29 November 2017, torching down several houses and health post. FPRC took down one of its barriers in the village on 15 June 2019 as an implementation of the peace agreement.

== Education ==
There is a school in Ngoubi.

== Healthcare ==
Ngoubi has one health post.
