= Kobdombo =

Coordinates: 4.1000°N 12.5000°E

- Commune and town
- Interactive map of Kobdombo
- Country: Cameroon
- Time zone: UTC+1 (WAT)

Kobdombo is a town and commune in Cameroon.

== See also ==
- Communes of Cameroon
