= Cameroonian passport =

Passport issued to citizens of Cameroon

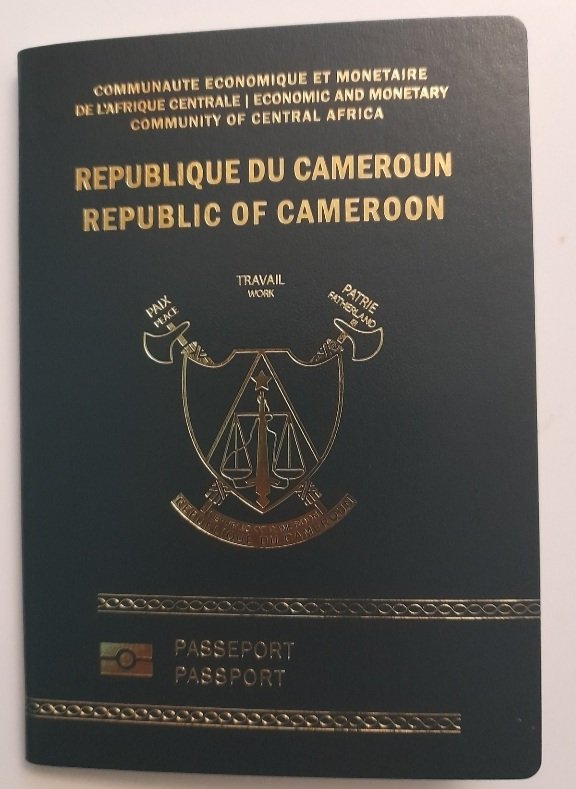
- Front cover of the current Cameroonian passport (with chip)
- Type: Passport
- Issued by: Cameroon
- First issued: 1 October 2013 (biometric version)
- Purpose: Identification
- Eligibility: Cameroonian citizenship

The Cameroonian passport is issued to citizens of Cameroon for international travel.

As a member of the Central African Monetary Zone, Cameroonian passports are engraved with a CEMAC symbol on the cover page. Holders of Cameroonian passports can travel to other CEMAC countries without any visa.

As of 1 January 2017, Cameroonian citizens had visa-free or visa on arrival access to 45 countries and territories, ranking the Cameroonian passport 90th in terms of travel freedom (tied with Angolan and Vietnamese passports) according to the Henley visa restrictions index.

== See also ==
- List of passports
- Visa requirements for Cameroonian citizens
