= Edouard Akame Mfoumou =

Édouard Akame Mfoumou
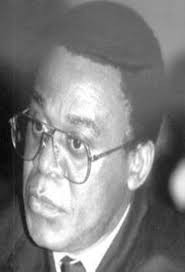
- Akame Mfoumou in 2015

Minister of State for Economy and Finance
- In office 19 September 1996 – 27 April 2001

Minister of Defence
- In office 7 September 1990 – 1996

Secretary-General of the Presidency
- In office 13 April 1989 – 7 September 1990

Chairman of the Board of Camair-Co
- Incumbent
- Assumed office 11 September 2013

Personal details
- Born: August 14, 1945 Ndonkol, South Region, Cameroon
- Occupation: Civil servant, politician, administrator

Edouard Akame Mfoumou (born 14 August 1945) is a Cameroonian politician and former senior government official who has held multiple high-level posts, including Minister of Defence, Minister of Economy and Finance, Secretary-General of the Presidency, and later Chairman of the Board of the national airline company.

== Early life and education ==
Born in the South region of Cameroon, Akame Mfoumou completed his primary education at the Mission Catholique of Nkol-Ekong. Known affectionately as "Le Vieux," He attended the Catholic mission school of Nkol-Ekong from 1952 to 1958, where he earned his primary education certificate. He continued secondary studies at the Petit Seminar of Bonépoupa and later at Libermann high school in Douala, completing his baccalaureate in philosophy in 1965.

== Administrative career ==
After graduating from ENAM, Akame Mfoumou joined the Ministry of Territorial Administration in 1972 as Head of the Administrative Organization Service. In 1975 he was appointed Attached to the Prime Minister’s cabinet, and in 1976 he became Director of Legislative, Regulatory, Social and Cultural Affairs.

He was promoted in September 1981 to Deputy Secretary-General of the Prime Minister’s Services, and in May 1984 became Technical Adviser at the General Secretariat of the Presidency of the Republic.

From 1984 to 1989, he served as Director-General of the Banque internationale du Cameroun pour l'épargne et le crédit (BICIC), which later became BICEC.

== Secretary-General of the Presidency (1989–1990) ==
On 13 April 1989, by presidential decree, Akame Mfoumou was appointed Secretary-General of the Presidency. In this role he coordinated interministerial policy and served as a key adviser during the transition toward political liberalization in the early 1990s.

== Minister of Defence (1990–1996) ==
Akame Mfoumou became Minister of Defence on 7 September 1990, at a time marked by political pluralism, security tensions, and restructuring of the armed forces. His tenure included administrative reforms, reinforcement of military infrastructure, and modernization projects initiated under President Paul Biya.

== Minister of State for Economy and Finance (1996–2001) ==
From September 1996 to April 2001, he served as Minister of State in charge of Economy and Finance. His period in office was marked by structural adjustment reforms, negotiations with the IMF and World Bank, and preparation for Cameroon’s entry into the Heavily Indebted Poor Countries (HIPC/PPTE) Initiative.

In 2000, Cameroon reached the HIPC “decision point”, unlocking major debt-relief measures. Under his leadership, the country also completed its sixth IMF program before he stepped down from his governmental role in 2001.

== Post-Ministerial Activities ==
=== Camair-Co (from 2013) ===
On 11 September 2013, Akame Mfoumou was appointed Chairman of the Board of Camair-Co by presidential decree. Shortly after, the board initiated leadership changes within the company, including the dismissal of the Director-General.
