= Mengang =

Coordinates: 3.8833°N 12.0500°E

- Commune and town
- Interactive map of Mengang
- Country: Cameroon
- Time zone: UTC+1 (WAT)

Mengang is a town and commune in Cameroon.

== See also ==
- Communes of Cameroon
