= Vallée-du-Ntem =

Coordinates: 2°22′N 11°16′E

- Department
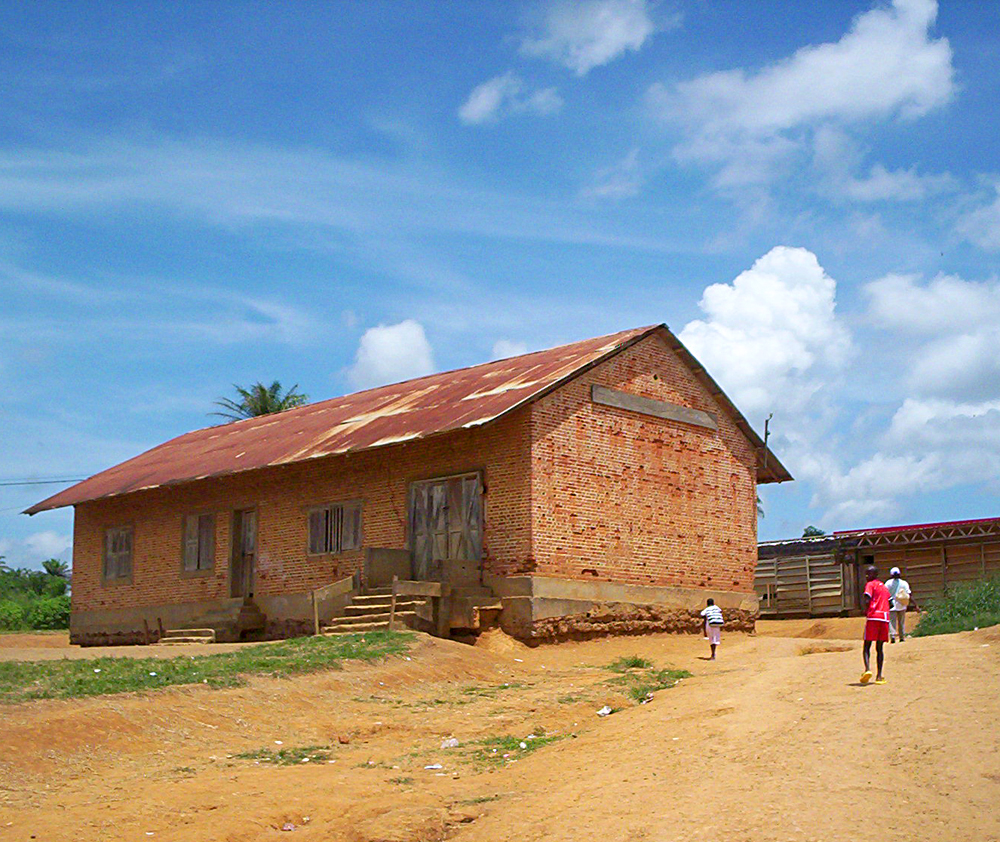

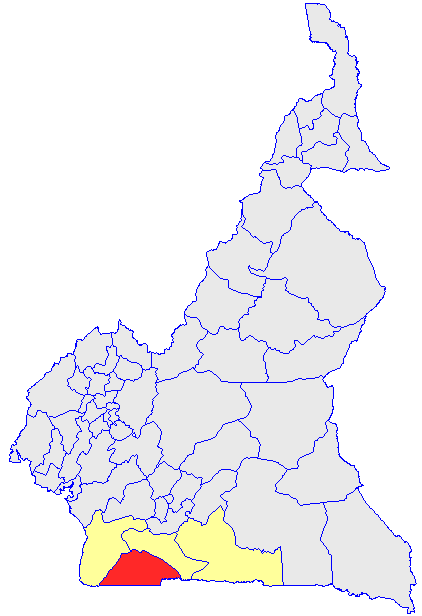
- Department location in Cameroon
- Country: Cameroon
- Province: South Province
- Capital: Ambam

Area
  - Total: 7,303 km^{2} (2,820 sq mi)

Population (2005)
  - Total: 79,182
  - Density: 10.84/km^{2} (28.08/sq mi)
- Time zone: UTC+1 (WAT)

Vallée-du-Ntem is a department of South Province in Cameroon. The department covers an area of 7,303 km^{2} and as of 2005 had a total population of 79,182. The capital of the department lies at Ambam.

== Subdivisions ==
The department is divided administratively into 4 communes / arrondissements, and in turn into villages.

=== Communes / Arrondissements ===
- Ambam
- Ma'an
- Olamze
- Kyé-Ossi
