= Sardent =

Commune in Nouvelle-Aquitaine, France

- Commune
- Coat of arms
- Location of Sardent
- Location within France Location within Nouvelle-Aquitaine
- Coordinates: 46°03′05″N 1°51′23″E
- Country: France
- Region: Nouvelle-Aquitaine
- Department: Creuse
- Arrondissement: Guéret
- Canton: Ahun
- Intercommunality: CC Creuse Sud Ouest

Government
  - Mayor (2020–2026): Thierry Gaillard
- Area^{1}: 41.11 km^{2} (15.87 sq mi)
- Elevation: 513 m (1,683 ft)
- Highest elevation: 680 m (2,230 ft)
- Lowest elevation: 455 m (1,493 ft)
- Population (2023): 760
  - Density: 18/km^{2} (48/sq mi)
- Time zone: UTC+01:00 (CET)
  - Summer (DST): UTC+02:00 (CEST)
- INSEE/Postal code: 23168 /23250
- ^{1} French Land Register data, which excludes lakes, ponds, glaciers > 1 km^{2} (0.386 sq mi or 247 acres) and river estuaries.

Sardent (French pronunciation: [saʁdɑ̃]; Limousin: Sarden) is a commune in the Creuse department in the Nouvelle-Aquitaine region in central France.

== Geography ==
An area of streams, lakes, forestry and farming, comprising the village and several hamlets situated in the valley of the river Gartempe, some 10 miles (16 km) south of Guéret, where the D60 and the D50 roads join the D940.

== Population ==
Historical population
Year	Pop.	±% p.a.
1968	1,085	—
1975	1,047	−0.51%
1982	944	−1.47%
1990	845	−1.38%
1999	801	−0.59%
2007	834	+0.51%
2012	771	−1.56%
2017	788	+0.44%
2023	760	−0.60%
Source: INSEE

== Sights ==
- The church, dating from the eleventh century.
- Megaliths known as "Les Pierres Boutelines".
- A nineteenth-century chapel at the hamlet of Saint-Pardoux.
- A statue of the "marmot de la Feyte", at La Feyte.
- Sculptures at the village of Mont.

== Personalities ==
- Claude Chabrol, (1930-2010), a native of Sardent, shot his first film Le Beau Serge in Sardent
- Eugene Jamot, (1879-1937), doctor of tropical medicine, was born here.

== See also ==
- Communes of the Creuse department
