= Kyé-Ossi =

Kye Ossi
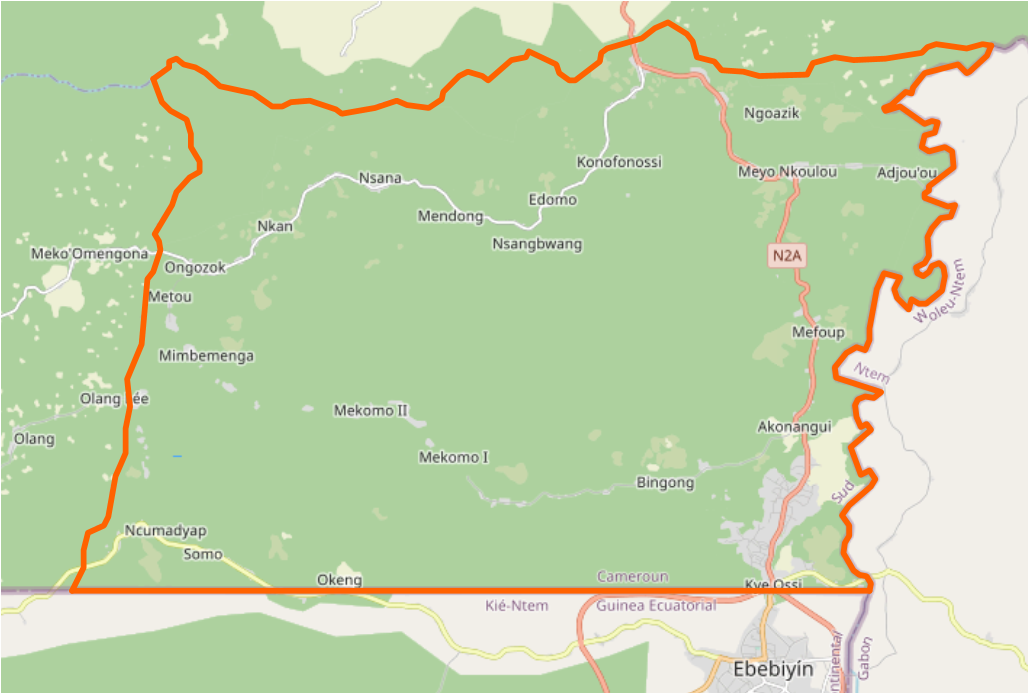
- Map of the commune

- Location in Cameroon
- Coordinates: 2°10′31″N 11°20′27″E
- Country: Cameroon
- Province: South Province
- Department: Vallée-du-Ntem

Government
  - Mayor: Jean Marie Zue Zue

Population (2005)
  - Total: 17,127
- Time zone: UTC+1 (WAT)

Kyé-Ossi is a commune in the South Province of Cameroon, located in the department of Vallée-du-Ntem. The commune is located immediately on Cameroon's borders with Gabon and Equatorial Guinea.

== Population ==
The 2005 census recorded 17,127 inhabitants.
