= Akonolinga =

- Commune and town
- Location in Cameroon
- Coordinates: 3°46′N 12°15′E
- Country: Cameroon
- Region: Centre
- Department: Nyong-et-Mfoumou
- Elevation: 520 m (1,710 ft)

Population (2005)
  - Total: 47,561

Akonolinga is a town and commune in the Nyong-et-Mfoumou department, Centre Region of Cameroon. As of 2005 census, it had a population of 47,561.

It lies on the Nyong River, due east of the capital Yaoundé. The town is home to FS d'Akonolinga football club, of the Cameroon Premiere Division.

== Gallery ==
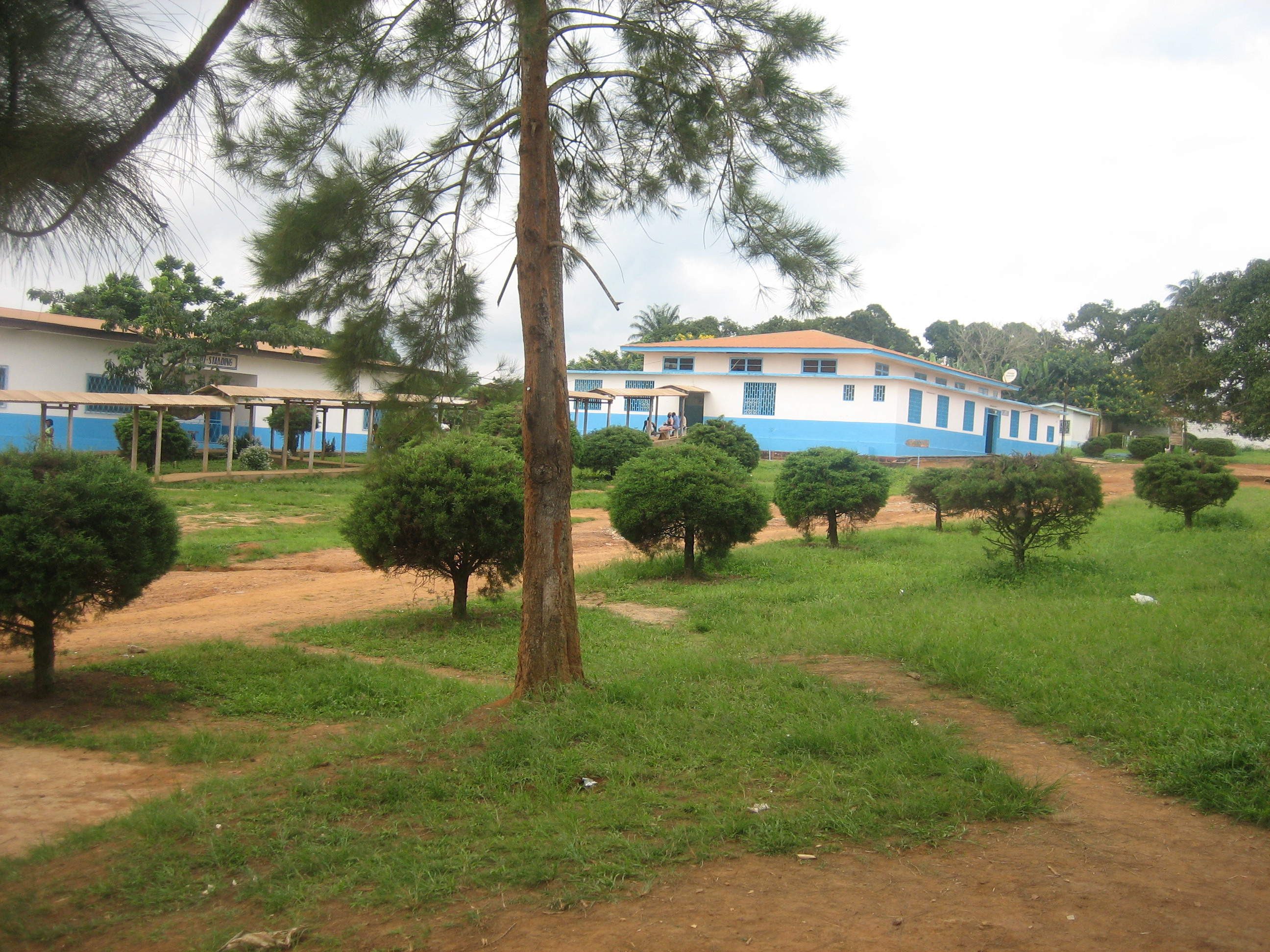
District hospital

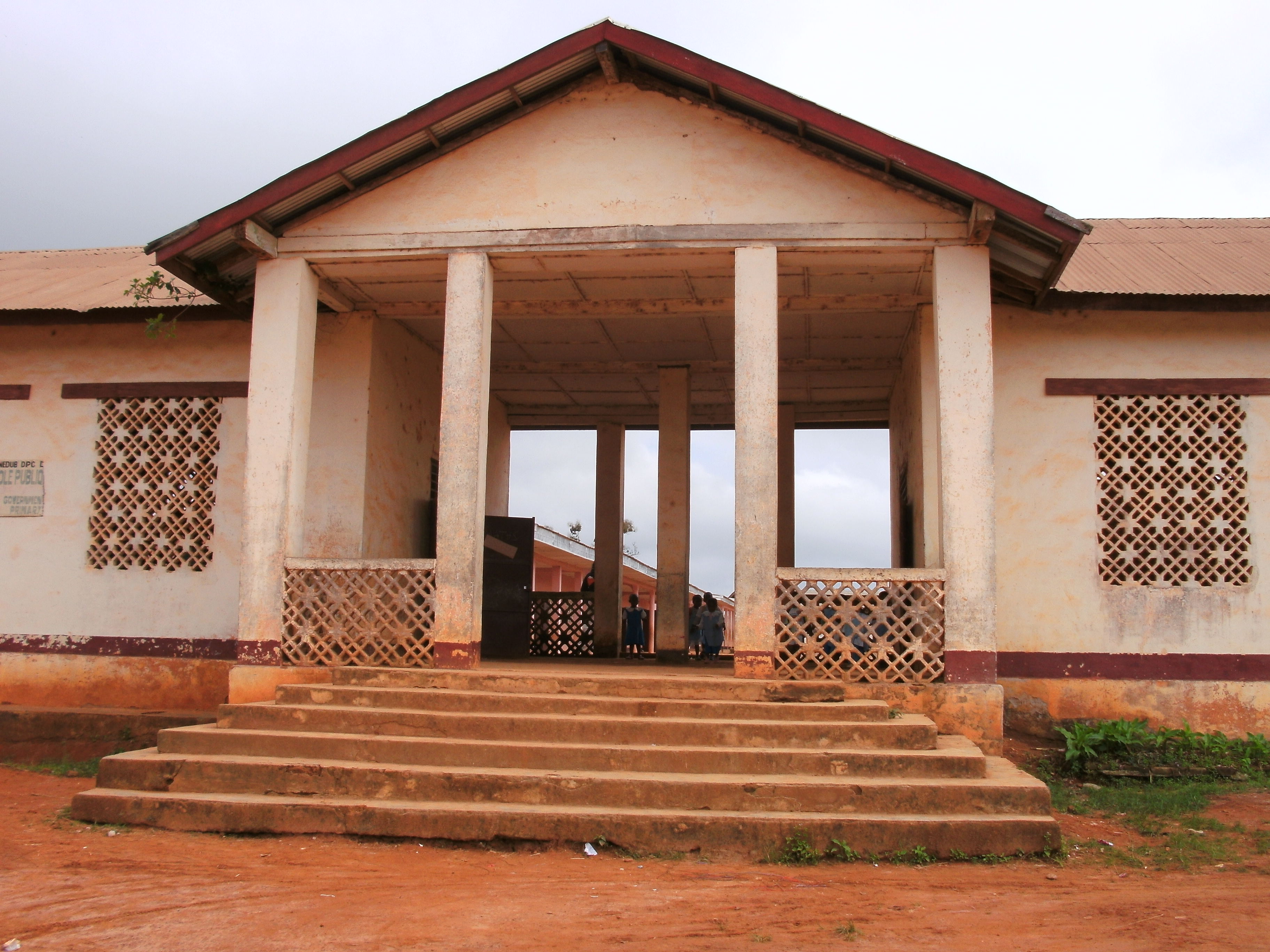
Primary school
