= Edgar Alain Mebe Ngo'o =

Cameroonian politician

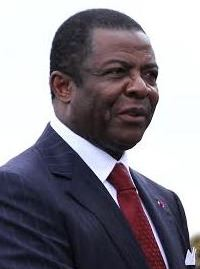

Former Minister of Transport, Former Minister of Defence, Former Delegate General of National Security, Former Director of Civil Cabinet of Presidency
- Incumbent
- Assumed office 2015

Personal details
- Born: Mebe Ngo'o Edgar Alain; January 22, 1957 (age 69) Sangmélima, Cameroon, Africa
- Occupation: Politician

Edgar Alain Mebe Ngo'o (born 22 January 1957) is a Cameroonian politician who has occupied multiple positions in the government of Cameroon and has served in the government of Cameroon as Minister of Transport from 2015 to 2017. An important security official, he was Delegate-General for National Security (head of the national police) from 2004 to 2009 and Minister-Delegate at the Presidency for Defense (defense minister) from 2009 to 2015.

== Early life and education ==
Edgar Alain Mebe Ngo'o was born on 22 January 1957 in Sangmélima, Cameroon. He studied Economics at the University of Yaoundé and graduated in 1982. He later attended the National School of Administration and Magistracy (ENAM), where he trained as a civil administrator and graduated in 1985.

== Political career ==
Mebe Ngo'o was born in Sangmélima. He was Economic Affairs Adviser to the Governor of East Province from 1985 to 1988 and Secretary-General of North Province from 1988 to 1991. Subsequently, he was Prefect of Ocean Department from 1991 to 1995, Prefect of Mefou and Afamba Department from 1995 to 1996, and Prefect of Mfoundi Department from 1996 to 1997.

On 7 December 1997, Mebe Ngo'o was appointed as Director of the Civil Cabinet of the Presidency; after seven years in that position, he was instead appointed as Delegate-General for National Security on 8 December 2004. As Delegate-General for National Security, Mebe Ngo'o was credited with cracking down on police abuses and reviving the "police of the police", a unit intended to investigate abuses, in 2005; he also publicly acknowledged corruption in the police force, including the use of torture and extortion.

After four and a half years as head of the national police, Biya moved Mebe Ngo'o to the post of Minister-Delegate at the Presidency for Defense on 30 June 2009. Mebe Ngo'o was retained in his post in the government named on 9 December 2011, in the wake of Biya's re-election for another term. That Biya chose to keep Mebe Ngo'o in his post was viewed as surprising by some, given that the latter had been the target of corruption allegations.

In May 2014, in the wake of the Chibok schoolgirl kidnapping, "defense minister Edgard Allain Mebe Ngo'o met with Chad's minister of national defense, Benaindo Tatola, in Yaounde. Ngo'o said Chad had also deployed troops to work together with Cameroonian forces on the borders with Nigeria. He also said troops from the two countries will cross into Nigeria and fight Boko Haram in collaboration with Nigerian forces."

He was moved to the post of Minister of Transport on 2 October 2015 until 2 March 2018. On the 12th of March 2019, his residence was searched by the police and he was arrested and now waiting to be judged by the criminal special court. He is currently in the Kondengui prison.

In January 2023, he was sentenced to thirty years in prison for embezzlement of public funds.
