= Ewondo =

Ewondo may refer to:

- The Ewondo, one of the Beti-Pahuin peoples of Cameroon
- The Ewondo language, the language of these people
- Ewondo Populaire, a Beti-based pidgin of Cameroon, spoken in the area of the capital Yaoundé
