= Nkolmetet =

Coordinates: 3°26′N 11°46′E

- Commune
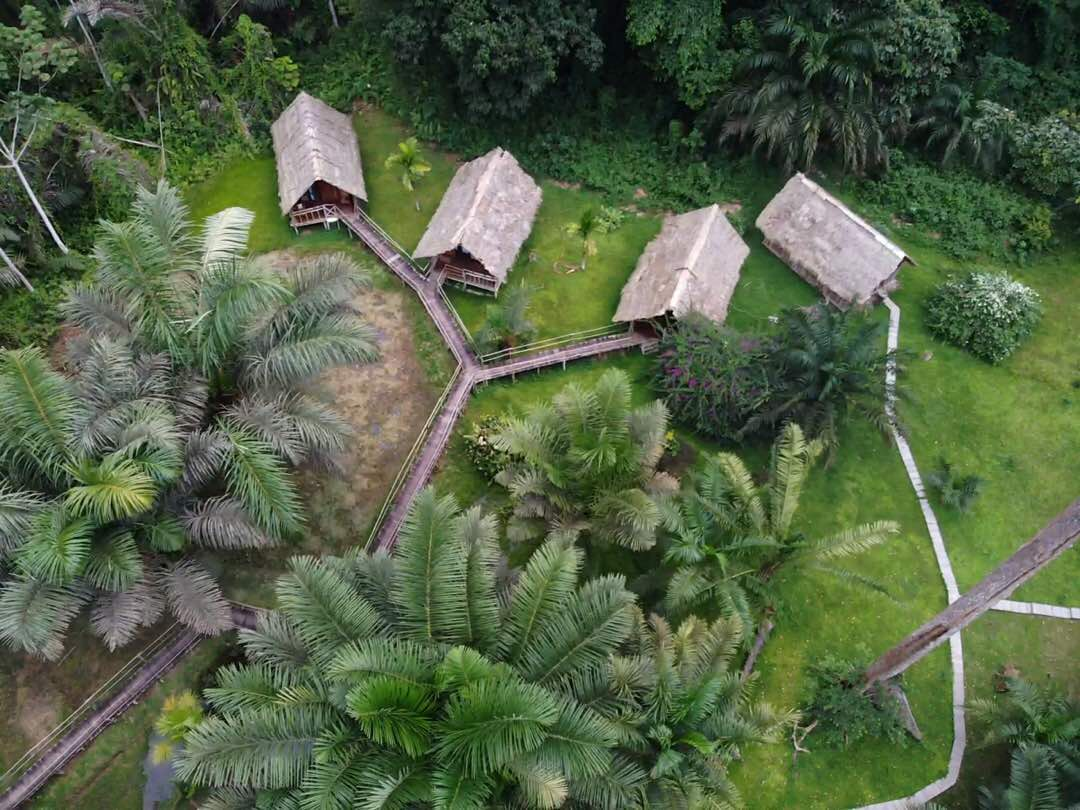
- Huts
- Interactive map of Nkolmetet
- Country: Cameroon
- Time zone: UTC+1 (WAT)

Nkolmetet is the name of one of the villages of the Beti tribe in the Nyong ang So'o division, in the center province of Cameroon.

Nkolmetet is a combined word of two different Beti words Nkol which means hill and the word Metet which is a kind of edible plant also called in Beti yolyolo. Because of it bitterness, the plant is commonly called in Cameroon Ndole of Ewondo and Duala language; also known as bitterleaf (Vernonia amygdalina).

Today the village is a district en voie to be a subdivision.

== Gallery ==
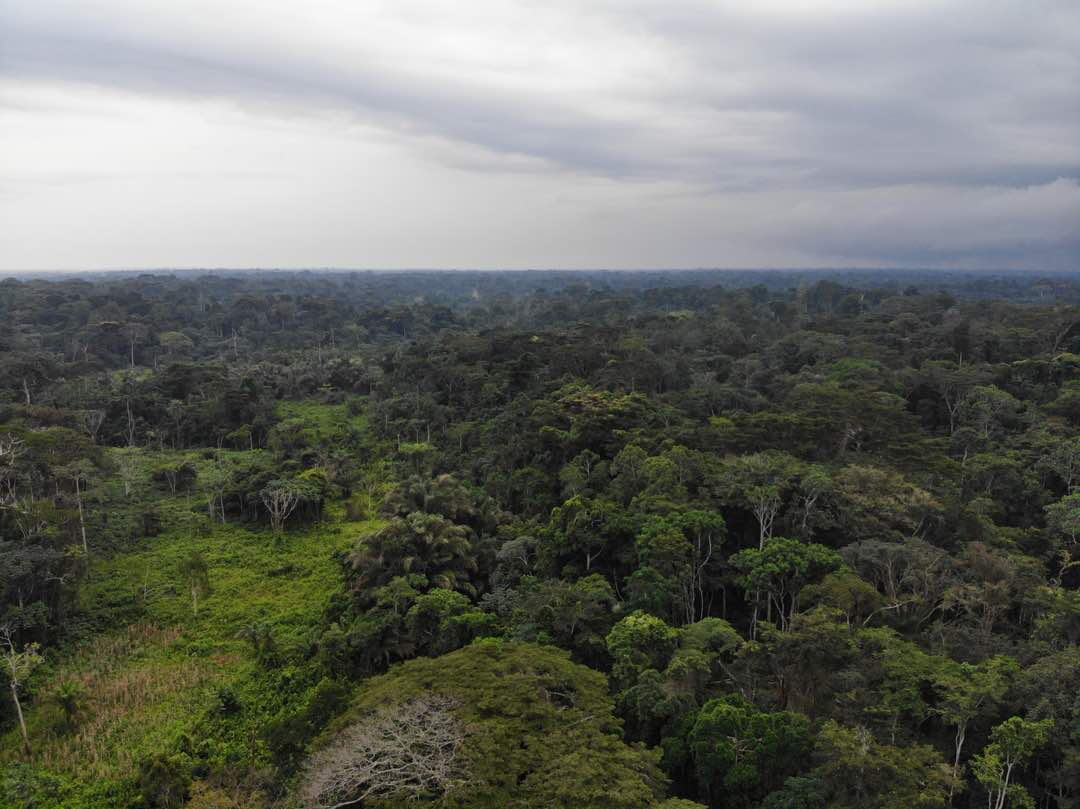
Oveng Forest at Nkolmetet

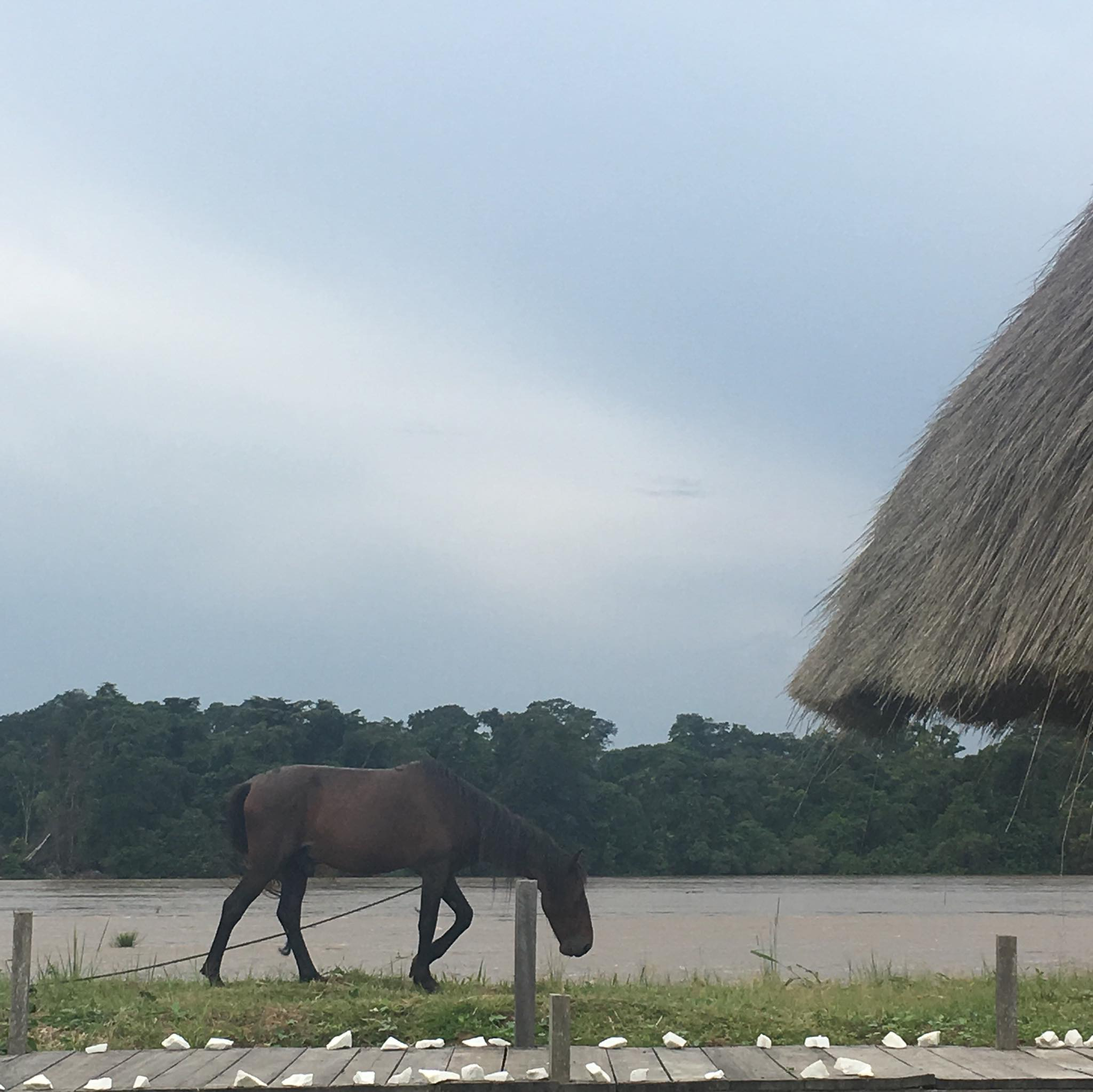
House

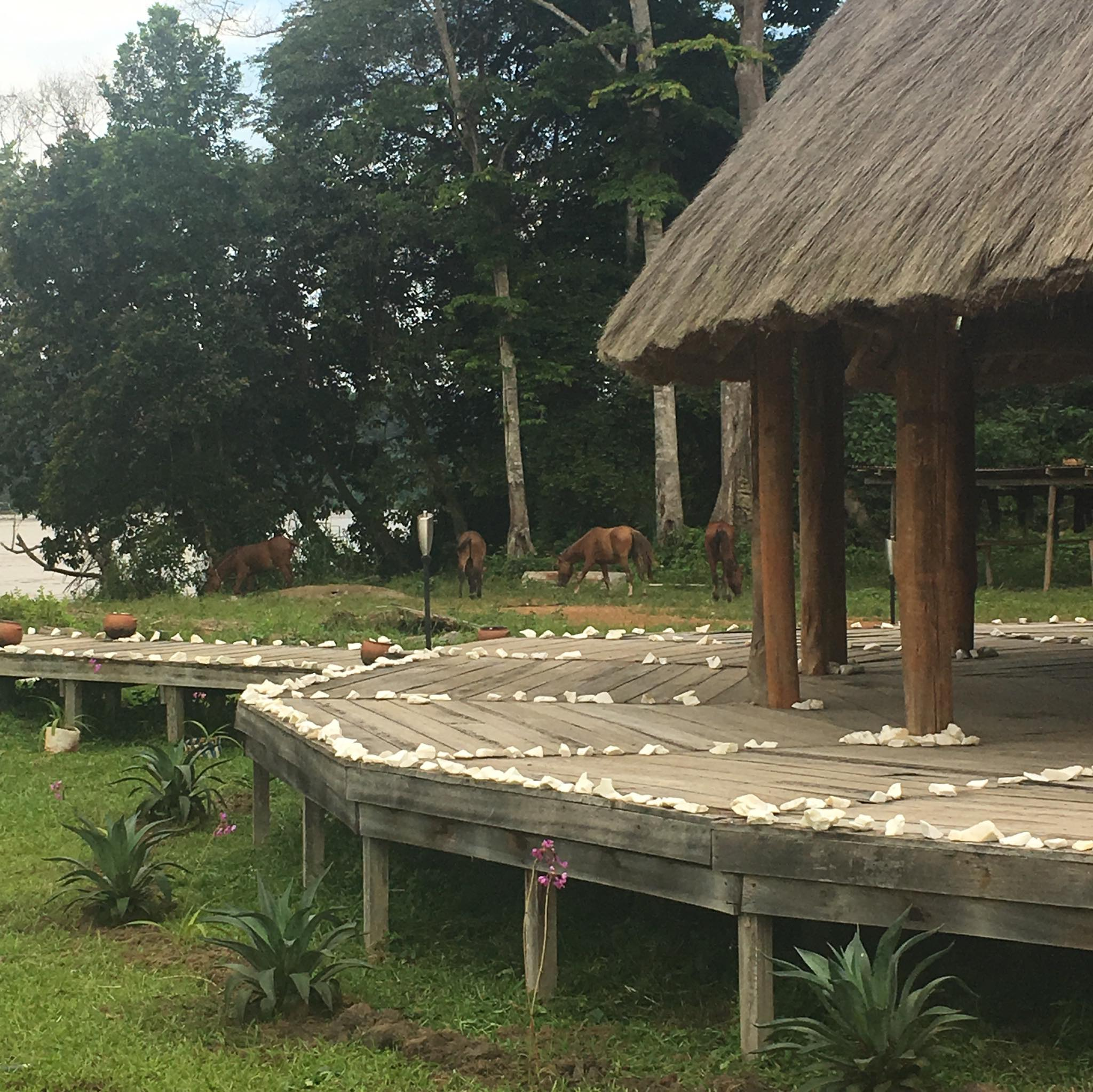
Horses near the cabin

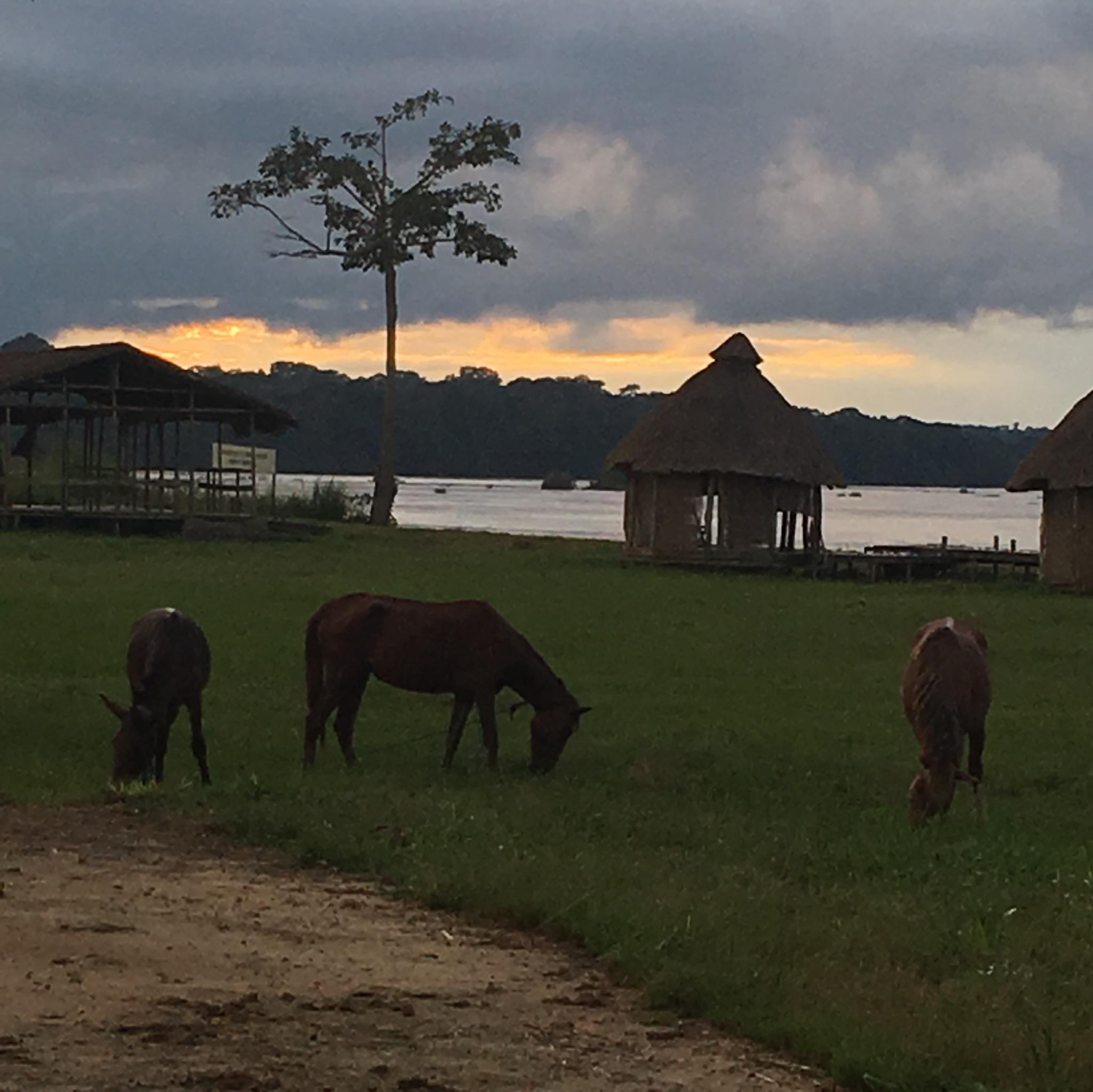
River in Nkolmetet

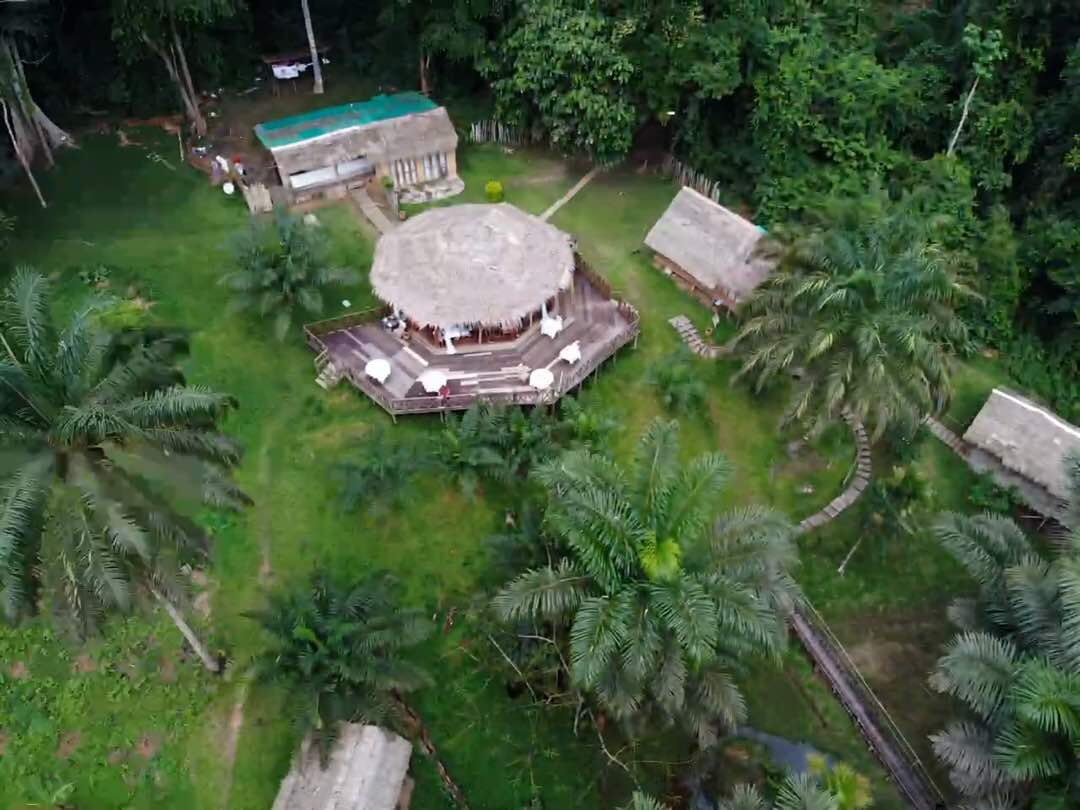
Lodge in Oveng Nkolmetet

== See also ==
- Communes of Cameroon
