= Nyong-et-So'o =

- Department
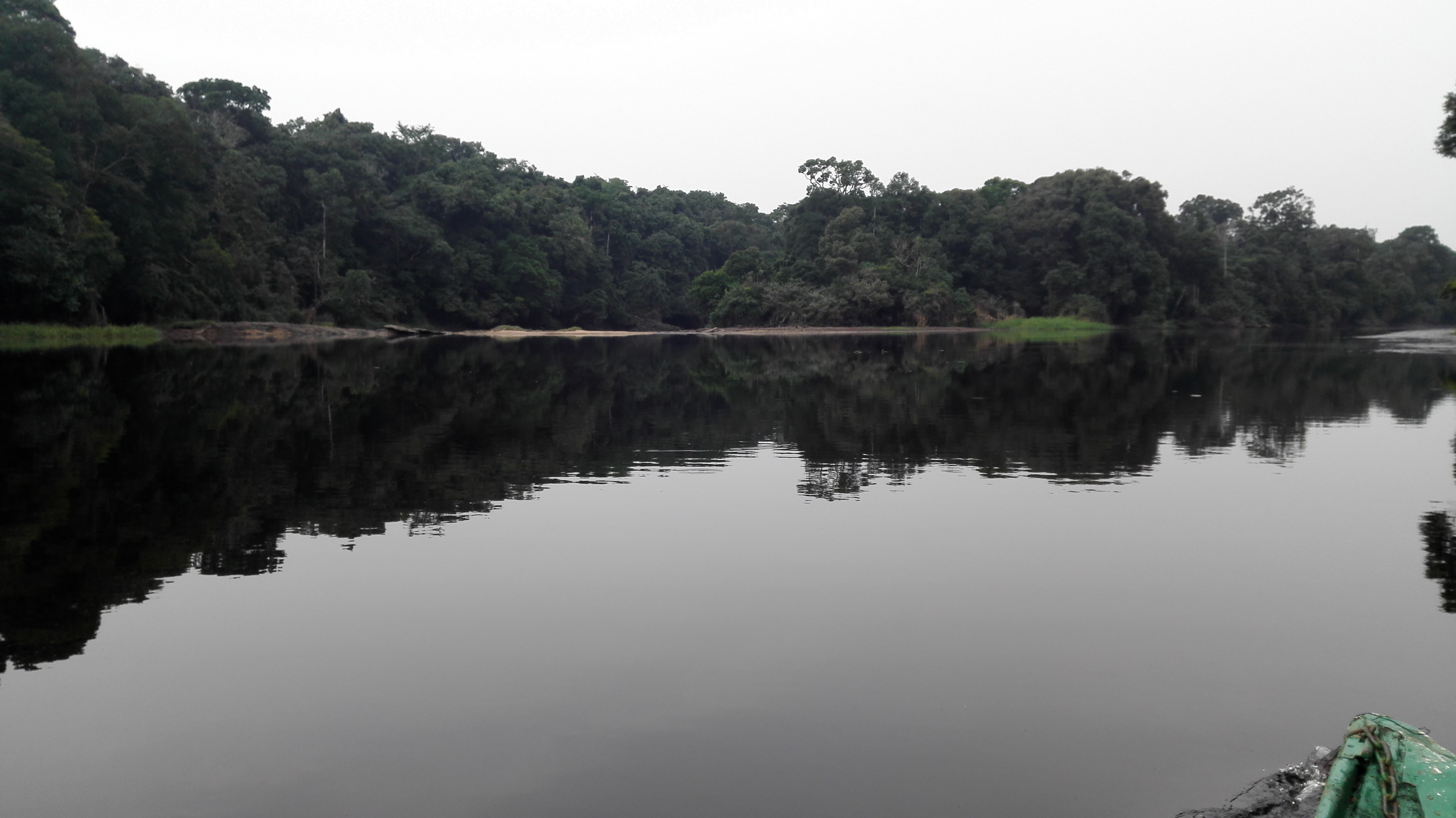
- Nyong et So'o

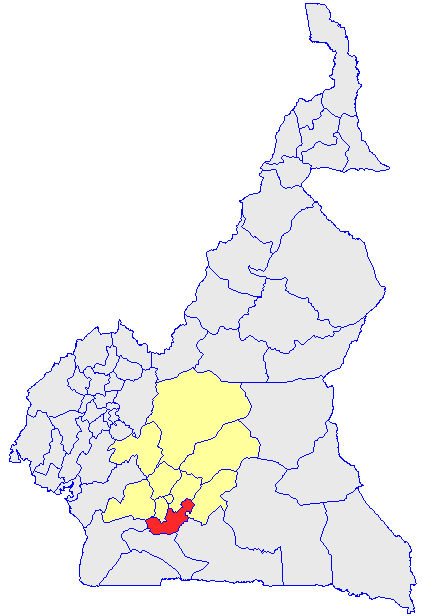
- Department location in Cameroon

- Location within Cameroon Location within Africa
- Country: Cameroon
- Province: Centre Province
- Capital: Mbalmayo

Area
  - Total: 1,383 sq mi (3,581 km^{2})

Population (2001)
  - Total: 142,907
- Time zone: UTC+1 (WAT)

Nyong-et-So'o is a department of Centre Province in Cameroon. The department covers an area of 3,581 km^{2} and as of 2001 had a total population of 142,907. The capital of the department lies at Mbalmayo.

== Subdivisions ==
The department is divided administratively into 6 communes and in turn into villages.

=== Communes ===
- Akoeman
- Dzeng
- Mbalmayo
- Mengueme
- Ngomedzap
- Nkolmetet

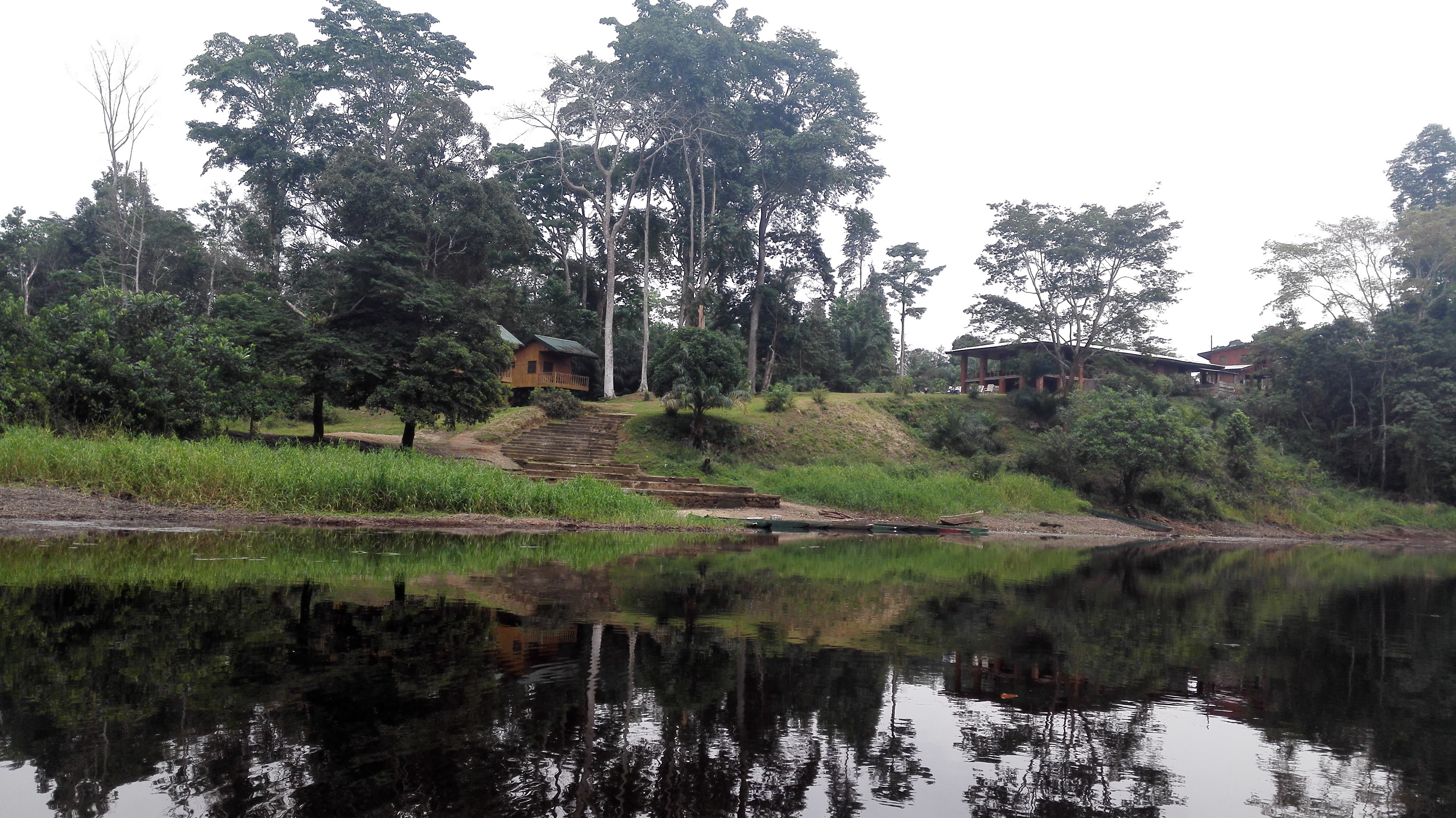
Nyong et So'o River

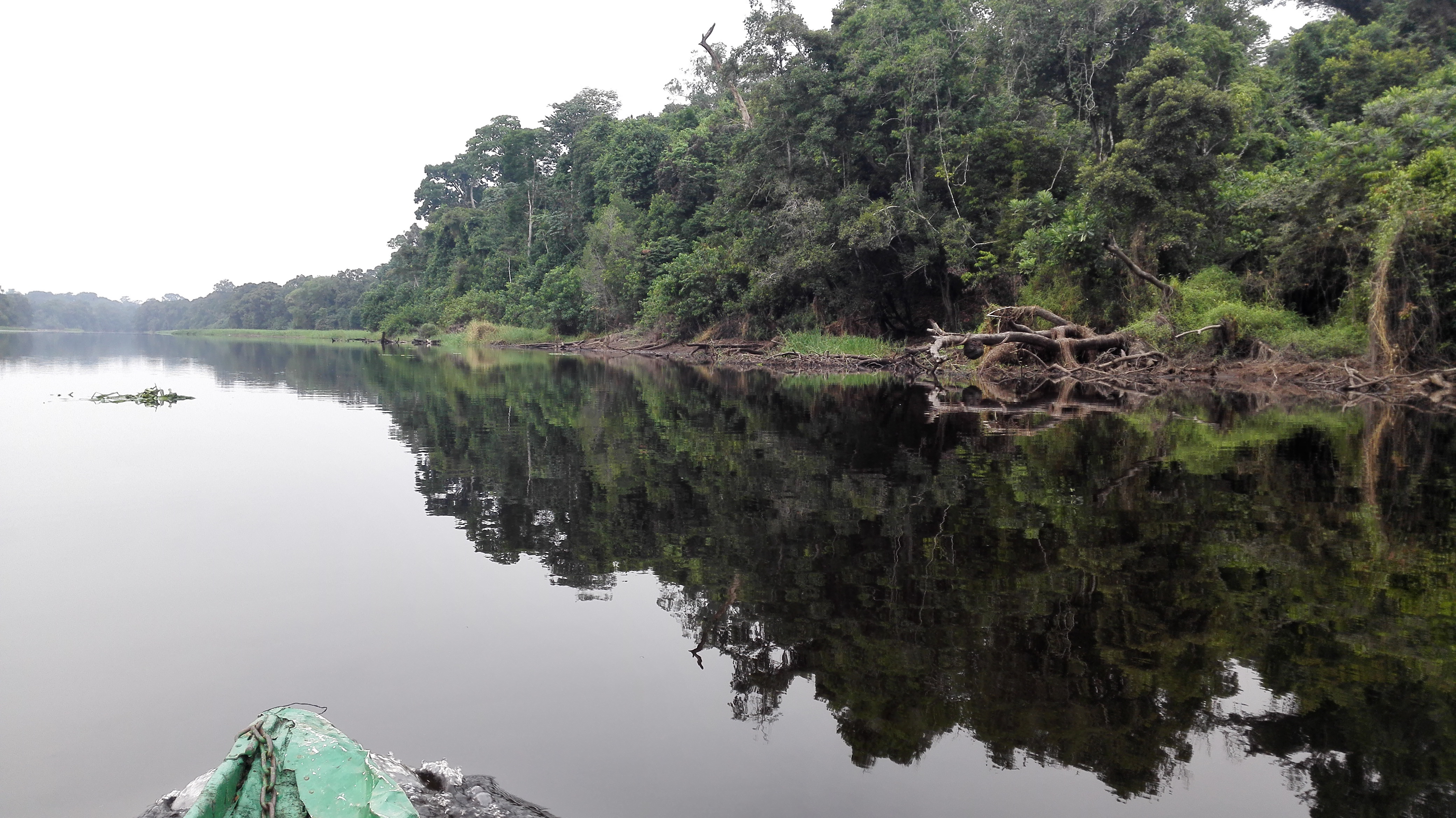
Nyong et So'o River From Ebogo
