= Ewondo language =

Bantu language spoken in Cameroon

Ewondo
- Beti; Cameroonian
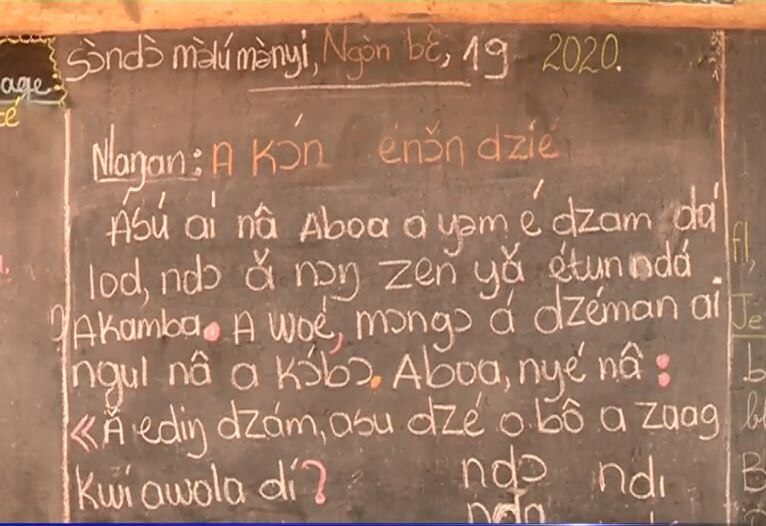
- Ewondo text on a blackboard at a school in Yaoundé, 2019
- Region: Cameroon
- Ethnicity: Beti people
- Native speakers: (580,000 cited 1982)
- Language family: Niger–Congo?: Atlantic–Congo; Volta-Congo; Benue–Congo; Bantoid; Southern Bantoid; Bantu (Zone A); Beti; Ewondo

Official status
- Official language in: Cameroon

Language codes
- ISO 639-2: ewo
- ISO 639-3: ewo
- Glottolog: ewon1239
- Guthrie code: A.72

Ewondo also known as Beti or Cameroonian is a Bantu language spoken by the Beti people (more precisely Beti be Nanga, the people of the forest, or simply Beti) of Cameroon. The language had 577,700 native speakers in 1982. Ewondo is a trade language. Dialects include Badjia (Bakjo), Bafeuk, Bemvele (Mvele, Yezum, Yesoum), Bane, Beti, Enoah, Evouzom, Mbida-Bani, Mvete, Mvog-Niengue, Omvang, Yabekolo (Yebekolo), Yabeka, and Yabekanga. Ewondo speakers live primarily in Cameroon's Centre Region and the northern part of the Océan division in the South Region.

Ewondo is a Bantu language. It is a language of the Beti people, and is intelligible with Eton.

In 2011, there was a concern among Cameroonian linguists that the language was being displaced in the country by French.

== Distribution ==
Ewondo (Beti) covers the whole of the departments of Mfoundi, Mefou-et-Afamba, Mefou-et-Akono, Nyong-et-So'o, Nyong-et-Mfoumou (Central Region), and part of Océan Department (Southern Region).

== History ==
The Ewondo language originated in the forests south of the Sanaga river.

== Phonology ==
=== Consonants ===
Ewondo consonants
		Labial	Alveolar	Palatal	Velar	Labio- velar	Glottal
Plosive	voiceless	p	t		k	k͡p	
Plosive	voiced	b	d		ɡ	ɡ͡b	
Plosive	prenasal	ᵐb	ⁿd		ᵑɡ	ᵑᵐɡ͡b	
Affricate	voiceless		t͡s				
Affricate	voiced		d͡z				
Affricate	prenasal		ⁿd͡z				
Fricative	voiceless	f	s				h
Fricative	voiced	v	z				
Fricative	prenasal	ᶬv					
Nasal		m	n	ɲ	ŋ		
Lateral			l				
Rhotic			r				
Approximant				j		w	

=== Vowels ===
Ewondo vowels
	Front	Central	Back
Close	i		u
Close-mid	e	ə	o
Open-mid	ɛ	ə	ɔ
Open		a	

== Alphabet system ==
Alphabet in Ewondo
Uppercase
A	B	D	Dz	E	Ə	Ɛ	F	G	Gb	H	I	K	Kp	L	M	Mb	Mgb	Mv	N	Nd	Ndz	Ng	Ny	Ŋ	O	Ɔ	P	R	U	T	Ts	S	V	W	Y	Z
Lowercase
a	b	d	dz	e	ə	ɛ	f	g	gb	h	i	k	kp	l	m	mb	mgb	mv	n	nd	ndz	ng	ny	ŋ	o	ɔ	p	r	u	t	ts	s	v	w	y	z
Phonemes
a	b	d	d͡z	e	ə	ɛ	f	ɡ	ɡ͡b	h	i	k	k͡p	l	m	m͡b	mɡ͡b	ɱ͡v	n	n͡d	nd͡z	ŋ͡ɡ	ɲ	ŋ	o	ɔ	p	r	u	t	t͡s	s	v	w	j	z

The tones are indicated with diacritics on the vowels:

- the high tone is indicated with an acute accent: á é ə́ ɛ́ í ó ɔ́ ú;
- the mid-high tone is indicated with a grave accent: à è ə̀ ɛ̀ ì ò ɔ̀ ù;
- the mid tone is indicated with a macron: ā ē ə̄ ɛ̄ ī ō ɔ̄ ū;
- the low tone the most frequent tone, is indicated by the absence of diacritics: a e ə ɛ i o ɔ u;
- the mid-low tone, is also indicated by the absence of diacritics: a e ə ɛ i o ɔ u;
- the rising tone is indicated with a caron: ǎ ě ə̌ ɛ̌ ǐ ǒ ɔ̌ ǔ;
- the falling tone is indicated with a circumflex: â ê ə̂ ɛ̂ î ô ɔ̂ û.

== See also ==
- Ewondo Populaire
