= Fang people =

Bantu ethnic group in west-central Africa

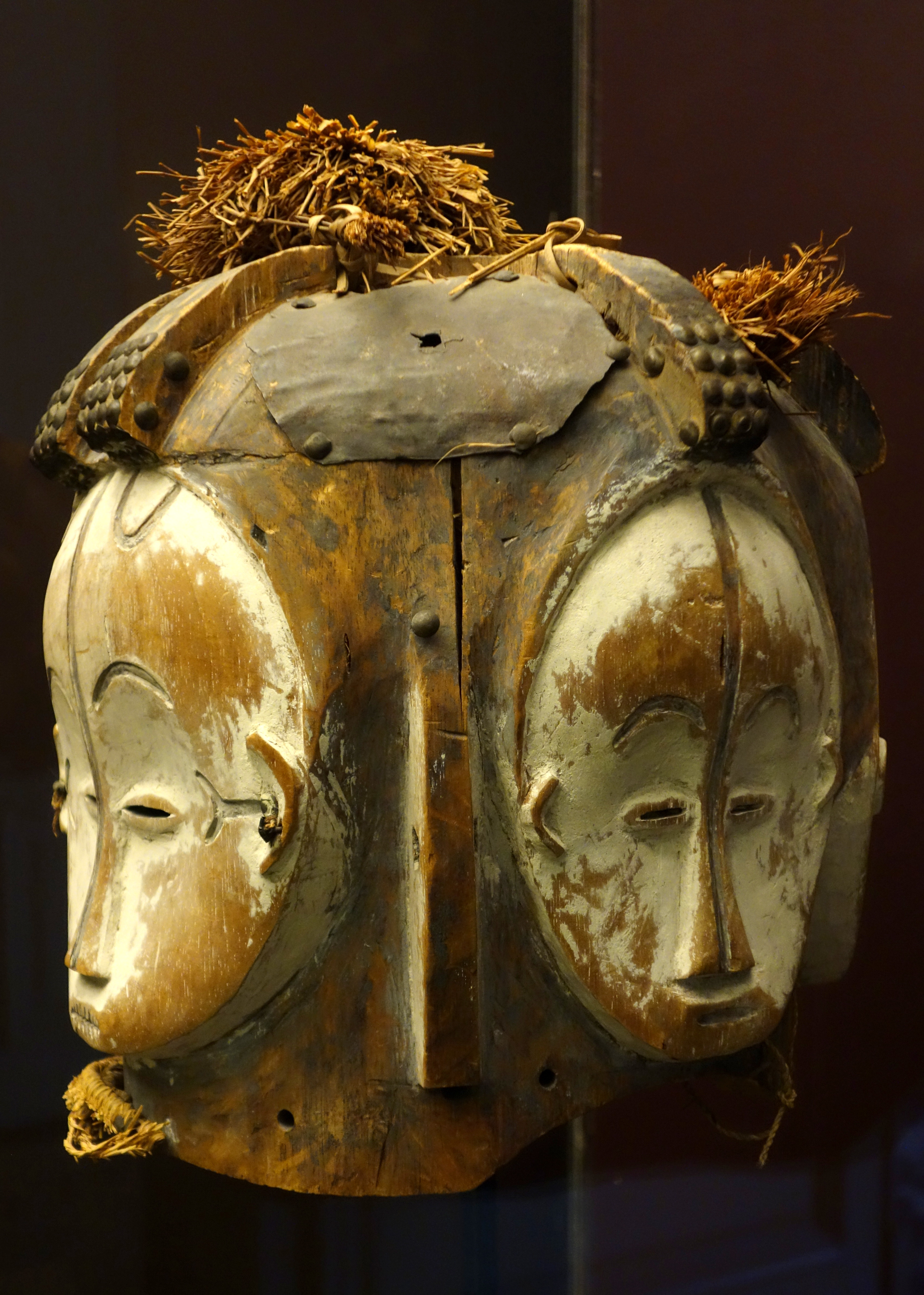
- 4-faced Ngontang mask of Fang people

Total population
- ~1 million

Regions with significant populations
- Equatorial Guinea (85%); Cameroon; Gabon; Republic of the Congo

Languages
- Fang language

Religion
- Christianity, Traditional African religion, Islam

Related ethnic groups
- Other Beti-Pahuin peoples

The Fang people, also known as Fãn or Pahouin, are an ethnic group found in Equatorial Guinea, northern Gabon, and southern Cameroon. Some Fang also live in the Republic of the Congo. Representing about 85% of the total population of Equatorial Guinea, concentrated in the Río Muni region, the Fang people are its largest ethnic group. The Fang are also the largest ethnic group in Gabon, making up about a quarter of the population.

== Language ==
The Fang people speak the Fang language, also known as Pahouin or Pamue or Pangwe. The language is a Northwest Bantu language belonging to the Niger-Congo family of languages. The Fang language is similar and intelligible with languages spoken by Beti-Pahuin peoples, namely the Beti people to their north and the Bulu people in central. Their largest presence is in the southern regions, up to the Ogooué River estuary where anthropologists refer them also as "Fang proper".

They have preserved their history largely through a musical oral tradition. Many Fang people are fluent in Spanish, French, German and English, a tradition of second language they developed during the Spanish colonial rule in Equatorial Guinea, the French colonial rule in Gabon and the German-later-French colonial rule in Cameroon.

== History ==
The Fang people are relatively recent migrants into Equatorial Guinea, and many of them moved from central Cameroon in the 19th century.

Early ethnologists conjectured them to be Nilotic peoples from the upper Nile area. The people of Modern-day Gabon, and the Fang themselves have a commonly shared belief that the Fang, as well as their language, are not Bantu. Scholars such as Cheikh Anta Diop support this claim. Opponents of the claim typically rely on linguistic studies. A combination of evidence now places them to be of Bantu origins who began moving back into Africa around the seventh or eighth century possibly because of invasions from the north and the wars of sub-Saharan Africa. Their migration may be related to an attempt to escape the violence of slave raiding by the Hausa people, but this theory has been contested. Using glottochronology, historians have situated Proto-Fang speakers in the Southern Cameroon rainforest more than 4,000 years ago.

They were stereotyped as cannibals by explorer and missionaries, in part because human skulls and bones were found in open or in wooden boxes near their villages, a claim used to justify violence against them and their enslavement. When their villages were raided, thousands of their wooden idols and villages were burnt by the colonial administration. Later ethnologists who actually spent time with the Fang people later discovered that the Fang people were not cannibalistic: the human bones in open and wooden boxes were of their ancestors, and were Fang people's method of routine remembrance and religious reverence for their dead loved ones.

== Society and culture ==
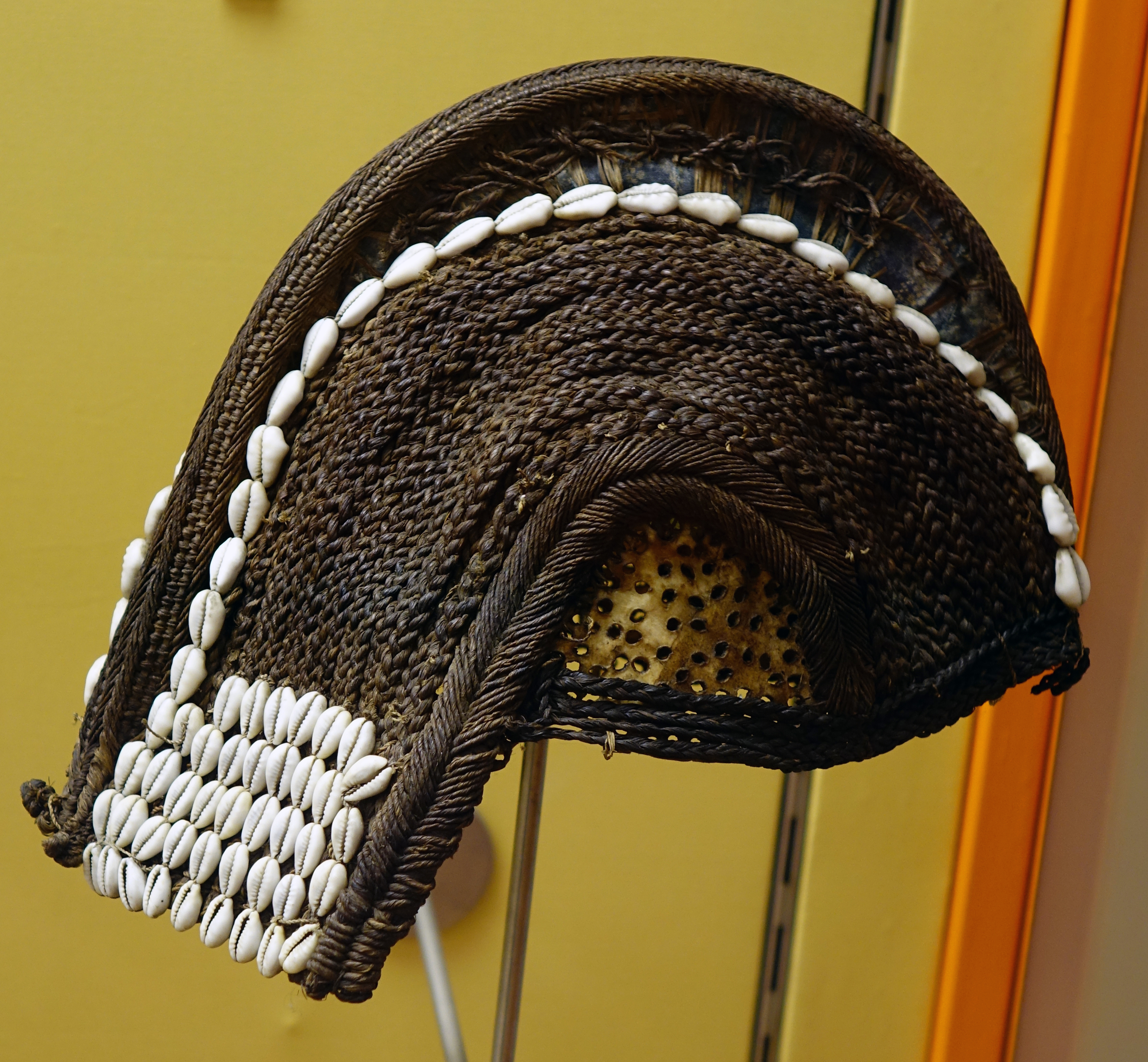
A head dress of the Fang people with embedded artwork.

They have a patrilineal kinship social structure. The villages have been traditionally linked through lineage. They are exogamous, particularly on the father's side. Polygamy was accepted in the culture of the Fang people. The independence of villages from each other is notable, and they are famed for their knowledge of the animals, plants, and herbs in the equatorial forests in which they live. They are traditionally farmers and hunters, but became major cocoa farmers during the colonial era.

Under French colonial rule, they converted to Christianity. However, since independence, their interest in their own traditional religion, called Biere, also spelled Byeri, has returned, and many practice syncretic ideas and rites. One of the syncretic traditions among Fang people is called Bwiti, a monotheistic religion that celebrates Christian Easter but over four days with group dancing, singing, and psychedelic drinks.

== Art ==
The artworks of Fang people, particularly from wood, iron, and steatite, are regionally famous. Their wooden masks and idol carvings are on display at numerous museums of the world.

Discovery of Fang artwork was source of inspiration for much of the European avant-garde artwork created during the 20th century. Much of the art either is used for their masquerades or functions as reliquaries and effigies. All are primarily made by the men of the village. There is reason to believe that many of these reliquaries were made during the Fangs' migration as a form of burial which was also portable.

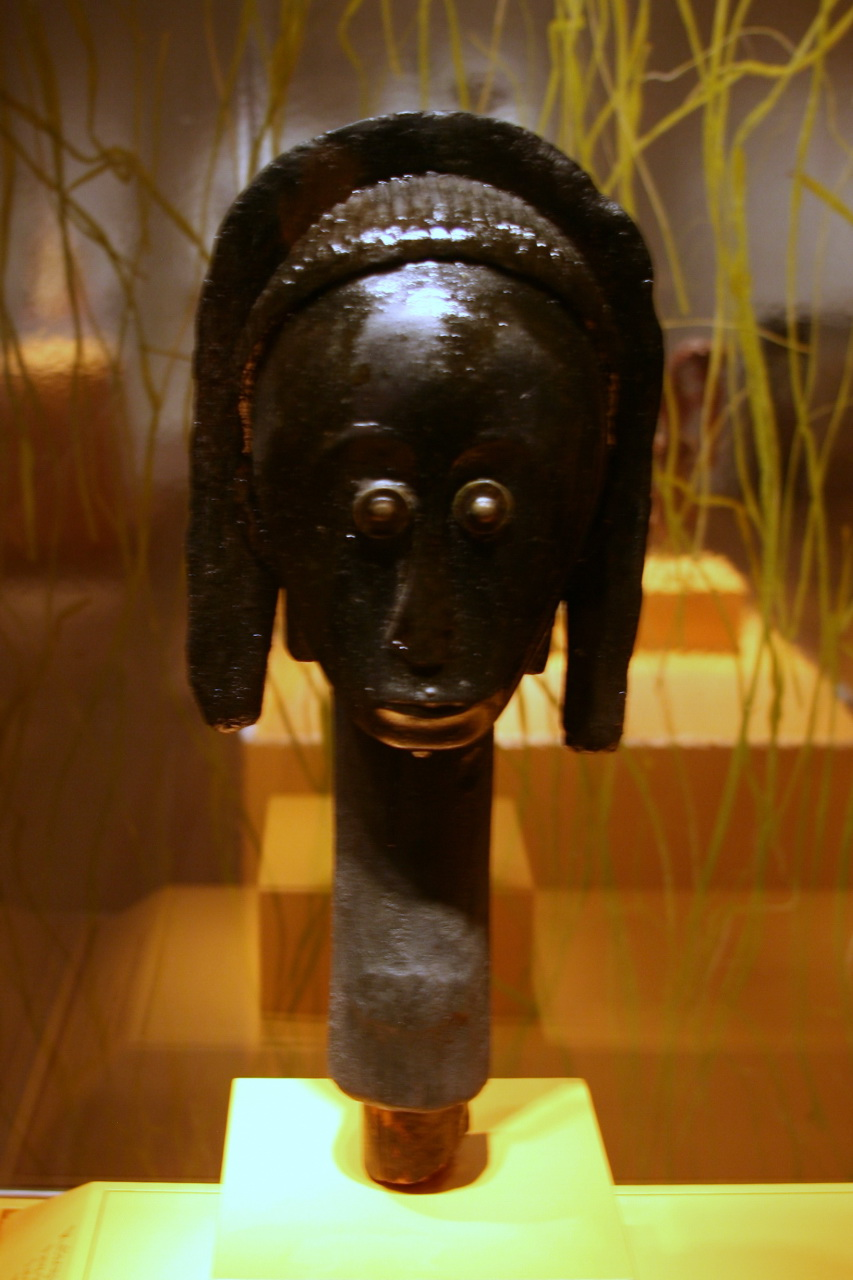
Reliquary guardian head, Fang peoples, Gabon. Late 19th to early 20th century. Wood, metal, oil patina

=== Wooden heads ===
One of the most popular art forms attributed to the Fang culture are the wooden reliquary heads, many of which contain the skull or bones of ancestors. There is a characteristic heart-shaped, concave face and large bulbous forehead. The heads are very abstract, focus on geometric form, and are covered in a black patina. Some appear to 'cry', which is streaks of resin made from a mixture of palm oil and other seed oils. The heads are tied to the ideas of welfare and social power.

Heads are an effigy and can be affixed to a wooden reliquary box/barrel. The bones and skulls of deceased leaders are kept in cylindrical boxes that are decorated with wooden sculptured figures. These bones are believed to have special powers that protect the well-being of the community. The bones are always within the possession of the deceased leader's family, and they are kept hidden from the eyes of the uninitiated and of women.

=== Reliquary figures ===
Throughout Gabon, these figures serve as talisman or guardian to protect the remains of ancestors. Known as bieri, byeri or mwan bian, these reliquary figures widely range in style, but most common characteristics are:

- short, rounded body parts
- long torso
- a large head
- a prominent forehead and concave face

Some earlier figures had cavities in the abdomen as a place to store bones of ancestors. The figures aren't completed until they are ceremoniously presented and rubbed with palm oil. Members of the community will continually visit figures and rub them with oil so they maintain their protective powers.

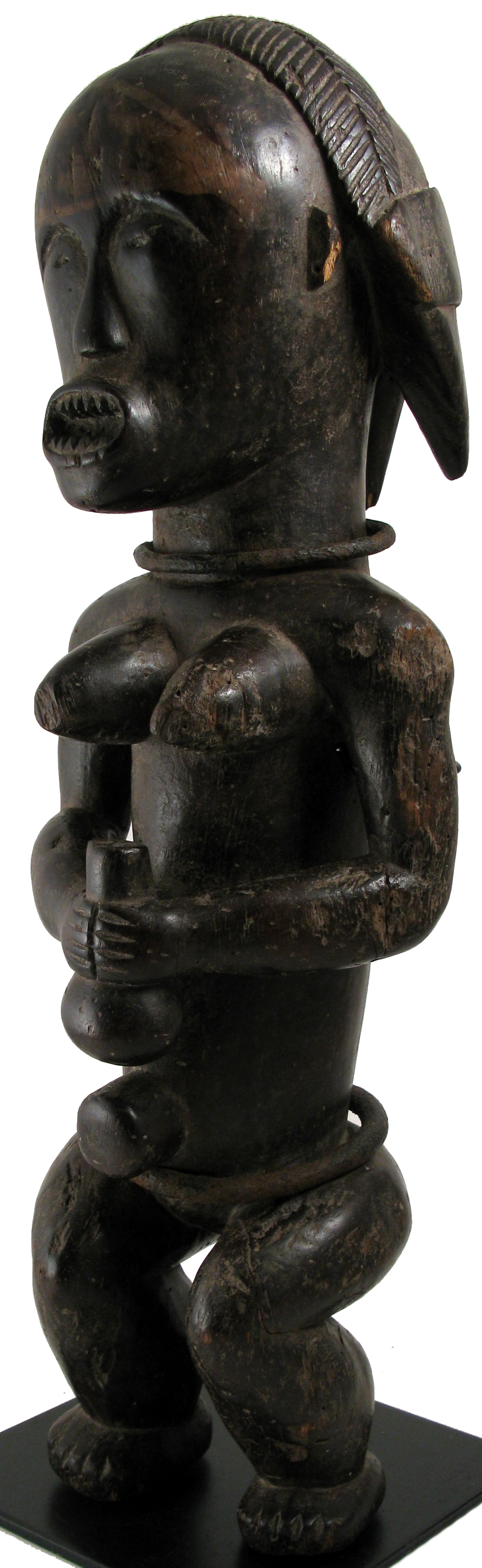
1617 Byeri reliquary figure, Fang, Gabon. The Byeri Figure used as a guardian statue to surmount the Reliquary Byeri Box in which bones of important ancestors were held.

It was during colonization that many of these reliquaries had to be destroyed due to missionary and government pressure.

== Music ==
Music plays a central role to the oral history of the Fang. The mvet is a musical instrument popular in the Fang society, which is played by the mbomo mvet. The instrument is a chordophone with attached resonators. Often, one resonator is regarded as 'male' and the other as 'female'. Some mvet come with two, three, or even five strings. To become a master mbomo mvet takes years of dedication and sacrifice.

The mbomo mvet will often pass through villages once a month to play at the council house where all members of the village will gather to be entertained. Members of the community participate by keeping time while the mbomo mvet plays and sings praises to the ancestors.

== See also ==
- Beti-Pahuin peoples
- Masque Ngontang
