= Mbalmayo =

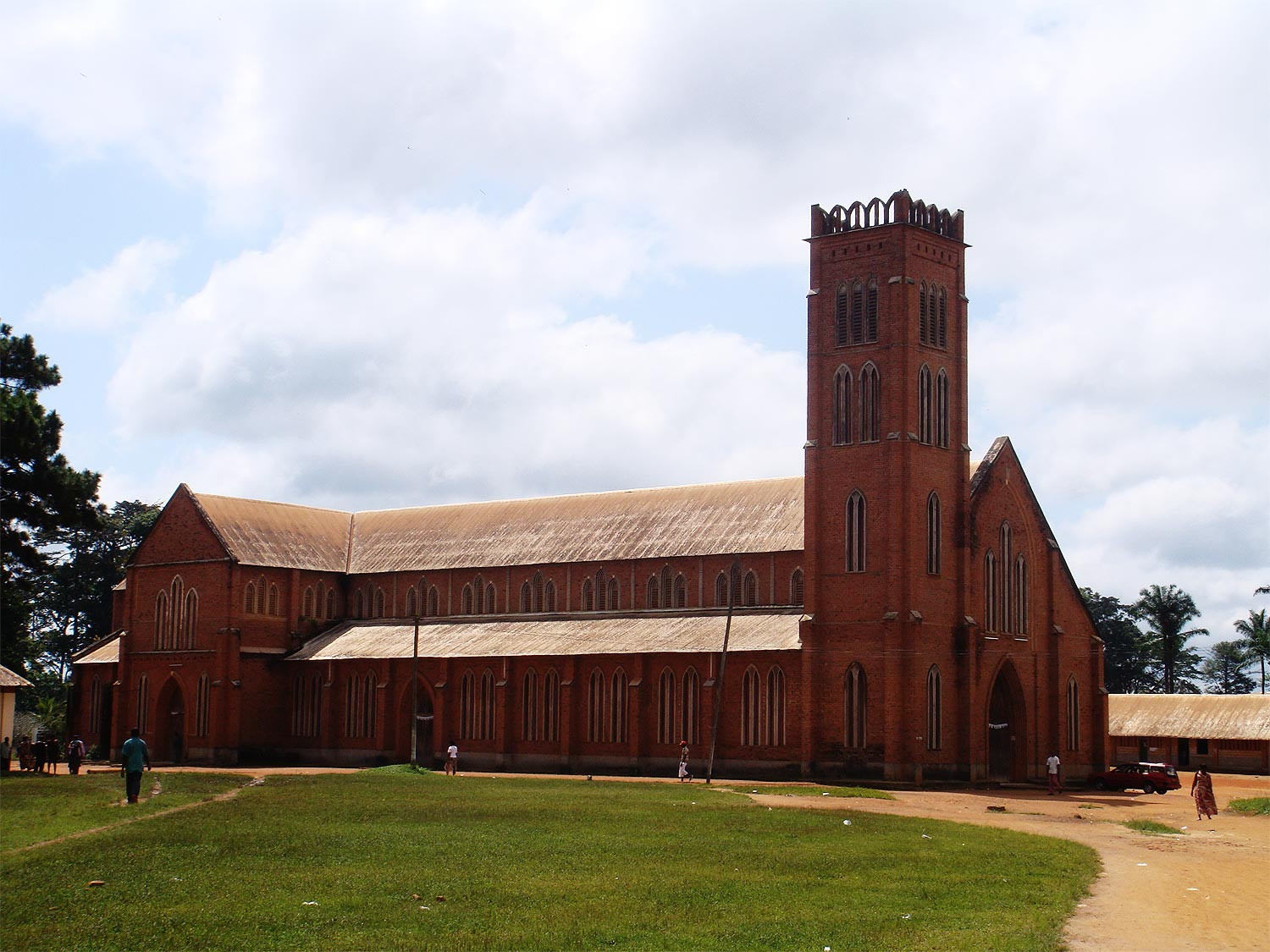
- Mbalmayo cathedral

- Location in Cameroon
- Coordinates: 3°31′N 11°30′E
- Country: Cameroon
- Province: Centre Province
- Elevation: 335 m (1,099 ft)

Population (2012)
  - Total: 60,091

Mbalmayo is a town in Cameroon's Centre Region. The town had 60,091 inhabitants in 2012. It is the capital of the Nyong-et-So'o Division It is located at the banks of the Nyong river between Ebolowa and Yaoundé. It is an agricultural centre.

== History ==
Mbalmayo was founded in 1910, under the German rule of the then Kamerun, by Mbala Meyo, an early ruler of the town. As was the custom before colonialism, the town was named after the chief.

The Germans ruled the town and used the Nyong river to transport timber which was a major source of income. It is in the part of Cameroon that the League of Nations made a French protectorate.

== Economy ==
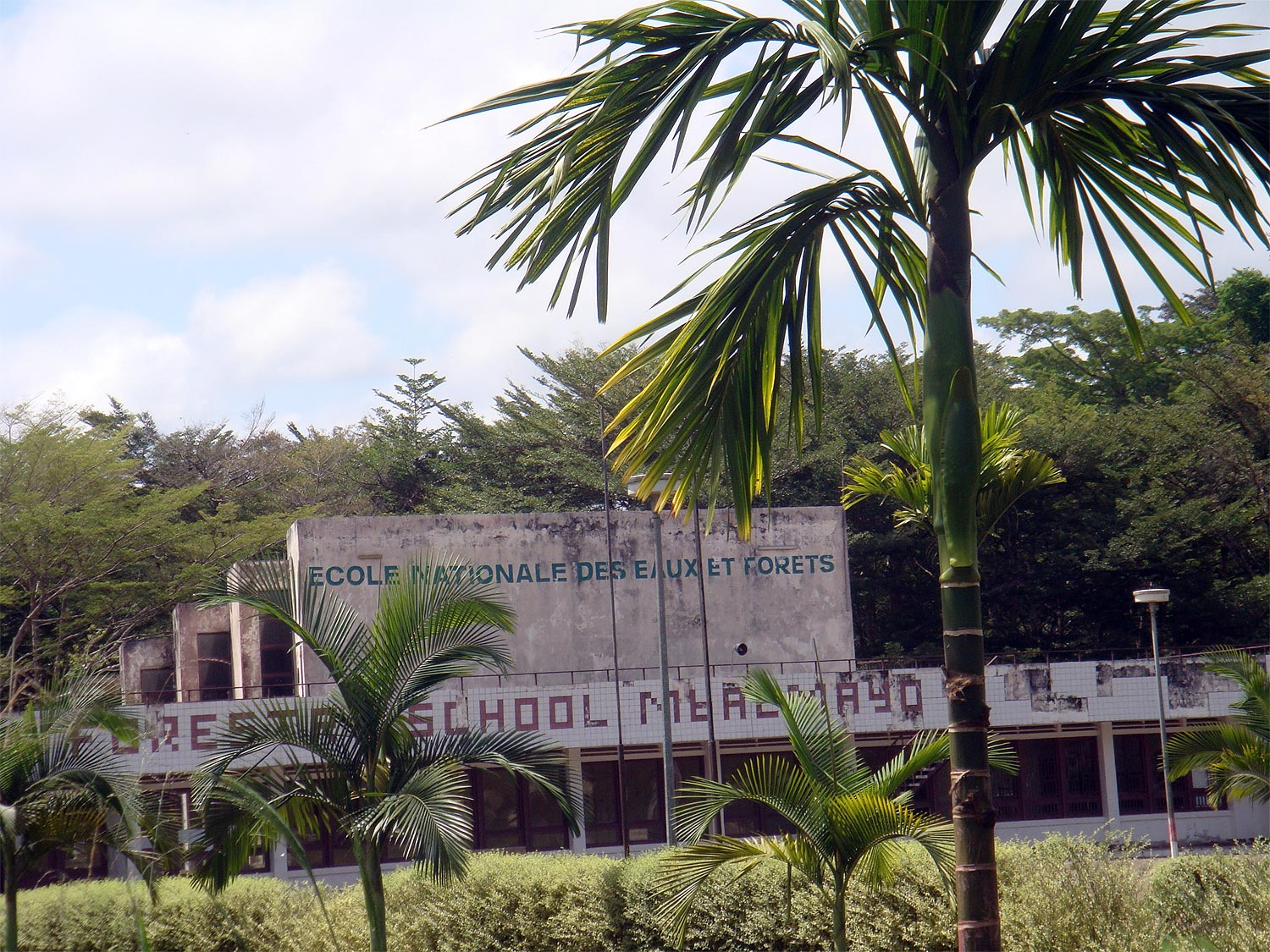
Mbalmayo forestry school

Mbalmayo is an industrial town that is about 41 km from Yaoundé the Capital of Cameroon. Mbalmayo is located in the Central Region of Cameroon. It is situated along the Nyong River, south of Yaoundé. Since it is deeply entrenched in the dense equatorial forest zone that stretched to the South, its natural physical environmental features makes it strategically economical located. The main economic activities are forestry and agriculture. There is a plywood factory powered by electricity from the Edea Hydroelectric Power Station. It is a big commercial center.

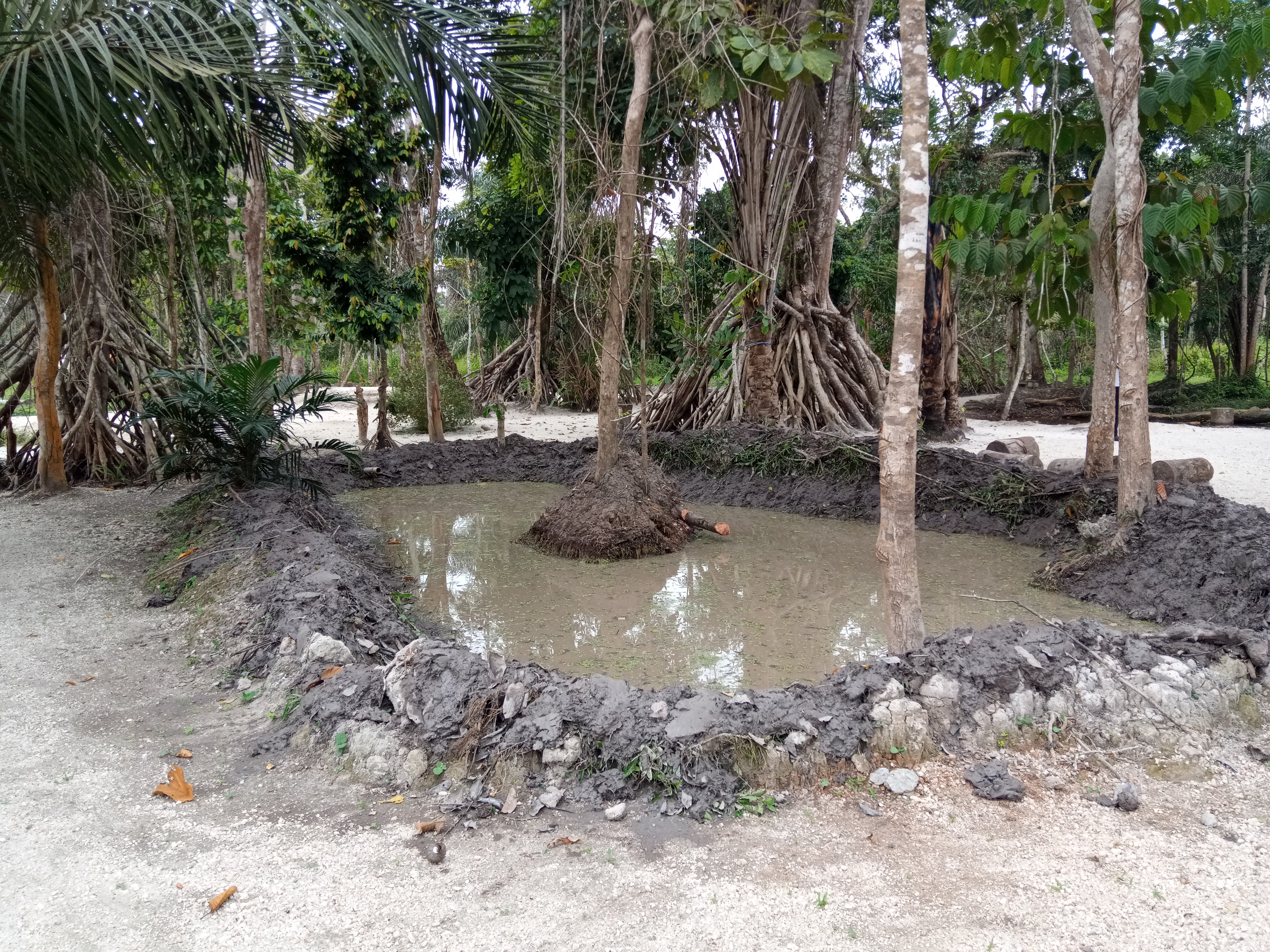
Fish farming

It is also a commercial centre due to its position at the junction of three transportation routes: it lies on the main road south from Yaoundé; it is the terminus of the Camrail railway from Douala; and serves as a river port on the Nyong River, which is seasonally navigable for 249 kilometres (155 mi) from Mbalmayo east to Abong Mbang. In order to improve and to increase its economic activities, the Government of Cameroon in 1989, through partnership with the African Development Bank was able to construct a 101 km road that links Mbalmayo with Ebolowa, the capital of the South Province. Amongst its economic activities, Timber exploration is a major source of revenue for Mbalmayo and Cameroon in general. There is the Mbalmayo's forest reserve which is one of Cameroon's oldest forest reserve. Other cash crops include palm oil, palm kernel oil, coffee and cocoa.

== Politics ==
Cameroon was formerly divided administratively into ten provinces now referred to today as regions. Administration of these Regions is based on the administrative set up of Cameroon which is a decentralized state. Mbalmayo is politically and administratively managed under the Central region and a local collectivity called Mbalmayo municipal council. It is a sub-division of the Nyong-et-So'o Division. The administration of the division and the subdivisions is directly under the Ministry of Territorial Administration. Mbalmayo is the administrative headquarters of the Nyong et So'o division. Since independence, this division has been dominated by two political parties but other political parties do exist in the town such as SDF, UNDP, MRC, UPC etc.- The CNU and the CPDM. However, ironically, these two parties were just the same party that underwent a name change. In 1985, CNU was changed to CPDM-Cameroon People Democratic Movement under the leadership of Paul Biya. Since 1968, there have been 6 Mayors elected in Mbalmayo. The longest-serving mayor was AMOUGOU MBIDA Samue but his record has been beaten by the incombent, he served as Mayor of the Municipality for 17 years. He was also the Mayor in place during the political transition from Amadou Ahidjo to Paul Biya, and from the CNU to the CPDM.

Mayors of the Mbalmayo Municipal Council

1. Abbé MBARGA Maurice 1958 CNU 8 Months
2. MBALLA FOE Martin 1959–1970 CNU 11 years
3. AMOUGOU MBIDA Samuel 1970–1987 CNU-CPDM 17 years
4. ABAH Stanisla 1987–1996 CPDM 9 years
5. NNOMEDOUE MENDOUGA Thomas 1996–2002 CPDM 6 Years
6. ZANG MBA OBELE Dieudonné 2002 CPDM current. The first four are of late.

== Transport ==
A good transport network is very critical for any real development to take place. Generally, most towns and villages in Cameroon are not easily accessible due to the poor road and transport network. Mbalmayo is, however, accessible by asphalt roads from Yaounde. By train it is the southern terminus of the railroad from Douala. The river Nyong is also commonly used as a mean of transport by locals and fishermen. The river runs for 250 km from Mbalmayo to the east of Abong-Mbang. Understanding the role of transport in economic development, the Government of Cameroon in 1987, secured a loan worth UA 47.15 million from the African Development Bank to finance the construction of a dual carriage way between Mbalmayo and Ebolowa in the south. The project was completed in 1991 by the firms COGEFAR Cameroon and Razel-Bec and works were supervised by BCEOM Cameroon and LABOGENIE. The project covered over 100 km of paved road.

The project has contributed significantly to opening up of the southern province and made possible the development of agriculture and forest production in the project area. Since timber harvesting is the biggest contributor to the economy of the southern province, transportation of both humans and goods have been made easy. "Thanks to the improvement of travelling conditions and the lowering of transport costs, women play a more important role in production and in the associative life of the region. Trade, particularly in food commodities between Cameroon and her neighbours has intensified since the commissioning of the road. Nevertheless, the road’s contribution to increased regional integration will be significant only when the entire Yaoundé-Libreville route, which has several sections in poor condition, has been developed."

== Notable people ==
- Jérôme Onguéné (born 1997), association football player
