= Nyong River =

River in Cameroon

Nyong river Yong
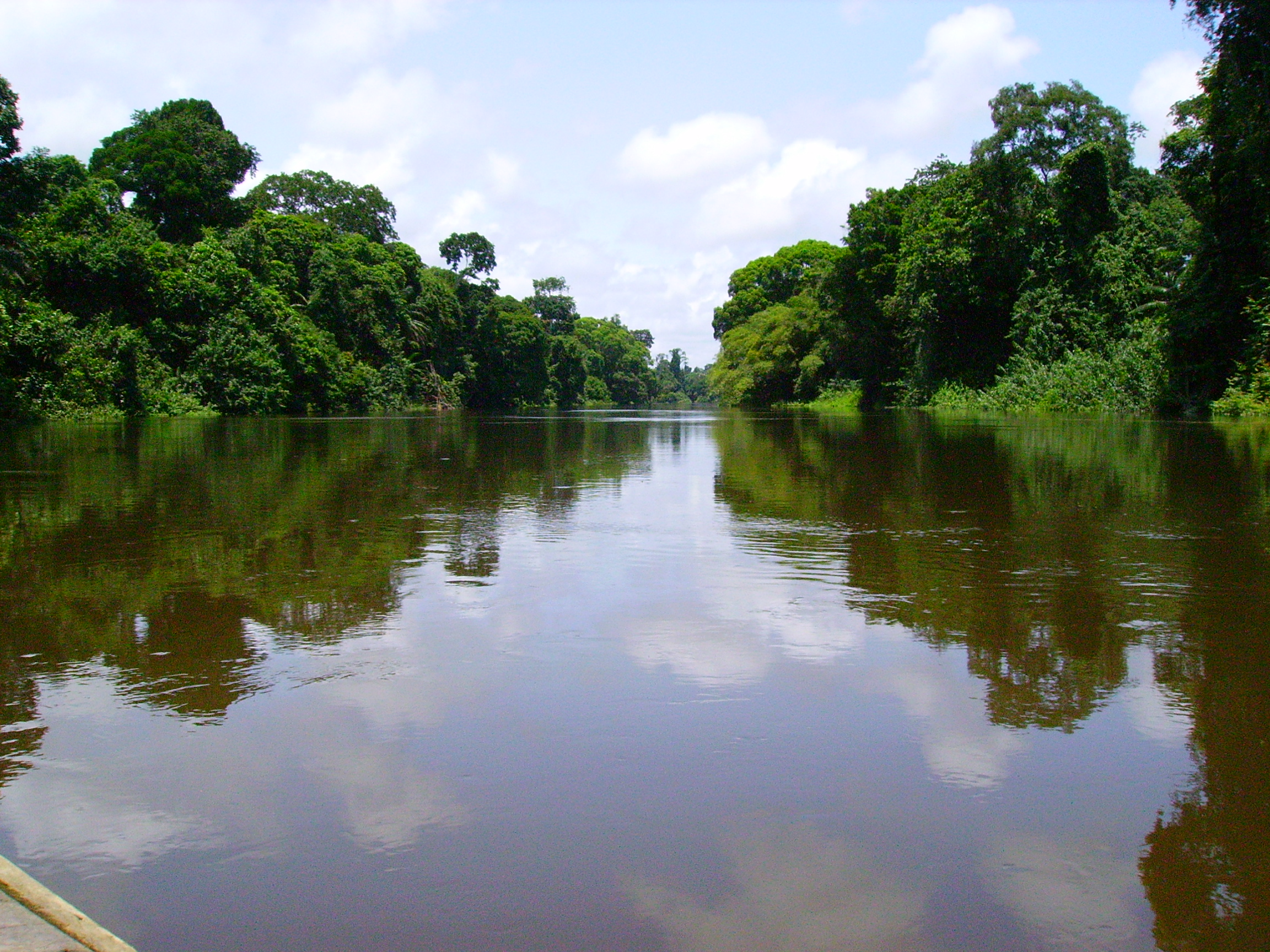
- Nyong River

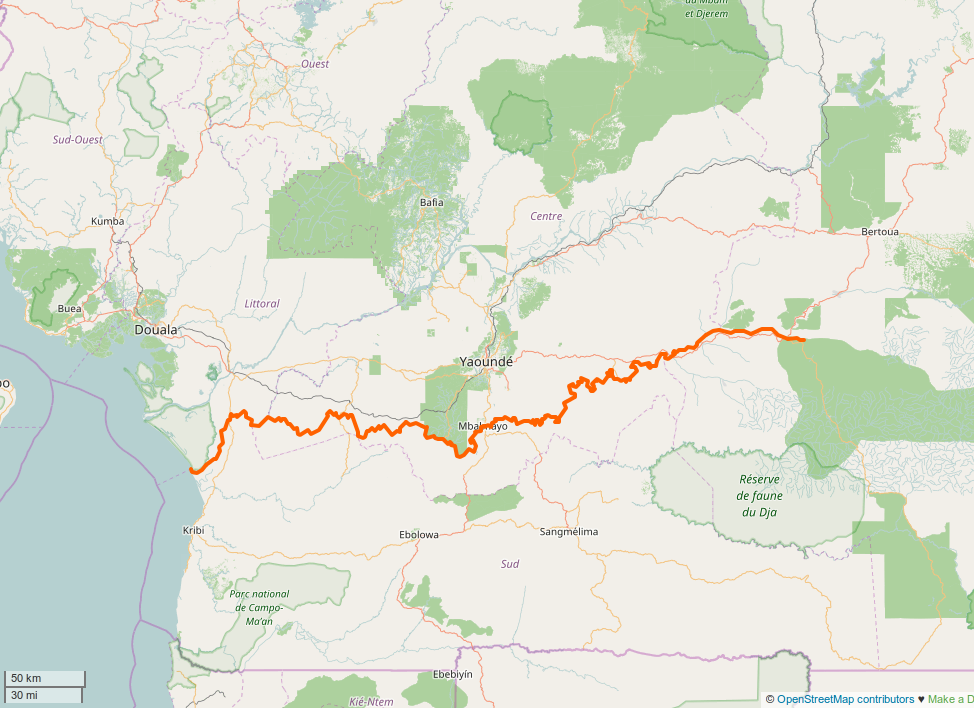
- The Nyong River in Cameroon

Location
- Country: Cameroon
- Regions: Littoral Region, East Region, South Region, Centre RegionCentre Region
- Cities: Abong-Mbang, Mbalmayo

Physical characteristics
- Source
  - location: Near Abong-Mbang
  - coordinates: 3°52′00″N 13°28′00″E
  - elevation: 690 m (2,260 ft)
- Mouth: Bight of Biafra
  - coordinates: 3°15′39″N 9°54′16″E
  - elevation: 0 m
- Length: 690 km (430 mi)
- Basin size: 27,800 km^{2} (10,734 mi^{2})
- Discharge
  - location: Déhané
  - average: 446 m^{3}/s (15,800 cu ft/s)
  - minimum: 40 m^{3}/s (1,400 cu ft/s)
  - maximum: 1,226 m^{3}/s (43,300 cu ft/s)

Basin features
- River system: Nyong River
- Population: 1,179,200
- Tributaries
  - left: Long Mafok, Soo, Soumou, Kama
  - right: Kom, Mfoumou, Afamba, Ato, Mefou, Akono, Liyeke, Kéllé
- Waterfalls: Trappenbeck Rapids

The Nyong (formerly German: Yong) is a river in Cameroon. The river flows approximately 690 kilometres (430 mi) to empty into the Gulf of Guinea.

== Course ==
The Nyong originates 40 km (25 mi) east of the town of Abong-Mbang, where the northern rain forest feeds it. The river's length is almost parallel to the lower reaches of the Sanaga River. Its mouth is in Petit Batanga, 60 km (40 mi) south-southwest of Edéa. In two places, Mbalmayo and Déhané, the river has huge rapids. The first 400 km (250 mi) of the river, between Abong-Mbang and Mbalmayo, are navigable for small boats from April to November.

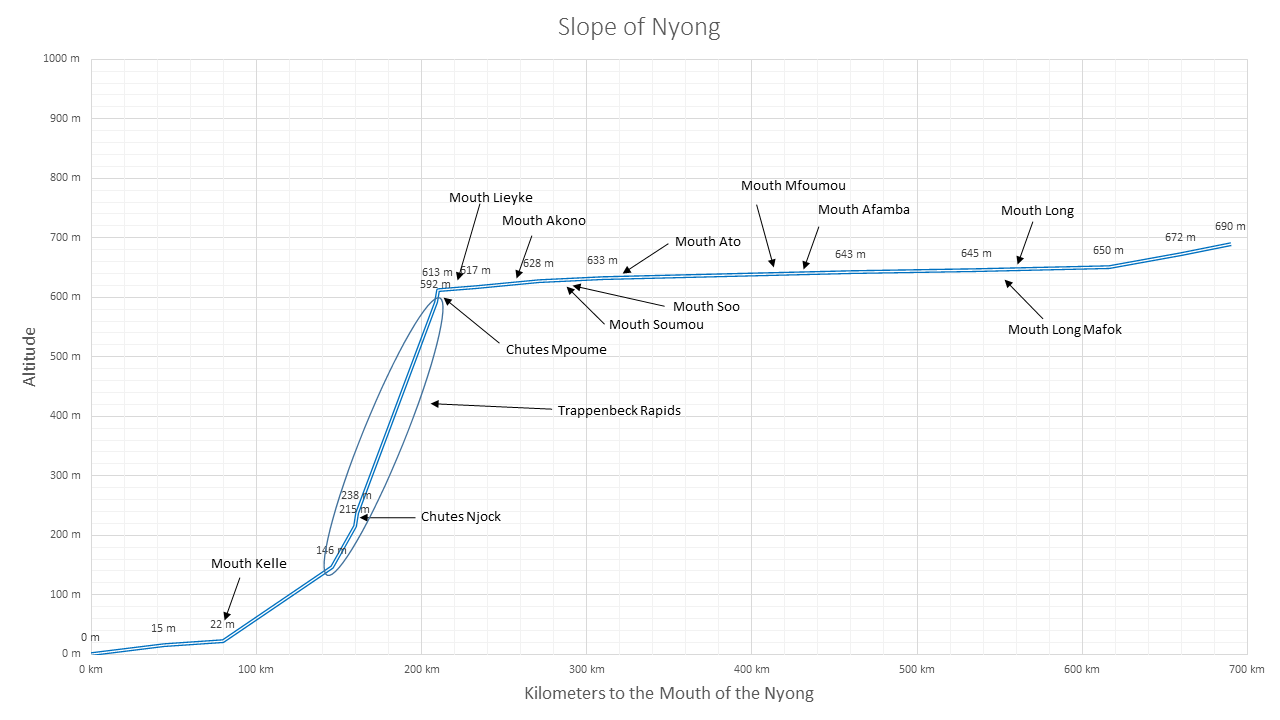
Slope of Nyong River

== Hydrology ==
The flow of the river as measured at Déhané in m³/s:

View chart definition.

== Transport ==
The town of Mbalmayo, which has a railhead, lies on the north bank of this river. The towns of Akonolinga and Abong-Mbang also lie on it.
