= Akoeman =

Coordinates: 3°12′N 11°35′E

- Commune and town
- Interactive map of Akoeman
- Country: Cameroon
- Region: Centre
- Department: Nyong-et-So'o

Population (2005)
  - Total: 5,397
- Time zone: UTC+1 (WAT)

Akoeman is a town and commune in the Nyong-et-So'o department, Centre Region of Cameroon. As of 2005 census, it had a population of 5,397.

== See also ==
- Communes of Cameroon
