= Mengueme =

Coordinates: 3°15′N 11°24′E

- Commune and town
- Interactive map of Mengueme
- Country: Cameroon
- Time zone: UTC+1 (WAT)

Mengueme is a town and commune in Cameroon.

== See also ==
- Communes of Cameroon
