= Beti people =

Central African ethnic group of Cameroon and Equatorial Guinea

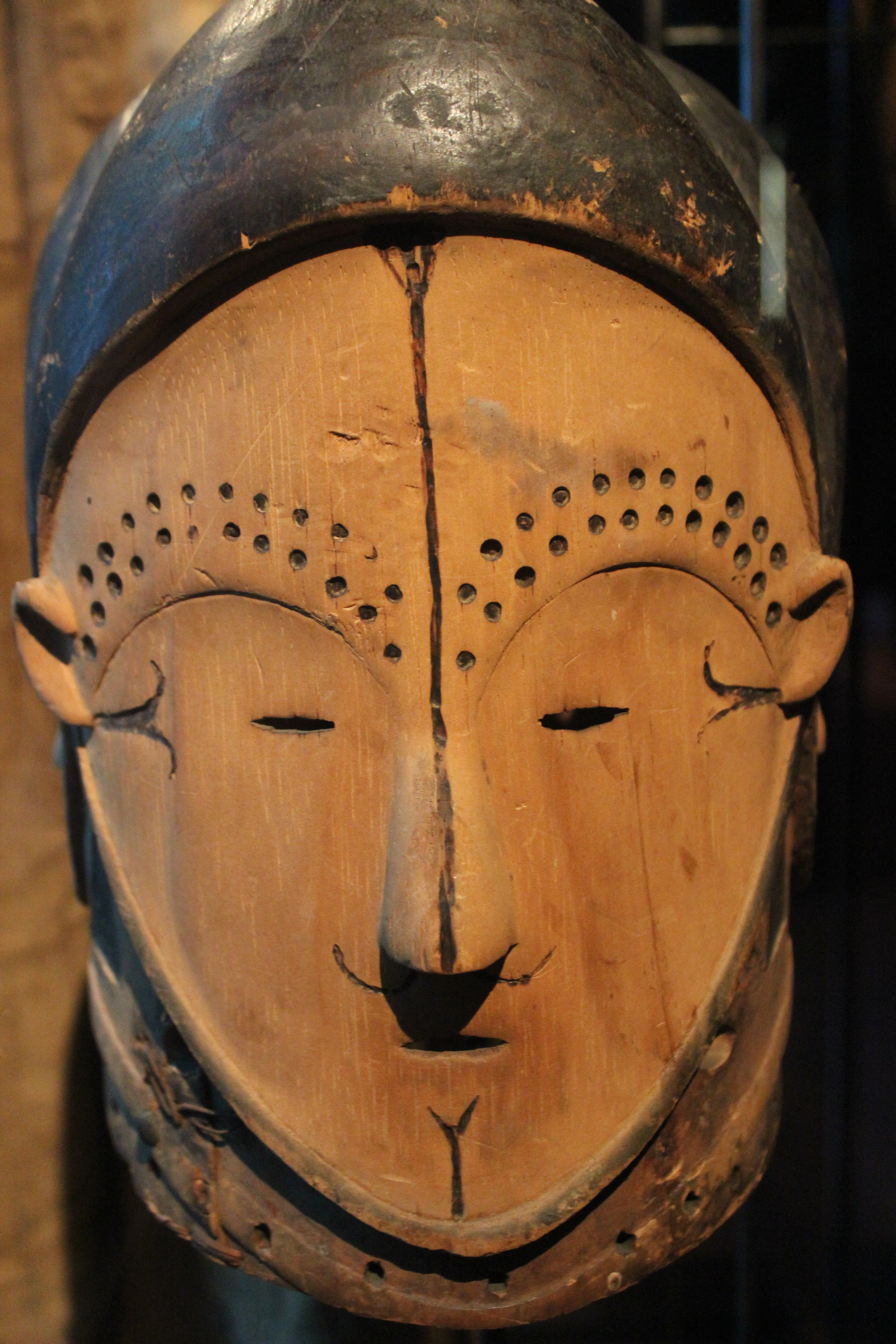
- A wooden mask of the Beti people

Total population
- ≈1 million

Regions with significant populations
- Cameroon; Equatorial Guinea

Languages
- Beti languages, French, Spanish, Portuguese

Religion
- Christianity, some syncretic with Traditional religion

Related ethnic groups
- Fang people, other Beti-Pahuin peoples

The Beti people are a Central African ethnic group primarily found in central Cameroon. They are also found in Equatorial Guinea. They are closely related to the Fang and other Beti-Pahuin peoples, who are all sometimes grouped as Ekang.

The Beti are found in northern regions of their joint demographic distributions, the Fang in the southern regions, and others in between. Estimates of the total Beti population vary, with many sources placing them at over three million spread from the Atlantic coastal regions near Equatorial Guinea into the hilly, equatorial forest covered highlands of central Africa reaching into the Congo.

== Language ==
The Beti people, like the other Beti-Pahuin peoples speak a dialect of the Fang language, also known as Pahuin or Pangwe. Sometimes called as the Beti language, it is a Southern Bantu language belonging to the Niger-Congo family of languages.

The Beti language is sub-classified as Bulu language, Eton language, Ewondo language and Fang language because though different, they are mutually intelligible to respective speakers. While the languages are similar, there are linguistic differences suggesting a complex interaction between these peoples.

== History ==
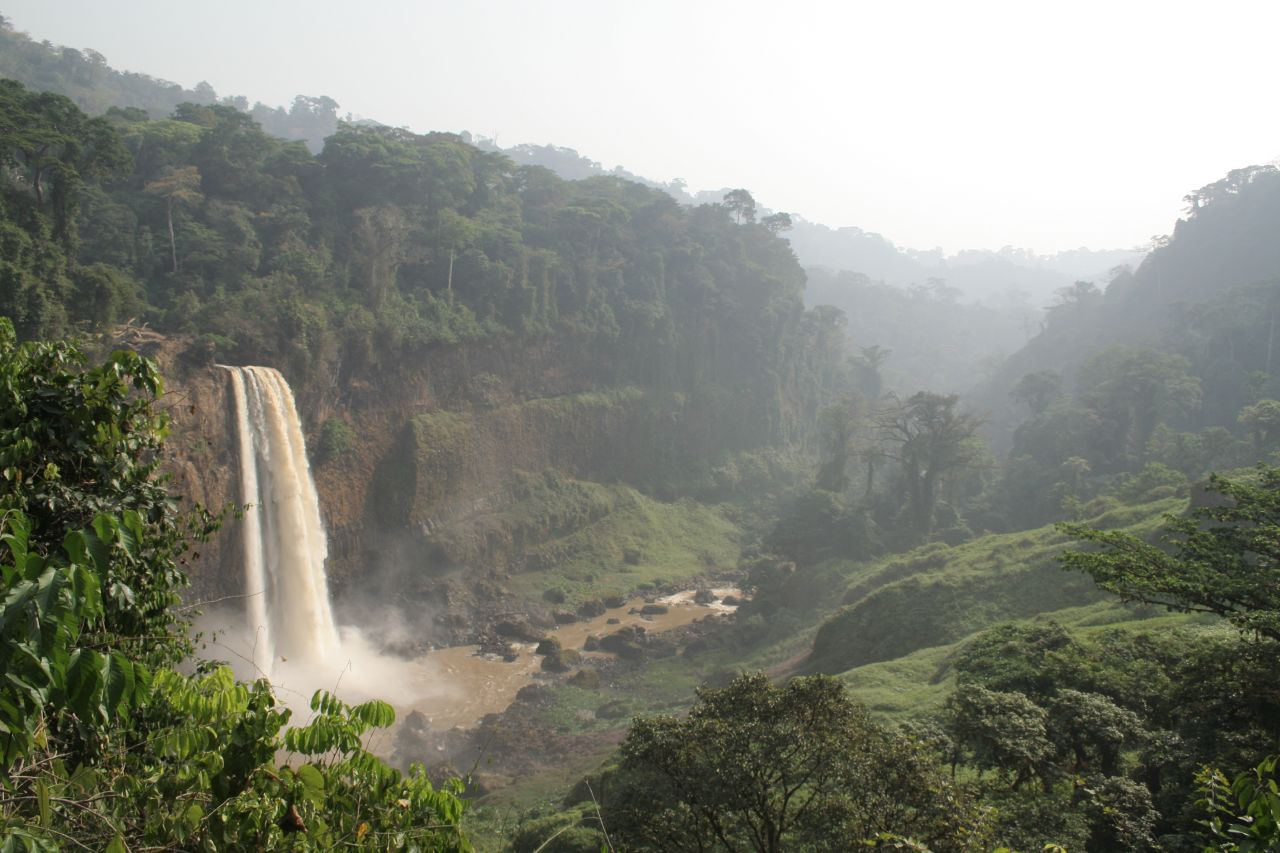
The Beti people migrated south and west from the Sanaga River basin into equatorial forests regions.

The Beti people are Bantu people who once lived in northern parts of Central Africa, with a complex, undocumented and debated prehistory. They likely moved into equatorial Africa in the seventh or eighth century, then further southwest in central Cameroon between the seventeenth and nineteenth centuries, likely after waves of wars and slave raids from the Fulani people. They were also a targeted source for slaves and ivory by the Hausa people.

Their initial migration in the 17th century was from highlands and forested regions east of the Sanaga River towards south and west. They continued to face jihads and violence from the north by the Fulani people (also called Fulbe or Fula people), abandoned their settlements and migrated further into southern parts of central Cameroon till the 19th century when European traders and colonial forces intervened as they sought trade and markets. The first European power to create a colony that partly included the lands of the Beti people was the German Kamerun colony in 1884. After the first world war, the German colony was taken over, divided by the French and the British colonial powers.

=== Allegations of cannibalism ===
In 1856, Paul Du Chaillu met the Beti people. He published a memoir about them in 1863. The memoir mentions his arrival on the Atlantic coast and being told by local people about the cannibalistic Beti people. When Du Chaillu met the Beti people, he saw skulls and bones near their settlement. He immediately took these for cannibalism and wrote about it in his memoir. Later visitors such as the ethnographer Mary Kingsley in 1893–1895, who did not speak the Beti language or live with the local people, saw the same sighting, and titled her book "A Victorian Woman Explorer among the Man-eaters".

In 1912, a Christian missionary named Father Trilles visited them, learned the Beti language, and wrote a more objective ethnographic account of the Beti people. More accounts about the Beti people began appearing after World War I, but were often stereotypical and most emphasized about their alleged practice of containing bone relics in reliquary boxes. These alleged practices were used to justify violence against them and the enslavement of Beti and Fang peoples. When their villages were raided, thousands of their wooden idols and villages were burnt by the slave raiders. The French and the British colonial officials suppressed these practices.

As scholarship about the Beti people grew in the 1900s, according to John Shoup, the collected evidence suggests that the early rumors and allegations of cannibalism were wrong. The Beti people were not cannibalistic, the skulls and bones in the open and in the reliquary boxes were actually of their ancestors. The practice of collecting the bones were a way of remembrance and religious reverence for their dead.

== In Fiction ==
=== The Tarzan story ===
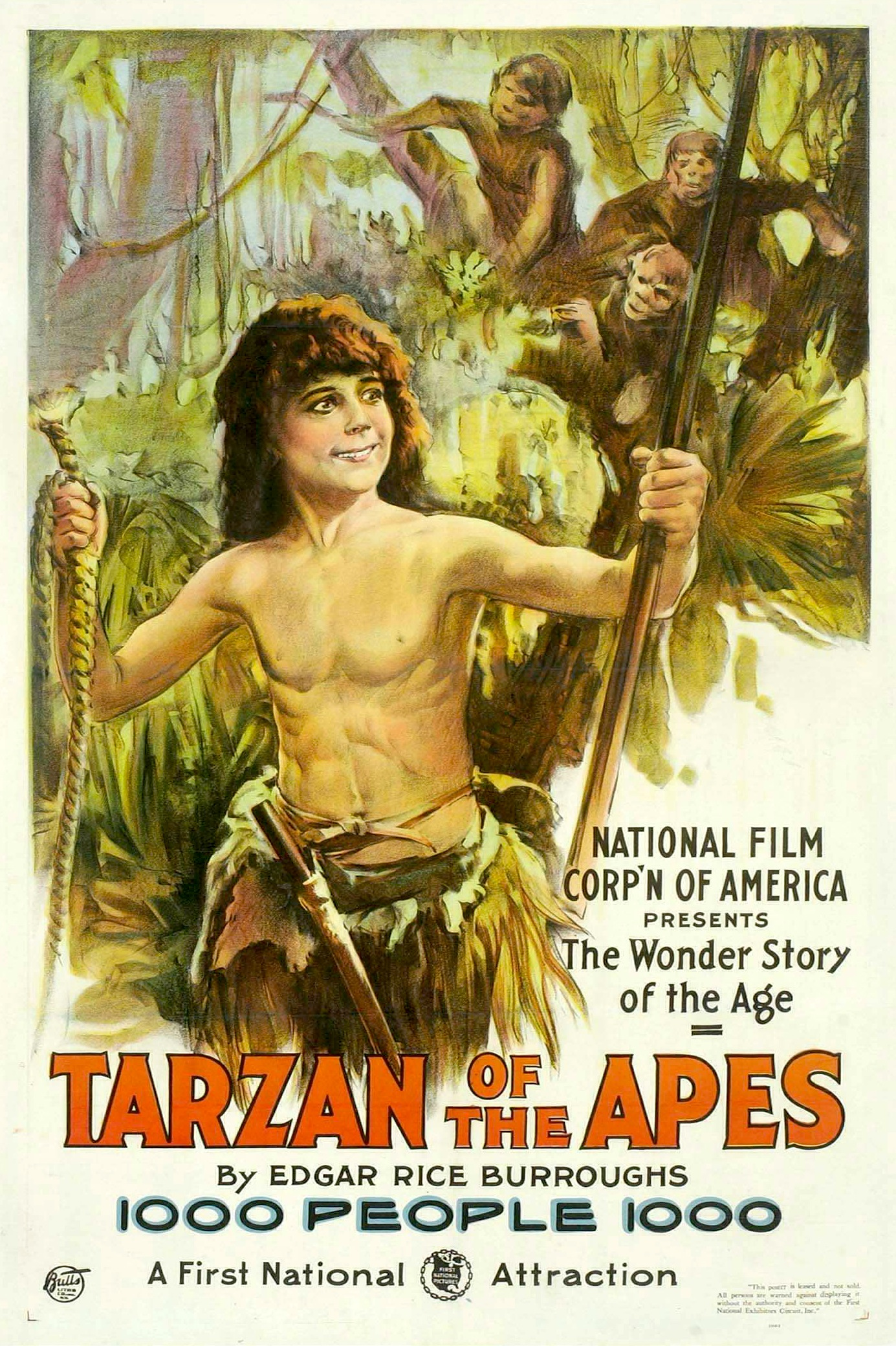
The Tarzan character (1918) was set among the Beti people of equatorial central Africa.

The initial reports of alleged cannibalism attracted widespread attention, supported the oft-stereotyped and presumed African barbarianism, then became a part of fiction and popular literature at the turn of the 20th century. Among the most famous was the novel Tarzan of the Apes by Edgar Rice Burroughs, which created the popular Tarzan character. Burroughs set his novel near the village of Mbonga, among the Beti people and their closely related ethnic group called the Fang people.

The initial Tarzan story, where infant John is discovered by apes and raised by a female ape, built on the colonial era stereotype of cannibalistic Africans in the equatorial forests. The story, states Shoup, provided a contrast of "pure uncorrupted" noble Tarzan in the midst of a barbaric cannibalistic society. The Tarzan syndicate became a global sensation, was widely followed, created some 89 movies in the 100 years that followed, and launched numerous comic strips and television series, many of which providing a distorted stereotyped view about the people from the African equatorial forest.

== Ethnography ==
The traditional occupation of the Beti people is farming, particularly of yams, cassava, corn and plantains as staples. Since colonial times, many have adopted cash crops such as peanuts and cacao. They are skilled artists and craftsmen, particularly in iron and wood handicrafts. However, these craftsmanship are nearly extinct because of urbanization and modern trade flows.

The traditional Beti society has been organized at the village level, typically with its borders fenced and fortified with watch towers to protect the inhabitants from wild life of the rain forests and intruders. Outside the village compounds were carefully concealed traps, as another line of defense against slave raiders. The villages have tended to be politically independent of each other, centered on a lineage called Ayon or Mvog. They are a patrilineal people, and disputes are typically settled by a due process led by a headman. The Beti revere their ancestors, and known among other things for their artistically produced reliquary boxes called the Byeri. They store the bones of their ancestors in these reliquary boxes, which were used during rites of passage, with their sophisticated masks called So (animal-faced) and Ngil (human-faced).

The Beti people practise double exogamy, that is typically married away from both father's and mother's lineages. Another notable aspect of their society has been the concept of Mebala, a type of potlatch, where wealthy families ceremoniously gather and give away their wealth to the poorer families.

== See also ==
- Mongo Beti, a descendant of the Beti people, among the most well known Cameroon novelists
