= Ewondo Populaire =

Beti-based pidgin of Cameroon

- Pidgin Beti
- Native to: Cameroon
- Region: Yaounde
- Native speakers: None
- Language family: Beti-based pidgin

Language codes
- ISO 639-3: –
- Glottolog: ewon1240
- Guthrie code: A.70A

Ewondo Populaire, also known as Pidgin A70, is a Beti-based pidgin of Cameroon, spoken in the area of the capital Yaoundé.

== See also ==
- Ewondo language – Bantu language spoken in Cameroon
