= Beti languages =

Bantu dialect continuum of Central Africa

Beti
- Yaunde
- Native to: Cameroon
- Ethnicity: Beti peoples
- Native speakers: (2.8 million cited 1982–2013)
- Language family: Niger–Congo?: Atlantic–Congo; Volta-Congo; Benue–Congo; Bantoid; Southern Bantoid; Bantu (Zone A); Beti
- Dialects: Eton; Ewondo; Mengisa

Language codes
- ISO 639-3: (btb deprecated in 2010 as spurious)
- Glottolog: yaun1239

Beti is a group of Bantu languages, spoken by the Beti peoples who inhabit the rain forest regions of Cameroon. The varieties, which are largely mutually intelligible and variously considered dialects or closely related languages, are:

- Ewondo
- Eton
- Mengisa
- Fang

Beti had an ISO 639-3 code, but it was retired in 2010 because the varieties of Beti already had their own codes.

There is a Beti-based pidgin called Ewondo Populaire.
