= Adamawa Emirate =

Islamic state in West and Central Africa (1809–1903)

Coordinates: 9°13′48″N 12°27′36″E

Adamawa Emirate: Laamorde Adamaawa (Fula); 𞤂𞤢𞥄𞤥𞤢𞤼𞤫𞥅𞤪𞤭 𞤀𞤣𞤢𞤥𞤢𞥄𞤱𞤢; إمارة آدماوة
- Flag

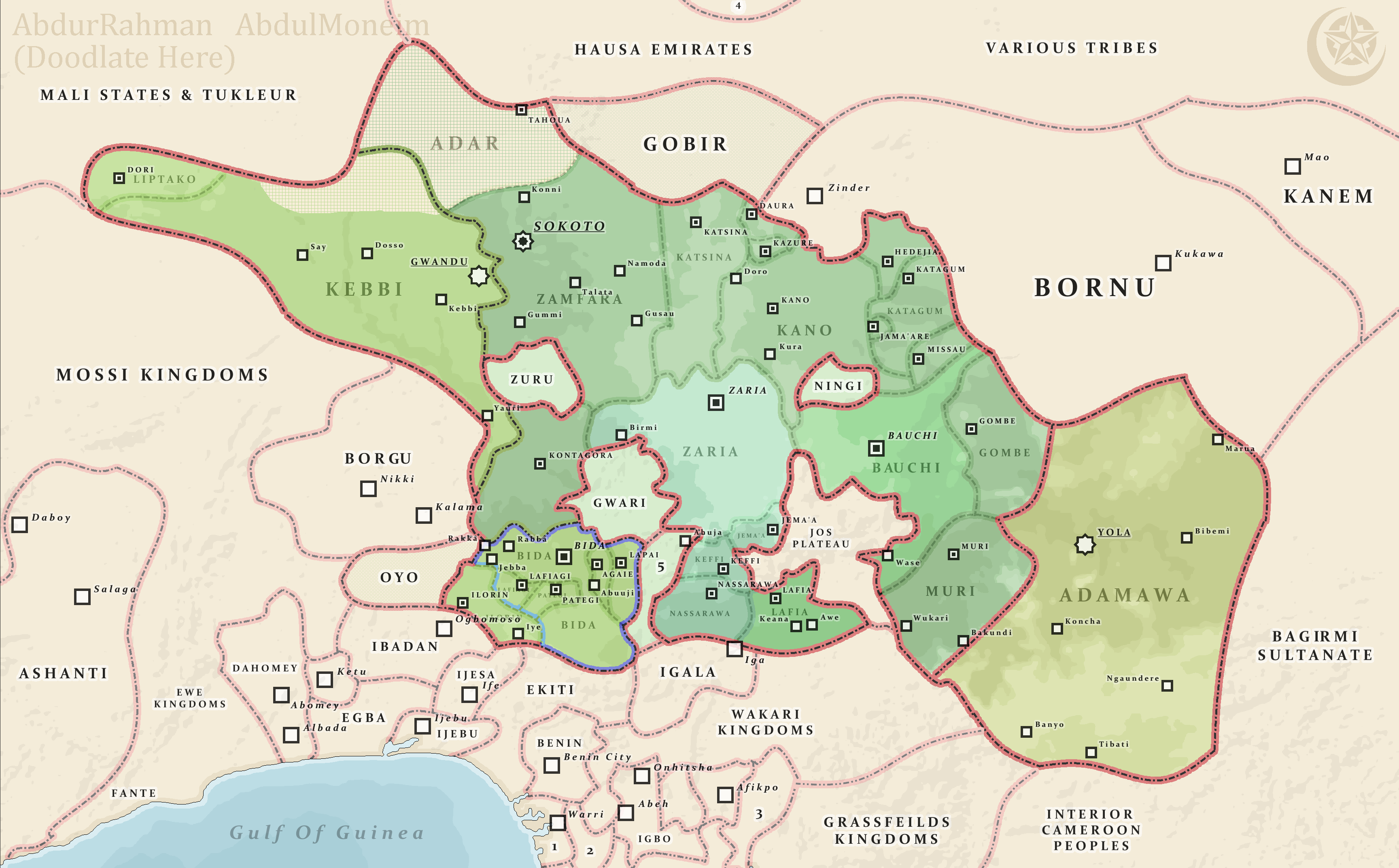
- Adamawa Emirate (right) in the orbit of the Sokoto Caliphate
- Status: Vassal of the Sokoto Caliphate (1809–1903); Currently non-sovereign monarchy within Nigeria
- Capital: Gurin (1809–1831); Ribadu (1831–1839); Njoboliyo (1839–1841); Yola (1841)
- Religion: Sunni Islam
- Government: Emirate
- Lamido/Emir
  - 1809–1847: Modibbo Adama (first)
  - 1890–1901: Zubeiru (last sovereign)
  - 2010–present: Muhammadu Barkindo
- Legislature: Adamawa Emirate Council

Establishment
  - Vassal of the Sokoto Caliphate: 1807
  - Native Authority under British colonial rule: 1903
  - Native Authority within the Nigerian First Republic: 1960
  - Non-sovereign monarchy in Nigeria: 1966

Area
  - Total: 40,000 sq mi (100,000 km^{2})
- Today part of: Cameroon; Central African Republic; Adamawa State, Nigeria

The Adamawa Emirate (Fula: Laamorde Adamaawa, 𞤂𞤢𞥄𞤥𞤢𞤼𞤫𞥅𞤪𞤭 𞤀𞤣𞤢𞤥𞤢𞥄𞤱𞤢; Arabic: إمارة آدماوة, romanized: ʾimārat·u ʾādamāwah; German: Adamaua; French: Adamaoua) is a traditional state located in Fombina, an area which now roughly corresponds to areas of Adamawa State and Taraba state in Nigeria, and previously also in the three northern regions of Cameroon (Far North, North, and Adamawa), including minor Parts of Chad and the Central African Republic.

Modibo Adama was a commander of Sheikh Usman dan Fodio, the man who began the Fulani jihad in 1809. The capital was moved several times until it settled in Yola, Nigeria on the banks of the Benue River in Nigeria around 1841. At the time of Adama's death his realm encompassed parts of modern Nigeria and much of north Cameroon. Much like the other emirates in the Sokoto Caliphate, Adamawa enjoyed considerable autonomy but it had to pay a tribute to the Sultan in Sokoto.

== Toponym ==
The name Adamawa derives from the name of the founder of the emirate, Adama bii Ardo Hassan. The suffix -wa is appended in the Hausa language to signify the collective identity of 'people of' that place, so, Adamawa means "the people of Adama".

Fombina means 'southlands' indicating the area south of Bornu and Sokoto. It was the earliest name for the emirate with 'Adamawa' only coming to use much later. The earliest recorded use of 'Adamawa' was in Denham's and Clapperton's 1826 journal Narrative of Travels and Discoveries in Northern and Central Africa.

The Palace and Emirate Council today are called ‘Fombina Palace’ and ‘Fombina Emirate Council’ respectively. The present Lamido Adamawa, Lamido Muhammadu Barkindo, "strongly prefers" to be addressed as 'Lamido Fombina' with 'Adamawa' in bracket.

== Geography ==
The nineteenth century Adamawa emirate lay south of Lake Chad, and east of Hausaland, within latitudes 6° and 11° North, and longitudes 10° and 14° East. The external limits are hard to fix in exact terms, because it is difficult to distinguish between people who the Fulani subjected to their rule, and those whom they simply raided for slaves, without establishing any form of administrative links. According to some estimates, by the late 19th century, slaves constituted about 50% of the population of the Fulɓe-ruled Adamawa Emirate, where they were referred to as jeyaɓe (singular jeyado). Based on the region subjected to Fulani rule, the emirate stretched from areas south of the Adamawa plateau near Tibati, in the South, to the Diamare, in the north, from the slopes of the Bamenda-Adamawa-Mandara Highlands in the west, to Baya, Laka, Mundang and Musgum country in the east. Early British administrators reporting from Yola, put the surface area of Adamawa at between 35,000 and 40,000 square miles or between 90,650 and 103,600 square kilometers. As a result of European treaties in 1893 and 1894, parts of the Emirate can today be found in Chad, the Central African Republic, Nigeria and Cameroon, which retained about three-quarter of the total area of the emirate.

The altitude of much of the country lies at around 2,000 ft (610 m) above sea level. The Adamawa plateau itself however, called the Leydi Hossere by the Fulbe, rises to a general elevation of 4,000 ft (1,200 m), and forms the watershed, from which streams of water drain into the Benue river system, as well as into the inland basin of Lake Chad. Great altitudes of between 5,000 and 7,000 ft or between 1,525 and 2,150 meters above sea level are found, towards the western border region of the emirate with other regions of Nigeria and Cameroon, these are sections of the Cameroon-Bamenda-Adamawa-Mandara highland range which have record heights of about 13,350 ft (4,070 m) above sea level near the coast and steadily decreases northwards, to just around 4,000 ft (1,200 m) near Yola, the emirate's capital city. North of Yola, these range of highlands is continued by the Mandara Mountains at over 6,000 ft (1,800 m), before finally tapering out around Balma, into the lake chad basin. The southern regions of the emirate is characterized by thin forest of broad leaved savannah woodland or orchard vegetation type. The country becomes more and more of open grasslands towards the north. The vegetation was a strong inducement to Fulani settlement in Adamawa, and during the jihad, it offered no serious obstacle to the extension of military power based on cavalry.

== History ==
=== Rise ===
==== Pre-jihad ====
The earliest reference of Fulbe around the area of the Adamawa region was in the Kanem-Bornu empire when they came as envoys of the emperor of Mali during the 13th century. A century later, more Fulbe migrated to Hausaland especially to Kano during the reign of Yakubu. These Fulani settlers brought many books on Islamic thought and Law from Mali. Some others continued further east to Bornu and settled there. There was a steady flow of Fulbe immigrants to this region and by the 16th-century there were considerable number of them in Hausaland, Bornu, Bagirmi and among the Jukun in Kwararafa.

===== Fulbe Under Bornu =====
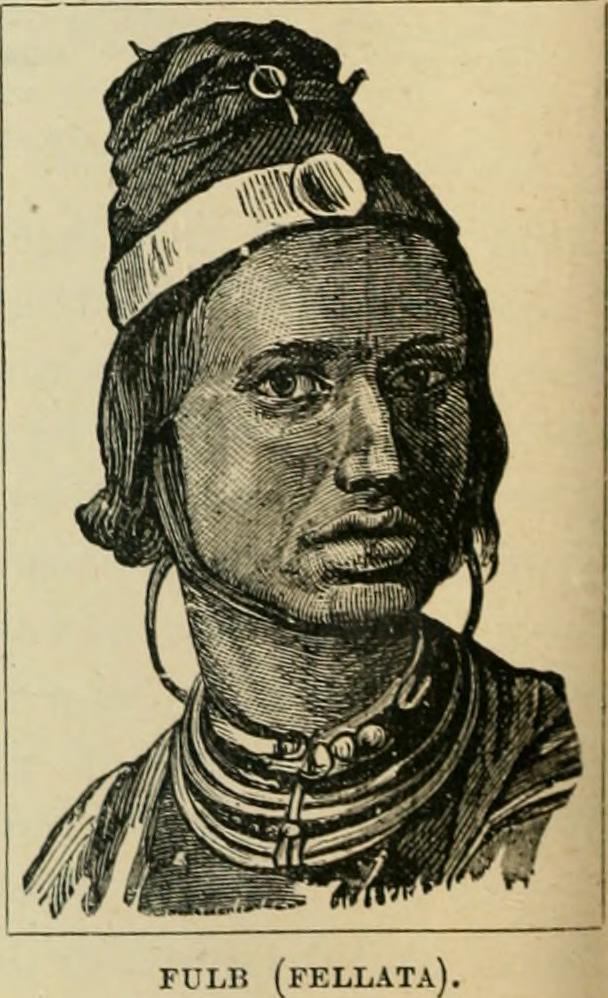
A Fulani from the Sokoto Caliphate

The Fulbe became known for their learning and understanding of Islam. The Bornu king, Mai Dunama ibn Hajj Ali (1476–1503), gave official recognition to their contribution to the Muslim community in Bornu. He conferred upon an Ardo (Fulani chief) and removed the requirement for him and all the Fulbe he led to pay taxes. All the subsequent Mais (or kings) of Bornu honoured this arrangement throughout the 16th and 17th centuries. It was not unusual to find the Bornu kings going to war on other groups to protect the Fulbe from raids during this period. This Fulbe, in turn, continued teaching and joining the army to fight for Bornu. At the turn of the 18th-century however, perhaps due to their political ambition, Fulani people lost the support of the Bornu aristocracy. Mai Hamdan ibn Dunama failed to honour the tax agreement and the Fulbe were openly harassed in the kingdom. Due to this and other factors like famine and the general decline of the Kanem-Bornu empire, many Fulbe decided to find new homes elsewhere which led to many to migrate to Hausaland and the Adamawa region.

===== Migrations into Adamawa =====
The early Fulbe settlers in the Adamawa region were not driven by religious zeal or intention to conquer or dominate. Because these early Fulbe were not warlike, the migrations into this region, like earlier in the other regions, were peaceful. As a French colonial administrator, M. Masson puts it:

Since the fifteenth century, they had introduced themselves into the country in the most harmless manner, soliciting permission from the natives of the soil to graze and water their flock. Attracted by the rich pastures, several of the heads of the families settled in these territories as customers of the local populations.

They generally avoided conflicts and built relationships with the local populations sometimes through inter-marriages. Trade also helped improve these relationships as the local communities provided supplies like honey, fish and grain and in turn the Fulani provided milk, meat, butter and hide. It was tasked on the Ardo to facilitate building of relationships with the local populations. Herder-farmer conflicts inevitably occurred, but these cases were typically resolved on an individual level between the farmers and herders involved. The Ardo would usually cooperate with local authorities to handle such cases, if necessary.

In some communities, particularly the Bata, the Fulbe settlers were required to adhere to jus primae noctis. In order to live in peace in these areas, some Fulani groups agreed to this arrangement. Many of the families however, evaded the custom by paying a bull or two to the chief as a substitute. In most cases, when certain conditions or practices were enforced on the Fulbe, they left the area to find a more suitable place (like in Bornu) but in this case, in the Benue regions, the conditions were too favourable for permanent settlements.

The rich Fulani families did not worry having to pay to avoid the jus primae noctis but the problem came from how the payments were collected. The chief would send his collectors to the father of the girl or the head of the family when he thinks he would not receive enough from the Ardo. He would then proceed to select the required number of cattle usually picking out the best cattle. At around 1803, this practice caused a conflict. One Ardo Njobbo of the Ba'an (a Fulani clan), refused to make the payment or surrender his daughter to a local prince. The prince then proceeded to pick out a cattle from the Ardo's herd. Njobbo then ordered his men to kill the prince which led to a violent conflict between local Fulbe and Bata groups. This fight is said to have led to the death of Modibbo Adama's father, Modibbo Hassana.

==== Adama's Jihad and establishment of Fombina ====
The jihad in the region later called Adamawa was an offshoot of Uthman dan Fodio's jihad in Hausaland. Uthman's jihad started in February 1804 with the hijra from Degel to Gudu and later declaration of jihad against Yunfa, Sarkin Gobir. Despite the jihad battles ongoing in the north and west of Adamawa by Buba Yero and Uthman's other flag-bearers particularly in Uba, Bazza and Kanem-Bornu, the Fulbe of Adamawa were not interested until five years later in 1809.

===== Justifications for Jihad =====
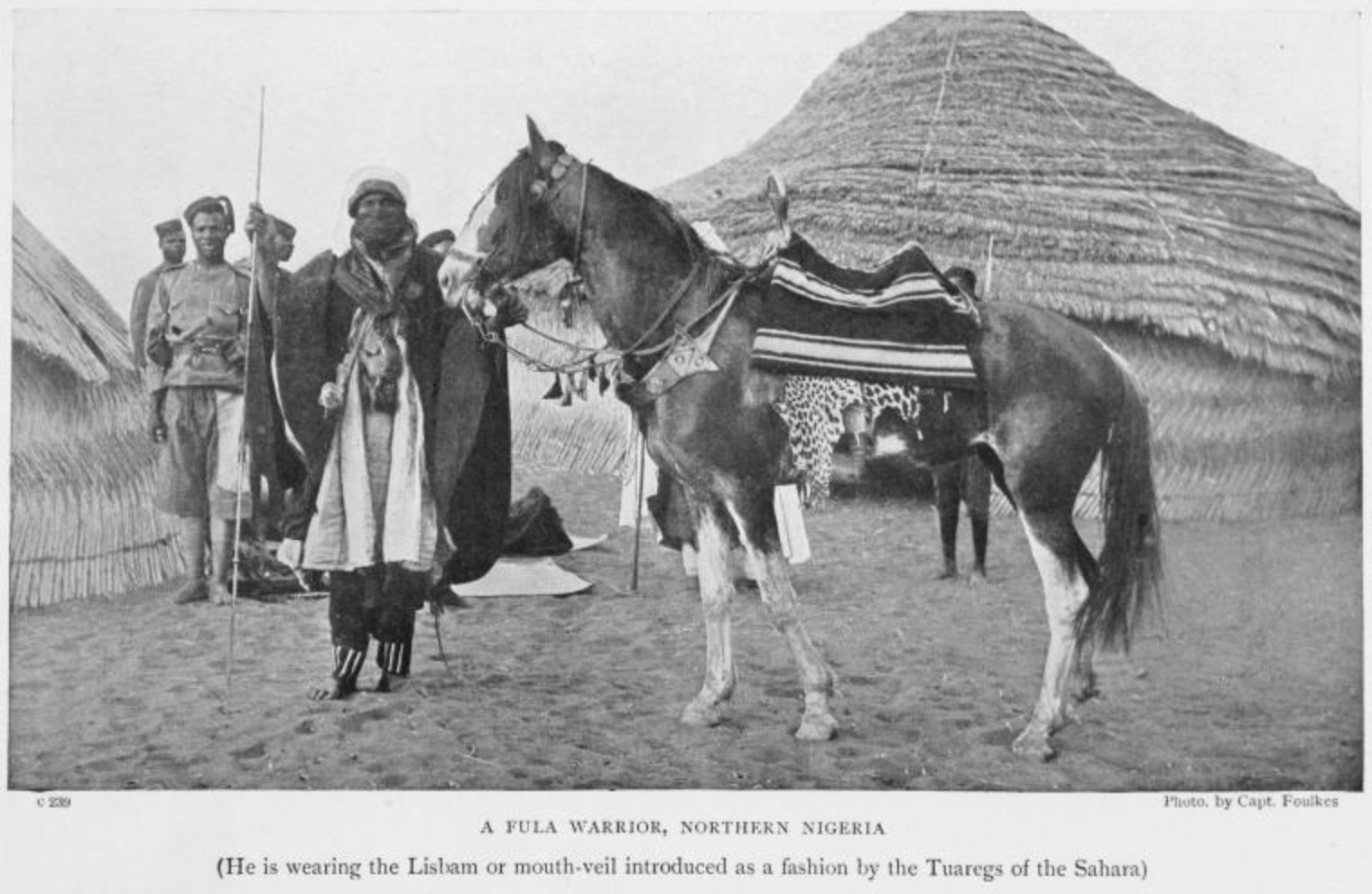
A Fulani warrior (1912)

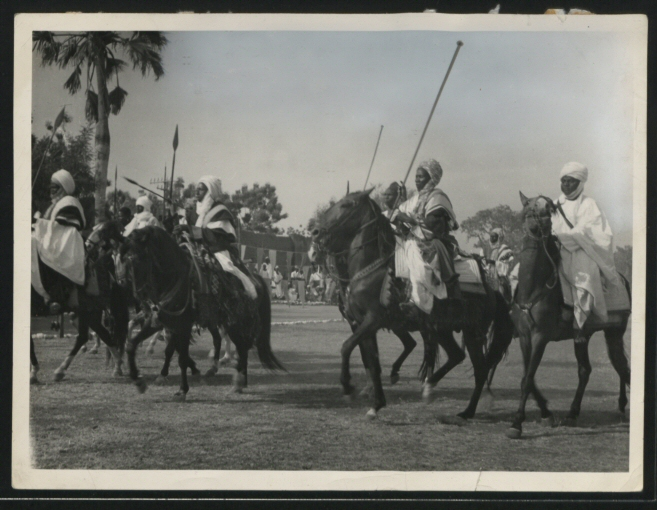
Horsemen in Yola (1955)

News about the jihad eventually reached Adamawa through the activities of Buba Yero of Gombe. Some Muslim Ardo'en held a meeting in Gurin to reach a decision on how to approach the situation. Unlike Uthman in Gobir, the Adamawa jihad was not found on self-defence. The Muslims of the Adamawa region were not prohibited from practicing Islam. They did not engage in any major conflicts with the local populations. The region was highly diverse ethnically, linguistically, and religiously. Even the Adamawa Fulani Muslims were not highly knowledgeable about the religion, and even today, the Mbororo are not Muslims. Out of the four instances in which Uthman stated that jihad could be carried out against a people to establish a new government, only two applied to the Muslims of Adamawa:

(xii) And that to make war upon the heathen king who will not say 'There is no God but Allah' is obligatory by assent, and that to take the government from him is obligatory by assent; (xiii) And that to make war upon the heathen king who does not say 'There is no God but Allah' on account of the custom of his town (bi-sabab 'urfi'l-baladi), and who makes no profession of Islam, is (also obligatory by assent; and that to take the government from him is obligatory by assent;

They reached an agreement to send a delegation to Uthman in Sokoto to get advice on their situation and get legitimacy if he decides they were eligible to launch the jihad. They appointed Modibbo Adama, a learned teacher who was familiar with Sokoto, as the leader of the delegation. The delegation reached the Shehu after months of travel and presented him with their message. After reviewing the situation, Uthman instructed them to launch the jihad in Fombina ('southlands of Sokoto and Bornu'). Furthermore, he chose Adama as the leader, appointing him Lamido Fombina. The reason for Uthman's decision to pick Adama, according to a manuscript dated March 1809 in Yola, was:

...since you tell me that some of the fulani leaders did not come with you, but they sent you to come and receive the flag of the jihad from me and take it back to them. I instruct you to tell them that it is you to whom I have given this jihad flag, and tell them that who ever obeys you obeys me, and whoever swears fealty to you, it is exactly as if he had sworn fealty to me.

Another version states:

When you return tell them this is what Shaihu gave you. Say also that I accept their greetings. Bid them place their hands in yours; whoever gives his hand to you, joins hands with me. Tell them I greet them. Make flags for them like this that I have given you, give them the flags, with the orders I have laid upon you. You are the envoy; whatsoever they desire let them tell it you, then do you come and tell me.

===== Reactions to Uthman's directive =====
Modibbo Adama bin Hassana was the son of an Ardo named Modibbo Hassana. Early in his life he left his relatives and clan in Adamawa to attain knowledge. His pursuit led him to Bornu where he studied under a renowned Mallam (Islamic teacher) called Kiari. He was there for many years learning and teaching Islam. After his study in Bornu, Adama returned to his people in Adamawa who were now settled in Gurin, a new settlement they established a few years back. During his time in Bornu, it is theorised that Adama heard about the jihad in Sokoto and most likely came back to inform his people back in Adamawa. Adama stayed in Gurin for some time, teaching the Fulbe Muslims in the community, until the meeting regarding the jihad took place.

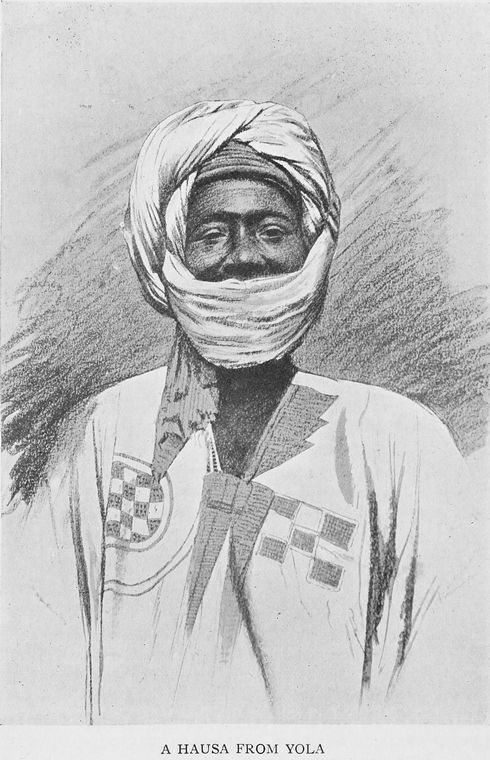
A Hausa man from Yola (1902)

The reactions to Uthman's decision to pick Adama as the leader shocked the Fulbe of Adamawa especially the Ardo'en who felt that he was not worthy of such an appointment. Adama had very humble beginnings. His father was an ordinary Mallam. Adama lacked wealth and prestige. He was no warrior owing to his lean and tall stature. His only qualification was his knowledge of Islam and ability to explain concepts clearly. He was a fairly popular teacher in his community with even receiving a license to teach (Ijazas) from his Mallam, Kiari of Kukawa. Adama was also described as "an honest man, God fearing and unambitious for possessions". These qualities likely influenced the Ardo'en to choose him as the leader of the delegation that was sent to Sokoto. They probably thought that a man with such humble origins would not be chosen to lead the jihad. However, to Uthman, these qualities made him the ideal leader for such a cause. These qualities also made Adama trustworthy in Uthman's eyes, which was an important quality to him as he expected reports from Adama regarding the jihad and affairs of his new emirate.

On Adama's arrival to Gurin, he was eagerly welcomed with many people waiting to receive Uthman's message and directive. As he relayed the message and informed them on his appointment as 'Lamido of Fombina', his audience started reacting differently with even one Ardo Gamawa loudly proclaiming "This is too much. A wife called Adama, a son called Adamu; And is my chief to be Adamu too? But you have forestalled us". Despite the initial mixed reactions to this news, most of the Fulbe Muslims, and later other Muslims, of Adamawa eventually rallied behind Modibbo Adama, who preferred to be referred to as Modibbo Adama rather than Lamido Adama.

===== Beginning of the Jihad =====
The cavalry of the Muslims were highly effective against their adversaries. There is no record of horses being used in the Adamawa region by non-Fulanis before the jihad. Unlike in Mandara and Bornu where they could be found in large numbers, horses were very scarce in Adamawa and were sometimes used for sports and ceremonies. Donkeys, on the other hand, were widely used as beasts of burden. They were cheaper and plentiful which led to their popularity. It was through their experience riding Donkeys that Fulbe from less affluent families could ride horses so effectively. Horses, weapons and armour were provided from Hausaland to the jihadists in Adamawa. They also provided military training and support. Despite their few numbers, the Adamawa Muslims were able to be successful in their jihad mostly because of the decentralised organisation of the non-Muslims in the region. Non-Muslim ethnic groups were dispersed and lacked the unity the Muslims jihadists had. The organised non-Muslim ethnic groups like the Mandara proved to be tough adversaries for the jihad.

Modibbo Adama's first priority was to strengthen this unity. He appealed to the Fulbe Ardo'en to drop differences and inter-clan conflicts and to unite as Muslims. Adama preached to non-Muslim leaders and their people to convert to Islam and join the new Muslim confederation where there would not be discrimination based on race or ethnic background. Many non-Muslims converted to Islam and joined the jihad cause because of Adama's pleading. The Batta of Zummo, Malabu and Holna in particular, embraced Islam and joined the Muslim force at Gurin. By 1810–1811, a considerable number of recent converts and refugees from Bornu, many of whom were Fulbe and Shuwa Arabs, were part of the jihad Army in Adamawa. Uthman dan Fodio ordered Adama not to engage in war with the Batta and Verre:

I enjoin you not to conquer the pagans of the Batta end Verre or enslave their children. Because even if they oppress you, you are forbidden to retaliate in force and recover by force what they seized from you. But if God grants you victory over then you must let them live their own lives and not disperse them completely, and if they ask for peace you should agree.

Many Fulbe lived among the Batta people. The Batta had large numbers and were well organised socially and politically. They were seen as a formidable force. They were experienced and fierce fighters who were also effective in archery with their utilisation of poison arrows. The Batta were separated into many groups and clans but the Fulbe Muslims feared that they would unite under one force to fight them. This can lead to a long war introducing constant instability in the emirate.

The Verre had fewer numbers than the Batta. They were not as organised and generally avoided wars. They have been forced to flee from their original settlements by Batta and Jukun forces. They resettled in the Verre hills in the 18th century. The Verre welcomed Fulani pastoralists, particularly from the Ba'en clan, after they were also forced to flee by the Batta. These two groups regularly came together to defend against raids from the Batta. It was in the interest of the Fulbe to maintain this relationship during the jihad. The Verre also had a large supply of iron and were valuable smiths who skillfully made arrow heads, knives, hoes, and spears.

===== War against the Kingdom of Mandara =====
The Mandara kingdom, along with the Bornu empire, was one of the most significant and well-organized states in the region. It held considerable power and influence, with its capital at Dulo, and controlled extensive territories. The Mandara kingdom had a history of conflicts with Bornu, and these clashes played a crucial role in shaping their relationship. Notably, Mandara was the sole Muslim state located south of Bornu, and it embraced Islam in the early 18th century, during the reign of Mai Bukar al-Hajj. Adama's jihad against Mandara held immense importance in the overall jihad efforts, and this conflict later became a central feature in Adama's campaigns north of the Benue River.

===== Dulo campaign =====
In the latter part of 1810, Adama assembled a sizable army and embarked on a campaign towards Mandara due to ongoing reports of Mandara's hostility towards the Fulani. Travelling through the Tiel River valley, Adama's forces arrived at Guidder. With the assistance of the local Fulbe population, Adama launched an attack against Guidder's chief, Mulli Mali, after he refused to submit and was subsequently killed. Guidder was conquered by Adama's forces. They continued their northward advance, converting numerous villages along the way. However, some villages that resisted surrender sought refuge in difficult-to-reach areas, inaccessible to cavalry. Adama established his camp at Petté, a few miles south of Dulo, the capital of Mandara. From there, he sent a letter to the Mai of Mandara, Bukar Djiama, asserting that Shehu Usman appointed him as Lamido and that Mandara fell under his jurisdiction, requiring the Mai to pay homage. In response, Bukar acknowledged Adama's authority over the Fulani and sent him presents, including a female slave. However, he adamantly refused to compromise his own sovereignty over Mandara.

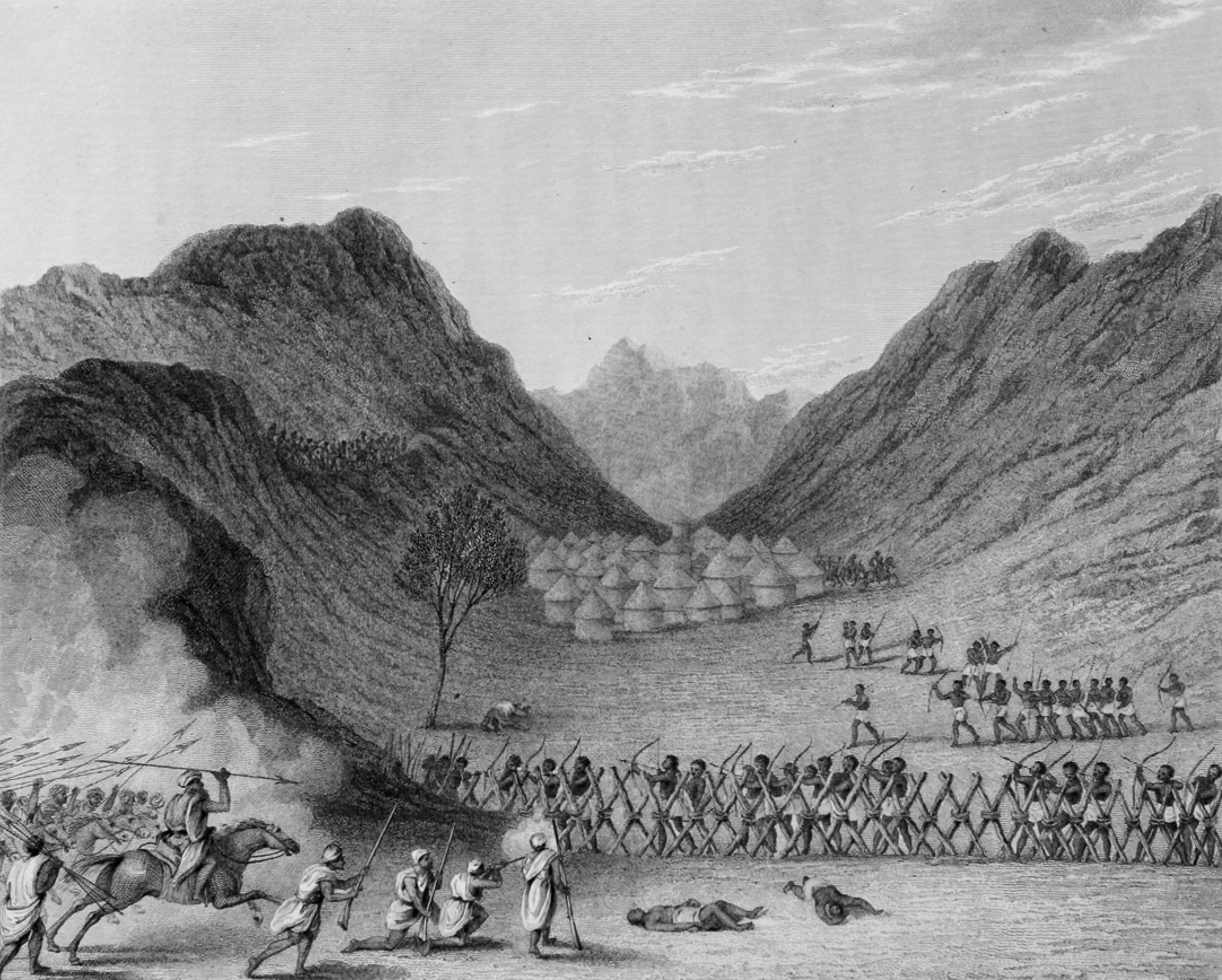
An engraving of the Battle of Mosfei

Afterwards, Adama swiftly moved his forces to Pata, an open field that provided an advantageous setting for his cavalry. The Mandara army attempted to attack Adama's force but was unsuccessful and forced to retreat. Adama pursued them to Dulo, the capital of Mandara, which fell with little resistance. However, Mai Bukar retreated further east to Mora, a location with better defenses against cavalry. Dulo suffered extensive devastation at the hands of Adama's army. Adama then faced challenges in establishing a stable government in the city as most of its able-bodied inhabitants had either perished in battle or fled with Bukar. It became clear that Adama would need to remain in Mandara for an extended period to establish any form of governance. Complicating matters, the behavior of his men made this task difficult as their focus shifted solely to acquiring war spoils, neglecting the defense of the town. Subsequently, the Mandara warriors returned to Dulo, swiftly recaptured it, and pursued the Fulbe forces well beyond the borders of the kingdom.

The deteriorating relationship between Mandara and the Fulani worsened when Mai Bukar initiated raids on Fulani camps within his territory, capturing many Fulani Muslims as slaves. Concurrently, the Fulani settlements in Maroua, Mindif, Guider, and Bogo were solidifying their control over the Diamare region and the Mundang people. Prior to Adama's jihad, Bukar frequently utilized these settlements for slave raids. The increasing influence of the Fulani in the area significantly impacted Bukar's economic and political power. In response to the slave raids, the Fulani constructed defensive outposts fortified with massive barricades, effectively defending against both Mandara and Bornu raiders. Consequently, an alliance formed between Bornu and Mandara against the Fulbe.

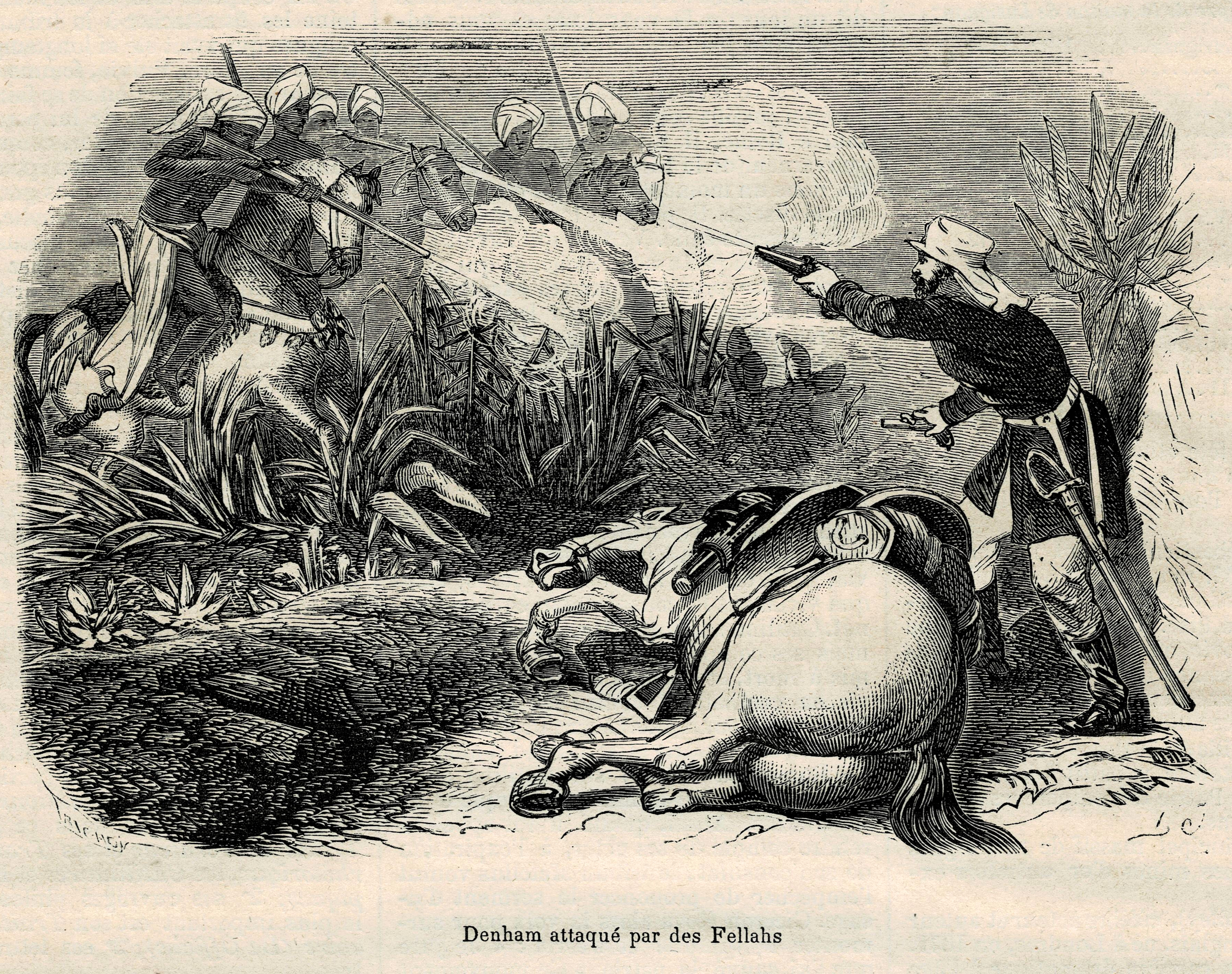
Dixon Denham defending against the Fulani pursuers during the retreat of the Bornu-Mandara army

===== Battle of Mosfei =====
In 1823, a treaty of alliance was signed between Bornu and Mandara. Additionally, Mai Bukar offered his daughter in marriage to the Mai of Bornu, Ibrahim Ahmed. Together, they successfully launched a joint expedition into Musgum, located southwest of Mandara. By the end of 1823, tensions between Mandara and the Fulani reached their peak. The Bornu court received a delegation of well-armed Arabs, presenting an opportunity for another expedition. Bukar proposed targeting two Fulani strongholds: Mosfei and Zuay near Modzgo. The attack was launched after careful planning by Bukar. However, the Fulani forces had entrenched themselves behind high palisade barriers and unleashed a barrage of poisoned arrows on the allied Bornu and Mandara forces. The Fulani defense proved too formidable, forcing the allied forces to retreat. This battle was witnessed by the explorer Dixon Denham, and his firsthand account can be found in Clapperton's journal, Narrative of Travels and Discoveries in Northern and Central Africa.

Following the battle at Mosfei, the Fulani and Mandara entered a period of ongoing conflicts. To strengthen his position, Mai Bukar was compelled to fortify Mora and establish it as his administrative capital. Meanwhile, Dulo became the royal capital, serving as a symbolic center of power akin to Windsor or Versailles, where the Mai resided for parts of the year. Even today, when the Mais of Mandara ascend to the throne, they visit Dulo to don the leopard skin and other symbols associated with Gayae, the legendary founder of the kingdom. During this time, the Fulani gained control over the eastern part of Mandara. Settlements such as Mubi, Moda, Madagali, Michika, Guidder, and others firmly came under Adama's domain, with each having its own lamido.

=== Fall ===
By 1901, the emirates of Bida, Ilorin, Agaye, Lapai and Kontagora had fallen to the British through the Royal Niger Company. The aristocracy of Adamawa were held intense debates on whether to resist the British or submit when they eventually invade the emirate as the military might of the Royal Niger Company was much greater. The party who preferred to resist eventually won the debate. This party was led by the Lamido, Zubairu bin Adama. The other party included the Hamman Joda (the Qadi), Bobbo Ahmadu (the Lamido's younger brother) and Yerima Iyabeno (the Lamido's nephew). Lamido Zubairu's insistence on resistance was influenced by his hatred for the Europeans who divided and plan to further divide his emirate. By 1901, the Germans had already taken his sub-emirate Tibati and had been making moves towards taking the sub-emirates of Ngoundere and Bamnyo. His strong respect for the Sokoto Caliphate and its ideals also influenced his decision to resist. In a letter to Sultan Abdurrahman announcing the fall of Yola to the British, Lamido Zubairu pledged:

I will not be two-faced, on your side and on the side of the Christians too. My allegiance is to you, to God and the Prophet, and after you to the Imam Mahdi. There is no surrender to the unbeliever even after the fall of the strongholds.

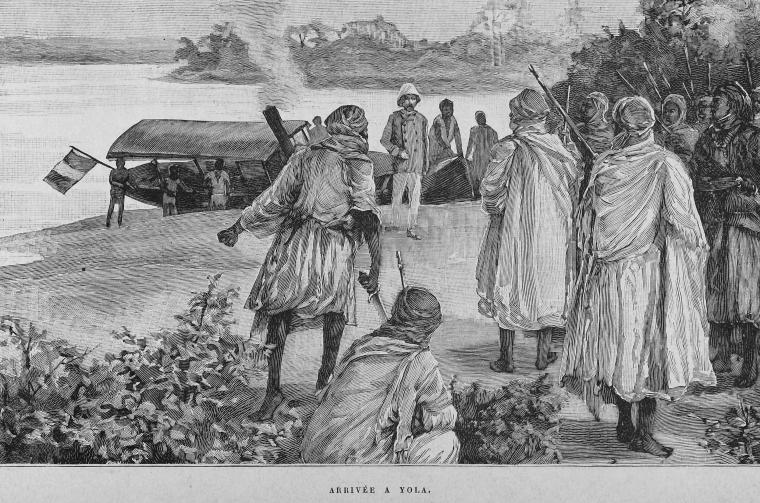
Arrival of Antoine Mizon to Yola (1894)

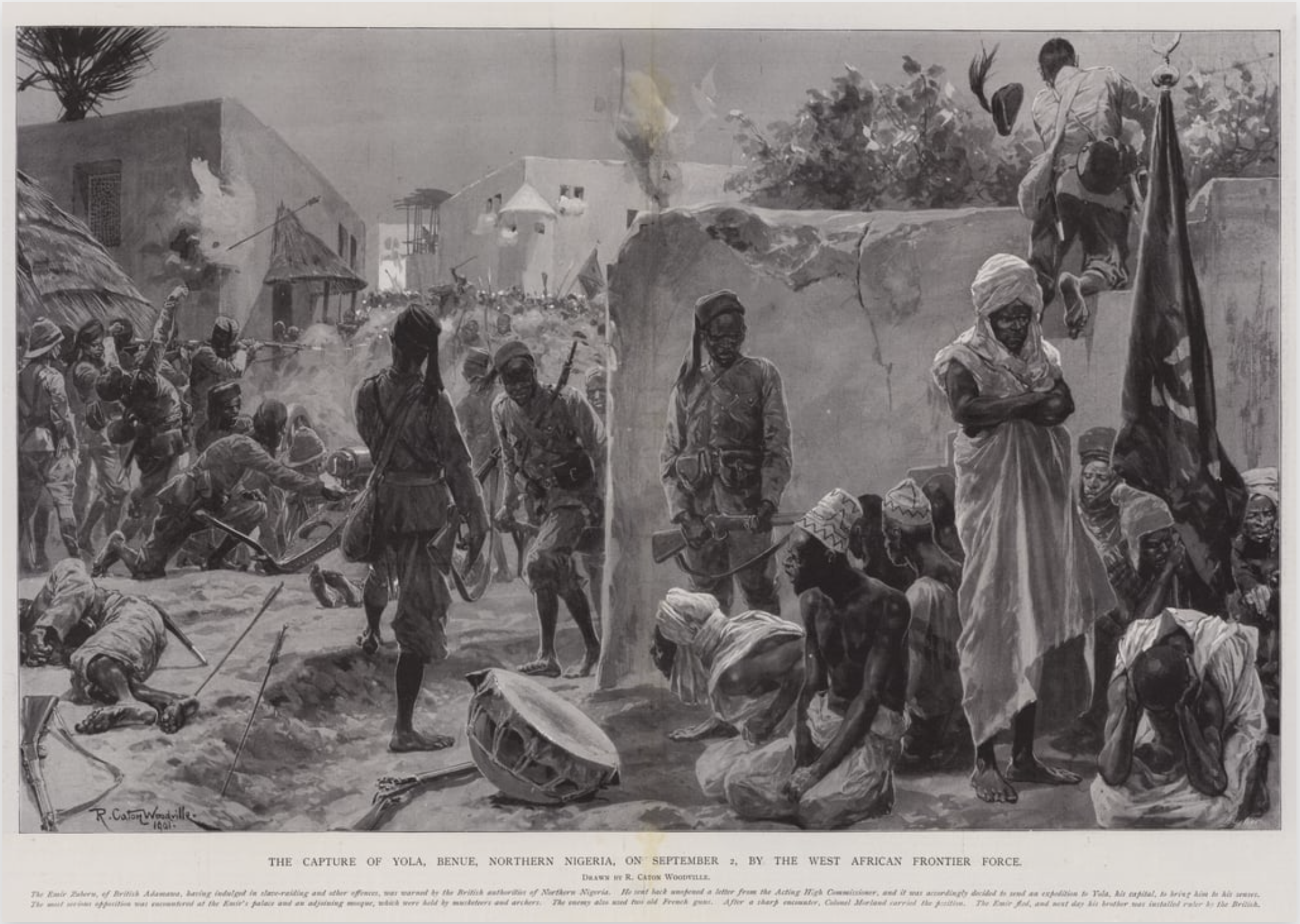
The Capture of Yola (1901)

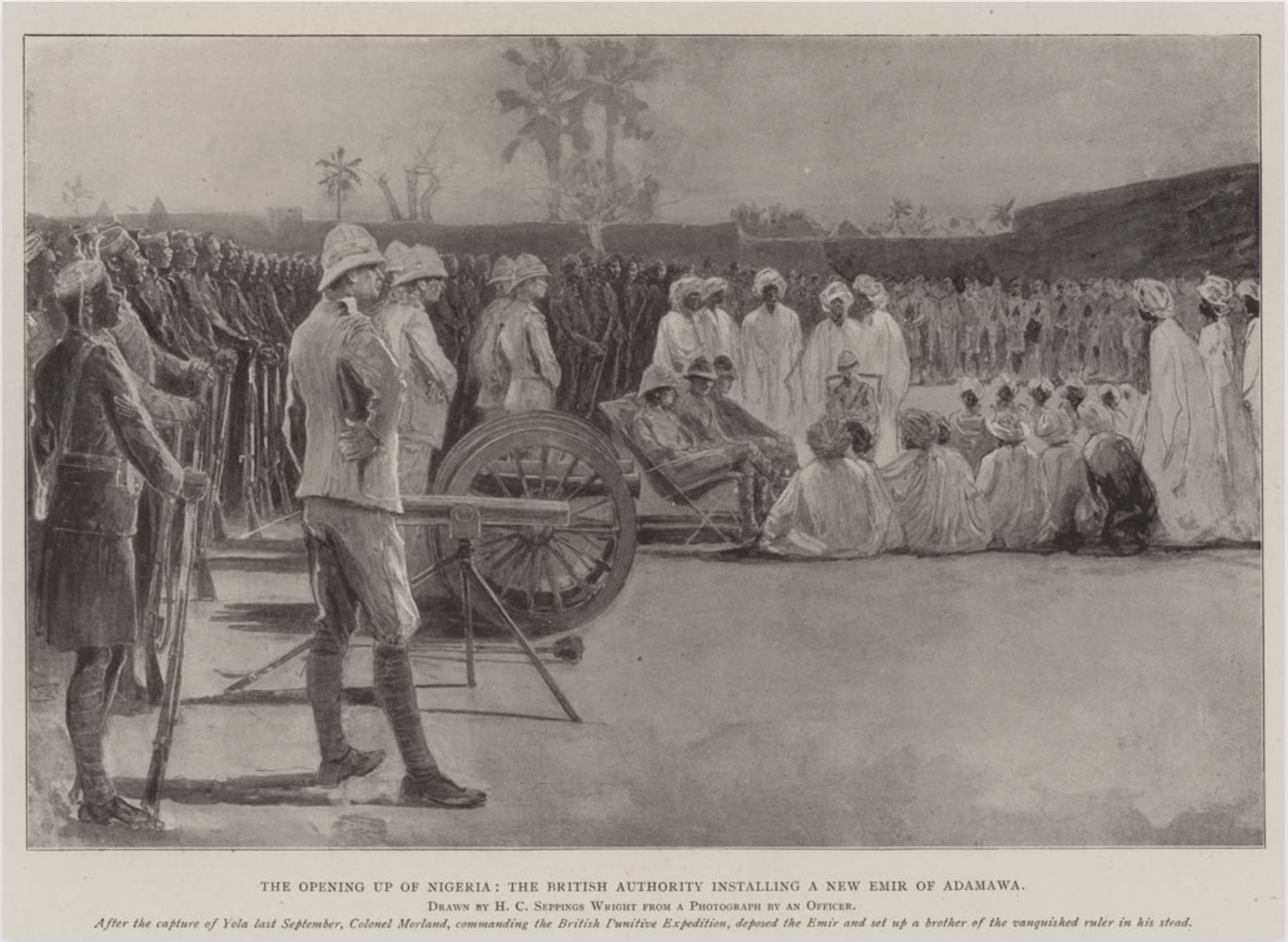
The installing of Lamido Boboa Ahmadu (1902)

==== Invasion of Yola ====
Whilst the Germans fought the Adamawa Wars against the Emirate separately, the British deployed 22 European officers and NCOs and 365 mercenaries, 275-mm guns and 4 Maxim guns, led by Colonel T.N.L. Morland for the occupation of Yola on 2 September 1901. They travelled using steamboats on the lake Njuwa and were anchored near a baobob tree locally called Bokki Hampeto. Colonel Morland sent a Shuwa Arab resident of Yola to send a letter to the Lamido containing their terms. The messenger came back three minutes later with the message that Lamido Zubayru refused to receive the letter. Upon receiving this message, Morland moved his troops closer to the town and then sent his messenger once again to the Lamido with threat that if his letter is refused again he would take steps to compel him to open it. Before the return of his messager, people riding on horses came out of the town to block the British. The messenger returned once again failing to deliver the letter to Lamido Zubairu as he was sent back and was told by the Lamido to warn Morland to retreat. More horsemen streamed out of the town to confront Morland and his forces. Morland calculated that it would be to their advantage to allow the people of Yola to attack first in the open. He felt it was much better than fighting in the narrow streets of Yola. He waited for the first attack from 10am to 1pm "after much shouting and exhorting from their mallams". Despite the battle starting, Morland ordered his men to "reserve our fire till the leaders were within 200 yards" before he have the order for the maxim guns to be fired. After this attack, Morland's forces went on the offensive. They advanced through the town till they reached the Lamido's palace and Friday mosque which were heavily defended. Morland himself was wounded by an arrow. After this battle, the casualties Morland's forces suffered were 2 men killed and 37 wounded while the Yola forces suffered 50 men killed and 150 wounded.

==== Aftermath ====
The morning after, the British forces blew up the palace's visitors chambers and other "important looking buildings" in the town of Yola. Morland also heard rumors that Lamido Zubayru, who escaped with his life, fled to Gurin, forty miles east of Yola. Acting Commissioner Wallace with Colonel Morland, by steamboat, quickly travelled to Gurin in pursuit of the Lamido. With them were 8 European officers and NCOs, 150 mercenaries and 2 maxim guns. After journeying on the river Benue, river Faro and river Heso for 26 hours, they arrived in Gurin only to be told that Emir was never there. They turned back towards Yola without any encounter. They later got information that Zubaryu was in Ribadu, fourteen miles behind them. Wallace turned back to Yola to appoint a new "Lamido" while Morland and his forces marched towards Ribadu only to find out Lamido Zubayru had also not been there. Morland spent the night in Ribadu. On the morning of 7 September, Colonel Morland shelled the town of Ribadu before returning to Yola. Boboa Ahmadu was later installed as Lamido Adamawa by the British colonial administrators.

== Chronology of Events ==
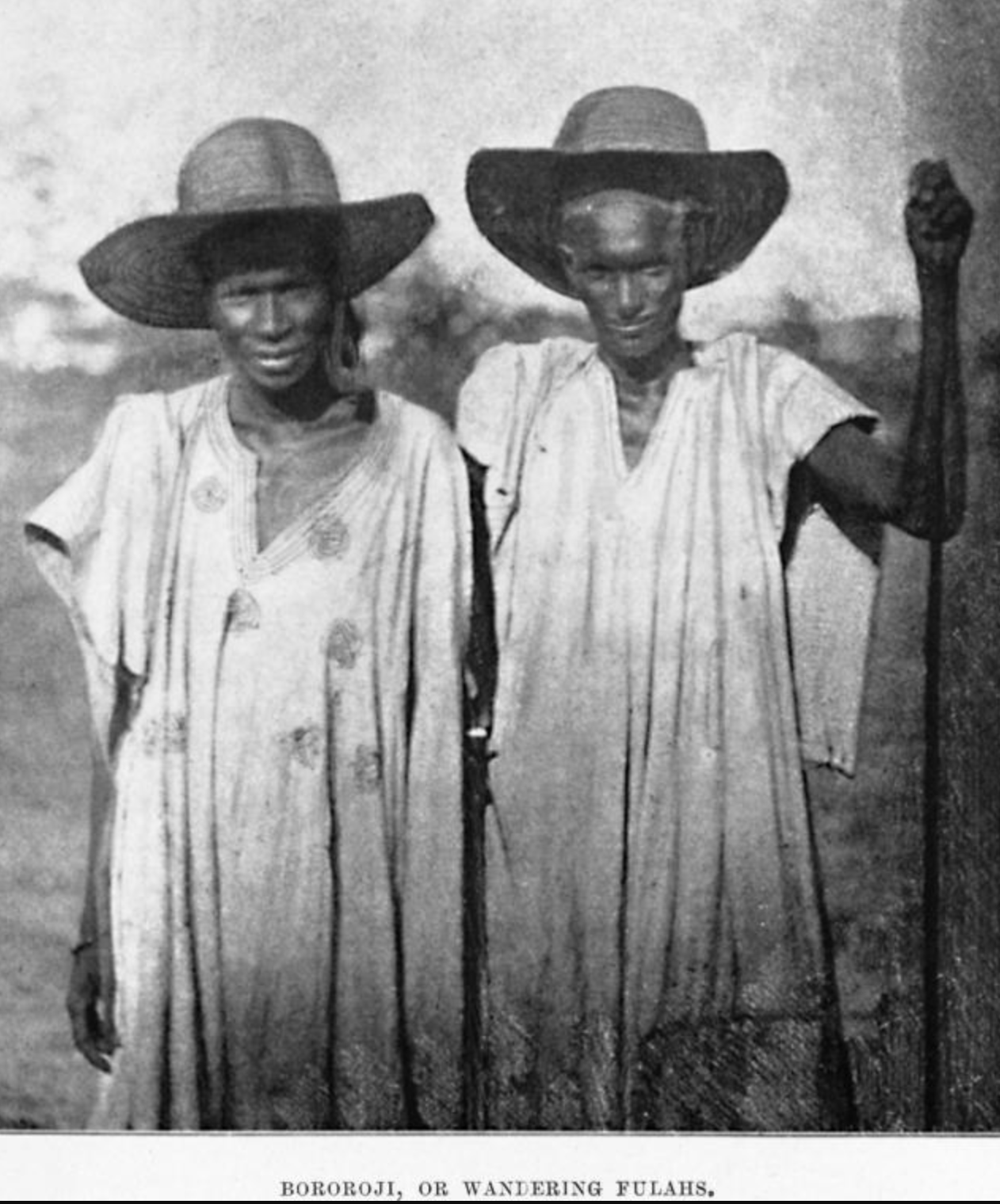
Mbororo'en in Adamawa (1900)

1300–1350: Fulani arrive in Kanem empire as envoys of Emperor of Mali

1452–1463: More Fulbe enter Hausaland and Kanem-Bornu with Islamic books.

1700s: Different Fulani groups enter Adamawa looking for pasturage for cattle

1770: Modibo Adama is born probably at Beltunde

1808: Adama sent to Uthman dan Fodio to enquire on jihad

March 1809: Uthman dan Fodio gives Adama flag and appoints him leader of the jihad in Fombina

1810–1811: Adama leads jihad in Mandara

1818: Hamman Sambo leads jihad to the South and founds Tibati

1831: Modibbo Adama moves capital to Ribadu from Gurin

1835–1837: Njobdi establishes Fulani rule in Ngaoundere

1841: Modibbo Adama moves capital to Yola

1842: Hamman Sambo receives flag from Atiku, Sultan of Sokoto, making Tibati independent of Adamawa

1842–1843: Hamman Sambo returns flag to Sultan of Sokoto and renews his loyalty to Modibbo Adama. Tibati rejoins Adamawa

February 1847: Modibbo Adama passes and Lauwal becomes Lamido of Adamawa

1872: Lamido Lauwal passes and Sanda becomes Lamido of Adamawa

1883: National African Company (later renamed Royal Niger Company) granted permission to trade and build factories in Yola by Lamido Sanda

1889: The British Commissioner, Claude MacDonald, visits Yola and Lamido Sanda refuses to see him

September 1890: Lamido Sanda passes and Zubayru becomes Lamido of Adamawa

1891: Lamido Zubayru sends spys to report on the Royal Niger Company in Nupeland

1893–1893: Lamido Zubayru war against Hayatu, great grandson of Uthman dan Fodio

7 September 1893: Lamido Zubayru summoned German, British and French representatives to resolve conflicts among them.

October 1893: Rabih az-Zubayr conquers Bornu Empire

January 1898: German invasion of Southern Adamawa

April 1901: Rabih is killed by Shehu Sanda Kura and his son, Fadl-Allah, flees to Adamawa

2 September 1901: British invasion of Yola

10 September: Bobbo Ahmadu is installed as first Lamido of Adamawa under British protectorate

== Sub-emirates of Fombina ==
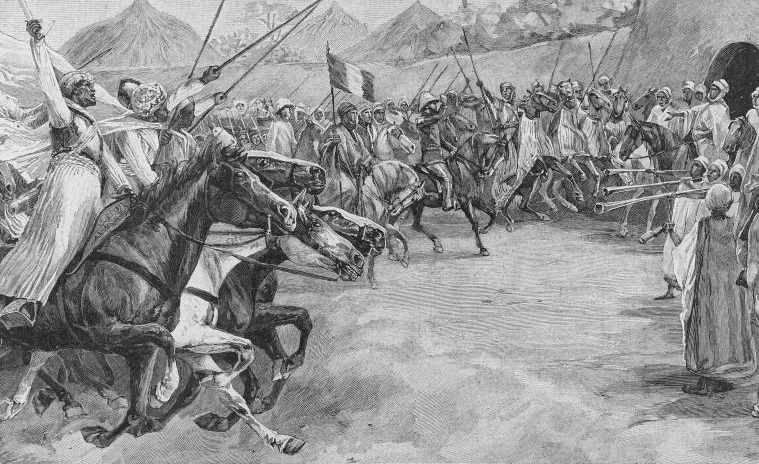
Mizon arrives in Ngaoundéré (1894)

Adamawa was a large and linguistically heterogenous emirate with over 42 sub-emirates a few of which were fairly autonomous. Some of its major sub-emirates include: Cheboa, Tibati, Ngaoundéré, Bamnyo, Malabu, Rai-Buba, Song, Zummo, Gola, Holma Pakorgel, Marwa, Bogo, Kobotshi, Laro, Belel, Daware, Mayo-Farang, Sorau, Madagali, Gider, Michika, Moda, Mubi, Uba, Mindif, Binder, Ribadu, Ribemi, Kalfu, Be, Demsa, Vokna Tola, Agorma, Pette, Wuro Mayo-Najarendi, Mbere and Balala.

Conflict between sub-emirates or lamidates (ruled by a Lamido) was frequent, and the Emir in Yola often had to mediate between them or lead military intervention when necessary. Lamidos were elected by a local council but subject to approval from Yola. The nature and strength of the bonds between Yola and the Sokoto Caliphate, and between Yola and the lamidates, could vary widely depending on the context and interests of each party but was generally loose.

== Administrative structure ==
As part of the Sokoto Caliphate, Adamawa drew heavily from Sokoto's administrative principles, particularly from the writings and teachings of the three reformist leaders, Usman, Abdullahi, and Bello. Sokoto's administrative structure was rooted in Maliki law and Qadriyya teachings.

During Adama's reign, the administrative structure in Adamawa was mostly informal. However, it was during the reign of Lauwal that significant formalization took place. Lauwal introduced various titles, such as Galadima, Waziri, Alkali, Agia, and Sarkin Yaki, which formed the Lamido's council. The chief councillor was often between the Galadima and Waziri, usually depending who was older or more experienced. Each title holder led large state departments, contributing to the governance and organization of the emirate. None of these positions were hereditary. This formalization aligned Adamawa's administrative framework more closely with the administrative thought of the Sokoto Caliphate.

=== Galadima ===
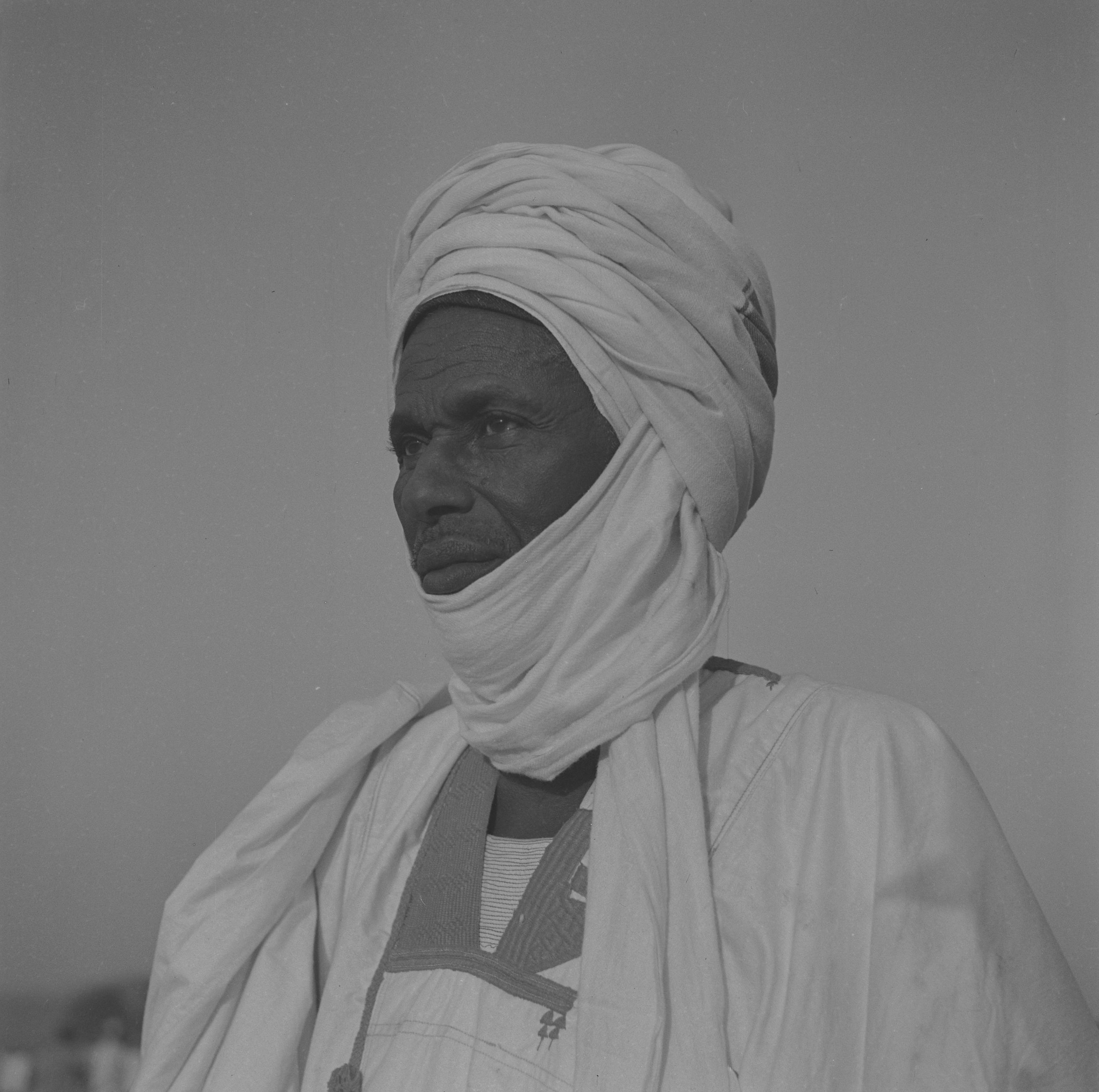
Galadima Aminu during the coronation of Lamido Yerima in 1946

The holder of this title in Adamawa held the role of overseeing the internal administration of the emirate and managing relations between Yola and its numerous districts. This title holder played a significant part in the appointment of officials to fill vacant positions. The Galadima received reports from both the Fulani and non-Fulani magaji'en (district heads) of Yola. Additionally, he was responsible for ensuring discipline and adherence to the Pulaaku code of conduct throughout the emirate's capital. Sambo Holma, a close confidant of Adama, is believed to have been the first Galadima.

1. Buba Mbamoi: soon after the office was established, Modibbo Adama appointed Mbamoi as Galadima. At the time, the post was the highest position in government.
2. Fariku (1853–1901): after the death of Mbamoi, Lamido Lawal appointed the eldest son of Modibbo Alkasum as his replacement. Alkasum was a former servant of Adama and a brother-in-law to Lawal.
3. Adamu Goni (1901–1920): Alkasum's third son was made Galadima during the reign of Muhammad Abba.
4. Dahiru b. Isa: the fourth Galadima was Dahiru, a grandson of Modibbo Raji, an influential Islamic scholar who immigrated to Adamawa from Gwandu during the reign of Lawal. He, along with his cousin Muhammadu Girei (later appointed Sardauna and District Head of Michika and Maiha) and Mallu Hamman (later appointed as Waziri), were the first from Adamawa to be Western-educated after attending Hanns Vischer's school in Kano in 1911. He was Adamawa's first Native Treasurer before his appointment as Galadima.
5. Aminu OON: Dahiru was succeeded by his cousin who doubled as the District Head of Yola.
6. Usman Muqaddas: Aminu was succeeded by his brother.
7. Bello Ahmed: Usman was succeeded by his brother.
8. Murtala Aminu OFR (1986–2011): Bello was succeeded by a son of Aminu, who was a barrister and solicitor. Prior to his appointment, he served as the Attorney-General and Commissioner for Justice for the Gongola State government from 1976 to 1979. He was a member of the five-man Legal Drafting Committee of the Constituent Assembly, contributing to the drafting of the 1979 Constitution that established the Second Republic. Additionally, he was part of the 46-member 1988 Constitutional Review Committee and later a member of the Constituent Assembly that developed the 1993 Constitution, which brought about the Third Republic. He also held positions as the chairman of Jama'atu Nasril Islam in Adamawa State and the national legal adviser of the Nigerian Supreme Council for Islamic Affairs. On 20 December 2011, he resigned as Galadima following a disagreement with Lamido Barkindo. He died in December 2020.
9. Aliyu Usman Raji (2012–2014): after the resignation Murtala, Barkindo appointed Aliyu who was a retired Grand Khadi.
10. Mustapha Aminu (2014–present): after the death of Aliyu, he was succeeded by Mustapha Aminu.

=== Waziri (Chief Vizier) ===
This position was inspired by the Vizier position of the Abbasid Caliphate. The position in Sokoto held considerable power and was second only to the Caliph. The Waziri, in Adamawa, was closely associated with the emirate's foreign affairs and its foreign visitors. Modibbo Abdullahi, a scholar from Wadai, acted as the first Waziri despite not officially assuming the title. The position was officially created by Lamido Sanda in 1873 shortly after his ascension.

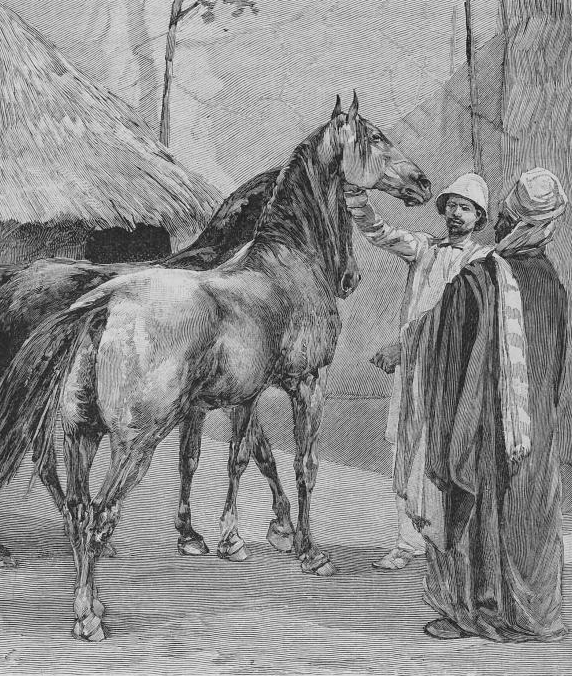
Drawing depicting Mizon's visit to Waziri Aliyu's house in 1891

There have been seven holders of this position:

1. Aliyu (1877–1891): Aliyu was the son of Modibbo Alkasum, a chief counsellor of Modibbo Adama.
2. Abdulkadir Pate (1891–1924): After the death of Aliyu during the reign of Lamido Zubeiru, his younger brother Pate assumed the position. He held this position during the first two decades of British Colonisation of the emirate and served under three Lambe.
3. Hamman (1924–1957): After the death of Pate, he was succeeded by Hamman. He was the father of Mahmud Waziri, who represented the Adamawa district of the Old Gongola State in the Senate during the Nigerian Second Republic.
4. Muhammadu Ribadu (1957–1965): Lamido Aliyu Musdafa appointed Ribadu as Waziri in 1957. Unlike his predecessors, Ribadu was a prominent politician nationwide. During his appointment, he was already a Federal Minister and vice-president of the Northern People's Congress, the dominant party in the Northern Region. Hence, Madakin Adamawa, Bello Malabu, acted in his stead.
5. Muhammad Babba Lawan (1968–2000): Ribadu died in Lagos as the Federal Minister of Defence. To replace him as Waziri, Lamido Musdafa appointed Babba Lawan, his cousin. He was maternal great-grandson of Lamido Zubairu and a paternal great-grandson of the first and second Waziri, Aliyu and Pate respectively.
6. Muhammad Abba Muhammad (2010–2017): The position of Waziri remained vacant for a decade until Lamido Muhammad Barkindo appointed Muhammad. He was a grandson of the third Galadiman Adamawa, Adamu Goni, and was married to Fadimatu Batulu, the eldest daughter of Lamido Musdafa. He served in the Emirate Council for over half a century and died at the age of 91.
7. Atiku Abubakar (2017–present): Abubakar was the former Vice-president of Nigeria (1999–2007) and Turakin Adamawa (1982–2017). He was appointed the Wazirin Adamawa by the current Lamido in 2017.

=== Alkalin Alkalai (Chief Judge) ===
The responsibility of enforcing the Sharia (Islamic law) was the task of the Alkali (from the Arabic Qadi). Aided by the muftis and modibbe (learned men) of the emirate, he took charge of the courts and is the only councillor who operated independent of the Lamido. He was, however, appointed by the Lamido.

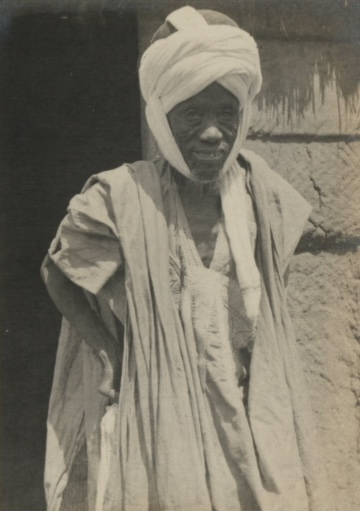
Qadi Hamman Joda in the early 20-century

Holders of this position before British Colonisation:

1. Hamman Gurin (1809–1831): Modibbo Hamman Gurin, Ardo of the Ba'en, was appointed the only Qadi of Fombina by Modibbo Adama. His appointment was the only one formally made by Adama before the capital was eventually changed from Gurin in 1831.
2. Tongude (1831–1847): After Adama moved away from Gurin, the position became vacant as Hamman remained in Gurin, now as Adama's Khalifa. He was shortly replaced by Modibbo Tongude, a migrant scholar. He held this position until his retirement after Adama's death.
3. Hassan (1847–1855): Tongude was replaced by Modibbo Hassan, a migrant scholar from Massina. Hassan followed Adama back to Fombina after one of Adama's visits to Sokoto. He was one of Adama's advisers during his reign. In this position, he was said to have been "exceptionally honest"; he was said to have tried and sentenced Lamido Lawal after a compalaint from a poor man. He held the position until his death in 1855.
4. Muhammadu 'Bilkijo' (1855–1872): Modibbo Hassan was replaced by another immigrant scholar, Muhammadu, nicknamed 'Bilkijo'. He was appointed by Lamido Lawal and held the position until Sanda's reign.
5. Abdullahi (1872–): Modibbo Abdullahi was a learned scholar, who was educated in Sokoto. During Lawal's reign, he served as the waziri. Later, as Alkalin Alkalai under Lamido Sanda, he spearheaded extensive judicial reforms in Fombina. Yola now having a lively scholastic community, there was a sufficient number of qualified modibbe to serve as Alkalai across the emirate. Fombina was divided into four zones and each were assigned a leading Yola scholar to act as an appeal judge. The sub-emirates were then assigned local Alkali'en who passed judgements that could be appealed to the higher courts, with the Yola court holding the highest authority.
6. Hamman Joda (–1908): Modibbo Hamman Joda was appointed Alkalin Alkalai during the reign of Lamido Zubeiru. He was born and raised in Chikari in the district of Rai. At the age of 17, he travelled to Ngaoundéré in search of knowledge. He later relocated to Girei to study under Modibbo Raji and eventually pursued education in Cairo, working until he could afford to study at Al-Azhar University, specializing in Law. Following his studies and pilgrimage to Mecca, he returned to Yola around 1886. Shortly after his return, he was appointed as the Alkali of Yola, and a year later, was appointed Alkalin Alkalai. He was said to have been impartial and honest. In one of his most notable cases, he sentenced a nephew of Lamido Zubeiru to death for highway robbery, a ruling which Zubeiru acceded to. On another occasion, Hamman Joda summoned Lamido Zubeiru to court in response to a complaint regarding his failure to settle debts, ultimately finding Zubeiru guilty. After the emirate fell to the British, he continued in the position until his death on 10 February 1908. He is remembered as "the most renowned Islamic judge in the history of Adamawa Emirate".

=== Ajiya (State Treasurer) ===
The collection of taxes such as zakat and jizya was the responsibility of the Agia. As the State Treasurer, he was responsible for overseeing the state's treasury and handling various sources of revenue, such as tributes, income from the Lamido's farms, and other funds. The Agia also had the authority to disburse payments on behalf of the Lamido when necessary.

=== Sarkin Yaki (Supreme Commander of the Army) ===
The holder of this title was the Supreme Commander of the Army. This individual commanded all military forces within the emirate. Additionally, the Sarkin Yaki was in charge of procuring military equipment, such as weapons and armor, for the army. Gathering intelligence on the military capabilities of both Muslim and non-Muslim groups in the region was also part of the Sarkin Yaki's responsibilities. Adamawa did not maintain a standing army. Instead, its military force was composed of volunteers. Military training was considered an integral part of general training for manhood.

== Lamibe Fombina ==
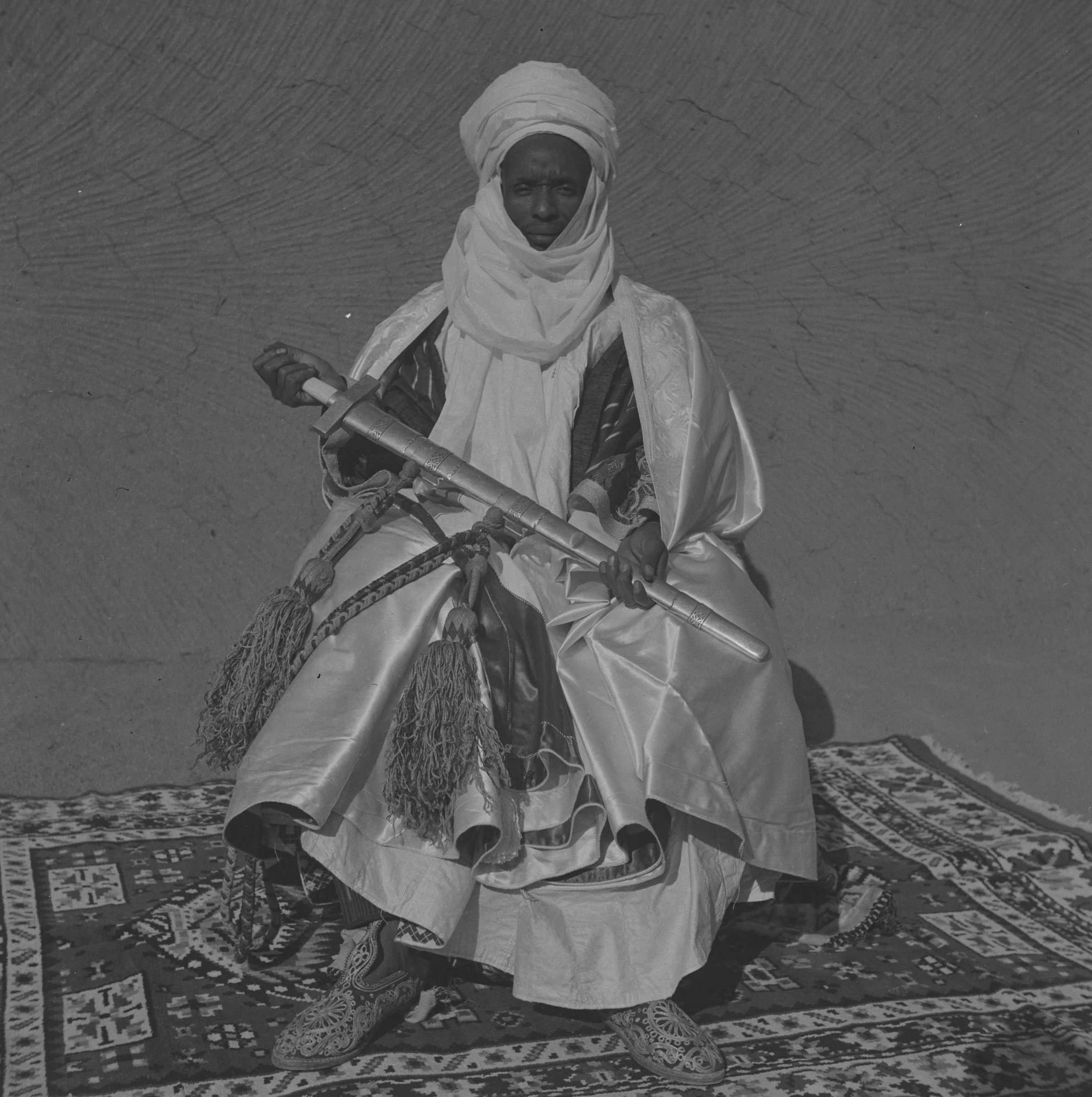
Lamido Yarima Ahmadu on his coronation day (1946)

The title Lamido Fombina or Lamido Adamawa were used for the rulers of the emirate. Lamido Fombina was the title Usman dan Fodio conferred on Modibbo Adama, the emirate's founder. The title means 'ruler of the southlands', southlands here refers to the regions south of Bornu. The word 'Lamido' means ruler in Fulfulde. It comes from the verbal root lama, meaning 'to rule', and lamu, meaning 'sovereignty'. Below is a table showing all the holders of the title till date.

Start	End	Ruler
1809	1847	Moddibo Adama bin Ardo Hasana (b. c.1771 - d. 1848)
1847	1847	Hamidu bin Adama Regent (d. c.1872)
1847	1872	Muhammadu Lawal bin Adama (b. c.1797 - d. 1872)
1872	1890	Umaru Sanda bin Adama (d. 1890)
1890	8 September 1901	Zubayru bin Adama (d. 1903)
8 September 1901	1909	Bobbo Ahmadu bin Adama (d. 1916)
1909	1910	Muhammad Yarima Iya bin Sanda
1910	23 August 1924	Muhammad Abba bin Baba Ahmadu (d. 1924)
1924	1928	Muhammad Bello "Mai Gari" bin Ahmadu "Babbawa" (d. 1928)
1928	1946	Muhammad Mustafa bin Muhammad Abba (b. 1900 - d. 1946)
1946	June 1953	Yarima Ahmadu bin Muhammad Bello
26 July 1953	13 March 2010	Aliyu Mustafa bin Muhammad Mustafa (b. 1922 - d. 2010)
18 March 2010		Muhammadu Barkindo Aliyu Musdafa (b. 1944)

=== Adamawa Royal Family ===
Family of Adamawa Emirate

Modibo Adama r. 1809–1847
Muhammadu Lawal bin Adama r. 1847–1872	Hamidu bin Adama	Umaru Sanda bin Adama r. 1872–1890	Zubayru bin Adama r. 1890–1901	Bobbo Ahmadu bin Adama r. 1901–1909
Ahmadu Yerima "Babbawa" bin Hamidu	Muhammad Yarima bin Sanda r. 1909–1910	Muhammad Abba bin Bobbo Ahmadu r. 1910–1924
Muhammad Bello bin Babbawa r. 1924– 1928	Muhammad Mustafa bin Muhammad Abba r. 1928–1946
Yarima Ahmadu bin Muhammad Bello r. 1946–1953	Aliyu Mustafa bin Muhammad Mustafa r. 1953–2010
Muhammadu Barkindo; Aliyu Musdafa r. 2010–present

== See also ==
- Sokoto Caliphate
- Kanem-Bornu empire
- Gombe emirate
- Buba Yero
- Ibrahim Njoya
