= Maigari =

- Gender: Male

Origin
- Origin: Africa
- Region of origin: Sub-Saharan Africa

Maigari is a surname or family name found in parts of Sub-Saharan Africa. It is particularly used by the Hausa people in Nigeria, Cameroon, Niger, Ghana and Libya.

== Notable people with the name ==
- Muhammad Bello Maigari, ruler of the Adamawa Emirates (1924–1928)
- Mohammed Maigari Dingyadi, Nigerian politician
- Bello Bouba Maigari, Cameroonian politician
- Aminu Maigari, Nigerian football administrator
