= Diamaré =

- Department
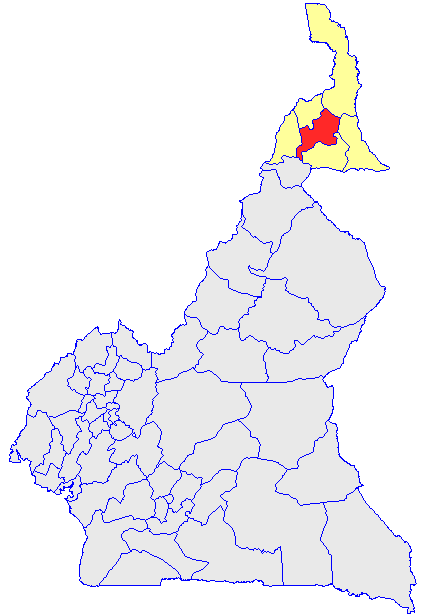
- Department location in Cameroon
- Coordinates: 10°35′37″N 14°18′52″E
- Country: Cameroon
- Province: Extreme-Nord Province
- Capital: Maroua

Area
  - Total: 1,801 sq mi (4,665 km^{2})

Population (2005)
  - Total: 642,227
- Time zone: UTC+1 (WAT)

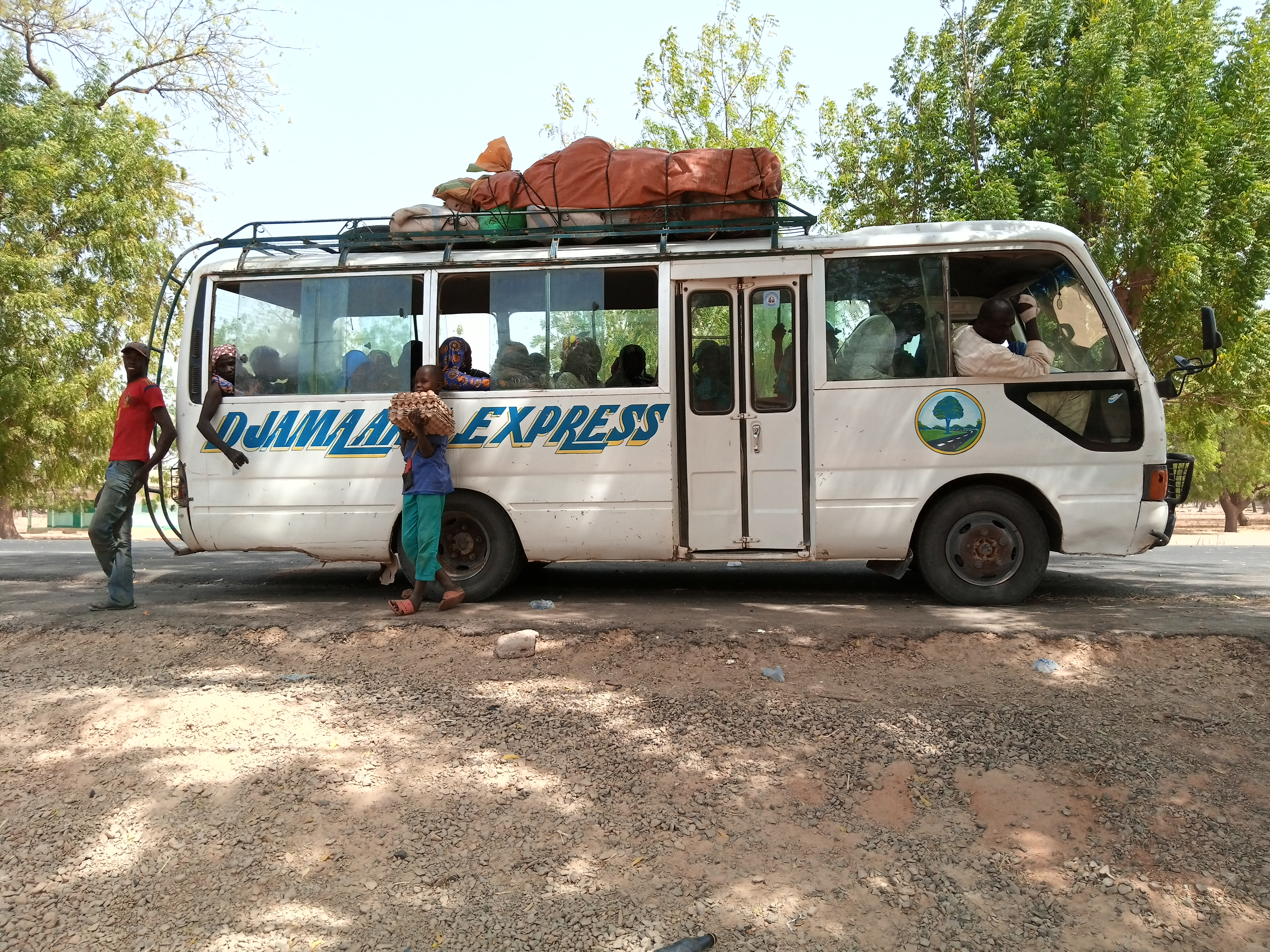
The Djamaare Express, a local bus

Diamaré is a department of Far North (Extreme-Nord) Province in Cameroon. The department covers an area of 4,665 km^{2} and at the 2005 Census had a total population of 642,227. The capital of the department is at Maroua.

== Subdivisions ==
The department is divided administratively into 9 communes and in turn into villages.

=== Communes ===
- Bogo
- Dargala
- Gawaza
- Maroua I (urban)
- Maroua II (urban)
- Maroua III (urban)
- Meri
- Ndoukoula
- Petté

== See also ==
- Communes of Cameroon
