= Muhammad Bello Maigari =

Ruler of the Adamawa Emirate 1924 to 1928

- Lamiɗo Fombina; Amir al-Yemen

Emir of Adamawa
- Reign: 23 August 1924 – 1928
- Predecessor: Muhammad Abba bin Ahmadu
- Successor: Muhammad Mustafa bin Muhammad Abba
- Born: Muhammad Bello; 1880
- Died: 1928 (aged 47–48); Yola, Adamawa Province, Colonial Nigeria
- Issue: Yerima Ahmadu
- House: House of Hamidu
- Father: Yerima Babbawa bin Hamidu

Muhammad Bello "Maigari" bin Ahmadu "Babbawa" (1880–1928) was the 8th Lamido Adamawa and was a great-grandson of Modibbo Adama. Prior to his ascension to the throne of Adamawa, he was the founder and Lamido of Nassarawo in modern-day Jada.

== Life ==
=== Maigari's father and grandfather ===
Maigari was born in 1880 during the reign of Lamido Umaru Sanda. His father, Yerima Babbawa, was the grandson of Modibbo Adama and the Lamdo of Nyibango. Yerima's father, Hamidu bin Modibbo Adama, administered a significant swath of land primarily inhabited by Chamba and Verre peoples, establishing Nyibango (also known as Hibango), about 30 miles south west of Yola, as its administrative center.

After Lamido Lawal's death in 1872, the primary contenders to succeed him were Hamidu and Sanda, both sons of Modibbo Adama, the emirate's founder. Hamidu emerged as the leading candidate, being the eldest surviving son of Adama and the most learned. However, the Yola Saraki'en (aristocracy) chose to endorse the younger Umaru Sanda for succession, presenting him to Sultan Abubakar-na-Rabah of Sokoto. Upon reviewing both sides, the Sultan sided with Hamidu and called for his appointment as Lamido. The Yola Saraki'en sent a letter to the Sultan appealing his decision, but Hamidu died before a reply could be given. Consequently, Umaru Sanda was appointed as Lamido.

Lamido Sanda subsequently appointed Yerima Babbawa, who was 14 years old at the time, as the new Lamdo Nyibango. However, Sanda later reconsidered this decision and attempted to remove him but Yerima swore to defend Nyibango till death, prompting Sanda to back down.

When Germany and Britain colonised the region in the early 20th-century, only a small portion of Yerima's domain, including Nyibango, fell under British control, while the rest came under German rule in Kamerun. Yerima, deeming himself too old to serve under European colonial rule, retired to his hometown of Nyibango.

=== Founding of Nassarawo and conflict with the British ===
After the British colonial forces captured Yola in 1901, Maigari fled the city along with Lamido Zubeiru. Their small group traversed various villages, eluding European forces in the emirate and never staying in one place for two consecutive nights. The Germans, led by Hans Dominik, eventually caught up with Lamido Zubeiru in Marwa, leading to a battle. Using machine guns, Dominik's army killed four hundred and twenty-four Sikirris ('those vowed to die') of Lamdo Ahmadu of Marua. Despite the onslaught, Zubeiru and his party managed to escape, finding sanctuary in the Mandara hills. While passing through Bazza (now part of modern-day Michika), the group was robbed. A Kanuri man named Bukar came to their aid, providing Maigari with a spear for defense. Two decades later, when Maigari became Lamido, he reciprocated this act of kindness. After nearly two years of fleeing, Zubeiru was killed in a village called Go, by some Lala men believing him to be a slave raider.

Upon returning to Nyibango and seeing what remained of his father's territory, Maigari left for the 'German' side and was recognised as the ruler by the local population. A large following, consisting of Fulani, Chamba, and Verre peoples, joined him in crossing over. He immediately founded the town of Nassarawo and entered into negotiations with the German colonial officers. He sent presents of cattle, guinea corn, and horses to the German Resident at Garoua, which later secured him their recognition. This move alienated Maigari from the British, who accused him of "coercing Fulanis and pagans under him to cross the border against their will" and of slave raiding and stealing. G. N. Barclay, the British Resident at Yola, issued an arrest warrant for Maigari and dispatched mounted troops to find and abduct him. The troops succeeded in catching him near the border but he managed to escape and return to German territory. Consequently, on 20 February 1909, Barclay met with Kurt Strümpell, the German Resident at Garoua, to urge him to 'curb' Maigari. Strümpell agreed to this, but the Germans were "either unwilling or unable to curb him effectively." The British later appointed one Hammawa b. Iyabano b. Hamidu, a nephew of Yerima, as the ruler of the 'British' portion of the territory, with headquarters at Nyibango. This appointment led into a "pathethic family feud" which led to "a lot of bloodshed and bitterness" and lasted up until the First World War with which it merged.

=== Maigari under the British ===
During the Kamerun campaign of the First World War, Maigari initially supported the Germans. However, as he sensed the British forces were likely to win and take control of his territory, his loyalty began to waver. The Germans noticed this shift and arrested him. They planned to transfer him to Kontcha under the escort of nine soldiers. However, during the night, Maigari killed four soldiers and escaped with their heads to Yola where he presented them to the Resident, who initially placed him under house arrest but later restored him to his fief in Nassarawo.

Maigari was now under British colonial rule but largely enjoyed autonomous freedom. He grew more powerful than he ever was by increasing his territory. He regularly refused orders from Yola which frustrated the colonial administrators but they respected his competence describing him as "the most important and far the ablest of the District Heads". The colonial Officer who translated one of his letters to the Governor "admired his strong personality and administrative capabilities" and suggested he could be appointed Lamido Adamawa. He, however, was greatly feared among the Chamba and other non-Fulani groups of the area. He led or ordered raids on villages that led to destruction of farmlands and left many people dead.

During the First World War, Babbawa moved to Nassarawo to stay with his son and live out the rest of his life. The constant raids sent by the British from Yola when Maigari was still with the Germans, however, led Babbawa to move to Mapeo, 15 miles from Nassarawo. Babbawa was killed in Mapeo not long after. Maigari wrote to the regional Governor:

My father died fighting like an old lion among a pack of wild dogs; they brought his Fez, his Gown and his Praying beads to (Lamido) Abba in Yola. Am I to swear loyalty and obedience to this Abba? Am I to suffer his taunts and insults? Am I the son of my murdered father? Were there no Europeans in this area, the Lamido of Yola would not attempt to interfere with me or compel my allegiance, but he would live in constant dread of my coming to exact vengeance for my father's murder and install myself as the acceptable Lamido of Yola. For well he knows how many of the Yola Sarakuna would join me as I approach that town.

He appealed to the British not to put him under the sphere of Yola or he would renounce his title and leave for Mecca with his family. Six years later in 1924, while Lamido Abba was dying of prostate cancer, Maigari deployed troops to surround Yola. The British did not interfere as they viewed Maigari as a favourable candidate for Lamido and as an ally who will protect British interests. After the passing of Abba, Maigari, and his troops, advanced towards the royal palace. He arrived just as the kingmakers were about to choose the new Lamido Adamawa. The kingmakers chose him as the 8th Lamido of Adamawa. He was the first Lamido of Adamawa from the royal House of Hamidu, the only royal House to not produce a Lamido prior to Maigari. Lamido Maigari died after a protracted illness.

After Maigari was made Lamido Adamawa, the position of District Head of Nassarawo was passed to his cousin Chiroma as none of his sons were of age. He was later dismissed and Dan Buram, a "bagman" who was a follower of Chiroma, was chosen to replace him. Later, Hamman Tukur was transferred to be the District Head of Nassarawo and also the Wakilin Chamba of the Chiefdoms comprising Gurum, Yebbi, Tolla and Sugu districts.
