= Muhammadu Barkindo Aliyu Musdafa =

Lamido of Adamawa

Muhammadu Barkindo
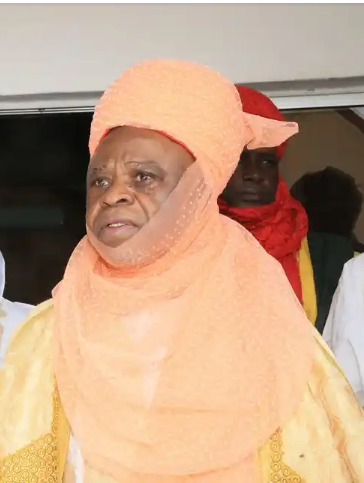
- Muhammadu Barkindo, c.2010–2022

Lamido of Adamawa
- Reign: 13 March 2010 – present
- Predecessor: Aliyu Musdafa
- Born: 13 February 1944 (age 82); Gembu (Mambila Plateau), Adamawa, Nigeria
- Father: Aliyu Musdafa
- Occupation: politician, businessman
- Education: Barewa College; Ahmadu Bello University; North London Polytechnic; St Clements University

Muhammadu Barkindo Aliyu Mustapha (born 13 February 1944) was turbaned on 18 March 2010 as the traditional ruler, title Lamido of Adamawa in Adamawa State, Nigeria. The ceremony followed by the approval of the state governor Murtala Nyako.

== Early career ==
Barkindo was born in Yola in February 1944, eldest son of the Lamido Aliyu Musdafa. He attended Barewa College, Zaria and then Ahmadu Bello University, Zaria where he obtained a Diploma in Law in 1969. Later he attended North London Polytechnic (1973–1975) and St Clements University in the Turks and Caicos Islands (2000–2002). He worked with the Nigeria Customs Service, Nigerian Port Authority and the National Freight Company. Joining the Gongola State civil service, he became a Commissioner for Works and later a Commissioner for Animal Health. Barkindo was a director of the National Engineering and Technical Company (1991–1993), chairman of Stirling Civil Engineering Nigeria Limited (1991–2003) and chairman of the Federal Radio Corporation of Nigeria (2003–2005).

== Adamawa Emirate ==
In April 2009 the Adamawa Emirate which was founded in 1809 by the scholar and spiritual leader, Modibbo Adama celebrated its bicentennial celebration. Barkindo was deputy chairman of the organizing committee. Barkindo's father Aliyu Musdafa died on 13 March 2010 at the age of 88 after reigning for 57 years. His funeral was attended by 20 state governors and other dignitaries. Aliyu Musdafa had groomed Barkindo for the succession, appointing him Chiroma Adamawa in 1980, and placing him in the emirate council in 1987. Barkindo's appointment five days after his father's death as the 12th Lamido of Adamawa was recommended by the emirate's kingmakers after considering six candidates, two from each of the three ruling houses of the emirate, Yelwa, Sanda and Toungo. All eleven kingmakers cast their votes in favor of Lamido.

In May 2010 Barkindo said traditional titles were not for sale and would be given only to worthy candidates based on recommendations of the emirate's king makers. In June 2010 he warned of the effects of climate change, advising farmers to plant hardy crops and saying the Adamawa emirate would support policies to improve agricultural productivity. In September 2010, as Chairman of the Adamawa State Council of Chiefs and Emirs, Barkindo called on Muslims to ensure that they marked the Eid ul-Fitr celebration at the end of Ramadan on the same day throughout the state.
