= Zubeiru bi Adama =

4th Lamido of Adamawa from 1890 to 1901

Zubairu bin Adama

Lamido of Adamawa
- Reign: 1890 – 1 September 1901
- Predecessor: Umaru Sanda bin Adama
- Successor: Bobbo Ahmadu
- Born: 1836
- Died: 1903 (aged 66–67); Gudu
- Father: Modibbo Adama

Zubeiru bin Adama (Arabic: زبير بن أداما, romanized: Zubayr bin ʾĀdamā; 1836 – 1903) was the fourth Lamido of Adamawa, ruling from 1890 until he was forced into exile by British colonial forces in 1901. The Adamawa Emirate, founded by his father, Modibo Adama, was under threat from the Germans, French, and British by the time of his accession. He was best remembered for his 'hopeless, though spirited, rearguard action' against European encroachment on the emirate.

== Early life ==
Zubeiru was born in 1836 to Modibbo Adama, the founder of the Adamawa Emirate, and Yara, a Marghi woman. Yara is sometimes identified as a concubine, but according to historian Martin Njeuma, this is false as Adama did not keep concubines.

== Reign ==
=== Accession ===
Before his death, Umaru Sanda, the Lamido of Adamawa and a half-brother to Zubeiru, devised a plan with his councillors to have his favorite son, Iya, succeed him as Lamido. The plan involved having Sanda buried in his personal residence, which would then be inherited by Iya. This would allow Iya to use the occasion to garner the support of the people of Yola, as, according to Adamawa customs, a new Lamido is chosen on the burial day of the previous one. However, after Sanda's death in 1890, another of Adama's sons, Aliyu, who was aware of Sanda's scheme, persuaded the palace slaves to bury the body next to Adama at Zubeiru's house, which Zubeiru had inherited from his father. As a result, Zubeiru hosted the people of Yola who came to mourn the Lamido, and he was automatically selected as the new Lamido.

=== Relationship with his councillors ===
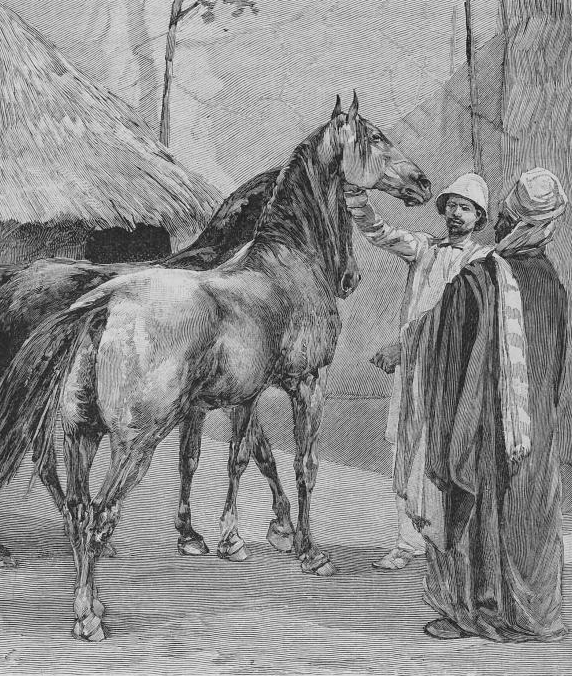
Waziri Abdulkadir Pate with Antoine Mizon in 1894

The manner in which Zubeiru was appointed angered his councillors, who were hesitant to approve the appointment. Sensing this, Zubeiru immediately summoned them and assured them that they would all retain their positions on his council as an act of reconciliation. Zubeiru's accession also displeased the Caliph of Sokoto, Umaru bin Ali, who had been involved in Sanda's plan to appoint Iya as Lamido. It was said that the Caliph sent Zubeiru a black turban instead of the customary white turban given to the Lamidos of Adamawa upon their accession, which angered Zubeiru, further damaging the relationship between Sokoto and Adamawa. Zubeiru came to blame Sokoto for much of the instability in his domain and avoided traveling to Sokoto, as was customary, for fear of being arrested and detained.

Zubeiru's councillors sent a letter to Sokoto informing the Caliph of their approval of his appointment and assured him they would ensure Zubeiru's loyalty to Sokoto. Zubeiru resented having to seek the approval of his councillors in decision-making, as had been the case under Sanda. Influential figures like Galadima Fariku and Waziri Aliyu commanded great respect, making it difficult for Zubeiru to dismiss them without provocation. As a result, Zubeiru formed an informal 'inner cabinet' consisting of councillors he trusted most. These included 'the king of Arabs', Bobbo Ahmadu, his full brother who often acted as his deputy, and Ahmad Joda, the Chief Alkali and his personal teacher.

Unlike Sanda, Zubeiru was known for his strictness. Upon taking office, he immediately implemented reforms, including severe punishments for corruption among state officers. His strict laws were enforced by Alkali Ahmed Joda, an Al-Azhar educated jurist known for his impartiality in applying the law and who was the most influential member of Zubeiru's inner council. Under Alkali Joda, the law was applied equally to everyone, including the Lamido and his family. When one of Zubeiru's nephews was brought before him for highway robbery, the Alkali found him guilty and recommended the death penalty. Zubeiru agreed and ordered his nephew to be hanged.

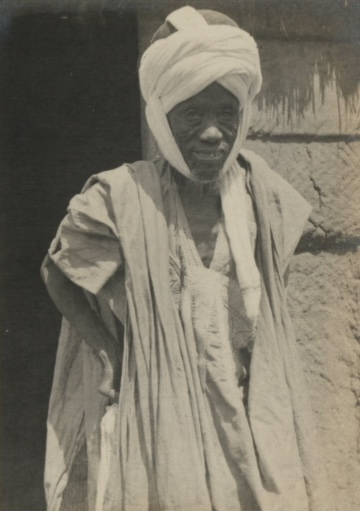
Alkali Ahmed Joda during the reign of Bobbo Ahmadu (1901–1909)

Around 1895-96, someone lodged a complaint that several of his slaves had absconded to the rumde (slave-farming village) of Galadima Fariku, with the Galadima's knowledge. Alkali Joda summoned Galadima Fariku to court to answer the charges, but this order was ignored. As the most senior member of the council and having served for over forty years, Fariku was a powerful figure. He had also supported Sanda's plot to appoint Iya as Lamido and distrusted Zubeiru, suspecting that the Lamido and Alkali Joda had conspired to discredit him publicly. Alkali Joda reported the matter to Zubeiru, who later made a public statement in the mosque, declaring that anyone who refused to heed an Alkali's summons was an unbeliever. Despite this, Galadima Fariku refused to make any move, leading Zubeiru to order a raid on his rumde. The slaves were recovered and returned to the plaintiff.

Galadima Fariku did not respond publicly but instead set his supporters to work on seeking revenge against Zubeiru through the courts. They discovered that during one of Zubeiru's campaigns, he had run out of supplies and borrowed cows to feed his army, which had not been repaid. The owner was encouraged to lodge a formal complaint with Alkali Joda. The Alkali summoned Lamido Zubeiru to court. When Zubeiru appeared at a full hearing, Alkali Joda removed his turban and gown, which were traditionally given to all of the Lamido's officials upon appointment. This public gesture indicated that the Alkali was trying Zubeiru according to God's laws, not as the Lamido. At the end of the case, Zubeiru was found guilty and ordered to repay the debt. It is said that Zubeiru was so impressed with Alkali Joda's impartiality that he walked up to him afterward and, raising his hand, said 'gorko' three times, meaning he had proven himself a hero.

This strict enforcement of the law imposed a certain discipline in Yola, causing many to fear and despise Zubeiru. It was said that he escaped several attempts by his subordinates to poison him.

=== Relationship with sub-emirates ===
Under Sanda, Yola avoided the use of military force and primarily focused on extensive administrative and judicial reforms. Although these reforms were relatively successful, Yola's weakness encouraged rebellions and internal conflicts throughout the emirate, weakening its authority over the sub-emirates.

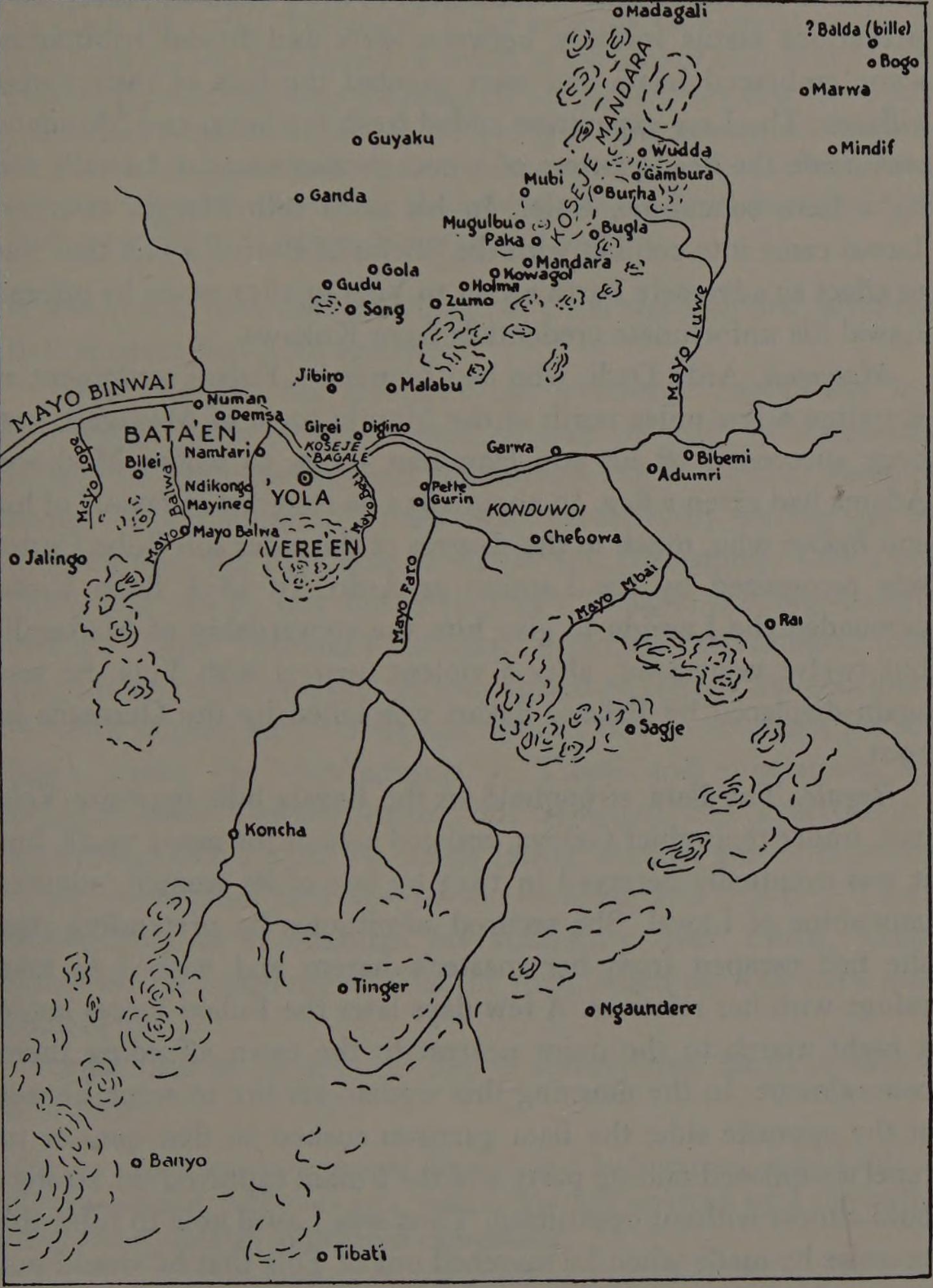
Map of the Adamawa Emirate in the 19th-century

Upon his accession, Zubeiru began a series of wars and, according to Adamawa tradition, never spent a full month in Yola. Throughout his reign, Zubeiru was determined to preserve the territorial unity and integrity of his emirate. He began with the sub-emirate of Bibemi, which had acted independently under Sanda. Although Bibemi was besieged, the siege was lifted after Mansur, the Lamdo (chief), agreed to restore normal relations with Yola. This marked the beginning of Zubeiru's policy of sending punitive expeditions against sub-emirates that failed to pledge allegiance, whose Lambe (plural of Lamdo) failed to visit Yola regularly, or who neglected to send the annual tribute. As a result, the sub-emirates that had rebelled against Sanda began fulfilling their obligations to Yola.

Because open rebellion brought severe consequences, some Lambe found other ways to undermine Zubeiru's authority. The most common method was desertion during military campaigns. During the Pugo war in 1891, Ardo Adamu of Be and Lamdo Njobdi of Gider deserted the battlefield, leading to the defeat and rout of Zubeiru's army. During the fighting, his eldest son, Sadu, was captured and tortured to death by the Pugo people. As punishment, Zubeiru issued a warning to Lamdo Njobdi and deposed Ardo Adamu.

Although Zubeiru had some success in asserting his authority over his subordinates, his failure to subdue the large non-Fulbe groups in Adamawa signaled that Yola was no longer the military power it had been during the reigns of Modibbo Adama and his immediate successor, Lawal. His unpopularity in Yola, including among military leaders, further weakened his military position.

Succession disputes were a common issue in the emirate, particularly in the wealthy sub-emirates of Banyo and Rai-Buba. It was the Lamido's responsibility to settle these disputes, though it was often difficult for him to intervene without being officially called upon. During Zubeiru's reign, Rai-Buba experienced its third and most violent dynastic conflict, which resulted in the killing of Lamdo Buba Jurum by his own sons. Zubeiru refused to intervene in the conflict, instead cursing the brothers for murdering their father.

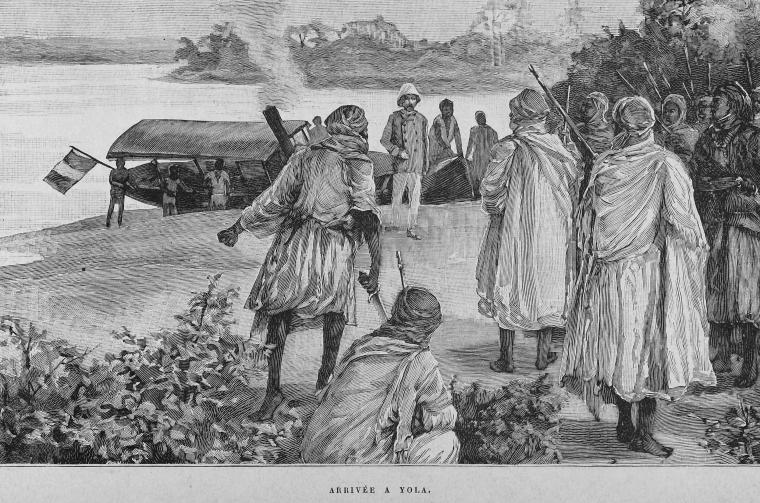
Arrival of Antoine Mizon in 1894

=== Exile ===
His rule was weakened by war against Hayatu ibn Sa'id and then attempts to resist the Royal Niger Company and British administration under Frederick Lugard. In 1901 he was forced to flee Yola and become an exiled renegade.

In his letter to Sultan Abdur Rahman Atiku, announcing his own ouster from Yola by the British, he pledged

I will not be two faced, on your side and on the side of the Christians too. My allegiance is to you, to God and the Prophet, and after you to the Imam Mahdi. There is no surrender to the unbeliever even after the fall of the strongholds.

Zubairu kept his pledge, he continued resistance against both the British and the Germans till he was killed around Gudu, allegedly by "pagans", who mistook his identity, eighteen months after he was forced out of his capital.

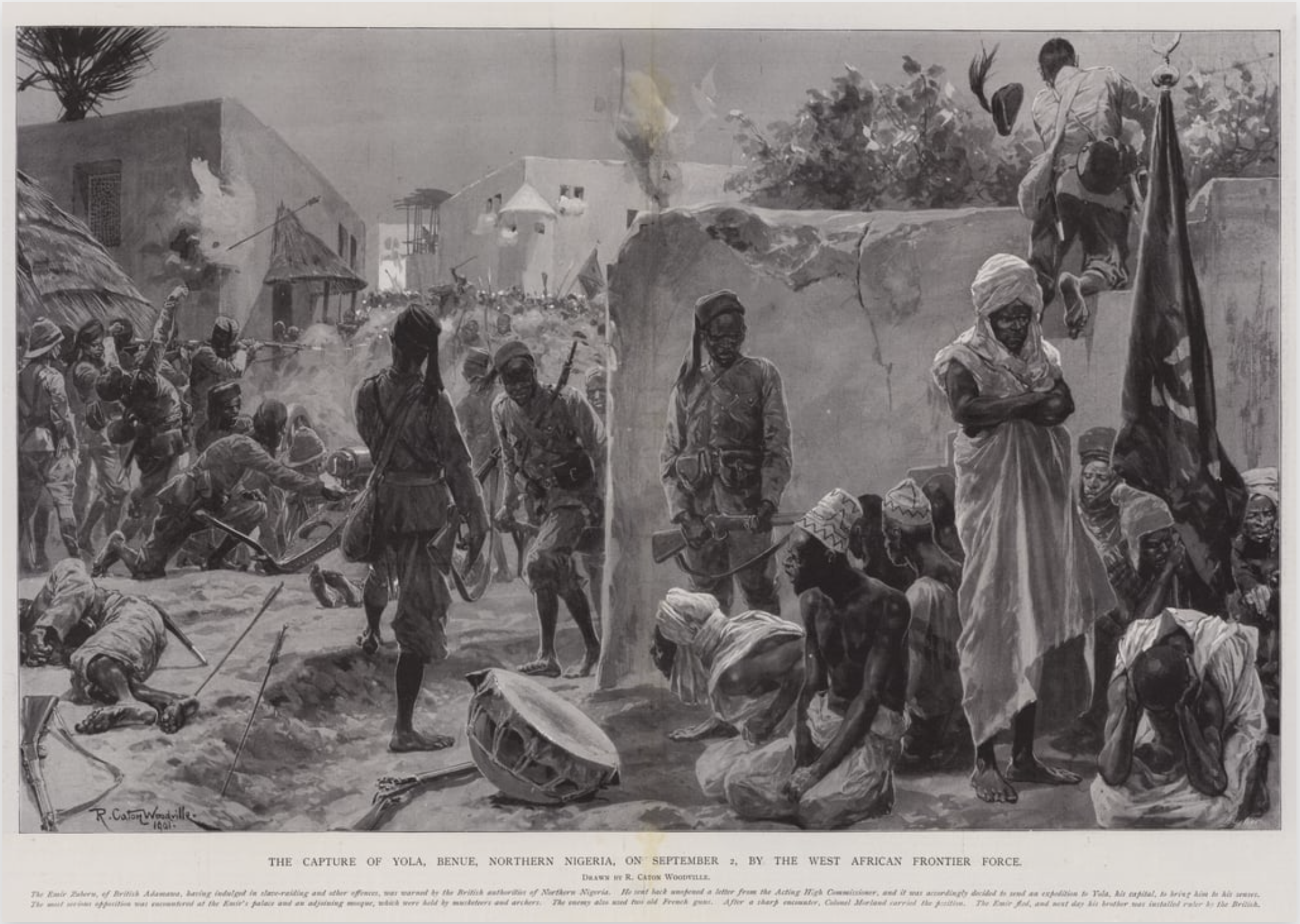
The Capture of Yola (1901) by Richard Caton Woodville Jr.

== Death ==
While in German Adamawa after he was driven out of Yola, Lamido Zubairu fought the Germans in a number of places. Garwa was one of those places. After hiding for six months among the people of Adumri, he attacked a German garrison there with the help of the local population. He also fought them at Marwa with the help of the local population massively helping Zubairu and suffering very heavy casualties. Lamido Zubairu and the chief of Marwa, Lamido Ahmadu, moved to Madagali. The Germans caught up to him and engaged in battle. After his defeat, he went back to British Adamawa in October 1902. He took refuge at Gudu, a non-Fulbe town north of Song. While he was there, he was distributing propaganda leaflets "doing as much as he could to stir up the Fulani to rise up". He remained there for over five months before the British zeroed in on him. The British burnt down the town of Gudu but he managed to escape with his life. He was later killed by the Lala at Go, the latter not knowing his identity.
