= Stade Municipal de Guider =

Multi-use stadium in Guider, Cameroon

- Interactive map of Stade Municipal de Guider
- Full name: Stade Municipal de Guider
- Location: Guider, Cameroon
- Capacity: 2,000

Tenant
- Espérance Guider

Stade Municipal de Guider is a multi-use stadium in Guider, Cameroon. It is currently used mostly for football matches. It serves as a home ground of Espérance FC. The stadium holds 2,000 people.
