= Meri, Cameroon =

Commune of Cameroon

Coordinates: 10°46′N 14°07′E

Meri is a commune in Diamaré Department, Cameroon. In 2005, the population was recorded at 86834.

== See also ==
- Communes of Cameroon
