= Espérance Guider =

Cameroonian football club

Espérance
- Full name: Espérance FC
- Ground: Stade Municipal de Guider; Guider, Cameroon
- Capacity: 2,000
- League: MTN Elite Two
- 2007–08: 14, Relegated
Home colours

Espérance FC is a Cameroonian football club based in Guider. They are a member of the Cameroonian Football Federation. Their home stadium is Stade Municipal de Guider.

== Stadium ==
The club uses Stade Municipal de Guider, a multi-use stadium in Guider, Cameroon, as its home ground. The stadium holds 2,000 people.
