= Dargala =

Coordinates: 10.6316°N 14.6588°E

- Commune and town
- Interactive map of Dargala
- Country: Cameroon
- Time zone: UTC+1 (WAT)

Dargala is a town and commune in Cameroon.

== See also ==
- Communes of Cameroon
