= Gawaza =

Coordinates: 10.5308°N 14.1404°E

- Commune and town
- Interactive map of Gawaza
- Country: Cameroon
- Time zone: UTC+1 (WAT)

Gawaza is a town and commune in Cameroon.

== See also ==
- Communes of Cameroon
