= Bogo, Cameroon =

Commune of Cameroon

Coordinates: 10.734°N 14.608°E

Bogo is a commune in Diamaré Department, Cameroon. In 2005, the population was recorded at 21,046.

== See also ==
- Communes of Cameroon
