= Colonial history of Northern Nigeria =

The Colonial history of Northern Nigeria extends from the British pacification campaigns to the independence of Northern Nigeria in 1953.

Initially, the British involvement in Northern Nigeria was predominantly trade-related and revolved around the expansion of the Royal Niger Company. The Royal Niger Company's interior territories spread north from where the Niger River and Benue River joined, at Mount Patti, Lokoja. The company did not represent a direct threat to much of the Sokoto Caliphate or the numerous states of Northern Nigeria. This changed when Frederick Lugard and Taubman Goldie laid down an ambitious plan to pacify the Nigerian interior and unite it with the rest of the British Empire.

== Protectorate ==
Frederick Lugard proclaimed the protectorate of Northern Nigeria at Ida in Kogi on January 1, 1897. The basis of the colony was the 1885 Treaty of Berlin, which broadly granted Northern Nigeria to Britain on the basis of their protectorates in Southern Nigeria. Hostilities with the powerful Sokoto Caliphate soon followed. The Emirates of Kabba, Kotogora and Illorin were the first to be conquered by the British. In February 1903, the great fort of Kano, site of the Kano Emirate, was captured, followed by Sokoto and much of the rest of its caliphate shortly after. On March 13, 1903, the Grand Shura of the Sokoto Caliphate conceded to Lugard's demands.

Lugard became governor; with limited resources, he administered the region with the consent of local rulers. He governed through a policy of indirect rule, which he developed into a sophisticated political theory. Lugard left the protectorate after some years, serving in Hong Kong, but eventually returned to work in Nigeria, where he decided on the merger of the Northern Nigeria Protectorate with Southern Nigeria in 1914. Agitation for independence from the radically different Southern Protectorate, however, led to a formidable split during the 1940s. The Richards constitution, adopted in 1945, gave overwhelming autonomy to the North. This autonomy eventually included the legislative arenas of foreign relations and customs policy.

== Independence ==
Northern Nigeria was granted independence on March 15, 1953, with Sir Ahmadu Bello as its first Premier. The Northern Peoples Congress under Sir Ahmadu Bello dominated Parliament, while the Northern Elements Progressive Union became the main opposition party.
