= Modzogo =

Coordinates: 10.9660°N 13.9068°E

- Commune and town
- Interactive map of Modzogo
- Country: Cameroon
- Time zone: UTC+1 (WAT)

Modzogo is a town and commune in Cameroon.

== See also ==
- Communes of Cameroon
