= Petté =

Coordinates: 10°58′N 14°30′E

- Commune and town
- Interactive map of Petté
- Country: Cameroon
- Time zone: UTC+1 (WAT)

Petté is a town and commune in Cameroon.

== See also ==
- Communes of Cameroon
