= Guider =

- Location in Cameroon
- Coordinates: 9°56′3″N 13°56′55″E
- Country: Cameroon
- Province: North Province
- Division: Mayo-Louti
- Elevation: 337 m (1,106 ft)

Population (2023)
  - Total: 400,000

Guider (sometimes spelled Guidder) is a city situated in Cameroon's North Province, close to the border with Chad. It has a population of 400,000. Guider is the departmental capital of the Mayo-Louti.

== Sports ==
The city is home to Espérance FC, that competes in the Cameroon Premiere Division. Stade Municipal de Guider is a multi-use stadium in the city, serving as home ground of the club.
