= Lamido =

Honorific title meaning "great leader" or "great king"

Lamido (Adlam: 𞤂𞤢𞤥𞤭𞤣𞤮, pl. lamibe 𞤂𞤢𞤥𞤭𞤦𞤫 or lamidos) is the Anglicisation of a term from the Fula language or Fulfulde, used to refer to a ruler. In the language it is properly laamiiɗo (𞤂𞤢𞥄𞤥𞤭𞥅𞤯𞤮, pl. laamiiɓe 𞤂𞤢𞥄𞤥𞤭𞥅𞤩𞤫), derived from the verbal root laamu- meaning "leadership", and hence may be translated more specifically as "leader". The title laamiiɗo is higher in rank than laamɗo, which means simply a "leader" or "king". Therefore, "laamiiɗo" means a "great king" or "great leader". It has been used by the traditional leaders of certain Fulani emirates in West Africa, originally as head of confederations of ruling and subordinate (often vassal) states. Its use persists within a number of post-colonial republics.

The word may have its origins from the old Serer title lamane (or laman) which means master of the land, inheritor or heir in old Serer (Fula and Serer are closely related languages). The Lamans were the ancient Serer kings before the fall of the Serer lamanic class in the 14th century. The Fula title Lam Toro—who later became leaders of Futa Toro, originated from the Serer title Laman.

== States where the title "lamido" was used ==
Examples of Fulani Jihad states:

- Bauchi Emirate, since its foundation in 1805.
- Adamawa Emirate (Fombina), since its foundation in 1809.
- Bibemi, since its 1770 foundation, until the higher Muslim title Sultan was assumed
- Lamidat of Rey Bouba, since its foundation in 1804

== Compound title ==
- Laamiiɗo juulɓe 'Emir of the Muslims (𞤂𞤢𞥄𞤥𞤭𞥅𞤯𞤮 𞤶𞤵𞥅𞤤𞤦𞤫, lit. those who pray)' was a title, alongside the proper Arabic Amir al-Mu´minin (which was maintained), of the Imam `Usuman dan Muhammad Fodio, the original leader of the largest of the Fula jihads (conquests by the Fula people in the name of spreading Islam) in Sokoto, the home state of the leader of the Fulbe jihad, whose heirs (since 1817) adopted the title Sarkin Musulmi and became known as Sultan of Sokoto, still considered the paramount ruler of traditional Islamic people in Nigeria
- Baban-Lamido in Adamawa (now partially in Cameroon) since its foundation in 1809

== Sources ==
- WorldStatesmen
