= 2023 Gombe State gubernatorial election =

2023 gubernatorial election in Gombe State, Nigeria

- 18 March 2023
- Registered: 1,575,794
Nominee	Muhammad Inuwa Yahaya	Mohammed Jibrin Barde
Party	APC	PDP
Running mate	Manasseh Daniel Jatau	Timothy Danlele
Popular vote	342,821	233,131
Percentage	56.63%	38.51%
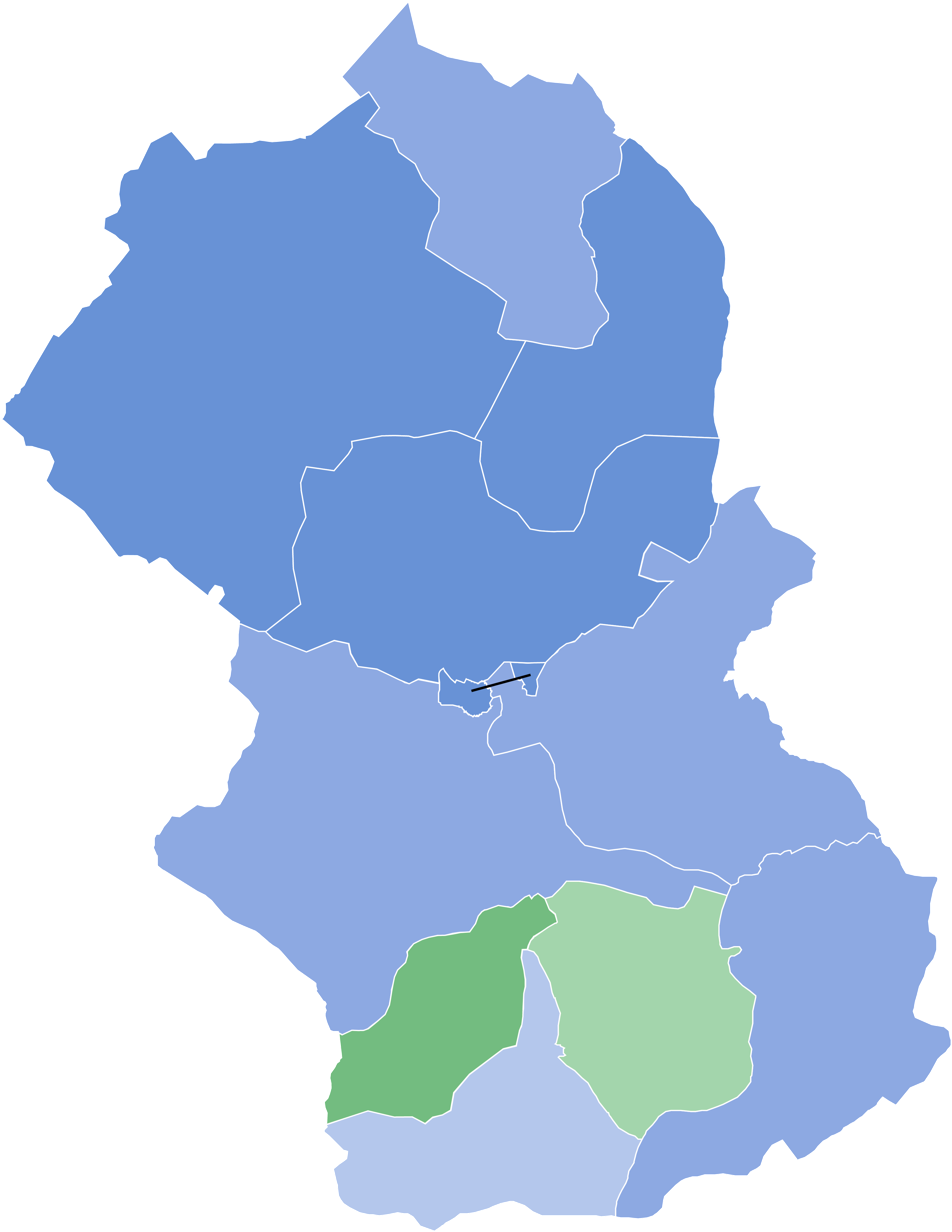
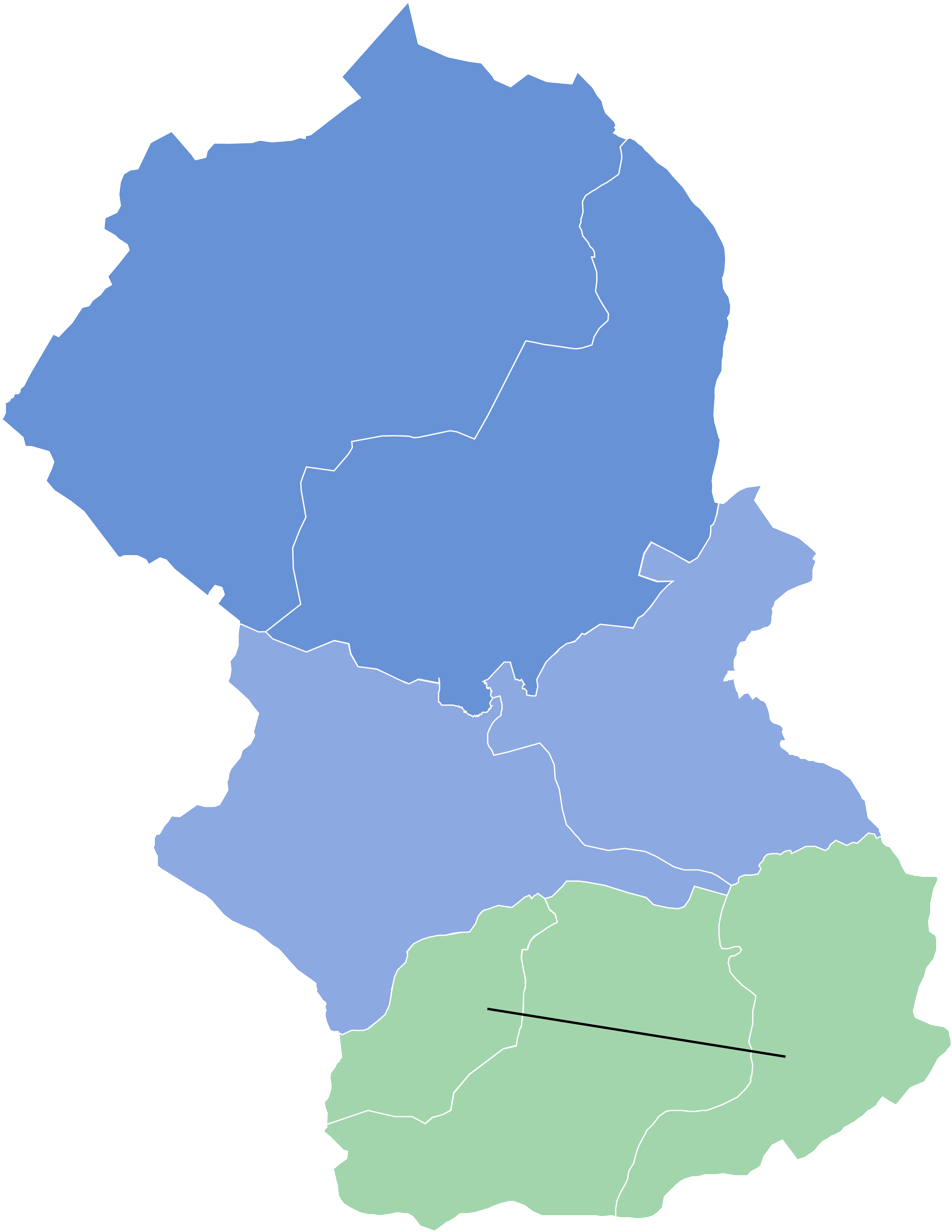
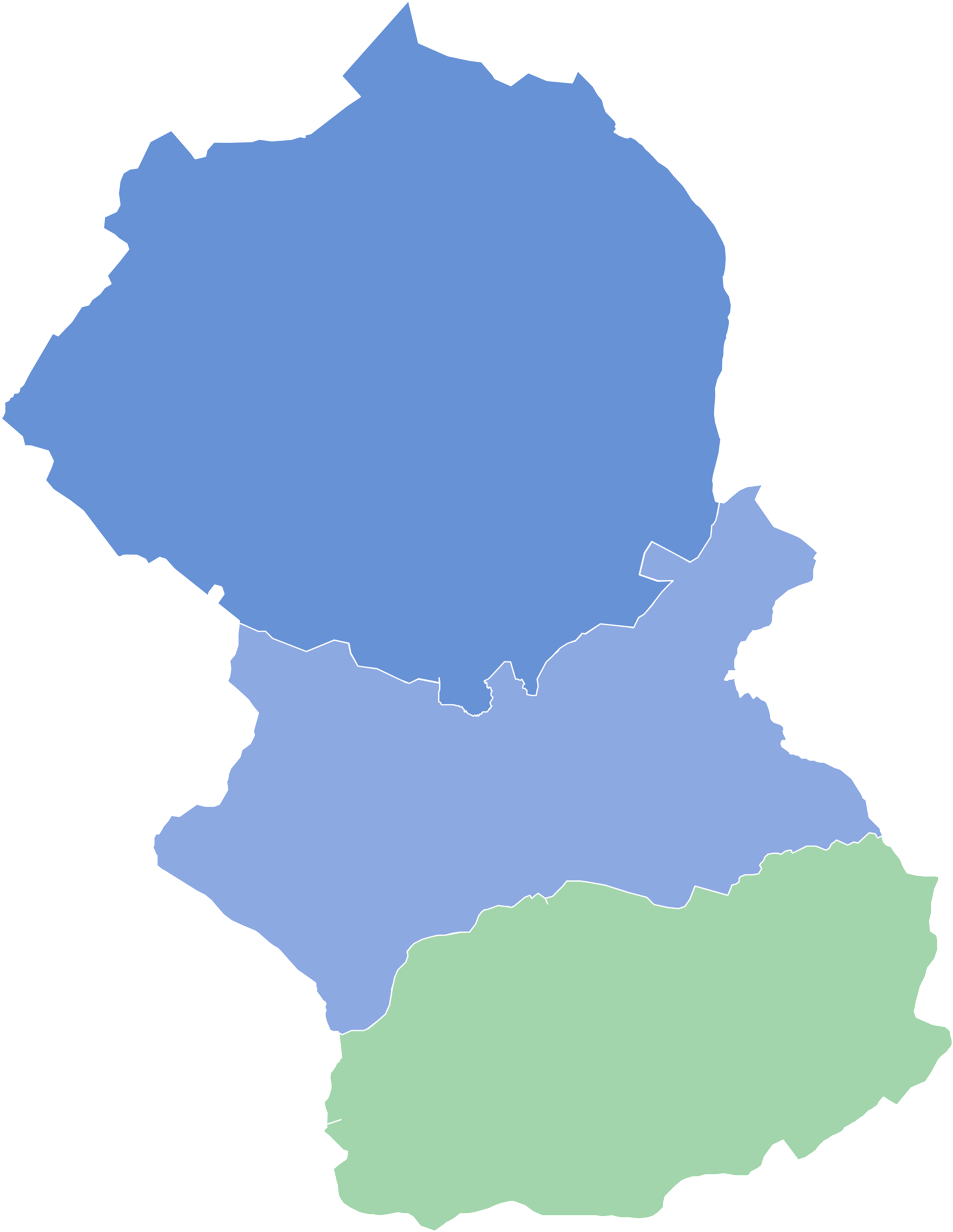
- Yahaya: 40–50% 50–60% 60–70% Jibrin: 40–50% 50–60%
Governor before election
Muhammad Inuwa Yahaya
APC
Elected Governor
Muhammad Inuwa Yahaya
APC

The 2023 Gombe State gubernatorial election was held on 18 March 2023, to elect the Governor of Gombe State, concurrent with elections to the Gombe State House of Assembly as well as twenty-seven other gubernatorial elections and elections to all other state houses of assembly. The election — which was postponed from its original 11 March date — was held three weeks after the presidential election and National Assembly elections. Incumbent APC Governor Muhammad Inuwa Yahaya was re-elected by a margin of 18% over PDP nominee, businessman Mohammed Jibrin Barde.

The primaries, scheduled for between 4 April and 9 June 2022, resulted in Yahaya being renominated by the All Progressives Congress unopposed on 26 May while the Peoples Democratic Party nominated businessman Jibrin on 25 May.

The day after Election Day, collation completed and INEC declared Yahaya as the victor. In total, Yahaya won nearly 343,000 votes and 57% of the vote while runner-up Jibrin received about 233,000 votes and 39% of the vote. Jibrin rejected the official results and filed legal challenges; the case eventually reached the Supreme Court, which affirmed the victory of Yahaya in a judgment in January 2024.

== Electoral system ==
The Governor of Gombe State is elected using a modified two-round system. To be elected in the first round, a candidate must receive the plurality of the vote and over 25% of the vote in at least two-thirds of state local government areas. If no candidate passes this threshold, a second round will be held between the top candidate and the next candidate to have received a plurality of votes in the highest number of local government areas.

== Background ==
Gombe State is a small, diverse northeastern state with a growing economy and vast natural areas but facing an underdeveloped yet vital agricultural sector, desertification, and some inter-ethnic violence.

Politically, the state's 2019 elections were categorized by a large swing towards the state APC. In federal elections, Buhari held the state for the APC while the APC swept all senate seats by gaining two PDP-held seats. Similarly, the APC gained two PDP-held House seats to sweep all House of Representatives elections. On the state level, the APC gained the governorship and the majority in the House of Assembly. The 2019 elections also bridged the political divide between the diverse, Christian-majority Southern region and the mainly Hausa and Fulani, Muslim-majority Northern and Central regions as the former region moved towards the APC in tandem with the latter two regions. During the 2019 to 2023 term, defections rose the PDP's numbers in the federal House while increasing APC numbers in the state assembly.

Over the course of Yahaya's term, his administration stated focuses included education, security, healthcare, and agriculture development. In terms of his performance, Yahaya was praised for healthcare development and high ease of doing business but was criticized for do-nothingness during his first year in office, lack of regular and clean drinking water, the arrests of his critics, and poor handling of the 2021 Mai Tangale appointment which led to deadly religious clashes in Billiri.

== Primary elections ==
The primaries, along with any potential challenges to primary results, were to take place between 4 April and 3 June 2022 but the deadline was extended to 9 June.

=== All Progressives Congress ===
The year ahead of the APC primary was categorized by a party crisis as the state APC was split between supporters of Senator and former Governor Mohammed Danjuma Goje on one side and the other side supporting incumbent Governor Muhammad Inuwa Yahaya. The crisis forced party officials to take a side and even became violent when an attack on Goje's convoy killed 5 people in November 2021. The crisis also led to some defections from the party, notably when 2019 gubernatorial candidate Jamil Isyaku Gwamna and House of Representatives member Yaya Bauchi Tango both went to the PDP. Although neither Goje nor Yahaya themselves defected, analysts stated that the prolonged party crisis and others' defections could to hurt the APC in the general election.

On 20 April 2022, the APC National Executive Committee announced the party's schedule for gubernatorial primaries, setting its expression of interest form price at ₦10 million and nomination form price at ₦40 million with a 50% nomination form discount for candidates younger than 40 while women and candidates with disabilities get free nomination forms. Forms were to be sold from 26 April to 6 May until the deadline was later extended to 10 May then 12 May. After the submission of nomination forms by 13 May, candidates were screened by a party committee on 14 and 15 May while 16 May was the date for the screening appeal process. Ward congresses and LGA congresses were set for between 7 and 9 May to elect delegates for the primary. Candidates approved by the screening process advanced to a primary set for 26 May, in concurrence with other APC gubernatorial primaries; challenges to the result could be made the next day.

On the primary date, Yahaya was the sole candidate and won the nomination by voice vote unopposed. In his acceptance speech, Yahaya thanked the party and President Muhammadu Buhari while pledging to continue the work of his administration.

==== Nominated ====
- Muhammad Inuwa Yahaya: Governor (2019–present), 2015 APC gubernatorial nominee, and former commissioner
  - Running mate—Manasseh Daniel Jatau: Deputy Governor (2019–present)

==== Declined ====
- Isa Ali Pantami: Minister of Communications and Digital Economy (2019–present)

==== Results ====
APC primary results
Party	Candidate	Votes	%
APC	Muhammad Inuwa Yahaya	Voice vote	100.00%
Total votes		N/A	100.00%
Turnout		563	98.77%

=== People's Democratic Party ===
On 16 March 2022, the national PDP announced its gubernatorial primaries' schedule, setting its expression of interest form price at ₦1 million and the nomination form price at ₦20 million with a 50% discount for candidates between 25 and 30. Forms were to be sold until 1 April but the party later extended the deadline four times before reaching a final deadline of 22 April. After the submission of nomination forms by 25 April, candidates were screened by a party committee on 28 April while 2 May was the rescheduled date for the screening appeal process. Ward congresses were set for 29 April and LGA congresses were rescheduled for 10 May to elect delegates for the primary. Candidates approved by the screening process advanced to a primary set for 25 May, in concurrence with all other PDP gubernatorial primaries; challenges to the result could be made in the following days.

Ahead of the primary, the main questions were around which candidate would receive the support of de facto Gombe PDP leader Ibrahim Hassan Dankwambo along with those perceived as having helped the party since entering opposition in 2019. On the primary date, the six candidates contested an indirect primary that ended with Mohammed Jibrin emerging as the PDP nominee after results showed Jibrin winning just under 50% of the delegates' votes. In late June, Jibrin picked Timothy Danlele—a retired civil servant—as his running mate.

==== Nominated ====
- Mohammed Jibrin Barde: 2019 APC gubernatorial candidate and banker
  - Running mate—Timothy Danlele: former civil servant

==== Eliminated in primary ====
- Abubakar Ali Gombe: former Minister of State for Health
- Babayo Ardo: civil servant
- Jamil Isyaku Gwamna: MD/CEO of the Kano Electricity Distribution Company and 2019 PDP gubernatorial candidate
- Adamu Suleiman: former Air Force air vice marshal
- Gimba Ya'u Kumo: former Managing Director/CEO of the Federal Mortgage Bank of Nigeria and son-in-law of President Muhammadu Buhari

==== Declined ====
- Usman Bayero Nafada: former Senator for Gombe North (2015–2019), 2019 PDP gubernatorial nominee, former House of Representatives member for Dukku/Nafada (2003–2015), former Deputy Speaker of the House of Representatives, former House of Assembly member, and former Speaker of the House of Assembly

==== Results ====
Candidates' vote share
1. Muhammad Jibrin Barde (48.8%)
2. Jamil Isyaku Gwamna (36.3%)
3. Adamu Suleiman (5.49%)
4. Abubakar Ali Gombe (5.18%)
5. Other candidates (4.26%)

PDP primary results
Party	Candidate	Votes	%
PDP	Mohammed Jibrin Barde	160	48.78%
PDP	Jamil Isyaku Gwamna	119	36.28%
PDP	Adamu Suleiman	18	5.49%
PDP	Abubakar Ali Gombe	17	5.18%
PDP	Babayo Ardo	13	3.96%
PDP	Gimba Ya'u Kumo	1	0.30%
Total votes		328	100.00%

=== Minor parties ===
- Nuhu Milah (Action Alliance)
  - Running mate: Idris Musa
- Jibrin Suleiman (Action Democratic Party)
  - Running mate: Mohammed Magaji
- Mohammed Adamu (Action Peoples Party)
  - Running mate: Aliyu Alhaji Liman
- Aliyu Danmacca Adamu (African Action Congress)
  - Running mate: Mariyatu Sulaiman Aliyu
- Bala Nafiu (African Democratic Congress)
  - Running mate: Erisa Sarki Danladi
- Bello Abubakar Muhammad (Allied Peoples Movement)
  - Running mate: Abubakar Rabi Chindo
- Abdulhamid Sadiq (Boot Party)
  - Running mate: Zariyatu Yunusa
- Keftin Esau Amuga (Labour Party)
  - Running mate: Saleh Lawan
- Khamisu Mailantarki (New Nigeria Peoples Party)
  - Running mate: Hamma Abubakar
- Abubakar Sanusi Sulaiman (National Rescue Movement)
  - Running mate: Ladidi Okasha
- Kelmi Jacob Lazarus (Social Democratic Party)
  - Running mate: Ali Ajasco Muhammed
- Muhammad Gana Aliyu (Zenith Labour Party)
  - Running mate: Hope Emmanuel

== Campaign ==
Immediately after the primaries in June 2022, observers stated that the nominees were focusing on unifying their respective parties. Although the main feud between Yahaya and Senator Mohammed Danjuma Goje ended before the primaries, Goje's indifference to campaigning for Yahaya if he remained aggrieved began to be viewed as a potential liability for the APC by pundits while analysts noted that the PDP was concerned about the internal APC truce. A few months later in November, analysis again focused on internal party divides as Goje remained absent from Yahaya's campaign while Jibrin had sided with Rivers State Governor Nyesom Wike in his dispute with PDP presidential nominee Atiku Abubakar. The PDP divide had greatly escalated after a leaked audio alleged showed Jibrin insulting opposing PDP figures coupled with pre-existing tension between Jibrin and primary runner-up Jamil Isyaku Gwamna. Despite reconciliation attempts, Gwamna left the PDP in early December with groups of supporters to rejoin the APC amid a wave of departures from the PDP throughout December.

Just days after the presidential election—in which PDP nominee Atiku Abubakar won Gombe State, Yahaya issued a broad apology to the state's Christian community during a meeting organised by the Gombe CAN chapter. In the presidential election, predominantly Christian areas like Billiri had mainly voted for PDP nominee Atiku Abubakar and LP nominee Peter Obi in the wake of years of criticism of the Gombe APC for alleged anti-Christian discrimination, most notably during the 2020 Chief Judge scandal (Note: The Yahaya administration allegedly refused to nominate the state's most senior judge — Justice Beatrice Iliya — to be state Chief Judge due to her Christian faith.) and the 2021 Mai Tangale crisis. (Note: Yahaya's selection of a Muslim to become traditional leader over a mainly-Christian area which sparked months of protests and unrest.) Nevertheless, the EiE-SBM forecast projected Jibrin to win based on "events in the presidential election and the end of Muhammadu Buhari’s influence on northern politics." On the other hand, a piece from Leadership noted that Khamisu Mailantarki (NNPP) could split the opposition vote.

== Projections ==
Source	Projection	As of
Africa Elects (Note: AfricaElects projections predict the likelihood of a candidate winning a state by categorizing a state as "Safe" for exceedingly likely, "Likely" for somewhat likely, and "Lean" for least likely. If no clear determination could be made, states are categorized as "tossups".)	Lean Jibrin	17 March 2023
Enough is Enough- SBM Intelligence (Note: EiE-SBM projections predict which candidates will win states.)	Jibrin	2 March 2023

== Conduct ==
=== Electoral timetable ===
On 26 February 2022, the Independent National Electoral Commission released the timetable, setting out key dates and deadlines for the election. Months later on 27 May 2022, INEC made a slight revision to the timetable, allowing parties extra time to conduct primaries.

- 28 February 2022 – Publication of Notice of Election
- 4 April 2022 – First day for the conduct of party primaries
- 9 June 2022 (Note: The original deadline was 3 June; however, INEC pushed it back to 9 June at the behest of parties.) – Final day for the conduct of party primaries, including the resolution of disputes arising from them
- 1 July 2022 – First day for submission of nomination forms to INEC via the online portal
- 15 July 2022 – Final day for submission of nomination forms to INEC via the online portal
- 12 October 2022 – Commencement of the official campaign period
- 16 March 2023 (Note: The original deadline was 9 March; however, INEC pushed it back to 16 March.) – Final day of the official campaign period

=== Pre-election ===
For the Nigeria Police Force, Oqua Etim — the Commissioner of the Gombe State Command — met with community figures ahead of the election in addition to hosting a peace meeting with religious leaders. A police statement on 16 March announced the deployment of reinforcements from several tactical units along with the allocation of more vehicles, personnel protective gadgets, anti-riot equipment, and armored personnel carriers; the following day, another statement ordered restrictions on movement for Election Day.

== General election ==
=== Results ===
Candidates' vote share
1. Muhammad Inuwa Yahaya (APC) (56.6%)
2. Mohammed Jibrin Barde (PDP) (38.5%)
3. Other candidates (4.86%)

2023 Gombe State gubernatorial election
Party	Candidate	Votes	%
AA	Nuhu Milah		
ADP	Jibrin Suleiman		
APP	Mohammed Adamu		
AAC	Aliyu Danmacca Adamu		
ADC	Bala Nafiu		
APM	Bello Abubakar Muhammad		
APC	Muhammad Inuwa Yahaya		
BP	Abdulhamid Sadiq		
LP	Keftin Esau Amuga		
New Nigeria Peoples Party	Khamisu Mailantarki		
NRM	Abubakar Sanusi Sulaiman		
PDP	Mohammed Jibrin		
SDP	Kelmi Jacob Lazarus		
ZLP	Muhammad Gana Aliyu		
Total votes			100.00%
Invalid or blank votes			N/A
Turnout			

==== By senatorial district ====
Percentage of the vote won by each major candidate by district.

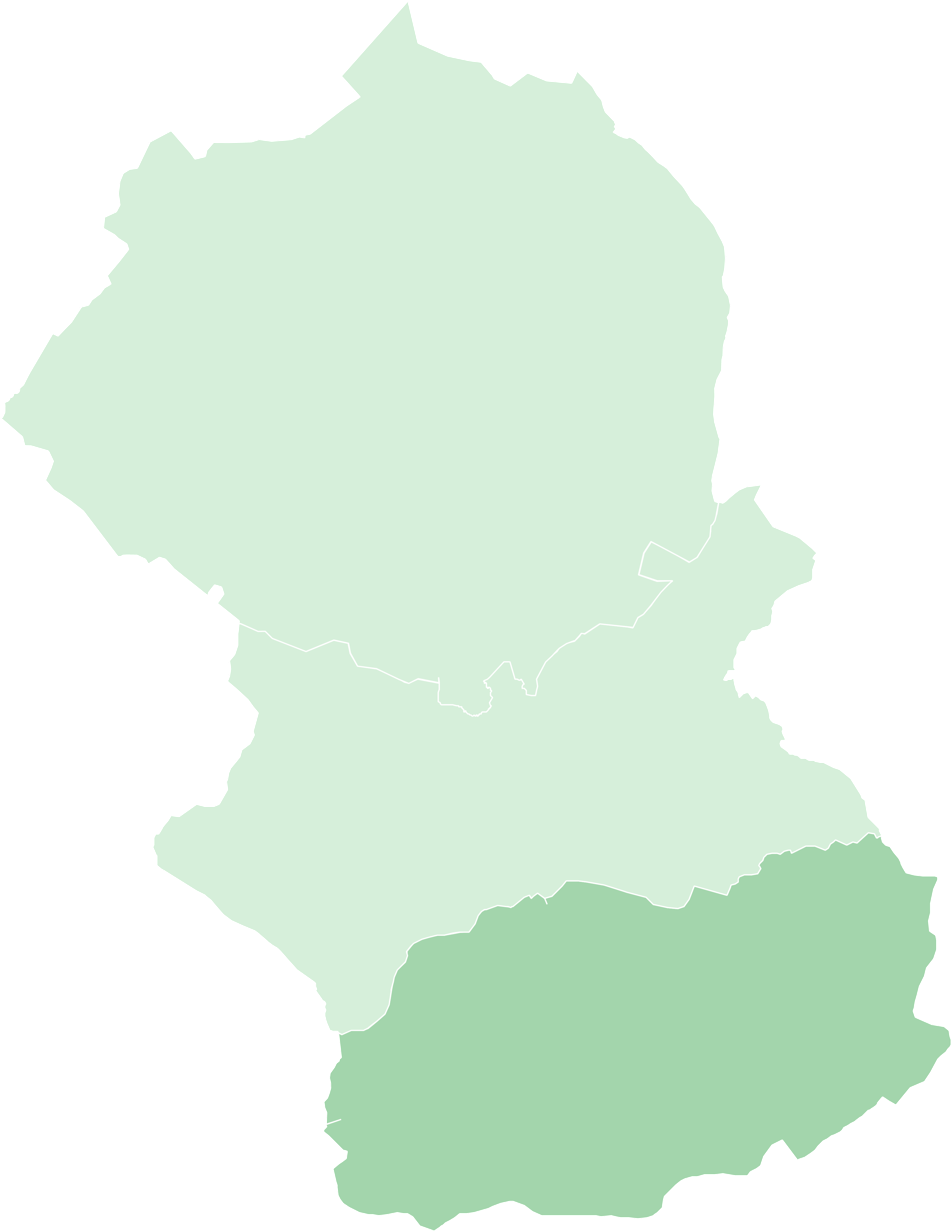
Jibrin; 30–40% 40–50%

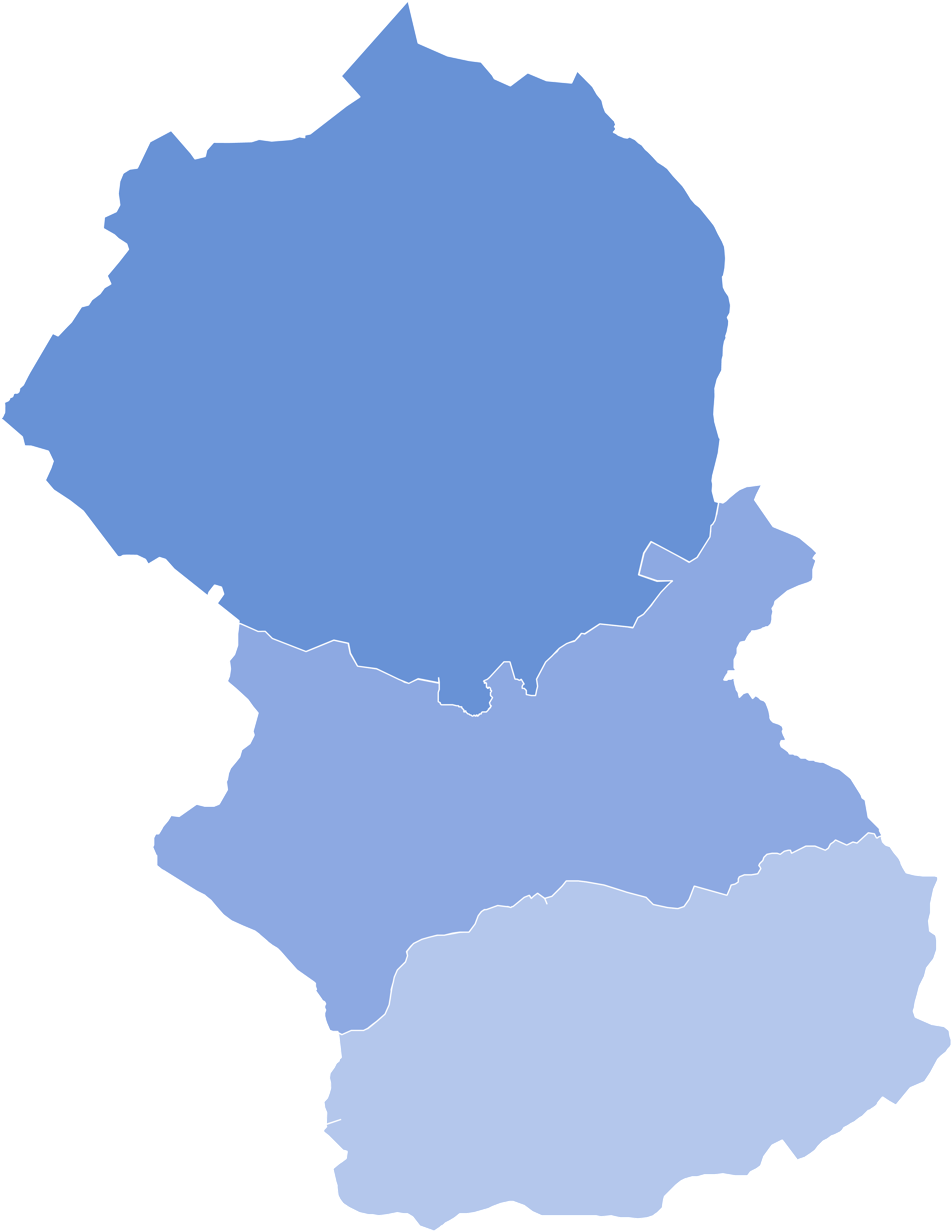
Yahaya; 40–50% 50–60% 60–70%

The results of the election by senatorial district.

Senatorial District	Muhammad Inuwa Yahaya APC		Mohammed Jibrin PDP		Others		Total Valid Votes
Senatorial District	Votes	Percentage	Votes	Percentage	Votes	Percentage	Total Valid Votes
Gombe Central Senatorial District (Note: Comprising the local government areas of Akko and Yamaltu/Deba.)	94,900	56.59%	65,297	38.94%	7,490	4.47%	167,687
Gombe North Senatorial District (Note: Comprising the local government areas of Dukku, Funakaye, Gombe, Kwami, and Nafada.)	173,204	62.96%	89,950	32.69%	11,966	4.35%	275,120
Gombe South Senatorial District (Note: Comprising the local government areas of Balanga, Billiri, Kaltungo, and Shongom.)	74,717	45.97%	77,884	47.91%	9,947	6.12%	162,548
Totals	342,821	56.63%	233,131	38.51%	29,403	4.86%	605,355

==== By federal constituency ====
Percentage of the vote won by each major candidate by constituency.

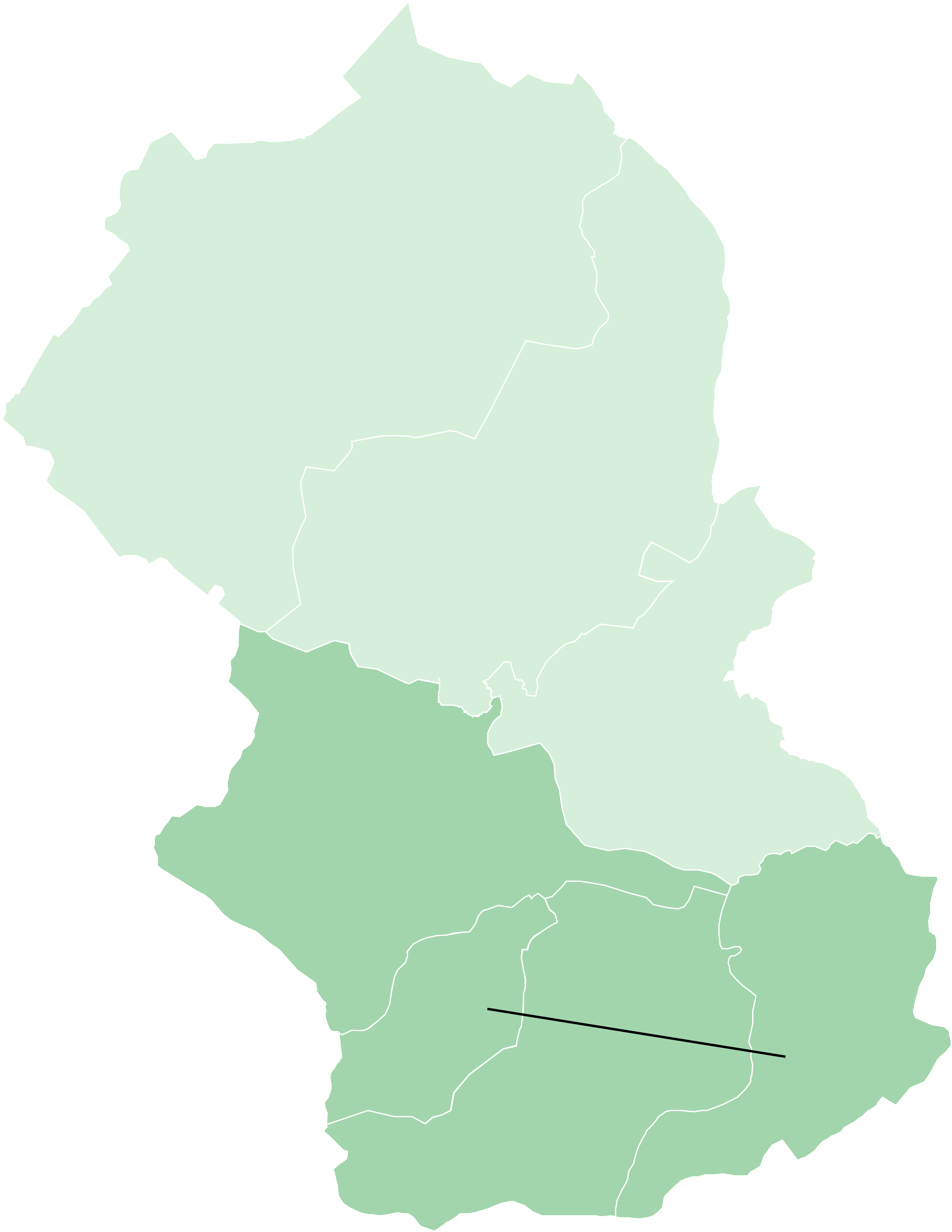
Jibrin; 30–40% 40–50%

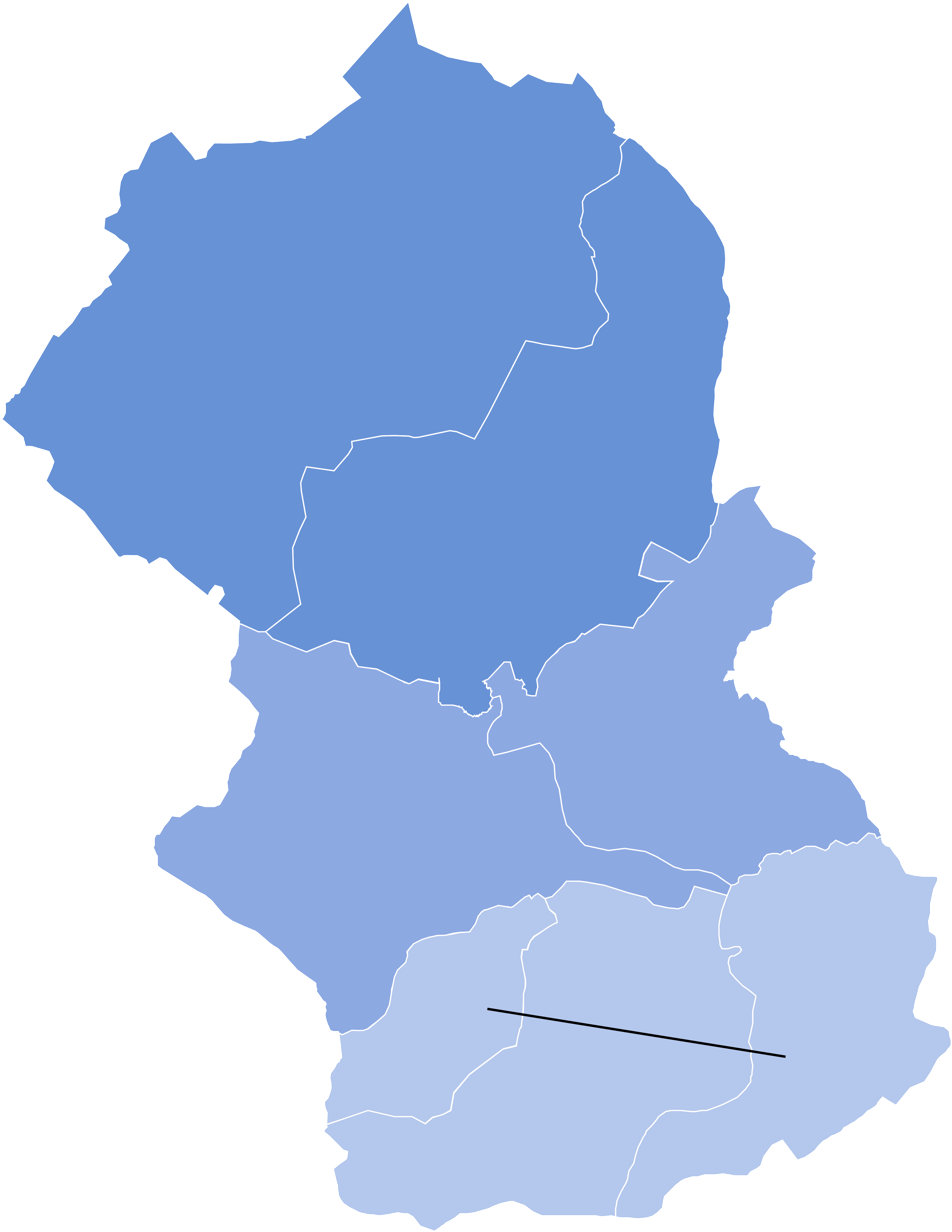
Yahaya; 40–50% 50–60% 60–70%

The results of the election by federal constituency.

Federal Constituency	Muhammad Inuwa Yahaya APC		Mohammed Jibrin PDP		Others		Total Valid Votes
Federal Constituency	Votes	Percentage	Votes	Percentage	Votes	Percentage	Total Valid Votes
Akko Federal Constituency (Note: Comprising the local government area of Akko.)	50,919	55.47%	36,759	40.05%	4,111	4.48%	91,789
Balanga/Billiri Federal Constituency (Note: Comprising the local government areas of Balanga and Billiri.)	40,093	44.49%	43,151	47.88%	6,872	7.63%	90,116
Dukku/Nafada Federal Constituency (Note: Comprising the local government areas of Dukku and Nafada.)	50,232	65.53%	23,559	30.73%	2,866	3.74%	76,657
Gombe/Kwami/Funakaye Federal Constituency (Note: Comprising the local government areas of Gombe, Kwami, and Funakaye.)	122,972	61.96%	66,391	33.45%	9,100	4.59%	198,463
Kaltungo/Shongom Federal Constituency (Note: Comprising the local government areas of Kaltungo and Shongom.)	34,624	47.80%	34,733	47.95%	3,075	4.25%	72,432
Yamaltu/Deba Federal Constituency (Note: Comprising the local government area of Yamaltu/Deba.)	43,981	57.95%	28,538	37.60%	3,379	4.45%	75,898
Totals	342,821	56.63%	233,131	38.51%	29,403	4.86%	605,355

==== By local government area ====
The results of the election by local government area.

LGA	Muhammad Inuwa Yahaya APC		Mohammed Jibrin PDP		Others		Total Valid Votes	Turnout Percentage
LGA	Votes	Percentage	Votes	Percentage	Votes	Percentage	Total Valid Votes	Turnout Percentage
Akko	50,919	55.47%	36,759	40.05%	4,111	4.48%	91,789	39.18%
Balanga	25,341	53.33%	20,085	42.27%	2,091	4.40%	47,517	35.40%
Billiri	14,752	34.63%	23,066	54.15%	4,781	11.22%	42,599	37.40%
Dukku	35,207	68.29%	14,181	27.51%	2,165	4.20%	51,553	43.76%
Funakaye	30,371	62.34%	17,332	35.57%	1,018	2.09%	48,721	39.24%
Gombe	58,645	60.61%	31,605	32.67%	6,501	6.72%	96,751	39.85%
Kaltungo	21,015	47.60%	21,321	48.29%	1,817	4.12%	44,153	34.04%
Kwami	33,956	64.08%	17,454	32.94%	1,581	2.98%	52,991	44.17%
Nafada	15,025	59.85%	9,378	37.36%	701	2.79%	25,104	40.85%
Shongom	13,609	48.12%	13,412	47.43%	1,258	4.45%	28,279	40.45%
Yamaltu/Deba	43,981	57.95%	28,538	37.60%	3,379	4.45%	75,898	38.96%
Totals	342,821	56.63%	233,131	38.51%	29,403	4.86%	605,355	39.23%

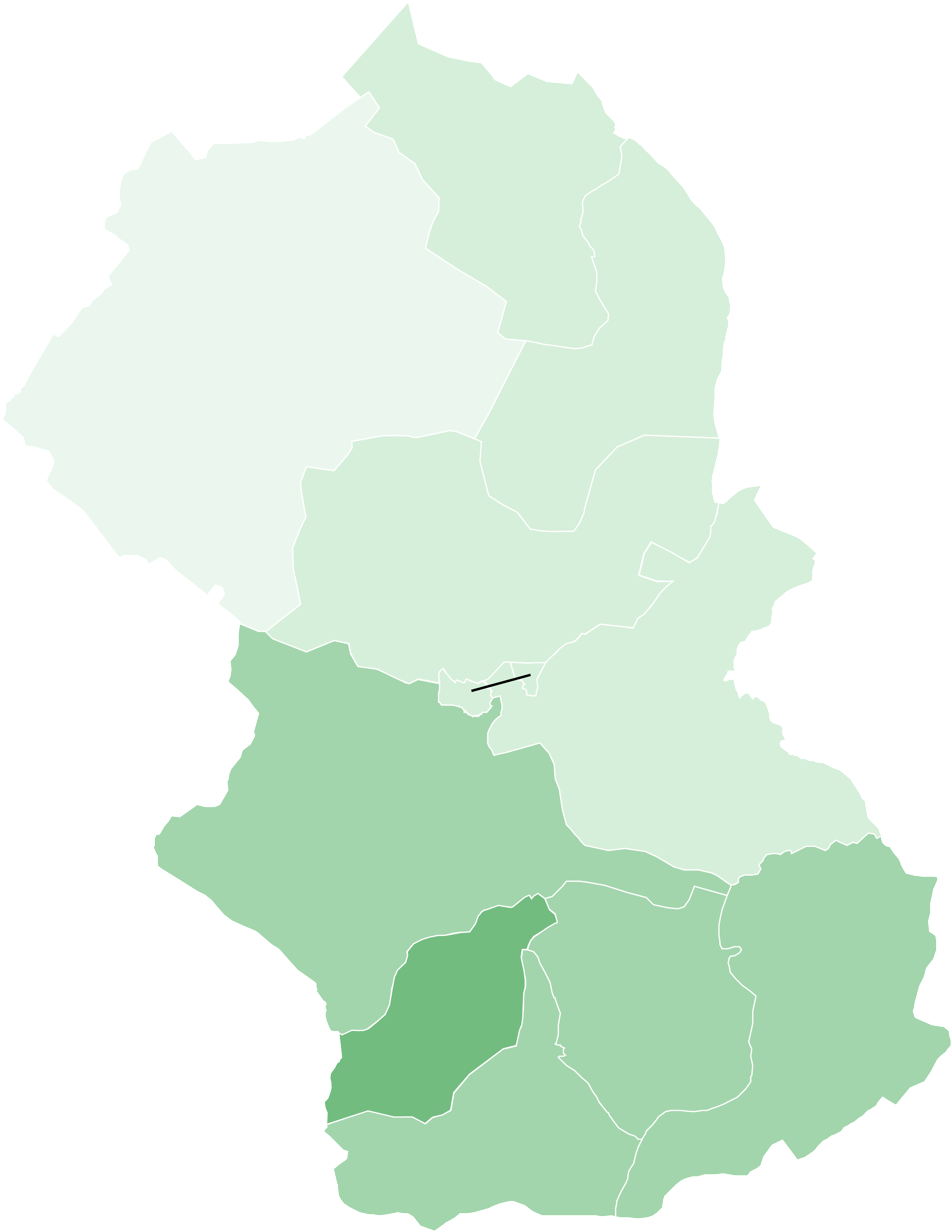
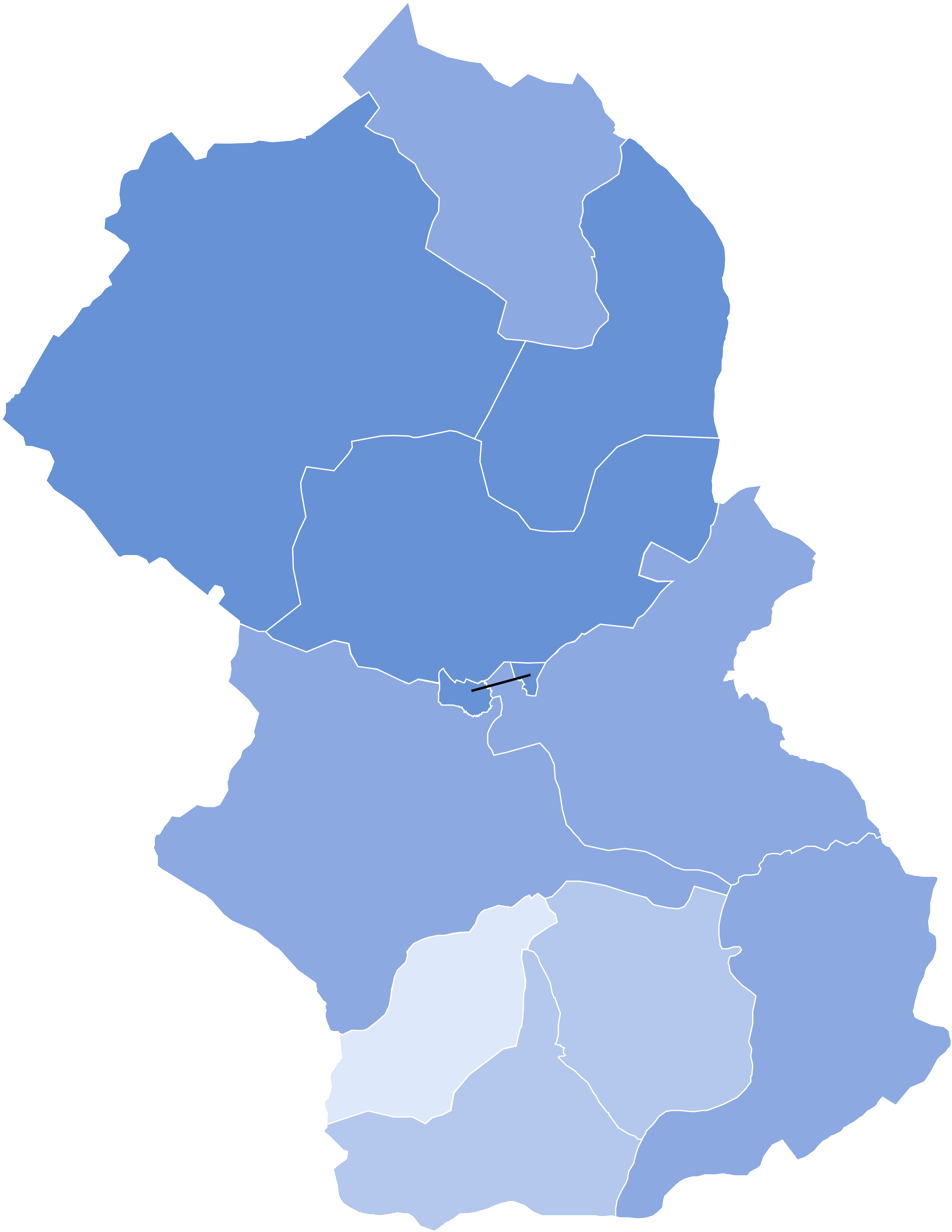
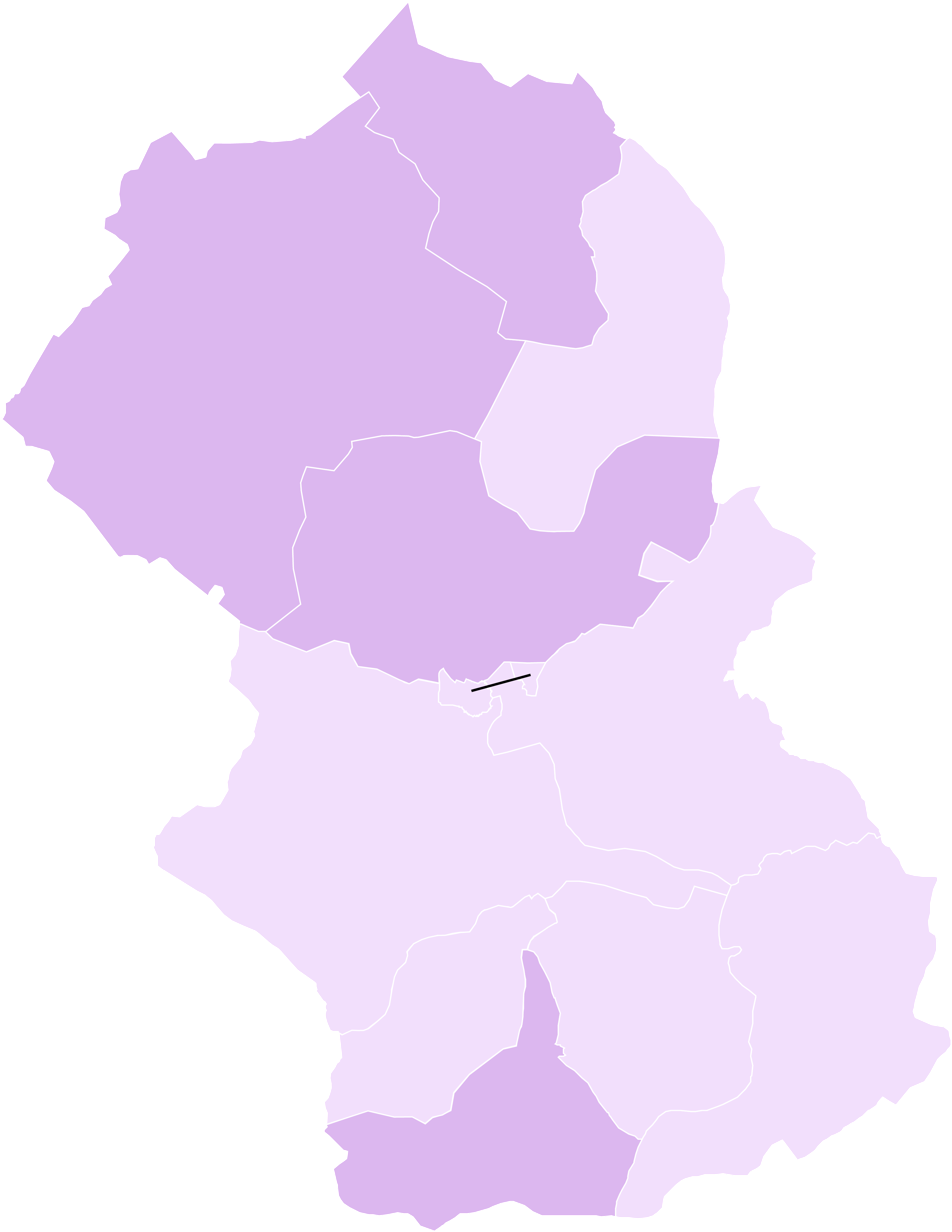
Percentage of the vote won by each major candidate by LGA.		Turnout Percentage by LGA
Jibrin <30% 30–40% 40–50% 50–60%	Yahaya; 30–40% 40–50% 50–60% 60–70%	Turnout; 30–40% 40–50%

===== Close local government areas =====
Local government areas where the margin of victory was under 1%:

1. Kaltungo, 0.69% (306 votes) margin for Jibrin
2. Shongom, 0.69% (197 votes) margin for Yahaya

== See also ==
- 2023 Nigerian elections
- 2023 Nigerian gubernatorial elections
