= 2023 Nigerian presidential election in Gombe State =

- 25 February 2023
- Registered: 1,575,794
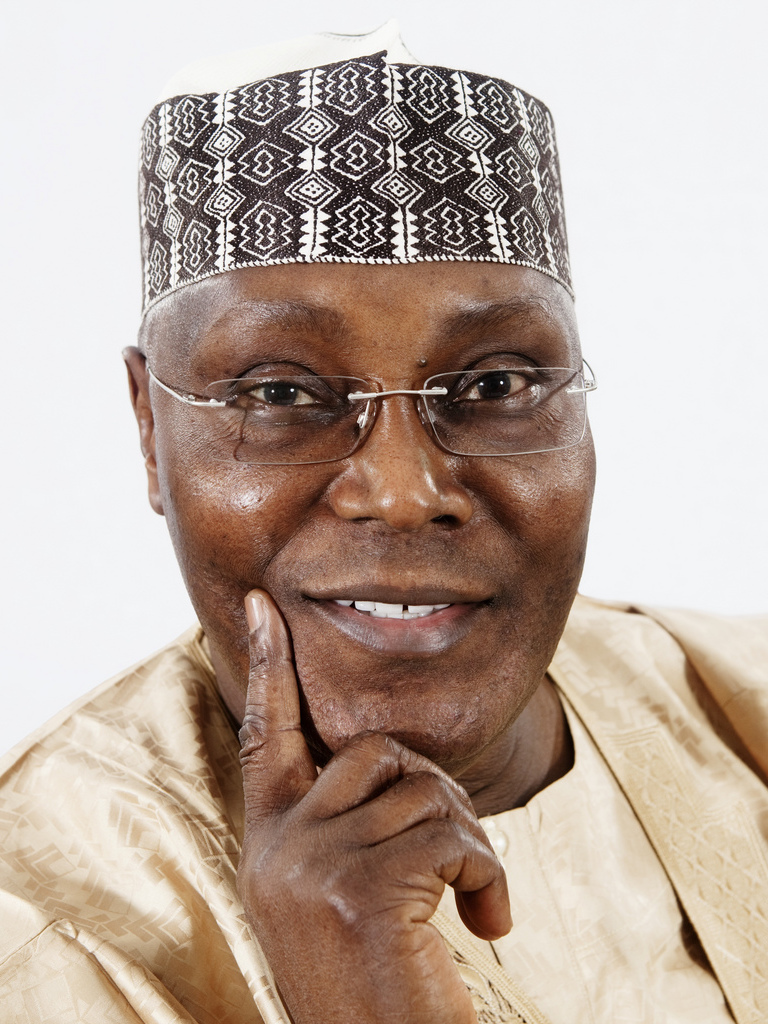

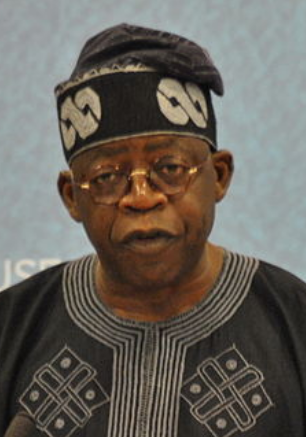

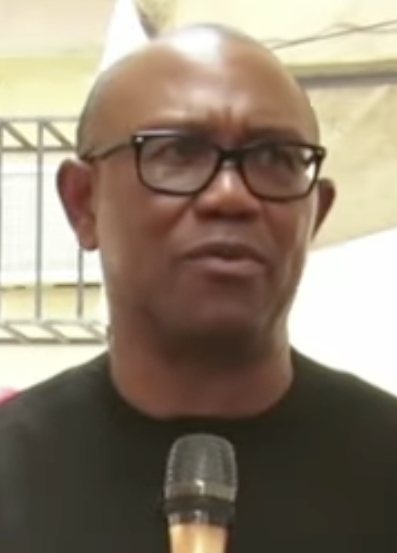
Nominee	Atiku Abubakar	Bola Tinubu
Party	PDP	APC
Home state	Adamawa	Lagos
Running mate	Ifeanyi Okowa	Kashim Shettima
Popular vote	319,123	146,977
Percentage	62.57%	28.82%
Nominee	Peter Obi	Rabiu Kwankwaso
Party	LP	New Nigeria Peoples Party
Home state	Anambra	Kano
Running mate	Yusuf Datti Baba-Ahmed	Isaac Idahosa
Popular vote	26,160	10,520
Percentage	5.13%	2.06%
President before election
Muhammadu Buhari
APC
Elected President
TBD

The 2023 Nigerian presidential election in Gombe State was held on 25 February 2023 as part of the nationwide 2023 Nigerian presidential election to elect the president and vice president of Nigeria. Other federal elections, including elections to the House of Representatives and the Senate, will also be held on the same date while state elections will be held two weeks afterward on 11 March.

== Background ==
Gombe State is a small, diverse northeastern state with a growing economy and vast natural areas but facing an underdeveloped yet vital agricultural sector, desertification, and some inter-ethnic violence. Politically, the state's 2019 elections were categorized by a large swing towards the state APC. In federal elections, Buhari held the state for the APC while the APC swept all senate seats by gaining two PDP-held seats. Similarly, the APC gained two PDP-held House seats to sweep all House of Representatives elections. On the state level, the APC gained the governorship and the majority in the House of Assembly. The 2019 elections also bridged the political divide between the diverse, Christian-majority Southern region and the mainly Hausa and Fulani, Muslim-majority Northern and Central regions as the former region moved towards the APC in tandem with the latter two regions.

== Polling ==
Polling organisation/client	Fieldwork date	Sample size					Others	Undecided	Undisclosed	Not voting
Polling organisation/client	Fieldwork date	Sample size	Tinubu APC	Obi LP	Kwankwaso NNPP	Abubakar PDP	Others	Undecided	Undisclosed	Not voting
BantuPage	December 2022	N/A	4%	16%	4%	48%	–	28%	0%	0%
Nextier (Gombe crosstabs of national poll)	27 January 2023	N/A	41.2%	7.8%	11.8%	35.3%	3.9%	–	–	–
SBM Intelligence for EiE (Gombe crosstabs of national poll)	22 January-6 February 2023	N/A	6%	20%	1%	56%	2%	15%	–	–

== Projections ==
Source	Projection		As of
Africa Elects (Note: Africa Elects projections predict the likelihood of a candidate winning a state by categorizing a state as "Safe" for exceedingly likely, "Likely" for somewhat likely, and "Lean" for least likely. If no clear determination could be made, states are categorized as "tossups".)	Likely Abubakar		24 February 2023
Dataphyte (Note: Dataphyte projections predict candidates' projected votal shares in each state.)
Dataphyte	Tinubu:	39.05%	11 February 2023
Dataphyte	Obi:	11.95%	11 February 2023
Dataphyte	Abubakar:	39.05%	11 February 2023
Dataphyte	Others:	9.95%	11 February 2023
Enough is Enough- SBM Intelligence (Note: EiE-SBM projections predict which candidates will win states.)	Abubakar		17 February 2023
SBM Intelligence (Note: SBM projections predict which candidates will win states or, if no determination could be made, categorizes states as "Too close to call" (TCC).)	Abubakar		15 December 2022
ThisDay (Note: ThisDay projections predict candidates' projected votal shares in each state.)
ThisDay	Tinubu:	20%	27 December 2022
ThisDay	Obi:	15%	27 December 2022
ThisDay	Kwankwaso:	5%	27 December 2022
ThisDay	Abubakar:	40%	27 December 2022
ThisDay	Others/Undecided:	20%	27 December 2022
The Nation (Note: The Nation projections predict which candidates will win states or, if no determination could be made, categorizes states as "Battlegrounds.")	Tinubu		12-19 February 2023

== General election ==
=== Results ===
2023 Nigerian presidential election in Gombe State
Party	Candidate	Votes	%
A	Christopher Imumolen		
AA	Hamza al-Mustapha		
ADP	Yabagi Sani		
APP	Osita Nnadi		
AAC	Omoyele Sowore		
ADC	Dumebi Kachikwu		
APC	Bola Tinubu		
APGA	Peter Umeadi		
APM	Princess Chichi Ojei		
BP	Sunday Adenuga		
LP	Peter Obi		
NRM	Felix Johnson Osakwe		
New Nigeria Peoples Party	Rabiu Kwankwaso		
PRP	Kola Abiola		
PDP	Atiku Abubakar		
SDP	Adewole Adebayo		
YPP	Malik Ado-Ibrahim		
ZLP	Dan Nwanyanwu		
Total votes			100.00%
Invalid or blank votes			N/A
Turnout			

==== By senatorial district ====
The results of the election by senatorial district.

Senatorial district	Bola Tinubu APC		Atiku Abubakar PDP		Peter Obi LP		Rabiu Kwankwaso NNPP		Others		Total valid votes
Senatorial district	Votes	%	Votes	%	Votes	%	Votes	%	Votes	%	Total valid votes
Gombe Central Senatorial District (Note: Comprising the local government areas of Akko and Yamaltu/Deba.)	TBD	%	TBD	%	TBD	%	TBD	%	TBD	%	TBD
Gombe North Senatorial District (Note: Comprising the local government areas of Dukku, Funakaye, Gombe, Kwami, and Nafada.)	TBD	%	TBD	%	TBD	%	TBD	%	TBD	%	TBD
Gombe South Senatorial District (Note: Comprising the local government areas of Balanga, Billiri, Kaltungo, and Shongom.)	TBD	%	TBD	%	TBD	%	TBD	%	TBD	%	TBD
Totals	TBD	%	TBD	%	TBD	%	TBD	%	TBD	%	TBD

==== By federal constituency ====
The results of the election by federal constituency.

Federal constituency	Bola Tinubu APC		Atiku Abubakar PDP		Peter Obi LP		Rabiu Kwankwaso NNPP		Others		Total valid votes
Federal constituency	Votes	%	Votes	%	Votes	%	Votes	%	Votes	%	Total valid votes
Akko Federal Constituency (Note: Comprising the local government area of Akko.)	TBD	%	TBD	%	TBD	%	TBD	%	TBD	%	TBD
Balanga/Billiri Federal Constituency (Note: Comprising the local government areas of Balanga and Billiri.)	TBD	%	TBD	%	TBD	%	TBD	%	TBD	%	TBD
Dukku/Nafada Federal Constituency (Note: Comprising the local government areas of Dukku and Nafada.)	TBD	%	TBD	%	TBD	%	TBD	%	TBD	%	TBD
Gombe/Kwami/Funakaye Federal Constituency (Note: Comprising the local government areas of Gombe, Kwami, and Funakaye.)	TBD	%	TBD	%	TBD	%	TBD	%	TBD	%	TBD
Kaltungo/Shongom Federal Constituency (Note: Comprising the local government areas of Kaltungo and Shongom.)	TBD	%	TBD	%	TBD	%	TBD	%	TBD	%	TBD
Yamaltu/Deba Federal Constituency (Note: Comprising the local government area of Yamaltu/Deba.)	TBD	%	TBD	%	TBD	%	TBD	%	TBD	%	TBD
Totals	TBD	%	TBD	%	TBD	%	TBD	%	TBD	%	TBD

==== By local government area ====
The results of the election by local government area.

Local government area	Bola Tinubu APC		Atiku Abubakar PDP		Peter Obi LP		Rabiu Kwankwaso NNPP		Others		Total valid votes	Turnout (%)
Local government area	Votes	%	Votes	%	Votes	%	Votes	%	Votes	%	Total valid votes	Turnout (%)
Akko	TBD	%	TBD	%	TBD	%	TBD	%	TBD	%	TBD	%
Balanga	TBD	%	TBD	%	TBD	%	TBD	%	TBD	%	TBD	%
Billiri	TBD	%	TBD	%	TBD	%	TBD	%	TBD	%	TBD	%
Dukku	TBD	%	TBD	%	TBD	%	TBD	%	TBD	%	TBD	%
Funakaye	TBD	%	TBD	%	TBD	%	TBD	%	TBD	%	TBD	%
Gombe	TBD	%	TBD	%	TBD	%	TBD	%	TBD	%	TBD	%
Kaltungo	TBD	%	TBD	%	TBD	%	TBD	%	TBD	%	TBD	%
Kwami	TBD	%	TBD	%	TBD	%	TBD	%	TBD	%	TBD	%
Nafada	TBD	%	TBD	%	TBD	%	TBD	%	TBD	%	TBD	%
Shongom	TBD	%	TBD	%	TBD	%	TBD	%	TBD	%	TBD	%
Yamaltu/Deba	TBD	%	TBD	%	TBD	%	TBD	%	TBD	%	TBD	%
Totals	TBD	%	TBD	%	TBD	%	TBD	%	TBD	%	TBD	%

== See also ==
- 2023 Gombe State elections
- 2023 Nigerian presidential election
