= Gombe State House of Assembly =

Legislative arm of the government of Gombe State of Nigeria

- 7th Gombe State House of Assembly

Type
- Type: Unicameral
- Term limits: 4 years

History
- Founded: 1999

Leadership
- Speaker: Abubakar Muhammad Luggerewo, APC
- Deputy Speaker: Sadam Bello Sale, APC
- Majority Leader: Yerima Gaule, APC

Structure
- Seats: 24
- Political groups: Majority: APC (20); Minority: PDP (4)

Elections
- Last election: 2023
- Next election: 2027

Website
- https://gombestate.gov.ng/legislative-2/

The Gombe State House of Assembly is the legislative arm of the government of Gombe State of Nigeria. It is a unicameral legislature with 24 members elected from the 11 local government areas of the state delineated into 24 state constituencies. Local government areas with considerably larger populations are delineated into two constituencies to give equal representation. This makes the number of legislators in the Gombe State House of Assembly 24.

The fundamental functions of the Assembly are to enact new laws, amend or repeal existing laws and oversight of the executive. Members of the assembly are elected for a term of four years concurrent with federal legislators (Senate and House of Representatives). The state assembly convenes three times a week (Tuesdays, Wednesdays and Thursdays) in the assembly complex within the state capital, Gombe.

The leaders of the 6th Gombe State House of Assembly are Mr Luggerewo, Speaker (APC, Akko Central constituency), Sadam Bello Sale, Deputy Speaker, (APC, Funakaye North Constituency), Yerima Gaule, Majority Leader The All Progressives Congress (APC) is the majority party with 20 seats while People's Democratic Party (PDP) constitutes the minority position having only 4 seats.

Gombe State House Of Assembly Constituencies List:

1. Akko Central (Kumo)
2. Akko North
3. Akko West
4. Balanga North
5. Balanga South
6. Billiri East
7. Billiri West
8. Dukku North
9. Dukku South
10. Deba
11. Funakaye North
12. Funakaye South
13. Gombe North
14. Gombe South
15. Kaltungo East
16. Kaltungo West
17. Kwami East
18. Kwami West
19. Nafada North
20. Nafada South
21. Pero/Chonge
22. Shongom
23. Yamaltu East
24. Yamaltu West

== List of current members ==
Member	Roles	LGA	Constituency	Roles
Abdullahi Abubakar	APC"	Akko	Akko West	Nill
Mohammed A. Musa	APC	Akko	Akko North	Nill
Muhammad Abubakar Luggerewo	APC	Akko	Akko Central	Speaker
Buba Musa	APC	Balanga	Balanga North	Chief Whip
Maigemi Lamido Isaac	APC	Balanga	Balanga South	Nill
Daniel Yakubu	PDP	Billiri	Billiri East	Nill
Malon Nimrod Yari	PDP	Billiri	Billiri West	Nill
Abdulkarim Nasiru	APC	Dukku	Dukku North	Nill
Umar Adamu A	APC	Dukku	Dukku South	Nill
Suleiman Mohammed Kabir	APC	Yamaltu/Deba	Deba, Gombe	Nill
Adamu Sale Pata	APC	Yamaltu/Deba	Yamaltu East	Nill
Manaja Musa Zambuk	APC	Yamaltu/Deba	Yamaltu West	Nill
Sadam Bello Sale	APC	Funakaye	Funakaye North	Deputy Speaker
Abubakar Dayi Muhammed	APC	Funakaye	Funakaye South	Nill
Manu Aliyu Baba	APC	Gombe	Gombe North	Nill
Mustapha Usman Hassan	APC	Gombe	Gombe South	Road and Transport
Ladan Yerima Gaule	APC	Kaltungo	Kaltungo East	Nill
Gabriel Galadima Fushison	PDP	Kaltungo	Kaltungo West	Nill
Haruna Shuaibu Adamu	APC	Kwami	Kwami East	Nill
Siddi Buba	APC	Kwami	Kwami West	Nill
Muhammed Tahir Dan.Galadima	APC	Nafada	Nafada North	Nill
Adamu A. Musa	APC	Nafada	Nafada South	Nill
Golkos Gaius Gaji	APC	Shongom	Pero/Chonge	Nill
Ayala Zubairu Pilate	PDP	Shongom	Shongom	Nill
