= Gombe State Security, Traffic and Environmental Commission =

Nigerian government commission

The Gombe State Security, Traffic and Environmental Commission (GOSTEC) is a government commission in Gombe State, Nigeria, tasked with supporting the state's security efforts, managing traffic operations, and overseeing environmental protection initiatives.

== History ==
The Commission was formally established by the Gombe State Security, Traffic and Environmental Commission Law, 2025, which was enacted by the Gombe State House of Assembly on 25 February 2025 and assented by Governor Muhammad Inuwa Yahaya in May 2025, repealing the earlier Gombe State Agency for Social Services Law, 2018. GOSTEC is empowered to complement conventional security agencies, maintain public order, enforce traffic regulations, and safeguard environmental integrity across the state.

Under this program, 500 youths were trained and deployed across the state's 11 local government areas to support statutory agencies and foster community-based responses to public safety and environmental challenges.
