= 2019 Gombe State gubernatorial election =

2019 gubernatorial election in Gombe State, Nigeria

- 9 March 2019
	APC	PDP
Nominee	Muhammad Inuwa Yahaya	Usman Bayero Nafada
Party	APC	PDP
Running mate	Manasseh Daniel Jatau	Charles Yau Iliyas
Popular vote	364,179	222,868
Percentage	26.12%	15.98%
Governor before election
Ibrahim Hassan Dankwambo
PDP
Elected Governor
Muhammad Inuwa Yahaya
APC

The 2019 Gombe State gubernatorial election occurred in Nigeria on 9 March 2019, the APC nominee Muhammad Inuwa Yahaya won the election, defeating Usman Bayero Nafada of the PDP. Muhammad Inuwa Yahaya emerged APC gubernatorial candidate after scoring 859 votes and defeating his closest rival, Mohammed Jibrin Barde who received 463 votes. He picked Manasseh Daniel Jatau as his running mate.

== Electoral system ==
The Governor of Gombe State was elected using the plurality voting system.

== Primary election ==
=== APC primary ===
The APC primary election was held on September 28, 2018. Muhammad Inuwa Yahaya won the primary election polling 859 votes against 8 other candidates. His closest rival was Mohammed Jibrin Barde, who came second with 463 votes, while Farouk Bamusa came third with 139 votes.

=== Candidates ===
- Party nominee: Muhammad Inuwa Yahaya
- Running mate: Manasseh Daniel Jatau:
- Mohammed Jibrin Barde
- Farouk Bamusa
- Idris Umar: a former minister of transport
- Umar Kwairanga
- Abubakar Habu Muazu
- Dasuki Jalo Waziri
- Ahmed Khamisu Mailantarki
- Aliyu Haidar Abubakar

=== PDP primary ===
The PDP primary election was held on September 30, 2018. Usman Bayero Nafada won the primary election polling 1,104 votes against 12 other candidates. His closest rival was Jamilu Gwamna, a governorship aspirant on the platform of the Peoples Democratic Party (PDP) who came second with 147 votes.

=== Candidates ===
- Party nominee: Usman Bayero Nafada, a former Deputy Speaker of the House of Representatives
- Running mate: Charles Yau Iliyas
- Jamilu Gwamna

== Results ==
A total number of 32 candidates registered with the Independent National Electoral Commission to contest in the election. The total number of registered voters in the state was 1,394,386, while 627,457 voters were accredited. Total number of votes cast was 623,230, while number of valid votes was 608,846. Rejected votes were 14,384.

Candidate	Party	Votes	%
Muhammad Inuwa Yahaya	All Progressives Congress	364,179	26.12
Usman Bayero Nafada	People's Democratic Party	222,868	15.98
Other candidates		807,339	57.90
Total		1,394,386	100.00
Valid votes		1,394,386	98.98
Invalid/blank votes		14,384	1.02
Total votes		1,408,770	100.00
Registered voters/turnout		1,394,386	101.03
Source: Pulse.ng

=== By local government area ===
Here are the results of the election by local government area for the two major parties. The total valid votes of 608,846 represents the 32 political parties that participated in the election. Blue represents LGAs won by Muhammad Inuwa Yahaya. Green represents LGAs won by Usman Bayero Nafada.

LGA	Muhammad Inuwa Yahaya APC		Usman Bayero Nafada PDP		Total votes
LGA	#	%	#	%	#
Gombe	68,384		21,673		
Shongom	13,463		12,993		
Yamaltu/Deba	51,521		25,852		
Akko	58,479		30,832		
Balanga	30,926		18,192		
Dukku	27,302		16,807		
Kwami	30,539		18,240		
Billiri	18,612		18,063		
Funakaye	29,191		22,259		
Kaltungo	26,744		22,259		
Nafada	9,018		17,937		
Totals	364,179		222,868		608,846
