= Salamatu =

Salamatu may refer to:

== People ==
=== First name ===
- Salamatu Fada, Nigerian-British conservation scientist, educator, and specialist
- Salamatu Hussaini Suleiman, Nigerian lawyer
- Salamatu Kamara, Sierra Leonean educator, politician, and women right's activist
- Salamatu Koroma, Sierra Leonean judge

=== Middle name ===
- Elizabeth Salamatu Forgor, Ghanaian diplomat
