= Jekadefari =

Area in Gombe State, Nigeria

- Country: Nigeria
- State: Gombe State
- Local government area: Gombe Local Government Area

Jekadefari is an area in Gombe State, Nigeria. The area is historically significant as it was where white men settled after they conquered the emir of Gombe in 1903.

== Etymology ==
The name is derived from two Hausa words: "jeka," meaning "follow," and "defari," meaning "white." Thus, Jekadefari translates to "follow the white men."

== History ==
Due to the area's age, all of the structures are made of clay and lack proper town planning. There would have been no access to the residences had Alh. Ibrahim Hassan Dankwambo, the previous governor, not built accessible routes to the neighbourhood.

Additionally, Alhaji Muhammad Inuwa Yahaya's current administration has maintained these routes to ensure appropriate access to the residences. It is also the location of the current Governor's family home.

Jekadefari is notable for housing various state institutions, such as the Gombe State School of Nursing and Midwifery, State Specialist Hospital, and Government Science Secondary School.

== Polling units ==
Jekadafari is a ward in the Gombe Local Government Area of Gombe State, Nigeria.

Polling units in Jekadafari:

- Goni Ali, Kofar Goni Ali
- Sarkin Fata, Kofar Sarkin Fata
- Hassan Kwadon, Kofar H. Kwadon
- Ung. Doma, Doma Area Court
- Kani, Kofar Kani
- Umaru Adamu, Kofar U. Adamu
- Saidu Mangu, Kofar S. Mangu
- Buzu, Kofar Buzu
- Magaji Rumbudi, Kofar Magaji R.
- Yahaya Umaru, Kofar Y. Umaru
- Usman Asibity, Kofar U. Asibity
- Mele Mai Gishiri, K. M. Mai Gishiri
- Ibrahim Nayaya, K. Ibrahim Nayaya
- Malma Mamman, K. M. Mamman
- Malam Mamman, K. M. Mamman 2
- Modibo Tukur, K. M. Tukur
- Alh. Sarki, Kofar Alh. Sarki
- Checheniya, K. Bappayo Jamjam
- Nayaya, Min. Of Education
- Namadi, Kofar Namadi
- Tsamiya, Kofar J. Tsamiya
- Buhari Estate, Buhari Estate
- Immigration Office, Immigration Office
- Immigration Quarters, Immigration Quarters
- Wanzam, K. Adamu Wanzam
- Upper Benue, K. Upper Benue
- Bappah Tirebo, K/bappah Tirebo
- Mai Saka, Kofar Mai Saka
- J. I. Orji, J. I. Orji Quarters.

== Notable structures ==
- Primary Health Care Jekadafari
- Old Burial Ground, Abacha Road, Jekadafari
- Gombe State Specialist Hospital
- Gombe Old Market (Tsohuwar Kasuwa)
- Gombe State School of Nursing and Midwifery
