= Rambi Ibrahim Ayala =

Nigerian politician

Member of the Gombe State House of Assembly
- Incumbent
- Assumed office 2019
- Constituency: Billiri East

Personal details
- Party: New Nigeria People's Party (since 2023)
- Other political affiliations: People's Democratic Party
- Occupation: Politician

Rambi Ibrahim Ayala is a Nigerian politician. He currently serves as the State Representative representing Billiri East constituency at the Gombe State House of Assembly.

== Political career ==
Rambi Ibrahim Ayala is a Nigerian politician who represents the Billiri East Constituency in the Gombe State House of Assembly. He was elected to the Assembly in the 2019 general election. In 2023, he became the acting chairman of the New Nigeria People's Party (NNPP) in Gombe State following the resignation of the party's acting chairman.
