= Balanga =

Balanga may refer to:

- Balanga, Nigeria, a Local Government Area of Gombe State
- Balanga, Bataan, a city in the Philippines
- Balanga, another name for tapayan, large wide-mouthed earthenware or stoneware jars in Southeast Asia
