= Gombe State University of Science and Technology, Kumo =

Technological University in Nigeria

Gombe State University of science and Technology
- Type: Public
- Established: 2017
- Affiliations: NUC
- Vice-Chancellor: Prof. Abdullahi Mahdi
- Location: Kumo, Nigeria

Gombe State University of Science and Technology, Kumo is a public university that was established in 2017. It is located in Kumo, Gombe State, Nigeria.

The University was approved by the National Universities Commission (NUC) as the 2nd State University in Gombe State, making it the 46th State University, 86th Public University and 154th University in Nigeria.

Gombe State Government under the leadership of Governor Muhammadu Inuwa Yahaya signed a historic MoU with Lincoln University College of Malaysia to activate and upgrade the State's University of Science and Technology, Kumo as a centre of academic excellence in March 2022.

Founded in 2017, Gombe State University of Science and Technology is a public higher education institution located in Kumo, Gombe. Officially accredited and recognized by the National Universities Commission (NUC), Nigeria, Gombe State University of Science and Technology (GSUST) is a coeducational higher education institution. Gombe State University of Science and Technology (GSUST) offers courses and programs leading to officially recognized higher education degrees in several areas of study.

List of courses offered in Gombe State University of Science and Technology, Kumo.

1. Accountancy/Accounting
2. Business Management
3. Public Administration
4. Christian Religious Studies
5. English Language
6. History
7. Islamic Studies
8. Education and Biology
9. Education and Chemistry
10. Education and Christian Religious Studies
11. Education and English Language
12. Education and Geography
13. Education and Islamic Studies
14. Education and Mathematics
15. Education and Physics
16. Education and History
17. Biochemistry
18. Biology
19. Chemistry
20. Botany
21. Computer Science
22. Geology
23. Microbiology
24. Mathematics
25. Physics
26. Statistics
27. Zoology
28. Economics
29. Geography
30. Sociology
31. Political Science
