= Abdullahi Muhammad Kwadon =

Nigerian politician and teacher

Speaker of the Gombe State House of Assembly
- Incumbent
- Assumed office 1999

Personal details
- Born: 1940s Kwadon, Yamaltu Deba Local Government Area, Gombe State, Nigeria
- Died: 2017
- Occupation: Politician, teacher, administrator

Abdullahi Muhammad Kwadon was a Nigerian politician and teacher born in the 1940s in Kwadon, Yamaltu Deba Local Government Area, Gombe State, Nigeria. He was the first Speaker of the Gombe State House of Assembly in 1999 and also served as an administrator with the Local Government Service Commission. Abdullahi Muhammad Kwadon died at the age of 75. He is survived by four wives, 30 children, and many grandchildren.
