= Abubakar Muhammad Luggerewo =

Muhammad Abubakar Luggerewo Honorable

Speaker of Gombe State House of Assembly
- Incumbent
- Assumed office 25 November 2020
- Preceded by: Hon. Sadiq Kurba

Personal details
- Born: 11 March 1984 (age 42) Maiduguri, Northern Region, British Nigeria
- Party: All Progressive Congress
- Education: University of Maiduguri
- Occupation: politician

Muhammad Abubakar Luggerewo (born 11 March 1984) is a Nigerian politician who serves as the Speaker of the Gombe State House of Assembly and a Member representing Akko Central (Kumo).

== Early life and education ==
He was born on 11 March 1984. He attended Ngarannam Primary School, Maiduguri from 1989 to 1994 and Brigadier Maimalari Day Secondary School from 1994 to 2000 before proceeding to Ramat Polytechnic Maiduguri in 2002 where he obtained a Diploma in General Agriculture in 2004. Luggerewo gained admission into University of Maiduguri in 2008 where he graduated with a Bachelor of Agric.(Hons.) Agric Economics in 2014 and is currently pursuing his M.Sc. Degree in Agricultural Economics at the University.

== Career ==
He worked as a banker with Guarantee Trust Bank PLC from June 2005 to June 2006 and Eco Bank Nigeria Limited from 2007 to 2018 before being elected member representing Akko Central in the State House of Assembly on the platform of APC in 2019.

== 6th Assembly ==
Luggerewo was Speaker of the Sixth Assembly after the impeachment of Hon. Sadiq Kurba on 24 November 2020.
