= Aliyu Modibbo Umar =

Nigerian politician

Minister of the Federal Capital Territory
- In office July 2007 – October 2008
- Preceded by: Nasir Ahmad el-Rufai
- Succeeded by: Adamu Aliero

Minister of Commerce
- In office July 2006 – July 2007
- Preceded by: Idris Waziri
- Succeeded by: Charles Ugwuh

Minister of State for Power and Steel
- In office December 2002 – May 2003

Personal details
- Born: 15 November 1958 (age 67) Kumo, Gombe State, Nigeria
- Education: California State University (BA); University of California (MA); University of California (PhD)

Aliyu Modibbo Umar (born 15 November 1958) is a Nigerian technocrat who currently serves as the Special Adviser on General Duties to the Vice President of Nigeria, Kashim Shettima. He previously served as the federal Minister of State for Power and Steel from December 2002 to May 2003, Minister of Commerce from July 2006 to July 2007, then Minister for the FCT (Federal Capital Territory, Abuja), a post he held until October 2008.

== Background ==
Aliyu Modibbo Umar was born of Kumo origin in Gombe State on 15 November 1958. He completed a BA (journalism) at California State University, Long Beach; and an MA (African Studies) and PhD (Comparative Education) from the UCLA.

His first job was in 1979 as a reporter for the Nigerian Television Authority. Between 1986 and 1992, he worked in the United States, returning to Nigeria in 1993 to take up a position as a lecturer at the University of Abuja. He then moved into civilian administration, working in the office of the Chief of Staff to the President.

== Obasanjo presidency ==
Under President Olusegun Obasanjo, Aliyu Modibbo was appointed Minister of State for Power and Steel from January to May 2003.

In March 2003, he stated that the Federal government had spent N2.2 billion on rural electrification projects in Gombe State.

He blamed saboteurs for the frequent power outages during this period.

After a Federal Executive Council (FEC) meeting in March 2003, Modibbo Umar stated it had been decided to ban imports of toothpicks of any kind, bottled water, biscuits of all types, spaghetti and noodles.

He was appointed Chairman of Peugeot Automobile Nigeria Ltd. (PAN) in May 2003, as well as holding the post of Senior Special Assistant to the President on Research and Liaison. In March 2004 he detailed plans to re-launch manufacture of Peugeot cars in Nigeria, selling them at affordable prices. As chairman of PAN, he resolved the industrial crises between management and Staff of the company which grounded operation in the factory for several years and within 90 days, he turned the fortunes of PAN around. During his tenure as chairman, Dr. Modibbo pioneered the first export of made in Nigeria Peugeot cars to other African countries. It was Dr. Modibbo that insisted that Peugeot 307 cars be used for Abuja Taxi scheme introduced by the then Minister of FCT Mallam Nasir El Rufai. Dr. Modibbo also facilitated the adoption of Peugeot 307 cars as taxis in Rivers state under the administration of Dr. Peter Odili as governor of Rivers state. He championed the introduction of Consumer Car Finance Scheme for Public servants in which 15,000 military, paramilitary and police personnel benefitted from.

In September 2004, he stated that Peugeot Automobile Nigeria had started to export to Senegal, Côte d'Ivoire and Cameroon, with an initial delivery of 120 cars.

In June 2006 he was nominated as Minister of Commerce to replace Idris Waziri, and was confirmed in July 2006 while remaining chairman of the board of directors of PAN.

As Minister of Commerce, he was responsible for the establishment of the Nigerian-Russian Business Council to promote co-operation, collaboration and improvement of trade relationship between the two countries. He also introduced the trailblazing Commerce 44 project which was aimed at promoting 11 agricultural products, 11 manufactured products, 11 solid mineral products to 11 Global Markets. In March 2007, speaking at the official commissioning of the Human Capital Development Centre in Ikoyi, Lagos, Aliyu Modibbo Umar said that Nigeria should take advantage of African Growth and Opportunity Act which was signed into law on 18 May 2000, by US President Bill Clinton.

Later that month, as spokesman for the African, Caribbean and Pacific Group of States Ministers at the EU-ACP ministerial meeting in Bonn, Aliyu Modibbo stated that the Economic Partnership Agreements (EPA) should be implemented carefully to avoid negative impact, especially on countries in the Economic Community of West African States (ECOWAS) region.

== Yar'Adua presidency ==
In July 2007, two months after he had been elected, President Umaru Yar'Adua appointed Aliyu Modibbo Umar Minister of Federal Capital Territory. In the early period of his ministry he was praised for introducing a technocratic team to address the problems of the region.

He set up a committee to select the "FCT Department of the year" to encourage innovation and healthy competition among the FCT departments. He initiated visionary projects in the city one of which was the Abuja Central District Development also called the Abuja Boulevard. The Boulevard was a 6.5 kilometre project conceived to provide character, class and grandeur finesse to Abuja City as one of the promising emerging modern cities of the world. Cutting across the Central Business Districts of the city, the boulevard was to provide the city with state-of-the-art facilities for commerce, entertainment, high street shopping and leisure. Dr. Modibbo also proposed Abuja City University which would offer opportunity to workers in Abuja City to further their education without going out of their working environment. The Committee he inaugurated for this purpose was chaired by Prof. Pat Utomi.

He insisted on Rule of Law by restoring over 3,000 plots of land that was seized from the rightful owners without recourse to due process or rule of law. Some of these plots of land belonged to even the diplomatic community. In addition, he put in place stringent security measure in the FCT that made the city the safest in the Nigeria during his tenure. To achieve this, he flagged off Abuja Crime Control Squad (ACCOS)The Initiative gave birth to the institution of G-6 which was a security strategy that ringed the neighbouring states of Kaduna, Kogi, Nasarrawa and Benue states in a joint security arrangement. this strategy dropped crime rate in the city by over 50% between July and June in 2007/2008 compared to the period in review in 2006/2007. Other laudable policies introduced by Dr Modibbo as FCT Minister include free antenatal care for pregnant women in FCT. He declared 'We in the FCT Administration seek to achieve at the end of every pregnancy, a healthy mother and a healthy baby'. Other projects and policies initiated by him include Abuja Downtown Mall which was to provide modern lifestyle centre made up of high street shopping, entertainment, residential, hospitality and world class office spaces. Also, he made available a 30,000 hectares of land for the development of agricultural chain and also introduced the first ever Maitama Farmers market. others are; Abuja Film Village, and creation of 5 new Parks in the city

He stated his intention to boost agriculture output in the FCT "not only for ... consumption within the Territory but for export to other states of the federation and beyond".

In March 2008 he gave his support for establishment of a Cyprian Ekwensi Council for Arts and Culture.

In May 2008 he announced that the FCT Administration had concluded plans to establish a City University in Abuja, offering courses in management sciences to help working-class people gain skills.

In June 2008 he was criticised for resuming forced evictions of informal settlements in the FCT.

He defended his action on the grounds that the informal settlements had to be demolished because their existence violated the Abuja Master Plan.

He said of the shanty towns around Abuja, most of which lack electricity or piped water, "The moment we relent and allow shanty towns they will keep growing and growing to the point where we can't do anything about them so we thought it would be better to nip it in the bud."
