= Idris Waziri =

Nigerian politician

Idris Waziri CON

Minister of Commerce
- In office July 2003 – June 2007
- Preceded by: Precious Ngelale
- Succeeded by: Aliyu Modibbo Umar

Personal details
- Born: 12 October 1952 (age 73) Taraba State
- Party: People's Democratic Party (PDP)

Amb'Idris Waziri (b 1952) is a Nigerian politician and business executive.

== Biography ==
Waziri gained a degree at Ahmadu Bello University, Zaria. He then joined the government as an administrative officer. He became a Permanent Secretary and then Commissioner of Finance, Commerce and Industry, and retired in 1993. to work in the private sector.

He was a founding member of the People's Democratic Party (PDP) In 1999, President Olusegun Obasanjo appointed him Nigerian Ambassador to Pakistan.

He was appointed as Minister of Commerce in July 2003 and resigned in June 2006 to contest the 2007 gubernatorial elections of Taraba state.

Waziri ran unsuccessfully for the Governor of Taraba state in 2007, in 2013 he was chosen by Dan-Baba Suntai then Governor of Taraba state to run for PDP National Chairman.

In 2021, he was appointed by the Governor of Taraba state Arc Darius Dickson Ishaku as the chairman of the governing council, Taraba state university.

During his tenure as commerce minister, Waziri was known for his enthusiasm for exporting cassava.
