= Manasseh Daniel Jatau =

Nigerian politician (born 1955)

His Excellency Manassah Daniel Jatau

Deputy Governor of Gombe State
- Incumbent
- Assumed office 29 May 2019
- Governor: Muhammad Inuwa Yahaya
- Preceded by: Charles Yau Illiya

Personal details
- Born: 29 December 1955 (age 70) Balanga, Northern Region, British Nigeria (now in Gombe State, Nigeria)
- Party: All Progressive Congress
- Occupation: politician

Manassah Daniel Jatau (born 29 December 1955) is a Nigerian politician who has served as the deputy governor of Gombe state since 2019. He was elected deputy governor alongside Governor Muhammad Inuwa Yahaya during the 2019 election.

== See also ==
- Gombe State
