= Akko Emirate =

Emirate in Northern Nigeria

Akko Emirate is among the three emirates in Akko LGA, a long time emirate located in Kumo, Gombe State, The emir of the Kingdom is traditionally called "Lamido" from Fula, which means "Leader". The origin of the emirate is Gona, then relocated to Kumo later. The emirate is occupied by Fulani people|

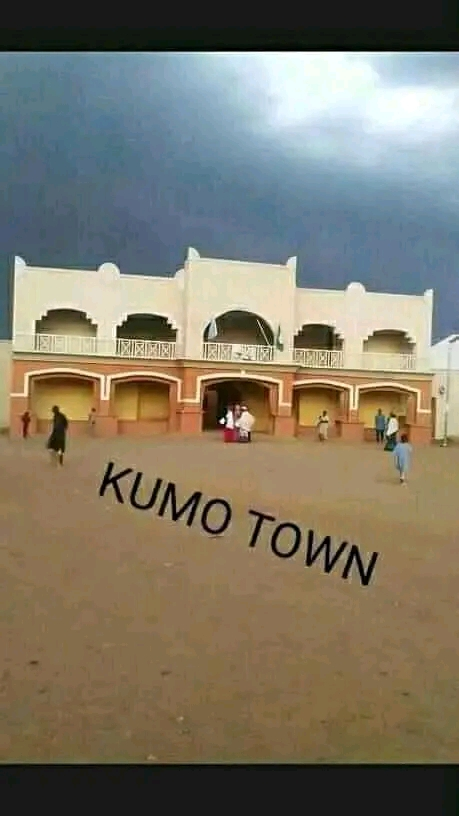
Akko Emir's Palace

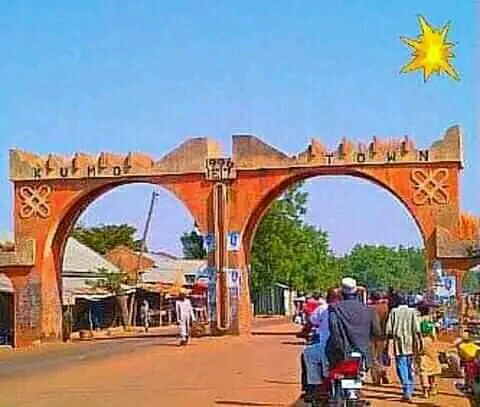
Kofar Tashan Magarya Kumo

== Emir (Lamido Akko) ==
The current Lamido Akko is Umar Muhammad Atiku.

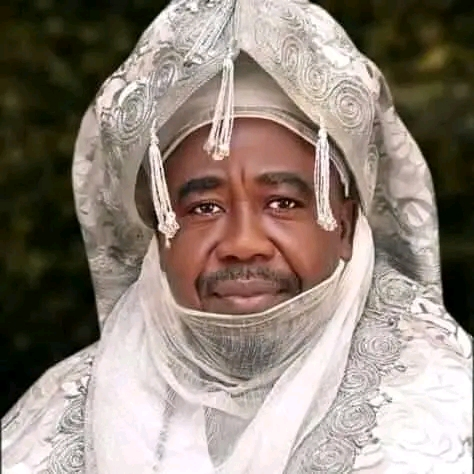
Lamido Akko
