= Gombe State Specialist Hospital =

Hospital in Gombe State, Nigeria

Gombe State Specialist Hospital is one of the most functioning hospitals after Federal Teaching Hospital Gombe which was renovated and equipped by the current government of Alhaji Muhammad inuwa yahaya and some non-governmental organization bodies for more effective service.

== Overview ==
This was renovated to prepare the system to be able to provide the needed services to the people, the government renovated the specialist hospital and provided with basic equipment for the system to move smoothly, 24-hour light, and a borehole for the betterment of the state and neighboring communities.
