= Gombe State School of Nursing and Midwifery =

Educational institution in Nigeria

Coordinates: 10.287°N 11.1565°E

- Type: Public
- Established: 2004
- Location: Gombe Gombe State Nigeria
- Campus: Urban
- Website: https://www.cnsgombe.org/

Gombe State School of Nursing and Midwifery was established under Gombe State University, Nigeria, in 2004 under the government of Governor Danjuma Goje, as a state-managed institution for the teaching of nursing and midwifery.

== History ==
The administration of Muhammad Inuwa Yahaya stated that the institution was established in line with the tripartite mission of institutions of higher education which involves teaching, research and service, as well as production of knowledge through research, building of an exemplary character in the individual student through learning and engaging the society in the exchange of ideas through service.

As governor, Muhammadu Inuwa Yahaya had announced the decision of relocating the state College of Nursing And Midwifery to Akko. A group known as Gombe North Awareness And Reform Initiative (GONARI) has appealed to the State Government to reverse the decision relocating the college. In 2021, there were plans by the Governor of Gombe State, Governor Inuwa Yahaya to convert the abandoned building of the school to a campus of the Gombe State University.

== Conversion to state school of nursing campus ==
Gombe state governor converted the abandoned college of nursing to full state school of nursing campus.

== Colleges in the school ==
- Midwifery school
- Nursing school

=== Courses in midwifery ===
- Basic Midwifery

=== Courses in nursing ===
- Higher National Diploma (HND) in Nursing
- Post Basic Nursing

== Admission requirements ==
applicants Seeking admission into Gombe state school of nursing must possess a minimum of five credits in their WAEC/NECO/GCE/NABTEB, achieved in no more than two sittings, including Chemistry, Physics, Mathematics, English, and Biology. And the, candidates must fall within the age bracket of 16 to 35 years old.

== See also ==
- List of universities in Nigeria
- https://www.cnsgombe.org/
