= Salamatu Fada =

Nigerian-British scientist and educator (born 1974)

Cllr. Dr. Salamatu Jidda-Fada
- Born: November 1, 1974 (age 51); Balanga, Nigeria
- Education: University of Jos (BSc, MSc); Bangor University (PhD)
- Occupation: Conservation scientist
- Political party: Independent
- Website: https://salamatufada.com/

Salamatu Jidda Fada (born November 1, 1974) is a Nigerian-British conservation scientist, international development specialist, and educator. Her research focuses on the effects of climate change and vegetation change in West and East Africa. She has worked with several conservation organisations in Nigeria on biodiversity and community-based environmental initiatives.

== Early life and education ==
Fada was born in the Balanga Local Government Area of Gombe State, Nigeria, and later moved to Bangor, Wales. She obtained a Bachelor of Science in Geography (1997) and a Master of Science in Environmental and Resources Planning (2005) from the University of Jos. Following her master's degree, she was appointed as senior lecturer at the same institution.

In 2011, Fada received a PhD in Conservation Biology from Bangor University. For the next two years, she worked there as a research fellow at the Centre for Evidence-Based Conservation.

In 2016, Fada completed her postdoctoral research project titled "GyaraYankari."

== Career ==
=== United Kingdom ===
Fada has held several academic and advisory positions in both the United Kingdom and Nigeria. She served as a member of Bangor City Council in Wales and as Vice Chair of Adult Learning Wales, where she leads the Learner Experience Committee. She is a member of the Advisory Committee for Wales at the Royal Society for the Protection of Birds and an ambassador for Climate Cymru, a Welsh environmental coalition.

=== Nigeria ===
In Nigeria, Fada is part of the Expert Assessment Group for the International Union for Conservation of Nature Green List of Protected and Conserved Areas. She convened the Coalition of Biodiversity Conservationists in Nigeria.

=== Organisations and Initiatives ===
Fada founded Tallafi UK, an organisation focused on educational and sustainable development initiatives between the United Kingdom and Africa. She also co-founded the North Wales Africa Society, which facilitates cultural exchange between communities in North Wales and African countries.

She is a member of the CEEDER Review College within the Collaboration for Environmental Evidence.

== Affiliations ==
- JAVS Environmental Care Ltd. (Founder)
- University of Jos (Senior Lecturer)
- Bangor City Council (Councillor)
- Tallafi UK & Tallafi Education Initiative (Founder)
- Climate Cymru (Ambassador & Steering Committee Member)
- Collaboration for Environmental Evidence (CEEDER) (Review College Member)
- Centre for Sustainability Research and Practice (CSRaP) (Co-Founder)
- Addysg Oedolion, Cymru (Vice-Chair)
- Missions Supporters League (UK/EU Regional Coordinator)
- North Wales African Society (Co-Founder, Advisor)
- Coalition for Biodiversity Conservationists of Nigeria (Convener)
- Welsh Government, Climate Change & Rural Affairs (CCRA) (Eryri National Park Authority Member)
- Royal Society for the Protection of Birds (RSPB), Cymru, UK (Advisory Committee Member)
- Expert Assessment Group, IUCN Green List (Appointed Member)
- African Development Bank Group (Consultant)
- The Shift Initiative (Board Member)
- Bangor University (Student Ambassador to Nigeria and Ghana)
- UK/EU Diaspora Affairs, Gombe State (Regional Coordinator)
- GyaraYankari (Founder)
- Triumphant Youth Foundation (Board Member)
- Association of Local Government of Nigeria (ALGON) (Consultant on Development & Partnerships)

== Awards ==
- Outstanding Black Women Award, Race Council Cymru Black History Awards (2015)
- Outstanding Leadership Award, Gwynedd Council Black History Awards (2021)
- Outstanding Leadership Award, Conwy Council Black History Awards (2022)
- North Wales Police and Crime Commissioner Award (2022)
- Honorary Doctor of Science (D.Sc.), Bangor University (2023)
- Named among "100 Change Makers in Wales" by WalesOnline (2023)
- Ethnic Minority Welsh Women Achievement Award (EMWWAA) for Management and Leadership (Finalist) (2023)
- Sheroes Among Us Award, North Wales, NWAS Recognition Awards (2023)
- Women Who Lead Award, North Wales, NWAS Recognition Awards (2023)
- Outstanding Contribution to Public Service Award, North Wales, NWAS Recognition Awards (2023)
- Ad-hoc Committee Member, the Institution of Environmental Practitioners of Nigeria (2024)
