= Deba, Gombe State =

Deba
- town
- Location within Nigeria
- Coordinates: 10°13′N 11°23′E
- Country: Nigeria
- State: Gombe

Deba, sometimes known as Deba Habe, is a town in Gombe State in northern Nigeria. It is headquarter of the Yamaltu/Deba local government area, Gombe State. As of 1995, it had an estimated population of 135,400.

== Approval of Medical center ==
The Senate approved the creation of federal Medical center Deba gombe state Nigeria.
