= Kumo, Nigeria =

Kumo Kumo
- City
- Kumo
- Interactive map of Kumo
- Coordinates (Gombe): 10.0496°N 11.1997°E

Government
  - Lamiɗo: HRH Dr. Umar Muhammad Atiku
- Elevation: 0 m (0 ft)
- Time zone: UTC+1 (WAT)
- Postal code: 771102

Kumo is a town in northeastern Nigeria and the administrative headquarters of Akko Local Government Area (LGA) in Gombe State. It lies approximately 40 kilometres (25 miles) southeast of Gombe, the state capital, along the Gombe–Yola road corridor. Kumo serves as both the largest urban settlement in Akko LGA and the seat of the Akko Emirate Council, a First-Class Emirate in Gombe State.

With a population estimated at over 150,000 people (2022 projection), Kumo is one of the most populous towns in Gombe State. The town is divided into four political wards—Kumo East, Kumo West, Kumo Centre, and Lambi (Kumo North)—which collectively make it the most populous bloc in Akko LGA.

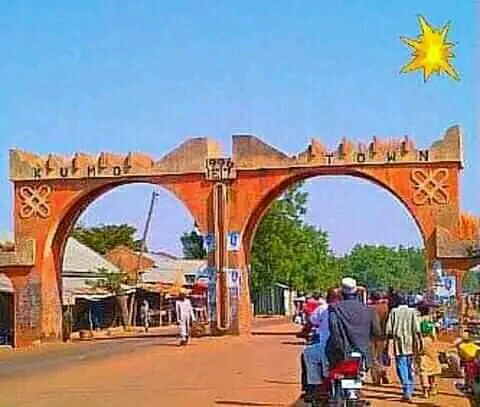
Kofar Tashan Magarya Kumo

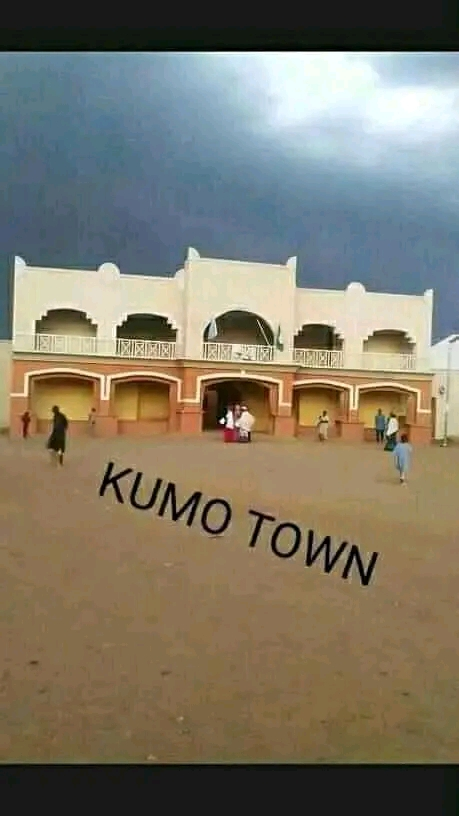
Akko Emir's Palace

== Notable people ==
- Usman Bello Kumo, is the current chairman of the House of Representatives Committee on Police Affairs. He also held the same position in the Seventh Assembly.
- Aliyu Modibbo Umar, (Former FCT Minister)
- Saidu Kumo, (politician)

== Infrastructure ==
As a growing city, kumo has been slowly expanding with the establishment of various learning institutions and road networks that place the town at an advantageous end. On 26 August 2022, a 66 km Gombe-Kumo-Billiri-Kaltungo highway was inaugurated by Former President Muhammadu Buhari. The sixty-six kilometer road links three States to Gombe, Taraba and Adamawa. While describing the project, the President regarded the highway to be one of the strategic projects aimed at improving the State's road infrastructure, supporting the ease of doing businesses, creating jobs and entrenching a prosperous economic environment, in line with the administration's commitment to eradicate poverty among the citizens of the areas.

FEDERAL MEDICAL CENTER KUMO

Federal Medical Centre (FMC), Kumo is a federal healthcare facility located in Kumo, Akko Local Government Area, Gombe State, Nigeria. It serves as an important healthcare institution for residents of Kumo and surrounding communities.

== Brief history of Federal Medical Center Kumo ==
According to the Nigerian Federal Government, the conversion of General Hospital Kumo into a Federal Medical Centre was approved in March 2025. The initiative followed a request by the Gombe State Government to expand access to advanced healthcare in the region. A Memorandum of Understanding between the federal and state governments was reported on 4 September 2025.

== Expected role and services ==
As a federal tertiary healthcare facility, FMC Kumo is intended to strengthen:

- Specialist medical consultations and treatment.
- Maternal, newborn and emergency healthcare.
- Diagnostic and laboratory services.
- Training of healthcare professionals.
- Medical research and improved access to advanced treatment.

== Climate ==
The rainy season in Kumo is oppressive and cloudy, the dry season is partly cloudy, and it's hot all year round. The average annual temperature ranges between 14 °C (58 °F) and 38 °C (100 °F), rarely falling below 12 °C (53 °F) or rising over 41 °C (105 °F).

Kumo, situated at an altitude of 0 metres (0 feet) above sea level, experiences a Tropical wet and dry or savanna climate, classified as Aw. The average annual temperature in this district is 31.08 °C (87.94 °F), surpassing Nigeria's average by 1.62%. Kumo typically receives approximately 68.03 millimetres (2.68 inches) of rainfall spread across 97.97 rainy days per year, accounting for 26.84% of the total time.

12 February through 23 April, which is 2.3 months, there is a hot season with daily high temperatures that typically exceed 35 degrees Celsius or 96 degrees Fahrenheit. April has an average high temperature of 36 °C (97 °F) and low temperature of 23 °C (74 °F), making it the hottest month of the year in Kumo.

The average daily high temperature is below 30 °C (86 °F) during the 3.3-month cool season, which runs from July 4 to October 13. December, with an average low of 14 °C (58 °F) and high of 32 °C (90 °F), is the coldest month of the year in Kumo.

=== Cloud cover ===
The average proportion of sky covered by clouds in Kumo varies significantly seasonally throughout the year. Beginning about 5 November and lasting for 4.0 months, the clearest part of the year in Kumo ends around 5 March. In Kumo, January is the clearest month of the year, with the sky remaining clear, mostly clear, or partly overcast 55% of the time. Beginning at 5 March and lasting for 8.0 months, the cloudier period of the year ends around 5 November. May is the cloudiest month of the year in Kumo, with the sky being overcast or mostly overcast 78% of the time on average.

== See also ==
- Akko Emirate
- Usman Bello Kumo
- Aliyu Modibbo Umar
- Akko
- Gombe State University of Science and Technology, Kumo
- Abubakar Muhammad Luggerewo
