= Nill =

Nill may refer to:

- Blake Nill (born 1962), former Canadian football defensive lineman
- Jim Nill (born 1958), Canadian former ice hockey player
- Maik Nill (born 1963), German weightlifter
- Rabbit Nill (1881–1962), Major League Baseball second baseman
- Jessica Schmidt (born 1979 as Nill), German chess grandmaster
