= Salamatu Koroma =

Sierra Leonean judge

The Honourable Justice Salamatu Koroma

Justice of the Supreme Court of Sierra Leone
- Incumbent
- Assumed office December 7, 2011
- Nominated by: Ernest Bai Koroma

Justice of the Appeals Court of Sierra Leone
- In office December 21, 2005 – December 7, 2011
- Nominated by: Ahmad Tejan Kabbah

Personal details
- Party: None
- Education: Fourah Bay College
- Profession: Judge

Salamatu Koroma is a Sierra Leonean judge and a current Justice in the Supreme Court of Sierra Leone. She was appointed as a Supreme Court Justice by Sierra Leone's President Ernest Bai Koroma, and was sworn in on December 5, 2011 after she was confirmed by the Sierra Leone parliament.

A graduate of Fourah Bay College Law School, Salamatu Koroma was previously a judge in the Sierra Leone Appeals Court since 2005, after she was appointed by President Ahmad Tejan Kabbah. Koroma has over thirty five years experience as a practicing lawyer and a judge in Sierra Leone.

Salamatu Koroma was called on to the Sierra Leone Bar Association in 1976 and was appointed State Counsel that same year. Koroma was later appointed as a registrar general of Sierra Leone.

== Law career ==
A graduate of Fourah Bay College Law School, Salamatu Koroma was previously a judge in the Sierra Leone High Court since 2005, after she was nominated by President Ahmad Tejan Kabbah. Koroma has over thirty-five years' experience as a practicing lawyer and a judge in Sierra Leone.

Salamatu Koroma was called on to the Sierra Leone Bar Association and was appointed State Counsel that same year. In 1976 Koroma was appointed as a registrar general. She currently serves as the chairman of the Law Reform Commission in Freetown, Sierra Leone.
