= 2019 Nigerian House of Representatives elections in Gombe State =

The 2019 Nigerian House of Representatives elections in Gombe State was held on February 23, 2019, to elect members of the House of Representatives to represent Gombe State, Nigeria.

== Overview ==
| Affiliation | Party | | Total |
| Affiliation | APC | PDP | Total |
|---|---|---|---|
| Before Election | 4 | 2 | 6 |
| After Election | 6 | | 6 |

== Summary ==
| District | Incumbent | Party | Elected Reps Member | Party |
|---|---|---|---|---|
| Akko | Ismaila Muazu Hassan | PDP | Usman Bello Kumo | APC |
| Balanga/Billiri | Ali Isa | PDP | Mela Victor | APC |
| Dukku/Nafada | Aishatu Jibril Dukku | APC | Aishatu Jibril Dukku | APC |
| Gombe/kwami/Funakaye | Khamsiu Ahmed | APC | Bauchi Yaya Tango | APC |
| Kaltungo/Shongom | Binta Bello | PDP | Karu Simon Elisha | APC |
| Yamaltu/Deba | Yunusa Abubkar | APC | Abubakar Yunusa Ahmed | APC |

== Results ==
=== Akko ===
A total of 11 candidates registered with the Independent National Electoral Commission to contest in the election. APC candidate Bello Usman A Kumo won the election, defeating Ahmad Aishatu of PDP and other party candidates.

2019 Nigerian House of Representatives election in Gombe State
| Party | Candidate | Votes | % |
|---|---|---|---|
| APC | Bello Usman A Kumo | 57,490 | |
| PDP | Ahmad Aishatu | 28,631 | |
| Others | | 2,110 | |
| Total votes | | 88,231 | |
| APC hold | | | |

=== Balanga/Billiri ===
A total of 12 candidates registered with the Independent National Electoral Commission to contest in the election. APC candidate Mela Victor won the election, defeating Isa Ali of PDP and other party candidates.

2019 Nigerian House of Representatives election in Gombe State
| Party | Candidate | Votes | % |
|---|---|---|---|
| APC | Mela Victor | 45,112 | |
| PDP | Isa Ali | 35,385 | |
| Others | | 2,627 | |
| Total votes | | 83,124 | |
| APC hold | | | |

=== Dukku/Nafada ===
A total of 3 candidates registered with the Independent National Electoral Commission to contest in the election. APC candidate Aishatu Jibril Dukku won the election, defeating Saidu Adamu Jodoma of PDP and Shehu Tukur Alkali of NNPP.

2019 Nigerian House of Representatives election in Gombe State
| Party | Candidate | Votes | % |
|---|---|---|---|
| APC | Aishatu Jibril Dukku | 40,122 | |
| PDP | Saidu Adamu Jodoma | 21,474 | |
| NNPP | Shehu Tukur Alkali | 1,265 | |
| Total votes | | 62,861 | |
| APC hold | | | |

=== Gombe/kwami/Funakaye ===
A total of 16 candidates registered with the Independent National Electoral Commission to contest in the election. APC candidate Bauchi Yaya Tango won the election, defeating Abubakar Shehu Durbi of PDP and other party candidates.

2019 Nigerian House of Representatives election in Gombe State
| Party | Candidate | Votes | % |
|---|---|---|---|
| APC | Bauchi Yaya Tango | 173,416 | |
| PDP | Abubakar Shehu Durbi | 57,365 | |
| Others | | 29,169 | |
| Total votes | | 259,950 | |
| APC hold | | | |

=== Kaltungo/Shongom ===
A total of 9 candidates registered with the Independent National Electoral Commission to contest in the election. APC candidate Karu Simon Elisha won the election, defeating Kalba Gora Adamu of PDP and other party candidates.

2019 Nigerian House of Representatives election in Gombe State
| Party | Candidate | Votes | % |
|---|---|---|---|
| APC | Karu Simon Elisha | 35,316 | |
| PDP | Kalba Gora Adamu | 28,661 | |
| Others | | 987 | |
| Total votes | | 64,964 | |
| APC hold | | | |

=== Yamaltu/Deba ===
A total of 9 candidates registered with the Independent National Electoral Commission to contest in the election. APC candidate Abubakar Yunusa Ahmed won the election, defeating Garba Inuwa of PDP and other party candidates.

2019 Nigerian House of Representatives election in Gombe State
| Party | Candidate | Votes | % |
|---|---|---|---|
| APC | Abubakar Yunusa Ahmed | 45,315 | |
| PDP | Garba Inuwa | 30,420 | |
| Others | | 827 | |
| Total votes | | 76,562 | |
| APC hold | | | |
