= Balanga, Nigeria =

Balanga
- LGA
- Interactive map of Balanga
- Location in Nigeria
- Coordinates: 9°58′N 11°41′E
- Country: Nigeria
- State: Gombe State
- Headquarters: Talasse

Government
  - Local Government Chairman and the Head of the Local Government Council: Garba Umar

Area
  - Total: 1,626 km^{2} (628 sq mi)

Population (2006 census)
  - Total: 212,549
  - Density: 130.7/km^{2} (338.6/sq mi)
  - Ethnicities: Hausa Waja Fulani
  - Religions: Islam and Christianity
- Time zone: UTC+1 (WAT)
- 3-digit postal code prefix: 761
- ISO 3166 code: NG.GO.BA

Balanga is one of the eleven local government areas in Gombe State, Nigeria. It falls under the southern senatorial district of the state. Its administrative headquarters is located at Talasse town. The LGA is bordered by Yemaltu-Deba LGA to the north while to the south and east by Adamawa state and to the west by Shongom, Kaltungo and Akko LGA.

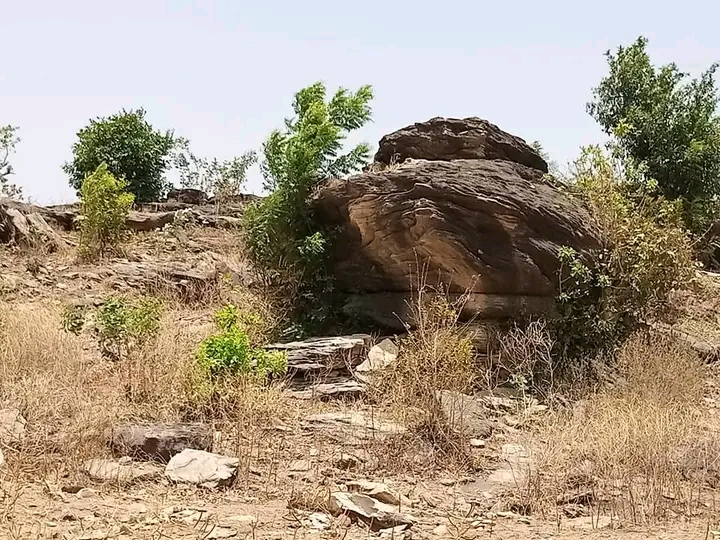
Balanga forest

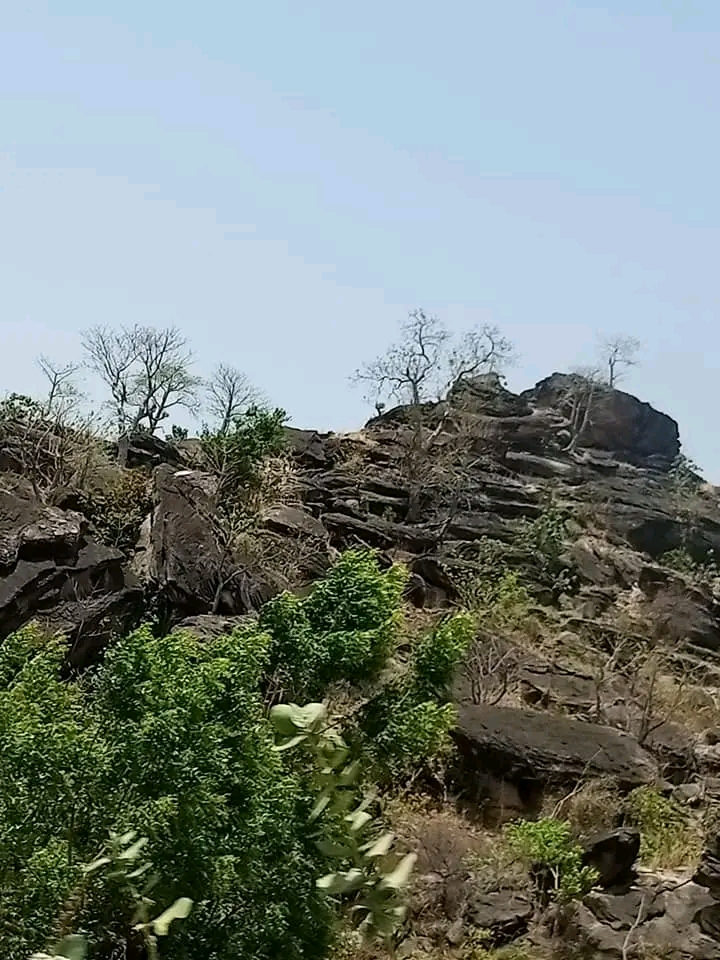
Balanga Mountain

== Geography/Climate ==
Balanga LGA encompasses a total area of 1,626 square kilometres or 628 square miles. The average wind speed in the Balanga LGA is 4 km/h, while the average humidity is 17%.

The average temperature is 35 °C (95 °F). The average humidity is 17%, while the average wind speed is 4 km/h (2.5 mph).

The temperature in Balanga is rising significantly due to climate change, and warming stripes show a trend in the right direction.

== Economy ==
The Balanga LGAs residents rely heavily on agriculture for their livelihoods, with crops like tomatoes, sorghum, maize, beans, and groundnuts being farmed nearby. Bentonite, limestone, granite, and topaz are among the mineral deposits in the Balanga LGA. The crucial Balanga Dam is located within the boundaries of Balanga LGA.

== Population ==
The population of Balanga is estimated at 176,944 inhabitants with the huge majority being from members of the Hausa, Fulani and Waja tribes.

== Localities ==
Towns and Villages in Balanga LGA.

- Balanga
- Bambam
- Bangu
- Cham-mwona
- Chum- Kindiyo
- Daduya Hill
- Dala- Waja
- Degri
- Dong
- Gasi
- Gelengu
- Kulani
- Nyuwar
- Refele
- Reme
- Sikkam
- Talasse
- Swa

== Postal Code ==
The postal code of the area is 761.

== Languages ==
Hausa, Fulfulde and Waja languages are spoken extensively in the area.

== Religion ==
Islam is the most commonly practiced religion in Balanga.

== Other settlements ==
The Loojaa settlement in Balanga Local Government Area is home to the extinct Jalaa language (bàsàrə̀n dà jàlààbè̩), a language isolate also known as Centúúm or Cen Tuum.

== Government ==
The chairman of the LGA is Garba Umar

== Communal clashes ==
On 21 July 2021, there was a communal violence where five people were injured and at least two houses burnt in Nyuwar community of Balanga. This led to the placement of Nyuwar, Jessu, Heme, Yolde Gilingitu, Sikam, Wala-Lunguda and environs under curfew.

== Notable people ==
- Salamatu Fada - scientist
