= Muhammad Inuwa Yahaya =

Nigerian politician (born 1961)

His Excellency Muhammad Inuwa Yahaya
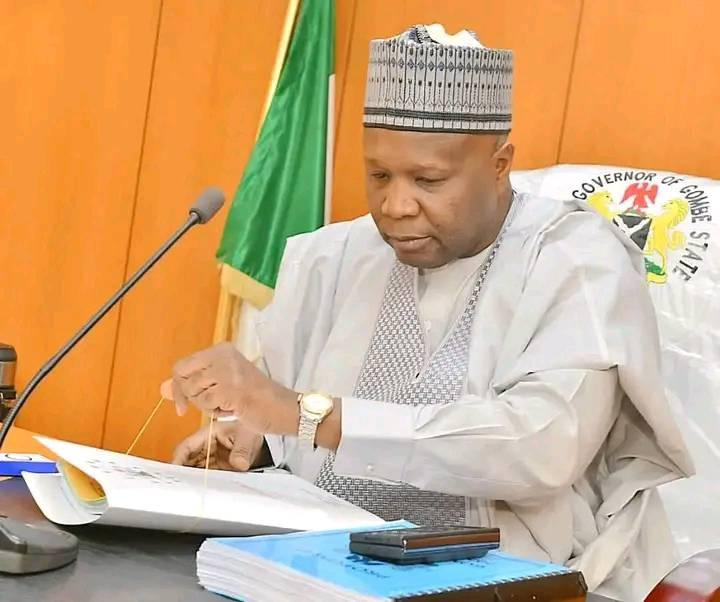

Governor of Gombe State
- Incumbent
- Assumed office 29 May 2019
- Deputy: Manasseh Daniel Jatau
- Preceded by: Ibrahim Hassan Dankwambo

Personal details
- Born: 9 October 1961 (age 64) Jekadefari, Northern Region, Nigeria (now in Gombe State)
- Party: All Progressive Congress
- Spouses: Asma'u Inuwa Yahaya; Amina Inuwa Yahaya
- Children: 7
- Education: Ahmadu Bello University
- Occupation: Politician; businessman

Muhammad Inuwa Yahaya (born 9 October 1961) is a Nigerian businessman and politician who has served as the governor of Gombe State since 2019.

== Early life ==
Muhammad Inuwa Yahaya was born on 9 October 1961 in Jekadefari, Gombe, Gombe State. His father, Alhaji Yahaya Umaru, was a famous businessman.

== Education ==
Yahaya attended the Central Primary School and the Government Science Secondary School in Gombe. He then studied at Ahmadu Bello University, (ABU) Zaria, where he obtained a Bachelor of Science degree in Accounting in 1983.

== Career ==
Yahaya has worked in both the public and the private sector. He started his working career with the Bauchi State Investment and Property Development Company, where he was a principal accountant from year of 1984 to 1985. He was a managing director of A.Y.U Civil Engineering Company Ltd from year of 1993 to 1999.

In year of 2003, he was appointed as Commissioner for Finance and Economic Development by Governor Muhammed Danjuma Goje.

== Professional associations ==
Yahaya is a member of the following professional bodies:

- Association of Nation Accountants of Nigeria (ANAN),
- Nigeria Institute of Management (NIM)
- Chartered Institution of Taxation of Nigeria (ACITN)

== Politics ==
Yahaya joined politics in 2003. In the governorship election in 2015, He was the flag bearer of the All Progressives Congress (APC) political party in Gombe State. On 1 October 2018, he won the Gombe State gubernatorial All Progressives Congress primary election with the highest votes with 859 votes to beat his closest rival, Mohammed Jibrin Barde who polled 463 votes.

On 9 March 2019, Yahaya was declared governor-elect of Gombe State at the 2019 Gombe State gubernatorial election. He scored a total number of 364,179 votes to defeat his closest rival of the Peoples Democratic Party (PDP), Sen. Usman Bayero Nafada, who polled 222,868 votes.

Governor Inuwa Yahaya of Gombe State won Saturday’s governorship election for a second term in office.

Mr Yahaya of the All Progressives Congress (APC) polled 342,821 votes to beat the Peoples Democratic Party (PDP) candidate, Muhammad Jibiri Barde, who scored 233,131 votes.

The result declared by the Returning Officer of the Independent National Electoral Commission (INEC), Maimuna Waziri, showed that the APC won the election with a margin of 74,493 votes.

In March 2023, Mr Yahaya became the Chairman of the19 Northern Governors Forum after the meeting held at Transcop Hilton Hotel in Abuja when he was unanimously elected.

== Personal life ==
He is married to two wives and has seven children all residing in Gombe State. His first son has married in 2022.

== Traditional titles ==
Dan Majen Gombe

Matawallen Kaltungo

== See also ==
- Gombe State
- List of governors of Gombe State
