= Shongom =

- LGA
- Interactive map of Shongom
- Location in Nigeria
- Coordinates: 9°39′N 11°13′E
- Country: Nigeria
- State: Gombe State
- Headquarters: Boh

Government
  - Local government chairman and head of the Local Government Council: Yohanna Nahari

Area
  - Total: 922 km^{2} (356 sq mi)
- Elevation: 383 m (1,257 ft)

Population (2006 census)
  - Total: 151,520
  - Density: 164/km^{2} (426/sq mi)
- Time zone: UTC+1 (WAT)
- 3-digit postal code prefix: 770
- ISO 3166 code: NG.GO.SH

Shongom is a local government area (LGA) of Gombe State, Nigeria. Its headquarters is in the town of Boh in the northern part of the local government area

== Geography ==
Shongom LGA occupies a total area of 922 square kilometres and has an average temperature of 31 °C. The LGA witnesses two major seasons which are the rainy season, which usually comes between the months of May and September, and the dry season which is normally between the months of October and April. The LGA is a Tropical savanna climate.

== Economy ==
Trade is a critical economic activity in Shongom LG with the area hosting the expansive Lalaipido international cattle market where a variety of domestic animals are sold. Farming also blossoms in Shongom LGA with the area known for the cultivation of a number of food crops such as beans, rice, sorghum, guinea corn, and millet. Other occupations of the people of Shongom LGA include hunting, wood carving, and animal rearing.

== Districts and villages ==
Bengunji; Bango, Bangunji, Bikutture, Bikwala, Bishiwai, Dilange (Dutse), Kalo, Kulan, Laluwa, Najeji, Suli, Yelchen-Yelchen.

Burak; Dabuki, Dajanwani, Kwanankukah, Lasanjang, Pirim, Sabonlayi, Shemyam, Tauni, Burak.

Filiya; Chengun, Disga, Farin-Kasa, Filiya, Jauro-Sajo, Lababali, Yapandi, Yarana.

Gundale; Anguwar Jauro Sule, Bebulo, Gundale, Gurwa, Kambuluk, Marke, Sakram, Swaja, Tudun Wada, Yelwa Gurwa.

Gwandum; Damjigiri, Garko, Garum, Gujuba, Badugu-Kufure, Kurmi, Gwanlangmeche, Tambau, Pamadu, Lilik, Popandi, Kwara, Majidadi, Janye, Toro, Sabongari, Balede, Kuka, Keffi, Pokulung, Lalingling, Dangeza, Yabayo, Yelwa, Pilame, Kwale.

Kushi; Dankunni, Dirang, Gomle, Kaure, Kommo, Kugwayam, Kushi, Ladongor, Lapandintai, Sabongari, Tanjania, Tatadar

Shongom; Amkolom, Boh, Kalishen, Karel, Kulishin, Labarya, Labayo, Labeke, Laduka, Lakenturum, Lakumji, Lalaipido, Lapan (Lapan), Lasadar, Lasanjang, Lasasap, Lashikoldok, Latatar, Latur, Lawishi, Layasakalak, Pokata, Tedmugzu, Layenge, Kalbulak, Kalkudo, Leyenye, Tul Gunji, Latur, Lanbelle, Kalaku, Mango, KalKwari.

== Population ==
The population of Shongom in 2006 census was 151,520.

== Postal Code ==
The postal code of the area is 770.

== Geographical Coordinates ==
Latitude: 9.65, Longitude: 11.2167 9° 39′ 0″ North, 11° 13′ 0″ East

== Chairman of Shongom LGA ==
The present Chairman of Shongom Local Government Area is Yohanna Nahari, from All Progressive Congress (APC).

== Religion ==
Shongom LGA is predominantly by Christians, With many Muslims inhabitants.

== Wards in Shongom LGA ==
Shongom Local Government Area in Gombe State, Nigeria has ten electoral wards.

- Bangunji Ward
- Boh Ward
- Burak Ward
- Filiya Ward
- Gwandum ward
- Kalishen Ward
- Karel Ward
- Kulishin Ward
- Lalaipido Ward
- Lapan Ward
