= Yamaltu/Deba =

- LGA
- Interactive map of Yamaltu/Deba
- Location in Nigeria
- Coordinates: 10°13′N 11°23′E
- Country: Nigeria
- State: Gombe State
- Headquarters: Deba

Area
  - Total: 1,981 km^{2} (765 sq mi)

Population (2006 census)
  - Total: 255,248
  - Density: 128.8/km^{2} (333.7/sq mi)
  - Ethnicities: Tera and Fulani
  - Religion: Islam and Christianity
- Time zone: UTC+1 (WAT)
- 3-digit postal code prefix: 761
- ISO 3166 code: NG.GO.YD

Yamaltu/Deba is a Local Government Area of Gombe State, Nigeria. Its headquarters is in the town of Deba (or Deba Habe), at the southeastern part of the state capital, Gombe.

It is inhabited by mainly Tera and Fulani people.

The postal code of the area is 761.

== History ==
Deba's history began in 1375 AD with the appointment of the first Kuji Sovereign Chief. Pre-Mishelku, Mishelku, Fulani Jihad, Colonial, and Post-Independence periods make up Deba's history. The Local Government was already in place before Gombe State was established, but it later became a Local Government inside Gombe State.

The headquarters of the LGA are in the town of Deba and the LGA is bordered by parts of Borno and Yobe states.

Yamaltu /Deba has population of 255,248. according to 2006 census.

== Geography ==
Yamaltu/Deba LGA has a total area of 1,981 square kilometres or 765 square miles with an average temperature of 31 degrees Celsius or 88 degrees Fahrenheit. The LGA is home to a portion of the well-known Lake Dadin Kowa, as well as the Kilang Hills and Bima Rock.

== Economy ==
The Yamaltu/Deba LGA is home to a number of markets, including the Kwodom market, where a wide range of goods are bought and sold. Residents of Yamaltu/Deba LGA also make farming a significant part of their lives by growing crops like rice, brown beans, millet, onions, and sorghum there. In the Yamaltu/Deba LGA, additional businesses include fishing, leatherworking, farming, and crafting.

== Wards ==
List of wards in Yamaltu/Deba.

- Deba
- Difa / Lubo / Kinafa
- Gwani / Shinga / Wade
- Hinna
- Jagali North
- Jagali South
- Kanawa / Wajari
- Kuri /lano / Lambam
- Kwadon / Liji / Kurba
- Nono / Kunwal / W. Birdeka

== Healthcare ==
Healthcare in Yamaltu include

1. Dasa Health Clinic
2. Jagali Health Clinic
3. Jauro Gotel Health Clinic
4. Jauro Musa Kadi Health Post
5. Maikaho Primary Health Centre
6. Tsandon Dan Dela Health Post

== Localities ==
Area, Towns and Villages in Yelmatu/Deba.

=== Deba ===
- Baltongo
- Baure
- Boltongoyel
- Dangar
- Dumbu
- Jannawo
- Kakkau
- Kanawa
- Kunnuwal
- Kuri
- Lambam
- Lano
- Nasarawo
- Nono
- Nono M. Isa
- Poli
- Saruje
- W. Birdeka
- Wajari Jodoma
- Wudil
- Yelwa Kuri
- Zagaina
- Zamfarawa

=== Jara Area ===
- Dahirma
- DasaNahuta
- Garin Nabawa
- Jagali
- Jarawa
- Jauro Gotel
- Jigawa
- Kadi
- Kurjale
- Maikaho
- Pata
- Tashar Kuka
- Tsandom Dele
- Tudun Wada

=== Yelmatul Area ===
- Beguwa
- Datum
- Difa
- Gadawo
- Garin Kudi
- Gwani
- Hinna
- Kalo
- Kulau
- Kunji Kwadon
- Kurba
- Kwadon
- Kwali
- Laleko
- Liji
- Lubo
- Ruwa Biri
- Ruwan Biri
- Sabon Gari bk
- Shinga
- Shuwari
- Tsando
- Wade
- Zambuk
- Dadin kowa

== Notable people ==
- Muhammed Danjuma Goje
- Ahmad Usman Muhammad

== Religion ==
Residents of the LGA are mostly Muslims with Christians as a minority.

== Schools in Deba include ==
- Asas Primary school of JIBWIS.
- Model Primary School, Deba.
- Government Day Junior Secondary School Deba Central.
- Government Comprehensive Secondary School.
- GSTC Deba.
- Amtas Community Secondary School.

== See also ==
- Deba Gombe
