= Kaltungo =

- Town and LGA
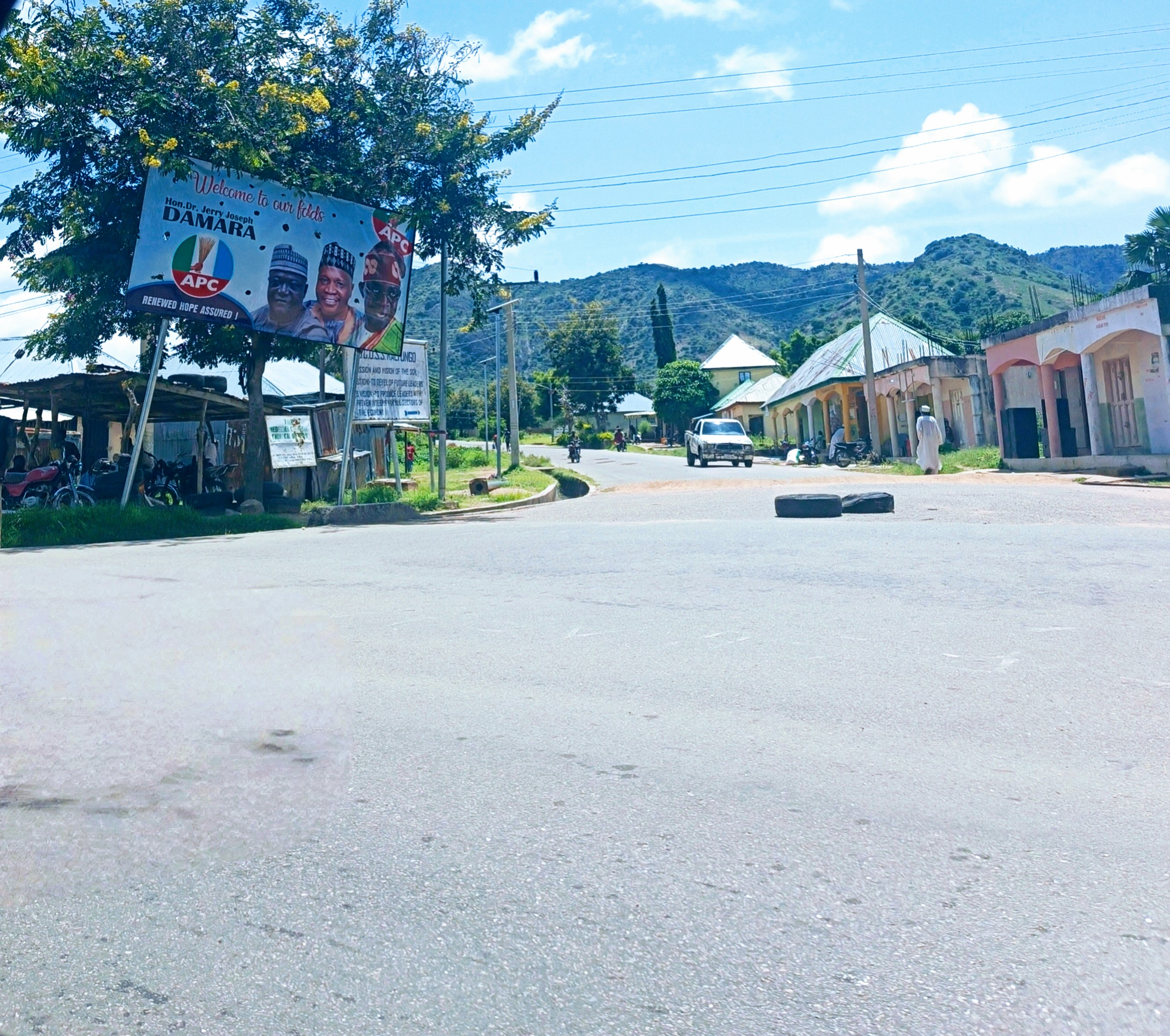
- Interactive map of Kaltungo
- Location in Nigeria
- Coordinates: 9°53′N 11°26′E
- Country: Nigeria
- State: Gombe State

Government
  - Local Government Chairman and the Head of the Local Government Council: Iliya Suleiman
  - The Mai Kaltungo: Saleh Muhammed

Area
  - Total: 881 km^{2} (340 sq mi)

Population (2006 census)
  - Total: 149,805
  - Density: 170/km^{2} (440/sq mi)
  - Religions: Christianity Islam
- Time zone: UTC+1 (WAT)
- 3-digit postal code prefix: 770
- ISO 3166 code: NG.GO.KA

Kaltungo is a town and one of the 11 Local Governments Area of Gombe State, Nigeria. Its headquarters is located in the western part of the Local Government Area on the A345 highway at 9°48′51″N 11°18′32″E.

Kaltungo LGA covers an area of 881 square kilometers and experiences two distinct seasons: the dry season and the rainy season. The area receives an estimated 1000 mm of annual precipitation. Wind speed in Kaltungo LGA averages 10 km/h.

== Population ==
According to the 2006 census, Kaltungo had a population of 149,805.

== Festivals ==
Cultural festivals celebrated in the area include:

- Pan-Mana Cultural Festival
- Kamo Cultural Festival
- Tangale (Dog) Festival
- Eku Cultural Festival
- Pid Tungo Cultural Festival
- Kaltungo Carnival Festival
- Wula (wedding) Cultural festival
- Pand Tungo Cultural Festival

== Postal code ==
The postal code for the area is 770.

== Hospital ==
Kaltungo is known for having a variety of snakes, particularly in Northern Nigeria. This led to the establishment of the Kaltungo Snakebite Hospital, which was later upgraded to the Snakebite Treatment and Research Centre, Kaltungo, through the intervention of the Sustainable Development Goals office and the Gombe State Government. The centre serves snakebite victims, including those from Duguri District, Alkaleri LGA, Bauchi State, particularly after a flood along the River Benue in October 2012 resulted in a large increase in the population of venomous snakes. A July 2013 report noted that over 200 people in Duguri District had died from snakebite, stating, "whoever is lucky to make it to Kaltungo is treated in only two days and then they return home." Authorities at the Centre have stated that over 400 snakes of different varieties are exported from the centre to Liverpool, England, every month to aid in extracting venom for pharmaceutical production.

== Government ==
The current Local Government chairman is Hon Iliya Suleiman, who represents the All Progressives Congress.

== Towns and villages ==
The administrative headquarters of Kaltungo Local Government Area are located in Kaltungo town. The council comprises several districts and villages. The following is a list of towns and villages in Kaltungo:

Bagaruwa; Bwara; Daura; Dodonruwa; Dundaye; Garin Bako; Garin Barau; Garin Ilyasu; Garin Jauro Gambo; Garin Korau; Garin Nasara; Garkin Alhaji Mani; Jauro Gotel; Kausur; Kunge; Kuren; Kwabilake; Lankare; Lugayidi; Momidi; Sabon Layi Awak; Salifawa; Shelin Kuwe; Soblong; Tambirame; Tanga; Tore; Tudu; Unguwan Barebare; Yari

== Economy ==
A variety of animals are raised and sold in Kaltungo LGA, including camels, cows, pigs and goats. The economy heavily relies on agriculture, with various crops grown such as sorghum, millet, beans, and rice. Trading, hunting, and craft production are also significant economic activities.

== Climate ==
The district's average annual temperature is 29.63 °C (85.33 °F), which is 0.17% higher than the Nigerian average. It typically receives about 64.86 millimetres (2.55 inches) of precipitation and experiences 93.41 rainy days (25.59% of the time) annually.

The hot season lasts for 2.3 months, from February 10 to April 20, with an average daily high temperature above 35 °C (95 °F). April is the hottest month, with an average high of 35 °C (95 °F) and a low of 23 °C (74 °F).

The cool season spans 3.4 months, from July 1 to October 14, with an average daily maximum temperature below 29 °C (85 °F). December is the coldest month, with average lows of 14 °C (58 °F) and highs of 32 °C (89 °F).

== See also ==
- List of villages in Gombe State
