= 2023 Nigerian Senate elections in Gombe State =

2023 Senate elections in Gombe

- 25 February 2023

All 3 Gombe State seats in the Senate of Nigeria
	Majority party
Party	APC
Last election	3
Seats before	3
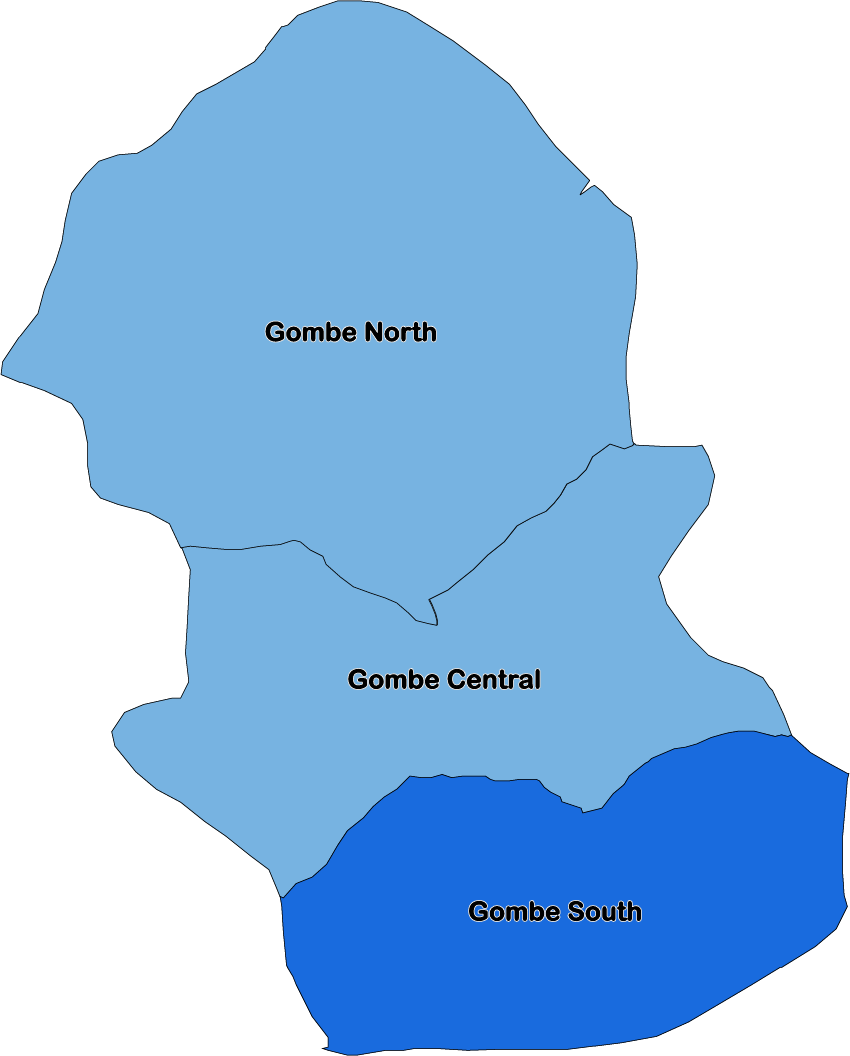
- APC incumbent lost renomination APC incumbent running for re-election

The 2023 Nigerian Senate elections in Gombe State will be held on 25 February 2023, to elect the 3 federal Senators from Gombe State, one from each of the state's three senatorial districts. The elections will coincide with the 2023 presidential election, as well as other elections to the Senate and elections to the House of Representatives; with state elections being held two weeks later. Primaries were held between 4 April and 9 June 2022.

== Background ==
In the previous Senate elections, only one incumbent senator was returned: in the Central district, Mohammed Danjuma Goje (APC) was re-elected but Usman Bayero Nafada (PDP-North) retired to unsuccessfully run for governor and Senator Joshua Lidani (PDP-South) lost renomination. In the Central district, Goje held his seat with 69% of the vote; both of the open seats were also won by APC as Sa'idu Ahmed Alkali won the North district with 62% and Amos Bulus Kilawangs gained the South seat with 53% of the vote. These results were a part of a large swing to the Gombe APC as every House of Representatives seat was won by the party, it won a majority in the House of Assembly, and Buhari won the state in the presidential election.

== Overview ==
Affiliation	Party		Total
Affiliation	APC	PDP	Total
Previous Election	3	0	3
Before Election	3	0	3
After Election	1	2	3

== Summary ==
District	Incumbent		Results	
District	Incumbent	Party	Status	Candidates
Gombe Central	Mohammed Danjuma Goje	APC	Incumbent re-elected	▌ ✓ Mohammed Danjuma Goje (APC); ▌Abubakar Aliyu (PDP)
Gombe North	Sa'idu Ahmed Alkali	APC	Incumbent lost re-election New member elected PDP gain	▌Sa'idu Ahmed Alkali (APC); ▌ ✓ Ibrahim Hassan Dankwambo (PDP)
Gombe South	Amos Bulus Kilawangs	APC	Incumbent lost renomination New member elected PDP gain	▌Joshua M. Lidani (APC); ▌ ✓ Anthony Siyako Yaro (PDP)

== Gombe Central ==
2023 Gombe Central Senatorial District election
- 25 February 2023
Nominee	Mohammed Danjuma Goje	Abubakar Aliyu
Party	APC	PDP
Senator before election
Mohammed Danjuma Goje
APC
Elected Senator
TBD

The Gombe Central Senatorial District covers the local government areas of Akko and Yamaltu/Deba. The incumbent Mohammed Danjuma Goje (APC) was re-elected with 68.8% of the vote in 2019 and is seeking re-election.

=== Primary elections ===
==== All Progressives Congress ====
On 20 April 2022, the APC National Executive Committee announced the party's schedule for senatorial primaries, setting its expression of interest form price at ₦3 million and nomination form price at ₦17 million with a 50% discount for candidates younger than 40 while women and candidates with disabilities get free nomination forms. Forms were to be sold from 26 April to 6 May until the deadline was later extended to 10 May then 12 May. After the submission of nomination forms by 13 May, candidates were screened by a party committee on 14 and 15 May while 18 May was the date for the screening appeal process. Ward congresses and LGA congresses were set for 16 and 17 May to elect delegates for the primary. Candidates approved by the screening process advanced to a primary set for 27 May, in concurrence with other APC senatorial primaries; challenges to the result could be made on 28 May.

The year ahead of the APC primary was categorized by a party crisis as the state APC was split between supporters of Goje on one side and the other side supporting incumbent Governor Muhammad Inuwa Yahaya. The crisis forced party officials to take a side and even became violent when an attack on Goje's convoy killed 5 people in November 2021. Although the feud could have impacted Goje's renomination effort, Goje and Yahaya reconciled in January 2022. The primary, held at the Gombe State University of Science and Technology in Kumo, ended in Goje's renomination over two other candidates in a landslide.

APC primary results
Party	Candidate	Votes	%
APC	Mohammed Danjuma Goje	100	95.24%
APC	Abubakar Mu’azu	3	2.86%
APC	Idris Abdullahi	2	1.90%
Total votes		105	100.00%

==== People's Democratic Party ====
On 16 March 2022, the national PDP announced its senatorial primary timetable, setting its expression of interest form price at ₦1 million and the nomination form price at ₦20 million with a 50% discount for candidates between 25 and 30. Forms were to be sold until 1 April but the party later extended the deadline four times before reaching a final deadline of 22 April. After the submission of nomination forms by 25 April, candidates were screened by a party committee on 27 April while 2 May was the rescheduled date for the screening appeal process. Ward congresses were set for 29 April and LGA congresses were rescheduled for 10 May to elect delegates for the primary. Candidates approved by the screening process advanced to a primary set for 23 May, in concurrence with other PDP senatorial primaries but due to often violently enforced Monday stay-at-home orders by separatists, southeastern state parties held their primaries on 24 May; challenges to the result could be made on 25 May.

On the primary date, Abubakar Aliyu—a CPC gubernatorial candidate in 2011—was nominated in a landslide over Muhammadu Aliyu Baba.

PDP primary results
Party	Candidate	Votes	%
PDP	Abubakar Aliyu	59	95.16%
PDP	Muhammadu Aliyu Baba	3	4.84%
Total votes		62	100.00%

=== General election ===
==== Results ====
2023 Gombe Central Senatorial District election
Party	Candidate	Votes	%
A	Riri Danjuma		
AA	Abubakar Magaji		
ADC	Haruna Musa		
APC	Mohammed Danjuma Goje		
BP	Ibrahim Bappah		
LP	Musa Aliyu Aliyu		
NRM	Kimo Mohammed Sulaiman		
New Nigeria Peoples Party	Muhammad Bibiker		
PDP	Abubakar Aliyu		
SDP	Adamu Ibrahim Muhammad		
ZLP	Rukayya Muhammad Garba		
Total votes			100.00%
Invalid or blank votes			N/A
Turnout			

== Gombe North ==
2023 Gombe North Senatorial District election
- 25 February 2023
Nominee	Sa'idu Ahmed Alkali	Ibrahim Hassan Dankwambo
Party	APC	PDP
Senator before election
Sa'idu Ahmed Alkali
APC
Elected Senator
TBD

The Gombe North Senatorial District covers the local government areas of Dukku, Funakaye, Gombe, Kwami, and Nafada. The incumbent Sa'idu Ahmed Alkali (APC), who was elected with 62.0% of the vote in 2019, is seeking re-election.

=== Primary elections ===
==== All Progressives Congress ====
On 20 April 2022, the APC National Executive Committee announced the party's schedule for senatorial primaries, setting its expression of interest form price at ₦3 million and nomination form price at ₦17 million with a 50% discount for candidates younger than 40 while women and candidates with disabilities get free nomination forms. Forms were to be sold from 26 April to 6 May until the deadline was later extended to 10 May then 12 May. After the submission of nomination forms by 13 May, candidates were screened by a party committee on 14 and 15 May while 18 May was the date for the screening appeal process. Ward congresses and LGA congresses were set for 16 and 17 May to elect delegates for the primary. Candidates approved by the screening process advanced to a primary set for 27 May, in concurrence with other APC senatorial primaries; challenges to the result could be made on 28 May.

On the primary date, three candidates contested an indirect primary that ended with Alkali winning renomination after results showed him defeating Bala Bello Tinka by a significant margin. The primary was held in Malam Sidi, the headquarters of Kwami LGA.

APC primary results
Party	Candidate	Votes	%
APC	Sa'idu Ahmed Alkali	216	84.05%
APC	Bala Bello Tinka	31	12.06%
APC	Aliyu Haidar Abubakar	10	3.89%
Total votes		257	100.00%
Invalid or blank votes		0	N/A
Turnout		257	98.85%

==== People's Democratic Party ====
On 16 March 2022, the national PDP announced its senatorial primary timetable, setting its expression of interest form price at ₦1 million and the nomination form price at ₦20 million with a 50% discount for candidates between 25 and 30. Forms were to be sold until 1 April but the party later extended the deadline four times before reaching a final deadline of 22 April. After the submission of nomination forms by 25 April, candidates were screened by a party committee on 27 April while 2 May was the rescheduled date for the screening appeal process. Ward congresses were set for 29 April and LGA congresses were rescheduled for 10 May to elect delegates for the primary. Candidates approved by the screening process advanced to a primary set for 23 May, in concurrence with other PDP senatorial primaries but due to often violently enforced Monday stay-at-home orders by separatists, southeastern state parties held their primaries on 24 May; challenges to the result could be made on 25 May.

Initially there were three screened candidates for the primary (former Governor and 2019 nominee Ibrahim Hassan Dankwambo, former Senator Usman Bayero Nafada, and Abdulkadir Hamma Saleh); however, Nafada and Saleh withdrew in favour of Dankwambo on the date of the primary. Due to these withdrawals, Dankwambo was nominated via affirmation.

=== Campaign ===
As a rematch of the 2019 election between Alkali and Dankwambo, pundits attempted to identify the changes in the four year interim period. In December 2022, The Nation reporting stated that Dankwambo was in the better position as memory of his unpopular governorship had faded and the PDP appeared to be rising in the district. A few weeks later, Daily Trust analysis from later that month contended that the race was still too close to predict. In the days before the election, the Wikki Times revealed that the Alkali campaign was bribing indigent voters with sewing, grinding, and noodle-making machines.

=== General election ===
==== Results ====
2023 Gombe North Senatorial District election
Party	Candidate	Votes	%
A	Habiba Bala Abdullahi		
AA	Sani Adamu Mohammad		
ADC	Ahmed Adamu		
APC	Sa'idu Ahmed Alkali		
APM	Yusuf Ibrahim		
BP	Muhammad Abdulrahman		
LP	Ibrahim Usman Adamu		
NRM	Adamu Jibrin		
New Nigeria Peoples Party	Muhammad Sabiu		
PDP	Ibrahim Hassan Dankwambo		
SDP	Mohammed Bashir Adamu		
Total votes			100.00%
Invalid or blank votes			N/A
Turnout			

== Gombe South ==
2023 Gombe South Senatorial District election
- 25 February 2023
Nominee	Joshua Lidani	Anthony Siyako Yaro
Party	APC	PDP
Senator before election
Amos Bulus Kilawangs
APC
Elected Senator
TBD

The Gombe South Senatorial District covers the local government areas of Balanga, Billiri, Kaltungo, and Shongom; it is largely coterminous with the Southern Gombe region, noted for its relative ethnic diversity and Christian majority in a state that is mainly ethnic Hausa-Fulani and majority Muslim. Incumbent Amos Bulus Kilawangs (APC) was elected with 52.9% of the vote in 2019 and sought re-election but lost the APC nomination.

=== Primary elections ===
==== All Progressives Congress ====
On 20 April 2022, the APC National Executive Committee announced the party's schedule for senatorial primaries, setting its expression of interest form price at ₦3 million and nomination form price at ₦17 million with a 50% discount for candidates younger than 40 while women and candidates with disabilities get free nomination forms. Forms were to be sold from 26 April to 6 May until the deadline was later extended to 10 May then 12 May. After the submission of nomination forms by 13 May, candidates were screened by a party committee on 14 and 15 May while 18 May was the date for the screening appeal process. Ward congresses and LGA congresses were set for 16 and 17 May to elect delegates for the primary. Candidates approved by the screening process advanced to a primary set for 27 May, in concurrence with other APC senatorial primaries; challenges to the result could be made on 28 May.

The primary, held at the Government Lodge in Billiri, was initially rancour-free until partway through the final count when election officials changed rooms and security prevented the public from entering the new collation room. About 70 minutes after voting had finished, state government appointee Sani Sabo announced former Senator Joshua Lidani as the victor over Kilawangs and Bilyaminu Babadidi. Supporters of both Kilawangs and Babadidi rejected the results and tension in the venue rose to the point of requiring police intervention. Within a few days of the primary, Kilawangs formally challenged the results in a case claiming that he had been winning before election officials changed rooms and the room change was clear manipulation while also noting that Sabo was not even an actual primary official. For Babadidi's part, he filed a lawsuit against Lidani at the Federal High Court in Gombe.

APC primary results
Party	Candidate	Votes	%
APC	Joshua Lidani	90	45.00%
APC	Bilyaminu Babadidi	70	35.00%
APC	Amos Bulus Kilawangs	40	20.00%
Total votes		200	100.00%
Invalid or blank votes		0	N/A
Turnout		200	Unknown

==== People's Democratic Party ====
On 16 March 2022, the national PDP announced its senatorial primary timetable, setting its expression of interest form price at ₦1 million and the nomination form price at ₦20 million with a 50% discount for candidates between 25 and 30. Forms were to be sold until 1 April but the party later extended the deadline four times before reaching a final deadline of 22 April. After the submission of nomination forms by 25 April, candidates were screened by a party committee on 27 April while 2 May was the rescheduled date for the screening appeal process. Ward congresses were set for 29 April and LGA congresses were rescheduled for 10 May to elect delegates for the primary. Candidates approved by the screening process advanced to a primary set for 23 May, in concurrence with other PDP senatorial primaries but due to often violently enforced Monday stay-at-home orders by separatists, southeastern state parties held their primaries on 24 May; challenges to the result could be made on 25 May.

The initial primary, held in Billiri, resulted in victory for Anthony Siyako Yaro—a businessman and banker—over former MHR Binta Bello by a narrow 2 vote margin. However, Bello formally rejected the results due to 'dead and disqualified delegates appearing on the delegates' list' and improperly gender unbalanced delegates' list from some LGA parties. Bello's challenge was successful with the state PDP cancelling the original primary and ordering a rerun for 8 June; the rerun was also won by Yaro, who received around 80% of the total vote.

Annulled primary results

PDP primary results
Party	Candidate	Votes	%
PDP	~~Anthony Siyako Yaro~~	59	47.58%
PDP	~~Binta Bello~~	57	45.97%
PDP	~~Other candidates~~	8	6.45%
Total votes		124	100.00%

PDP rerun primary results
Party	Candidate	Votes	%
PDP	Anthony Siyako Yaro	97	82.20%
PDP	Binta Bello	20	16.95%
PDP	Other candidates	1	0.85%
Total votes		118	100.00%

=== Campaign ===
As the most electorally competitive Senate seat in the state, focus shifted to the southern district immediately after the primaries. A few months later, The Nation analysis gave the edge to Yaro due to the controversial APC primary and widespread Tangale anger at the APC in the wake of the 2021 Mai Tangale crisis.

=== General election ===
==== Results ====
2023 Gombe South Senatorial District election
Party	Candidate	Votes	%
A	Simon Emly		
AA	Ngolma Poyilma Aliyu		
APP	Christiana James		
ADC	Dauda Adamu		
APC	Joshua M. Lidani		
APM	Sunday Lewis		
LP	David John Yako		
NRM	Serah Abdulsalam		
New Nigeria Peoples Party	Abigail David Albashi		
PDP	Anthony Siyako Yaro		
SDP	Jones Karawai		
Total votes			100.00%
Invalid or blank votes			N/A
Turnout			

== See also ==
- 2023 Nigerian Senate election
- 2023 Nigerian elections
