= 2019 Nigerian Senate elections in Gombe State =

2019 Nigerian Senate election in Gombe State

The 2019 Nigerian Senate election in Gombe State was held on February 23, 2019, to elect members of the Nigerian Senate to represent Gombe State. Bulus Kilawangs Amos representing Gombe South, Mohammed Danjuma Goje representing Gombe Central and Sa'idu Ahmed Alkali representing Gombe North all won on the platform of All Progressives Congress.

== Overview ==
Affiliation	Party		Total
Affiliation	PDP	APC	Total
Before Election	1	2	3
After Election	0	3	3

== Summary ==
District	Incumbent	Party	Elected Senator	Party
Gombe South	Joshua Lidani	APC	Amos Bulus Kilawangs	APC
Gombe Central	Mohammed Danjuma Goje	APC	Mohammed Danjuma Goje	APC
Gombe North	Bayero Usman Nafada	APC	Sa'idu Ahmed Alkali	APC

== Results ==
=== Gombe South ===
A total of 11 candidates registered with the Independent National Electoral Commission to contest in the election. APC candidate Bulus Kilawangs Amos won the election, defeating PDP candidate, Binta Bello and 9 other party candidates. Amos scored 80,549 votes, while PDP candidate Bello scored 63,312 votes.

2019 Nigerian Senate election in Gombe State
Party	Candidate	Votes	%
APC	Bulus Kilawangs Amos	80,549	
PDP	Binta Bello	63,312	
Others			
Total votes		152,278	100%
APC hold			

=== Gombe Central ===
A total of 13 candidates registered with the Independent National Electoral Commission to contest in the election. APC candidate Mohammed Danjuma Goje won the election, defeating PDP candidate Abubakar Nono and 11 other party candidates. Goje pulled 110,116 votes, while PDP candidate Nono scored 39,760.

2019 Nigerian Senate election in Gombe State
Party	Candidate	Votes	%
APC	Mohammed Danjuma Goje	110,116	
PDP	Abubakar Nono	39,760	
Others			
Total votes		160,131	100%
APC hold			

=== Bauchi North ===
A total of 18 candidates registered with the Independent National Electoral Commission to contest in the election. APC candidate Sa'idu Ahmed Alkali won the election, defeating PDP candidate and former Gombe Governor, Ibrahim Dakwambo and 16 other party candidates. Alkali pulled 152,546 votes while his closest rival Dakwambo pulled 88,016 votes.

2019 Nigerian Senate election in Gombe State
Party	Candidate	Votes	%
APC	Sa'idu Ahmed Alkali	152,546	
PDP	Ibrahim Dakwambo	88,016	
Others			
Total votes		246,131	100%
APC hold			
