= 1999 Nigerian Senate elections in Gombe State =

The 1999 Nigerian Senate election in Gombe State was held on February 20, 1999, to elect members of the Nigerian Senate to represent Gombe State. Saidu Kumo representing Gombe Central won on the platform of Peoples Democratic Party, while Umar Usman Dukku representing Gombe North and Idris Abubakar representing Gombe South won on the platform of the All Nigeria Peoples Party.

== Overview ==
Affiliation	Party		Total
Affiliation	PDP	ANPP	Total
Before Election			3
After Election	1	2	3

== Summary ==
District	Incumbent	Party	Elected Senator	Party
Gombe Central			Saidu Kumo	PDP
Gombe South			Idris Abubakar	ANPP
Gombe North			Umar Usman Dukku	ANPP

== Results ==
=== Gombe Central ===
The election was won by Saidu Kumo of the Peoples Democratic Party.

1999 Nigerian Senate election in Gombe State
Party	Candidate	Votes	%
PDP	Saidu Kumo		
Total votes			
PDP hold			

=== Gombe South ===
The election was won by Idris Abubakar of the Peoples Democratic Party.

1999 Nigerian Senate election in Gombe State
Party	Candidate	Votes	%
ANPP	Idris Abubakar		
Total votes			
ANPP hold			

=== Gombe North ===
The election was won by Umar Usman Dukku of the All Nigeria Peoples Party.

1999 Nigerian Senate election in Gombe State
Party	Candidate	Votes	%
ANPP	Umar Usman Dukku		
Total votes			
ANPP hold			

== Replacement ==
Idris Abubakar representing Gombe South, died on the 11th of December 2002 and was replaced by Tawar Umbi Wada of the PDP
