= 2007 Nigerian Senate elections in Gombe State =

2007 Nigerian Senate election in Gombe State

The 2007 Nigerian Senate election in Gombe State was held on April 21, 2007, to elect members of the Nigerian Senate to represent Gombe State. Kawu Peto Dukku representing Gombe North, Tawar Umbi Wada representing Gombe South and Audu Idris Umar representing Gombe Central all won on the platform of the Peoples Democratic Party.

== Overview ==
Affiliation	Party		Total
Affiliation	PDP	AC	Total
Before Election			3
After Election	3	0	3

== Summary ==
District	Incumbent	Party	Elected Senator	Party
Gombe North			Kawu Peto Dukku	PDP
Gombe South			Tawar Umbi Wada	PDP
Gombe Central			Audu Idris Umar	PDP

== Results ==
=== Gombe North ===
The election was won by Kawu Peto Dukku of the Peoples Democratic Party.

2007 Nigerian Senate election in Gombe State
Party	Candidate	Votes	%
PDP	Kawu Peto Dukku		
Total votes			
PDP hold			

=== Gombe South ===
The election was won by Tawar Umbi Wada of the Peoples Democratic Party.

2007 Nigerian Senate election in Gombe State
Party	Candidate	Votes	%
PDP	Tawar Umbi Wada		
Total votes			
PDP hold			

=== Gombe Central ===
The election was won by Audu Idris Umar of the Peoples Democratic Party.

2007 Nigerian Senate election in Gombe State
Party	Candidate	Votes	%
PDP	Audu Idris Umar		
Total votes			
PDP hold			
