= 2015 Nigerian Senate elections in Gombe State =

2015 Nigerian Senate election in Gombe State

The 2015 Nigerian Senate election in Gombe State was held on March 28, 2015, to elect members of the Nigerian Senate to represent Gombe State. Mohammed Danjuma Goje representing Gombe Central and Usman Bayero Nafada representing Gombe North won on the platform of All Progressives Congress, while Joshua Moltobok representing Gombe South won on the platform of Peoples Democratic Party.

== Overview ==
Affiliation	Party		Total
Affiliation	APC	PDP	Total
Before Election			3
After Election	2	1	3

== Summary ==
District	Incumbent	Party	Elected Senator	Party
Gombe Central			Mohammed Danjuma Goje	APC
Gombe North			Usman Bayero Nafada	APC
Gombe South			Joshua Moltobok	PDP

== Results ==
=== Gombe Central ===
All Progressives Congress candidate Mohammed Danjuma Goje won the election, defeating People's Democratic Party candidate Usman Kumo and other party candidates.

2015 Nigerian Senate election in Gombe State
Party	Candidate	Votes	%
APC	Mohammed Danjuma Goje		
PDP	Usman Kumo		
Total votes			
APC hold			

=== Gombe North ===
All Progressives Congress candidate Usman Bayero Nafada won the election, defeating People's Democratic Party candidate Abdulkadir Hamma and other party candidates.

2015 Nigerian Senate election in Gombe State
Party	Candidate	Votes	%
APC	Usman Bayero Nafada		
PDP	Abdulkadir Hamma		
Total votes			
APC hold			

=== Gombe South ===
Peoples Democratic Party candidate Joshua Moltobok won the election, defeating All Progressives Congress candidate Adams Balah and other party candidates.

2015 Nigerian Senate election in Gombe State
Party	Candidate	Votes	%
PDP	Joshua Moltobok		
APC	Adams Balah		
Total votes			
PDP hold			
