= Umar Pate =

Nigerian media historian (born 1964)

Umaru Pate
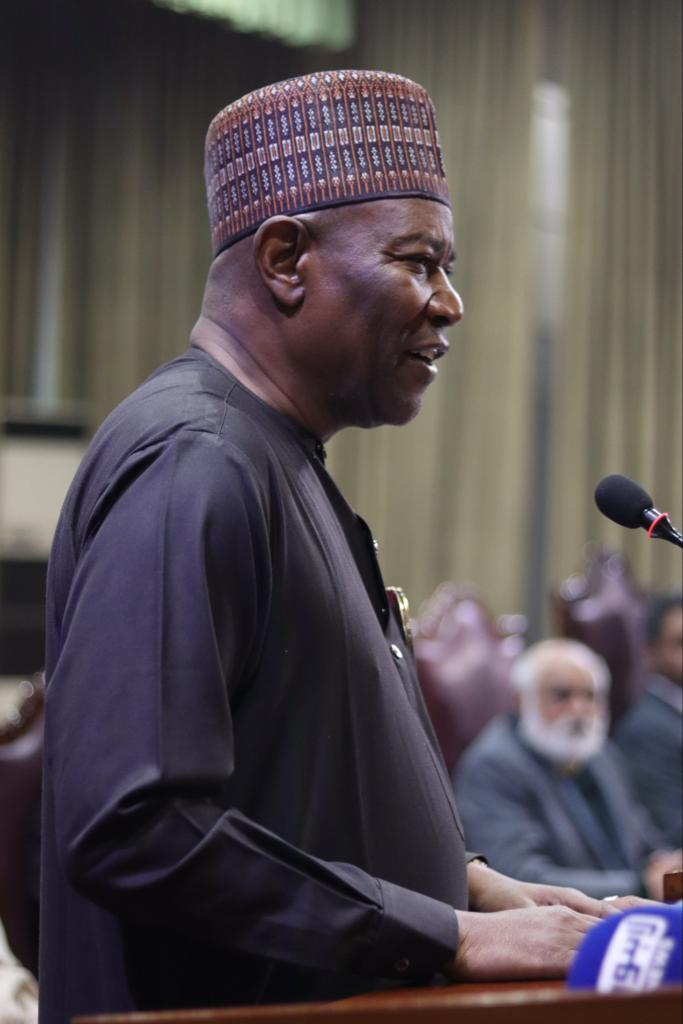
- Born: 4 January 1964 (age 62)
- Education: University of Maiduguri; University of Ghana, Legon
- Successor: Alhassan Mohammed Gani

Umaru Pate (born 1964) is a Nigerian professor of media history and an academic.

He is the Vice Chancellor of Federal University Kashere, Gombe State and the former Dean, School of Postgraduate Studies, Bayero University Kano, the president of Association of Communication Scholars and Professionals of Nigeria (ACSPN), a member of UNESCO Network of Communication Professors.

== Early life and education ==
Umar Pate was born on 4 January 1964 at the District Head's Palace, Song Local Government of Adamawa Emirate, Nigeria. He had his Primary School Leaving Certificate at Nassarao Jeleng LEA Primary School in 1976. He then proceeded to Government College Maiduguri where he emerged as the overall best graduating student of the West African Examinations Council (WAEC), GCE O' Level in Arts department in 1981.

Afterwards, he attended college of preliminary studies, Yola, in 1982 for an Interim Joint Matriculation Board (IJMB) that qualified him for a direct admission into 200 level in 1984. Pate graduated with a degree in Mass communication in 1987 and then bagged Master of Philosophy University of Ghana, Legon and Phd at University of Maiduguri in 1990 and 1997 respectively.

== Career ==
Umar Pate started his career at the department of Mass Communication, University of Maiduguri in 1988, he became an associate professor in 2002. He was appointed a Professor of Mass Communication and Dean, School of Postgraduate Studies, Bayero University Kano in 2007.

On 20 October 2007, Pate became Professor of Media and Society.

== International appointment ==
In November 2017, Pate was appointed by UNESCO in Paris as a director representing Africa on the Six persons Board of Directors of the prestigious International Network of UNESCO Professors in Communication (ORBICOM) that has its headquarters at University of Quebec at Montreal, Canada.

== Recognitions/awards ==
He has served as a consultant for several organization both locally and intentionally such as USAID, UNFPA, UNICEF, UNESCO, World Bank, Ford Foundation etc.

Not neglecting his tradition and culture, professor Pate is also the Kaigama of Adamawa state which translates to the chief of defense of staff and also one of the 11 Kingmakers of the state. He has over 66 national and international publications in different part of the world.

Some of the awards The VC of FUK, Umar Pate got was the "Award of excellence for service to humanity" by the National Association of Women Journalist (NAWOJ).
