= 2007 Gombe State gubernatorial election =

State election in Nigeria

- 14 April 2007
Nominee	Mohammed Danjuma Goje	Abubakar Habu Hashidu
Party	PDP	DPP
Popular vote	985,013	38,303
Governor before election
Mohammed Danjuma Goje
PDP
Elected Governor
Mohammed Danjuma Goje
PDP

The 2007 Gombe State gubernatorial election was the 3rd gubernatorial election of Gombe State. Held on 14 April 2007, the People's Democratic Party nominee Mohammed Danjuma Goje won the election, defeating Abubakar Habu Hashidu of the Democratic People's Party.

== Results ==
Mohammed Danjuma Goje from the People's Democratic Party won the election, defeating Abubakar Habu Hashidu from the Democratic People's Party. Registered voters was 1,410,234.

2007 Gombe State gubernatorial election
Party	Candidate	Votes	%	±%
PDP	Mohammed Danjuma Goje	985,013	0	
DPP	Abubakar Habu Hashidu	38,303	0	
PDP hold				
