= 1999 Gombe State gubernatorial election =

1999 gubernatorial election in Gombe State, Nigeria

- January 9, 1999
Nominee	Abubakar Habu Hashidu
Party	All People's Party (Nigeria)	PDP
Running mate	Joshua M. Lidani
Popular vote	349,284	267,043
Elected Governor
Abubakar Habu Hashidu
All People's Party (Nigeria)

The 1999 Gombe State gubernatorial election occurred in Nigeria on January 9, 1999. The APP nominee Abubakar Habu Hashidu won the election, defeating the PDP candidate.

Abubakar Habu Hashidu emerged APP candidate.

== Electoral system ==
The Governor of Gombe State is elected using the plurality voting system.

== Primary election ==
=== APP primary ===
The APP primary election was won by Abubakar Habu Hashidu.

== Results ==
The total number of registered voters in the state was 1,113,734. Total number of votes cast was 644,696, while number of valid votes was 622,379. Rejected votes were 22,317.

Candidate	Party	Votes	%
Abubakar Habu Hashidu	All People's Party	349,284	56.67
People's Democratic Party	267,043	43.33	
Total		616,327	100.00
Valid votes		616,327	96.51
Invalid/blank votes		22,317	3.49
Total votes		638,644	100.00
Registered voters/turnout		1,113,734	57.34
Source: Nigeria World, IFES, Semantics Scholar
