= 2003 Nigerian Senate elections in Gombe State =

2003 Nigerian Senate election in Gombe State

The 2003 Nigerian Senate election in Gombe State was held on April 12, 2003, to elect members of the Nigerian Senate to represent Gombe State. Abubakar Mohammed representing Gombe Central and Tawar Umbi Wada representing Gombe South won on the platform of Peoples Democratic Party, while Haruna Garba representing Gombe North won on the platform of the All Nigeria Peoples Party.

== Overview ==
Affiliation	Party		Total
Affiliation	PDP	ANPP	Total
Before Election			3
After Election	2	1	3

== Summary ==
District	Incumbent	Party	Elected Senator	Party
Gombe Central			Abubakar Mohammed	PDP
Gombe South			Tawar Umbi Wada	PDP
Gombe North			Haruna Garba	ANPP

== Results ==
=== Gombe Central ===
The election was won by Abubakar Mohammed of the Peoples Democratic Party.

2003 Nigerian Senate election in Gombe State
Party	Candidate	Votes	%
PDP	Abubakar Mohammed		
Total votes			
PDP hold			

=== Gombe South ===
The election was won by Tawar Umbi Wada of the Peoples Democratic Party.

2003 Nigerian Senate election in Gombe State
Party	Candidate	Votes	%
PDP	Tawar Umbi Wada		
Total votes			
PDP hold			

=== Gombe North ===
The election was won by Haruna Garba of the All Nigeria Peoples Party.

2003 Nigerian Senate election in Gombe State
Party	Candidate	Votes	%
ANPP	Haruna Garba		
Total votes			
ANPP hold			
