= 2011 Nigerian Senate elections in Gombe State =

2011 Nigerian Senate election in Gombe State

The 2011 Nigerian Senate election in Gombe State was held on April 9, 2011, to elect members of the Nigerian Senate to represent Gombe State. Mohammed Danjuma Goje representing Gombe Central, Joshua Zidani representing Gombe South and Sa'idu Ahmed Alkali representing Gombe North all won on the platform of Peoples Democratic Party.

== Overview ==
| Affiliation | Party | | Total |
| Affiliation | PDP | ACN | Total |
|---|---|---|---|
| Before Election | | | 3 |
| After Election | 3 | – | 3 |

== Summary ==
| District | Incumbent | Party | Elected Senator | Party |
|---|---|---|---|---|
| Gombe Central | | | Mohammed Danjuma Goje | PDP |
| Gombe South | | | Joshua Zidani | PDP |
| Gombe North | | | Sa'idu Ahmed Alkali | PDP |

== Results ==
=== Gombe Central ===
Peoples Democratic Party candidate Mohammed Danjuma Goje won the election, defeating other party candidates.

2011 Nigerian Senate election in Gombe State
| Party | Candidate | Votes | % |
|---|---|---|---|
| PDP | Mohammed Danjuma Goje | | |
| Total votes | | | |
| PDP hold | | | |

=== Gombe South ===
Peoples Democratic Party candidate Joshua Zidani won the election, defeating other party candidates.

2011 Nigerian Senate election in Gombe State
| Party | Candidate | Votes | % |
|---|---|---|---|
| PDP | Joshua Zidani | | |
| Total votes | | | |
| PDP hold | | | |

=== Gombe North ===
Peoples Democratic Party candidate Sa'idu Ahmed Alkali won the election, defeating party candidates.

2011 Nigerian Senate election in Gombe State
| Party | Candidate | Votes | % |
|---|---|---|---|
| PDP | Sa'idu Ahmed Alkali | | |
| Total votes | | | |
| PDP hold | | | |
