= 2003 Gombe State gubernatorial election =

2003 gubernatorial election in Gombe State, Nigeria

- April 19, 2003
Nominee	Mohammed Danjuma Goje	Abubakar Habu Hashidu
Party	PDP	ANPP
Running mate	Lazarus John Yoriyo	Joshua Lidani
Popular vote	495,562	468,223
Governor before election
Abubakar Habu Hashidu
ANPP
Elected Governor
Mohammed Danjuma Goje
PDP

The 2003 Gombe State gubernatorial election occurred in Nigeria on April 19, 2003. The PDP nominee Mohammed Danjuma Goje won the election, defeating Abubakar Habu Hashidu of the ANPP.

Mohammed Danjuma Goje emerged PDP candidate. He picked Lazarus John Yoriyo as his running mate. Abubakar Habu Hashidu was the ANPP candidate with Joshua Lidani as his running mate.

== Electoral system ==
The Governor of Gombe State is elected using the plurality voting system.

== Primary election ==
=== PDP primary ===
The PDP primary election was won by Mohammed Danjuma Goje. He picked Lazarus John Yoriyo as his running mate.

=== ANPP primary ===
The ANPP primary election was won by Abubakar Habu Hashidu. He picked Joshua Lidani as his running mate.

== Results ==
A total number of 6 candidates registered with the Independent National Electoral Commission to contest in the election.

The total number of registered voters in the state was 1,263,287.

Candidate	Party	Votes	%
Mohammed Danjuma Goje	People's Democratic Party	495,562	51.42
Abubakar Habu Hashidu	All Nigeria Peoples Party	468,223	48.58
Total		963,785	100.00
Registered voters/turnout		1,263,287	–
Source: CCSU
