= Ibrahim Dasuki Jalo-Waziri =

Nigerian politician

National Youth Leader, All Progressives Congress
- Incumbent
- Assumed office June 2014

Chairman, Gombe Local Government
- In office 2004–2010

Personal details
- Born: April 13, 1971 (age 55) Maiduguri, Borno State, Nigeria
- Party: APC

Ibrahim Dasuki Jalo-Waziri (born April 13, 1971) was the National Youth Leader of the All Progressives Congress (APC), Nigeria's ruling party. With a political career spanning 12 years, Ibrahim has both occupied elected offices and political appointments.

== Early life and education ==
Ibrahim was born in Maiduguri on 13 April 1971, to Senator Ibrahim Jalo-Waziri and Hajiya Adama Modibbo. His father was Speaker of the House of Representatives from 1960 to 1966, and served as a senator between 1979 and 1983.

An indigene of Gombe Local Government in Gombe State, Ibrahim's education began in 1978 at the Tudun Wada Primary School, Gombe. In 1983, he proceeded to the Government Science Secondary School (also in Gombe), where he earned his SSCE certificate in 1988. In 1989, he enrolled in the Federal College of Education, Gombe, and collected an NCE degree in Business Education in 1993. Studying further, between 1995 and 2000, he was a student at the Ahmadu Bello University, from where he earned a bachelor's degree in Business Education. In 2005, he secured an MBA (Financial Management) from the Abubakar Tafawa Balewa University, Bauchi.

== Career ==
Upon graduation from Ahmadu Bello University in 2000, Ibrahim participated in the mandatory National Youth Service Corps (2000–2001), during which the Central Insurance Company (CICO), Jos, was his designated place of primary assignment. In 2003, Ibrahim was appointed Secretary of the State Independent Electoral Commission, Gombe. He also got a political appointment as a Special Adviser to the then Governor of Gombe State, Danjuma Goje, in the same year.

In 2004, he threw his hat in the ring for the chairmanship of Gombe Local Government - an election which he won – and occupied this position until 2007. In 2007, the executive bodies of local governments was dissolved; yet, he emerged as the caretaker chairman and in 2008, he was officially re-elected as the executive chairman of Gombe Local Government Area. During his second tenure, Ibrahim was elected National President of the Association of Local Governments of Nigeria (ALGON), a body encompassing all chairmen of the 774 Local Government Areas across Nigeria.

In 2011, he contested to represent the Gombe/Kwami/Funakaye Federal Constituency at the Federal House of Representatives, but lost. In 2014, he emerged as the National Youth Leader of the All Progressives Congress.

== Tenure as APC Youth Leader ==
Ibrahim's emergence as the APC National Youth Leader was marked with controversy, as stories allegedly sponsored by the ruling Peoples Democratic Party (PDP) cast doubt on his age. This was, however, settled swiftly by the APC and youth groups within the party rallied round him to lend their support.

As youth leader of the APC, Ibrahim has been able to harmonize the APC youth structure by creating an effective working relationship between youth leaders as contained within the official party structure, and affiliated youth groups with the mandate of mobilizing young Nigerians for the party.

== See also ==
- All Progressives Congress
- John Odigie Oyegun
- Mohammed Danjuma Goje
