= Federal University Kashere =

University in Nigeria

Federal University of Kashere
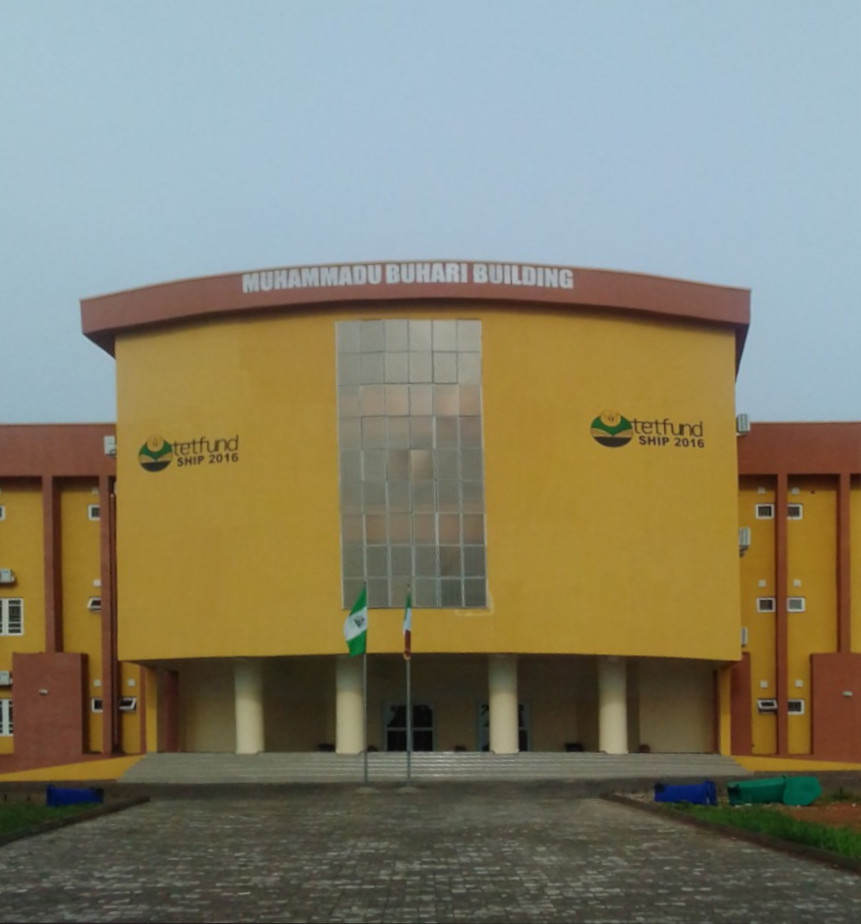
- Other name: FUK
- Motto: Doctrina Mater Artium
- Motto in English: Education for Global Citizenship
- Type: Public
- Established: 2011
- Founder: Goodluck Jonathan
- Accreditation: National Universities Commission
- Visitor: Bola Ahmed Tinubu
- Vice-Chancellor: Prof. Umaru A. Pate
- Location: Kashere, Gombe State, Nigeria
- Language: English language
- Colors: Green and Maroon
- Website: fukashere.edu.ng

The Federal University of Kashere, also known as FUKashere, is a public conventional university situated in the North Eastern part of Nigeria. The recently established university is situated in the small city of Kashere, an administrative territory of Pindiga, Akko local government in Gombe State, Nigeria. It was established in 2010 by the Goodluck Jonathan administration as one of the nine new federal universities created in the six geo-political zones of Nigeria. The university was established in a bid to increase access to education and also to ensure equity among all the States in Nigeria.

== Faculties/schools ==
The university is recently running 6 faculties and 2 schools which are listed below

- Faculty of Agriculture
- Faculty of Education
- Faculty of Humanities
- Faculty of Sciences
- Faculty of Management Sciences
- Faculty of Social Sciences
- School of Postgraduate Studies
- School of Preliminary and General studies
- College of Medical Sciences (Proposed)

=== Approval of MSc, PhD in Mass communication ===
The National Universities Commission (NUC) has approved the commencement of full time MSc, phD in mass communication program for post graduate students in Federal University of Kashere on 14 June 2023.

== Vice chancellor ==
The current vice-chancellor is Prof. Umaru A. Pate. He succeeded Prof. Alhassan Muhammed Gani, whose single term tenure of five years expired on February 10, 2021

- Professor Umaru A. Pate, 2021 - to date
- Professor Muhammad Alhassan Gani, 2016 - 2020
- Professor Mohammed Kabiru Faruk, 2011 - 2015

=== Registrar ===
The former registrar of the school Alhaji Kabiru Garba Aminu handed over to the new Acting Registrar Mallam Umar Faruq Bayu who was appointed in August 2022.

== Library ==
The Federal University Kashere Library is a two–storey building, located at a central position making it accessible to the entire university. The library fully started operation in 2012. It has five divisions: Technical Service Division, Reader Service Division, System and Multimedia Division, Reference and Information Services Division, and Serials Management.

== Ranking ==
According to webometrics, the Federal University of Kashere Ranking is analysed below;

World Ranking	Continental Ranking	Country Ranking	Impact	Openness	Excellence
6911	177	56	6841	4325	7190
