= Danladi Sanusi-Maiyamba =

16th Mai Tangale of the Tangale chiefdom

Mai Tangale

Personal details
- Born: February 12, 1966 (age 60)

Malam Danladi Sanusi-Maiyamba is the 16th Mai Tangale of the Tangale chiefdom. He ascended to the throne 52 days after the death of Dr. Abdu Buba Maisheru II, the 15th Mai Tangale. He was appointed by the governor of Gombe State in reference to Gombe Chieftaincy law and in consultation with the lawmakers

== Early life and education ==
Malam Danladi Sanusi Maiyamba was born on February 12, 1966, in Billiri Local Government Area of Gombe State. He went to Billiri Primary School where he obtained his Primary School Leaving Certificate. After that, he proceeded to Government Day Secondary School, Army Barrack in Yola where he obtained Secondary School Certificate in 1984. He did his tertiary education at Federal Polytechnic Bauchi where he bagged a degree in Public Administration.

== Career ==
Danladi Sanusi-Maiyamba was a civil servant who worked in many government sectors. He worked at the Ministry of Education, Bauchi from 1987 to 1996.

He was at Shari’a Court of Appeal, Gombe between 2005 and 2011 and he left for a position at Local Government Service Commission from 2011 to 2016. In 2016, he left Local Government to assume a position at Ministry of Animal Husbandry and Nomadic Affairs which lasted till 2018. In the same year, he got an appointment with the Gombe State House of Assembly Service Commission which lasted till the day he ascended the throne.
