= Billiri =

- Town and LGA and town
- Motto: Kal Kwi ka Amdo
- Interactive map of Billiri
- Location in Nigeria
- Coordinates: 9°50′N 11°09′E
- Country: Nigeria
- State: Gombe State

Government
  - Type: Council government
  - Local Government Chairman and the Head of the Local Government Council: Egla Idris

Area
  - Total: 737 km^{2} (285 sq mi)

Population (2022 Projection: Source:https://citypopulation.de/en/nigeria/admin/gombe/NGA016003__billiri/)
  - Total: 339 400
  - Density: 0.460/km^{2} (1.19/sq mi)
  - Religions: Islam and Christianity
- Time zone: UTC+1 (WAT)
- 3-digit postal code prefix: 771
- ISO 3166 code: NG.GO.BI

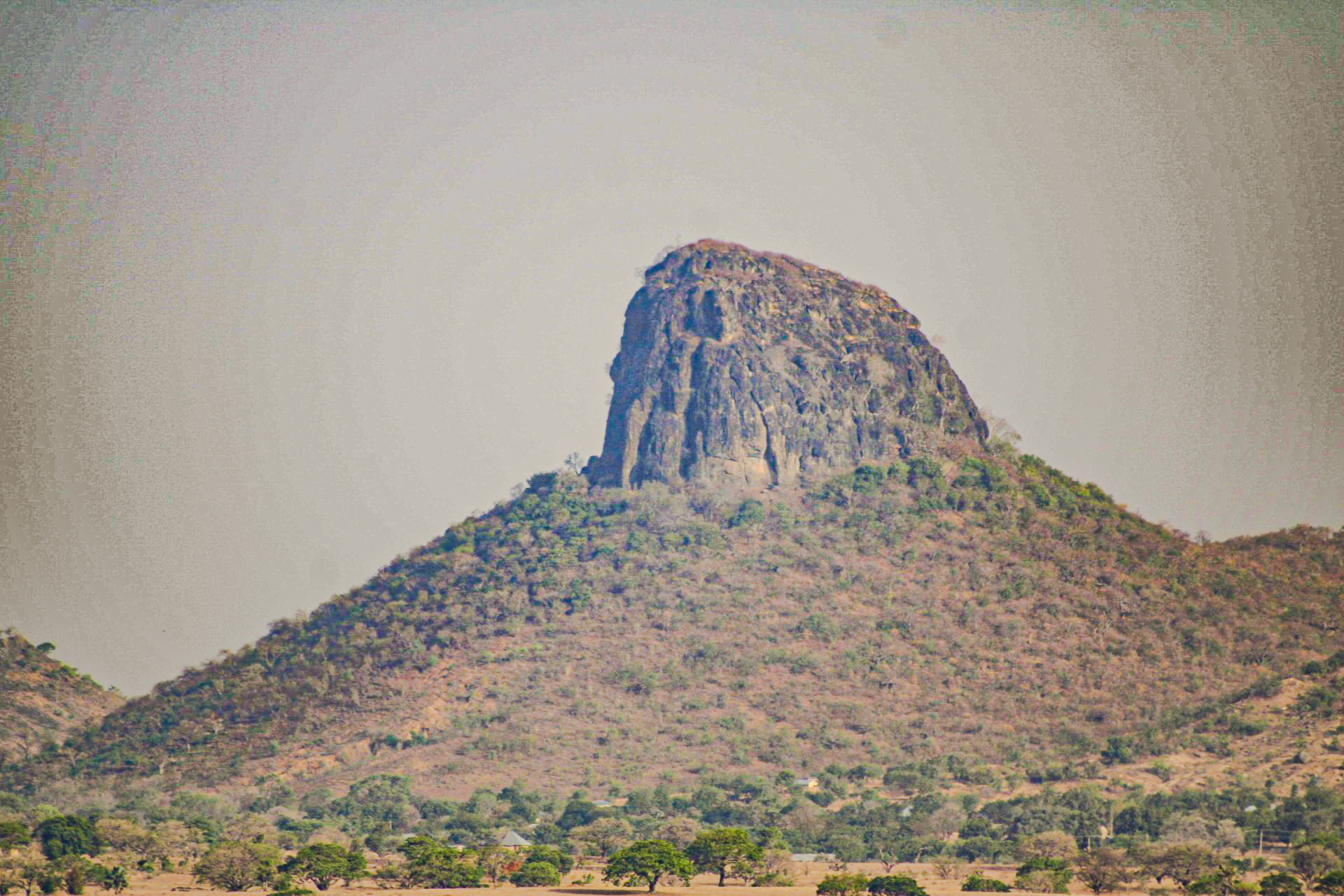
Billiri hill located in Billiri local government Area

Billiri, also known as Tangle, is a town and one of the 11 Local Government Areas of Gombe State, Nigeria located south of Gombe. It is bordered to the north by Akko Local Government Area, south and east by Shongom, and northeast by Kaltungo Local Government Area. It is historically and presently a major settlement of the Tangale people who make up the dominant majority of its inhabitant. It has an area of 737km^{2} and a population of 202,144 as at the 2006 census. The Tangale language is the native language of the people and is widely spoken. Like other places in northern Nigeria, Hausa language is a common language as well The postal code of the area is 771.

== History ==
The Tangale people claimed to have emerged as the settlers of Billiri from a migration journey through Borno State.They had to move from places such as Sanum kede and Kupto due to tribal wars. Tangaltong, one of the 7 clans in Tangale is where billiri as well as Bare and Kantali resided. The Tangale language is a west chadic language.

== Mai Tangle ==
The traditional ruler of the Tangale west people of Billiri is addressed as Mai Tangle. The traditional stool is presently occupied by Mallam Danladi Maiyamba who ascended following the death of Mai Abdu Maishero. His ascension was shrouded in controversies as it was deemed by the people of the chiefdom as an imposition by the state governor, the series of protest that followed became violent causing destruction of properties.

== The Billiri Crisis ==
In March 2021, Danladi Sanusi-Maiyamba was announced by the Gombe State governor as the new Mai Tangle following the death of Mai Abdu Buba Maisharu II, the immediate past Mai of Tangale Kingdom who died in January 2021. The announcement erupted violent protests in Billiri over the claim that Mohammad Inuwa Yahaya, the Governor of the State, did not go with the candidate elected by the kingmakers. The erupted concerns and protests led to violence that claimed lives and properties.

== Towns & Villages ==
The towns and villages in Billiri Local Government Area include:

1. Billiri-Tangale
2. Ayaba
3. Baganje
4. Bare
5. Billiri
6. Kalmai
7. Kulkul
8. Labepit
9. Lakalkal
10. Lamugu
11. Landongor
12. Pokuli
13. Lanshi daji
14. Popandi
15. Sabon layi
16. Sansani (Lakumana)
17. Pandinkude
18. Pandi kamio
19. Pokwangli
20. Shela
21. Sikirit
22. Tal
23. Tanglang
24. Todi
25. Tudu kwaya

== Wards/Polling units ==
There are 10 wards in Billiri local government and they are:

1. Bangaje North
2. Bangaje South
3. Bare
4. Billiri North
5. Billiri South
6. Kalmai
7. Todi
8. Tudu Kwaya
9. Tal
10. Tanglang

== Religion ==
A majority of the inhabitants of Billiri are Christian, with a minority of its population Muslim and Traditional Worshippers. Christmas and Easter are major annual religious holidays that are characterized by wide celebrations and vibrant rallies. The Islamic Eid (sallah) also calls for holidays and vibrant celebrations as well.

== Schools ==
They include:

- ECWA Secondary School Billiri
- Sambo Memorial Secondary School
- Central Primary School
- Paulo Academy Billiri
- Pajuma Academy Kentengereng Billiri
- Government Day Secondary School Amtawlam
- Federal Government College Billiri (FGC)
- Government Sciences Secondary School Billiri
- College of Education Billiri

== Food ==
Soya beans is one of the common foods in Billiri with about six prominent markets according to a study

== Festivals ==
- One of the major festival in the Tangale land is the "Pishi Tangle Day": The Pishi Tangle bring together all the Tangle people in Gombe state and around the world to celebrate culture, heritage, and promote the peaceful co-existence of the Tangale people regardless of their difference, in the interest of the Tangale land and cultural heritage.
- Bai "Dog meat" Festival

== Market ==
Billiri market is on Saturday of every week, and it is recognized for the selling of agricultural products like cowpea, soya beans, beans, and other household items. The Biliri market is primarily regarded as a large market for diverse trading.

== Climate ==
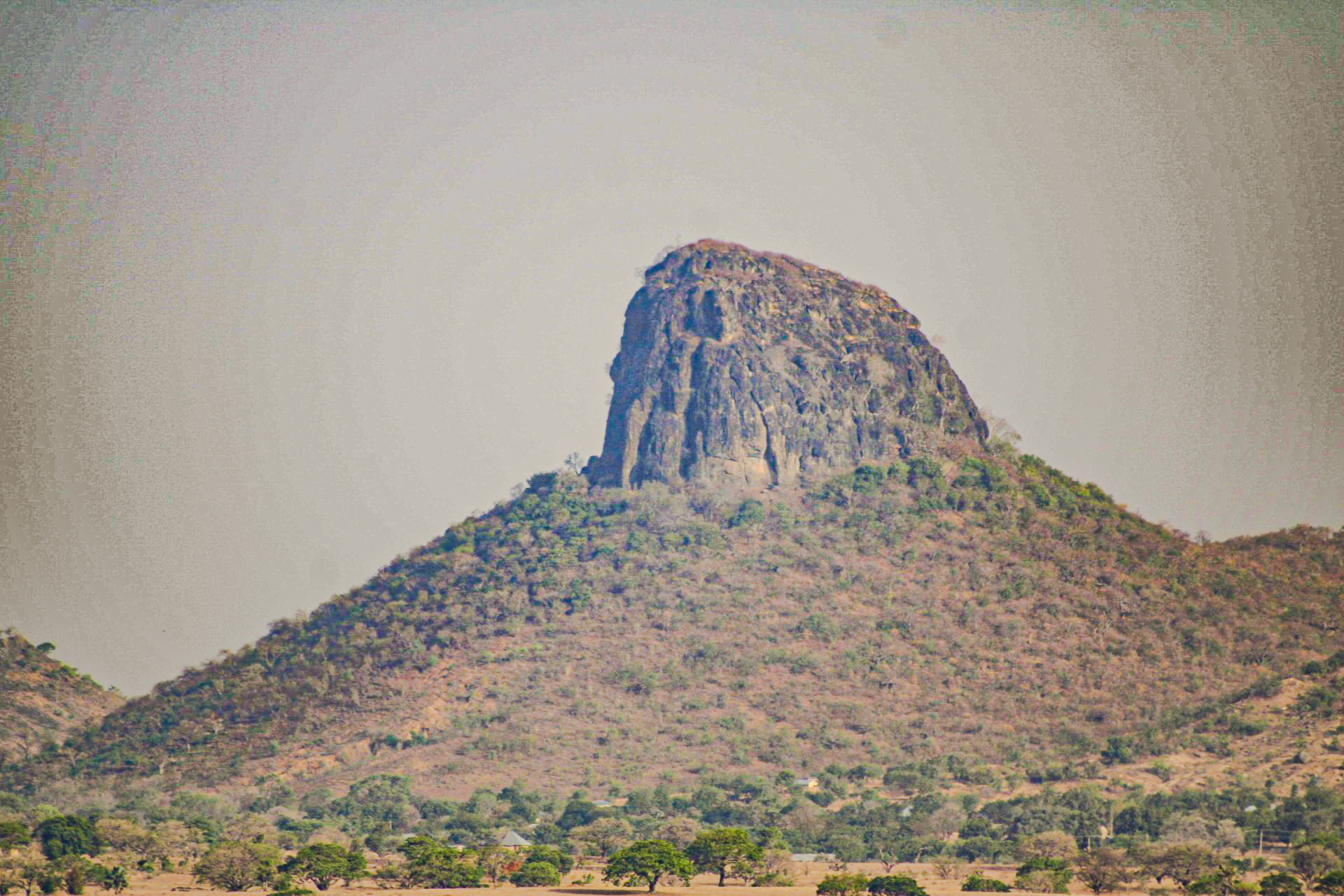
Mai Tangle Hill (Pandi Tangle)

The Billiri local government area in Gombe has the wet season is oppressive and overcast, the dry season is partly cloudy, and it is hot year round. Over the course of the year, the temperature typically varies from 56 °F to 98 °F and is rarely below 52 °F or above 103 °F

=== Temperatures in Billiri on average, both high and low ===
- With an average daily high temperature of 95 °F, the hot season lasts for 2.3 months, from 11 February to 21 April. With an average high of 95 °F and low of 73 °F, April is the hottest month of the year in Billiri.
- From 2 July to 14 October, the cool season, which has an average daily high temperature below 84 °F, lasts for 3.4 months. With an average low of 57 °F and a high of 88 °F, December is the coldest month of the year in Billiri.

=== The Billiri Cloud ===
Over the course of the year, there is a substantial seasonal change in the average percentage of sky that is covered by clouds in Billiri.

In Billiri, the clearer season starts about 5 November and lasts for 4.0 months, finishing around 5 March.

In Billiri, January is the clearest month of the year, with a 55% average percentage of clear, mostly clear, or partly overcast skies.

Around 5 March, the year's cloudier period starts, and it lasts for 8.0 months, ending around 5 November.

May is the cloudiest month of the year in Billiri, with 79% of the time experiencing overcast or mostly cloudy skies on average.
