= Binta Bello =

Nigerian politician

Fatima Binta Bello

Deputy Minority Whip
- Incumbent
- Assumed office 29 May 2015
- President: Muhammadu Buhari
- Leader: Yakubu Dogara
- Preceded by: Adamu Gora Kalba
- Constituency: Kaltungo/Shongom Federal Constituency

Representative for Kaltungo/Shongom
- Incumbent
- Assumed office 2011

Personal details
- Born: 1970 (age 55–56) Igbuzo, Delta State
- Party: People's Democratic Party (Nigeria)
- Spouse: usman Mustapha Bello
- Children: 2
- Education: University of Maiduguri
- Occupation: Politician
- Profession: Civil servant, politician

Binta Bello was a former class teacher, state commissioner, and current Deputy Minority Whip in the Nigerian House of Representatives. Bello represents the Kaltungo/Shongom Federal Constituency of Gombe State. She is the only woman in the leadership of the House.

== Early life and education ==
Bello was born in Igbuzo, Delta State to a military officer father. She moved all around the country before finally returning to her native Gombe State.

She obtained a grade II certificate from W.T.C Bajoga, Gombe state in 1988, a Diploma in Public Administration from the University of Jos in 1995, and a B.Sc. in Public Administration from the University of Maiduguri in 2010.

== Career ==
Bello worked as a Commissioner for Women Affairs in Gombe State from 2007 to 2010. She then contested as a Representative for the Kaltungo/Shongom Federal Constituency on the platform of the PDP which she won. The other PDP women elected were Nnenna Elendu-Ukeje, Sodaguno Festus Omoni, Nkiruka Chidubem Onyejeocha, Rita Orji, Evelyn Omavovoan Oboro, Beni Butmaklar Langtang, Omosede Igbinedion Gabriella, Stella Obiageli Ngwu and Eucharia Okwunna.

In 2019 she lost the election to the All Progressives congress

(APC). Amos Bulus APC party having 80,549 and People Democratic Party (PDP) having 63,312.
