= Eucharia Okwunna =

Nigerian politician (born 1961)

- Born: 3 November 1961 (age 64); Aguata, Anambra State, Nigeria
- Occupation: Politician
- Known for: Member of the Nigerian House of Representatives
- Political party: People's Democratic Party
- Children: 4

Eucharia Azodo Okwunna (born 3 November 1961) is a Nigerian politician. She was a member of the People's Democratic Party and the House of Representatives. In 2015, she was one of 21 female Nigerian senators.

== Life and career ==
Okwunna was born on 3 November 1961 in Aguata, Anambra State, Nigeria. She was elected in 2003 and then reelected in 2007 to the Anambra State House of Assembly, where she took on the position of Speaker. She was the first woman to hold that elected position.

Okwunna was voted in as the People's Democratic Party candidate to the House of Representatives in 2011. In 2015, she was one of fifteen female members and one of ten from the People's Democratic Party to join the 8th National Assembly, where she represented Aguata. The other PDP women were Nnenna Elendu Ukeje, Sodaguno Festus Omoni, Nkeiruka Onyejeocha, Rita Orji, Evelyn Omavovoan Oboro, Beni Butmaklar Langtang, Omosede Igbinedion Gabriella, Stella Obiageli Ngwu, and Fatima Binta Bello.

Okwunna was in the lower house for eight years before deciding to run for the senate in 2018, to represent Anambra South. She was a senator for the PDP party in 2019 and one of 21 women in the Nigerian senate.

=== Personal life ===
Okwunna is married to Betrand Azodo. They have four adult children, and she is a grandmother.
