= Killang Hill =

Nigerian Tourist Center

Killang Hill is a hill in the Northeastern part of Nigeria. It is located in Popandi village in Kaltungo, Gombe State. The site is used for farming, hunting, and tourism.

== Description ==
Gombe is one of those locations and tourism centers where you will like and want to go hiking and enjoy yourself. People visit this location because of heritage and tourism including the Killang Hill, which is almost 1000 feet above sea level, located in Popandi village, Kaltungo, in the northeast part of Nigeria.
