= Tangale language =

West Chadic language spoken in Nigeria

Tangale
- Native to: Nigeria
- Ethnicity: Tangale people
- Native speakers: 200,000 (2006 census)
- Language family: Afro-Asiatic: Chadic; West Chadic; Bole–Angas; Bole–Tangale (A.2); Tangale (South); Tangale

Language codes
- ISO 639-3: tan
- Glottolog: nucl1696
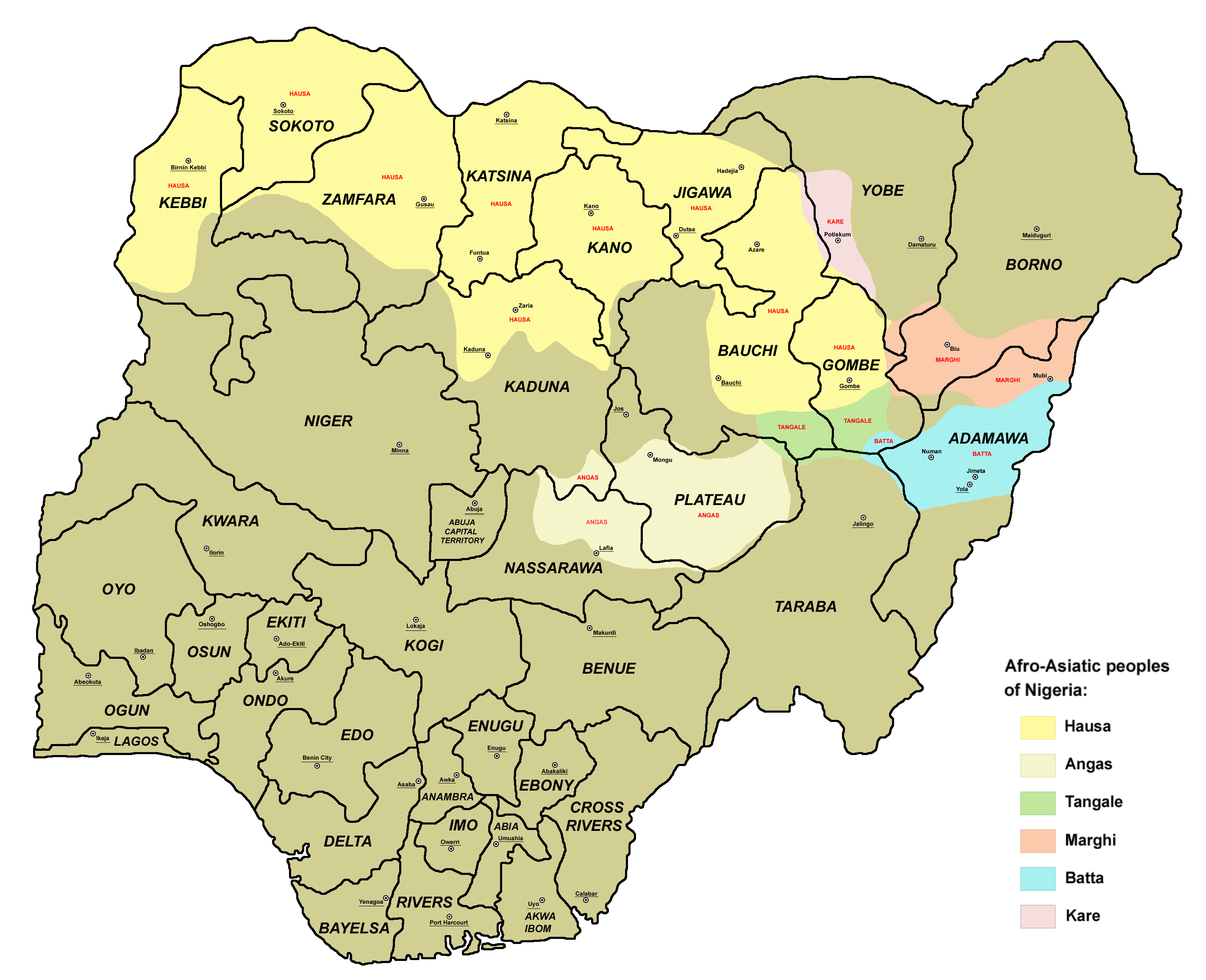
- Ethnic territories of the Tangale-speaking people in Nigeria in green

Tangale (Tangle) is a West Chadic language spoken in Northern region of Nigeria. The vast majority of the native speakers are found across Akko, Billiri, Kaltungo and Shongom Local Government Area of Gombe State Nigeria.

== Phonology ==
There are nine Tangale vowels. Each occurs in a contrastive long and short form.

Tangale vowels
	Front		Back	
	close	open		close
High	i	ɪ	ʊ	u
Mid	e	ɛ	ɔ	o
Low		a		

There are up to 34 consonant phonemes in the language, including implosive stops, prenasalized stops, and labialized consonants. The language uses two levels of contrastive tone.

A prominent feature of Tangale is vowel harmony. Suffixes control whether all the vowels in a word are open or close.

== Grammar ==
=== Nouns ===
Nouns have a masculine or feminine gender, but this is not marked on the noun. The difference in gender is only seen in the agreement system (covert gender). Nouns are not marked for plural, except for the word "child" which has an irregular plural form. A suffix -i marks definite nouns. Nouns can also take a possessive suffix, which indexes the possessor of the noun (possessor agreement).

=== Verbs ===
Verbs are bound roots of the following segmental shapes: CVC-, CVːC-, CV(m)CC-, and CVCː-. Verb roots can be marked for verbal plurality in nine different ways including reduplication, suffixation, infixation and devoicing. A subclass of about 30 verbs have shorter roots with only one consonant.

Verbs stems are marked with one of nine tense-aspect-mood (TAM) suffixes:

1. Imperative-Subjunctive
2. Aorist-Intentional
3. Aorist-Subjunctive
4. Progressive I
5. Future
6. Perfect I
7. Perfect II (Dependent or Repetitive Perfect)
8. Progressive II
9. Habitual

In addition, verbs in some TAM can take an Altrilocal-Ventive or Distance suffix.

=== Ideophones ===
Ideophones are an "emotional-expressive" word class. Morphologically, ideophones are typically disyllabic and have a word-final coda. They also have an alternate form derived by total reduplication. Ideophones only carry low tone.

=== Pronouns ===
The pronominal systems distinguishes 8 categories: three persons, singular & plural, and a gender distinction in second and third person singular forms. There are three types of independent (or absolute) pronouns. Subject pronouns also have three forms which are distinguished by their use in different TAMs. Object and indirect object pronominals are suffixed to the verb. The possessive suffix (or possessor agreement suffix) attaches to nouns and indexes the possessor following the same categories as other pronominals. A reflexive pronoun is formed by the word kɪɪ with a possessive suffix.

=== Negation ===
Nominal and verbal predicates are negated by what is described as a suffix -m.

== Literature ==
J.S.Hall of the Sudan Interior Mission worked with the Tangale people and created literature in the language. In 1920 the Gospel of Luke was published by the British and Foreign Bible Society followed by Ruth and Jonah in 1922, then Acts in 1922, the Gospel of Matthew in 1927, Romans in 1928, the epistles of Paul in 1929 and then the New Testament in 1932.
