= Kashere =

- Town and ward
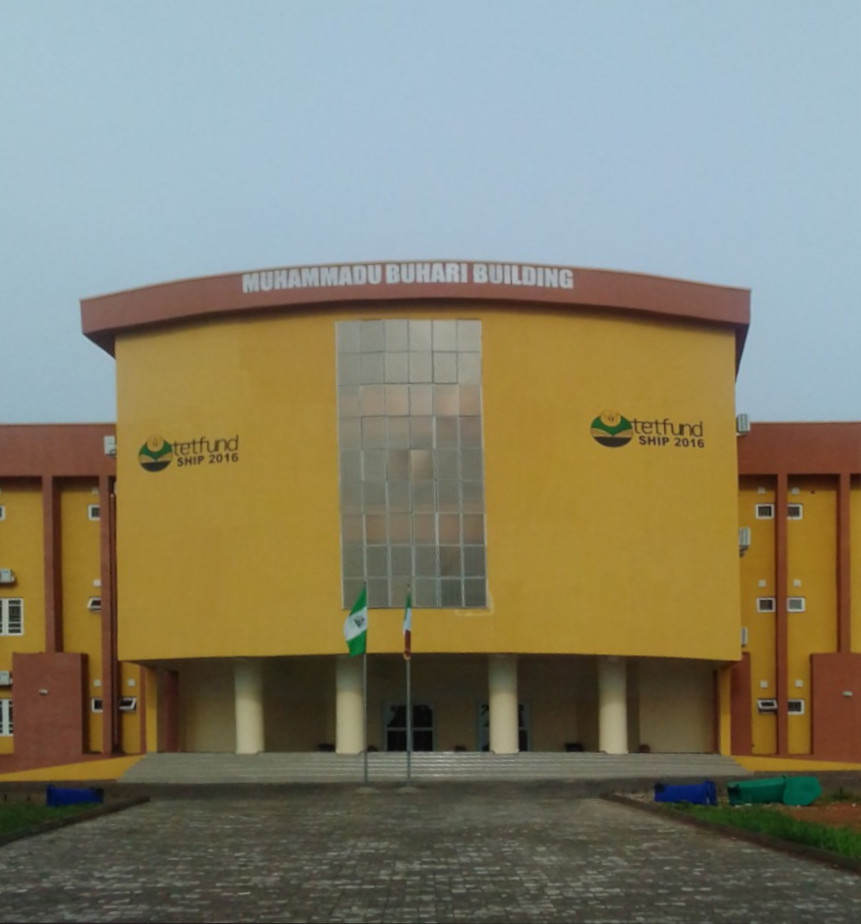
- Federal University of Kashere

- Location in Nigeria
- Coordinates: 9°54′32.545″N 11°00′38.394″E
- Country: Nigeria
- State: Gombe State
- LGA: Akko

Government
  - Type: Democratic

Area
  - Total: 66.2 km^{2} (25.6 sq mi)

Population (2006 census)
  - Ethnicities: Fulani
  - Religions: mostly populated are Muslims and some few Christians
- Time zone: UTC1 (WAT)

Kashere is a town and electoral ward located in Gombe State, Nigeria's Akko Local Government Area. About 46 kilometers, or 28 miles, from Kumo. The distance is roughly 397 kilometers / 247 mi from Kashere to Abuja, the capital of Nigeria.

The postcode of the area is 771103.

== Climate ==
The rainy season in Kashere is oppressive and cloudy, the dry season is partly cloudy, and it's hot all year round. The average annual temperature ranges from 73 °F to 70 °F degrees Fahrenheit with very little variation below or above 103 °F.

== Education ==
- Federal University Of Kashere
- Government Day Comprehensive Secondary School Kashere
- Jibwis islamic science secondary school Kashere
