= Kawu Peto Dukku =

Nigerian politician

Senator of the Federal Republic of Nigeria from Gombe State North District
- In office 29 May 2007 – 2 April 2010
- Preceded by: Tawar Umbi Wada
- Succeeded by: Sa'idu Ahmed Alkali

Speaker, Gombe State House of Assembly
- In office 2003–2007

Personal details
- Born: 14 January 1958 Gombe State, Nigeria
- Died: 2 April 2010 (aged 52)

Kawu Peto Dukku (14 January 1958 – 2 April 2010) was elected Senator for the Gombe North constituency of Gombe State, Nigeria, taking office on 29 May 2007. He was a member of the People's Democratic Party (PDP).

== Early life and education ==
Dukku was born on 14 January 1958 and gained a Higher National Diploma in Business Administration.

== Career and politics ==
He began his working career as a teacher. Later he joined the Goal Star Oil Company in Maiduguri. He was elected to the Gombe State House of Assembly in 1999 and was reelected in 2003, when he was made speaker.

After being elected to the Senate in 2007, Dukku was appointed deputy Chairman of the Senate committee on States and local governments. He was also appointed a member of the Senate Committees on Aviation and Sports. In a mid-term evaluation of Senators in May 2009, ThisDay noted that he had not sponsor any bills, but co-sponsored seven motions, contributed to debates in plenary and was active in committee work. Another source described him as largely a quiet senator who rarely spoke at Senate plenary.

== Death ==
Dukku died in Kaduna after a brief illness on 2 April 2010. He was survived by six children, three wives and an aged mother.
