= Saidu Kumo =

Nigerian politician (1959–2020)

Saidu Umar Kumo

Senator of the Federal Republic of Nigeria from Gombe State Central District
- In office May 1999 – May 2003
- Succeeded by: Abubakar Mohammed

Personal details
- Born: 5 November 1959 Gombe State, Nigeria
- Died: 27 December 2020 (aged 61)
- Party: All Nigeria People's Party

Saidu Umar Kumo (5 November 1959 – 27 December 2020) was a Nigerian politician who was elected Senator of the Gombe Central Constituency, Gombe State, Nigeria at the start of the Nigerian Fourth Republic, contested under the platform of the All Peoples party (APP) which later became the All Nigeria Peoples Party (ANPP). He took office on 29 May 1999.

After taking his seat in the Senate in June 1999, Kumo was appointed to committees on Aviation, Communication, Power & Steel, Finance & Appropriation, Tourism & Culture and Social Development & Sports. He became Deputy Chairman of the Senate Services Committee. In April 2002, Kumo spoke out against Borno State Governor Mala Kachallah who had decamped to the People's Democratic Party (PDP), saying he is a politician whose political ship is sinking. He hold a traditional title (Garkuwan Gombe) before his death. He died after short illness from Covid-19 (Corona virus)

== Background ==
Kumo was made National secretary of the All Nigeria Peoples Party (ANPP). In 2007, he accepted a position as special advisor to President Umaru Yar'adua, who had been elected on the PDP platform. In February 2009, he was expelled from his Kumo centre ward in Akko local government of Gombe State, accused of anti-party activities and "connivance" with the ruling PDP. In February 2010, he described the exit of former military ruler Muhammadu Buhari from the party as "good riddance to bad rubbish". Buhari had been the party's presidential candidate in the 2003 and 2007 elections.

He competed in the 26 April 2011, election for Governor of Gombe State, but was defeated by Ibrahim Hassan Dankwambo of the People's Democratic Party (PDP). Following the elections, he said "PDP in Gombe State and its allies – INEC, military personnel, police, NYSC members – connived to rig massively in Gombe State in almost all the 2,218 units during the past elections".

== Death ==
Kumo died on 27 December 2020, from a COVID-19 infection.
