= Kalshingi =

Kalshigi
- ward
- Location in Nigeria
- Coordinates: 10°17′36″N 11°25′17″E
- Country: Nigeria
- State: Gombe State
- LGA: Akko

Government
  - Type: Democratic

Area
  - Total: 2,627 km^{2} (1,014 sq mi)

Population (2006 census)
  - Ethnicities: Fulani Tangale
  - Religions: mostly populated are Muslims and some few Christians
- Time zone: UTC1 (WAT)

Kalshingi is a ward located in Gombe State, Nigeria's Akko Local Government Area. About nine miles or fifteen kilometres away from Kalshingi. Around 430 kilometers (267 mi) is the distance between Kalshingi and Abuja, the capital of Nigeria.

The Post code of the area is 771104.

== Climate ==
In Kalshingi, the wet season is unpleasant and overcast, the dry season is partly cloudy, and the temperature is constant.

== Economy ==
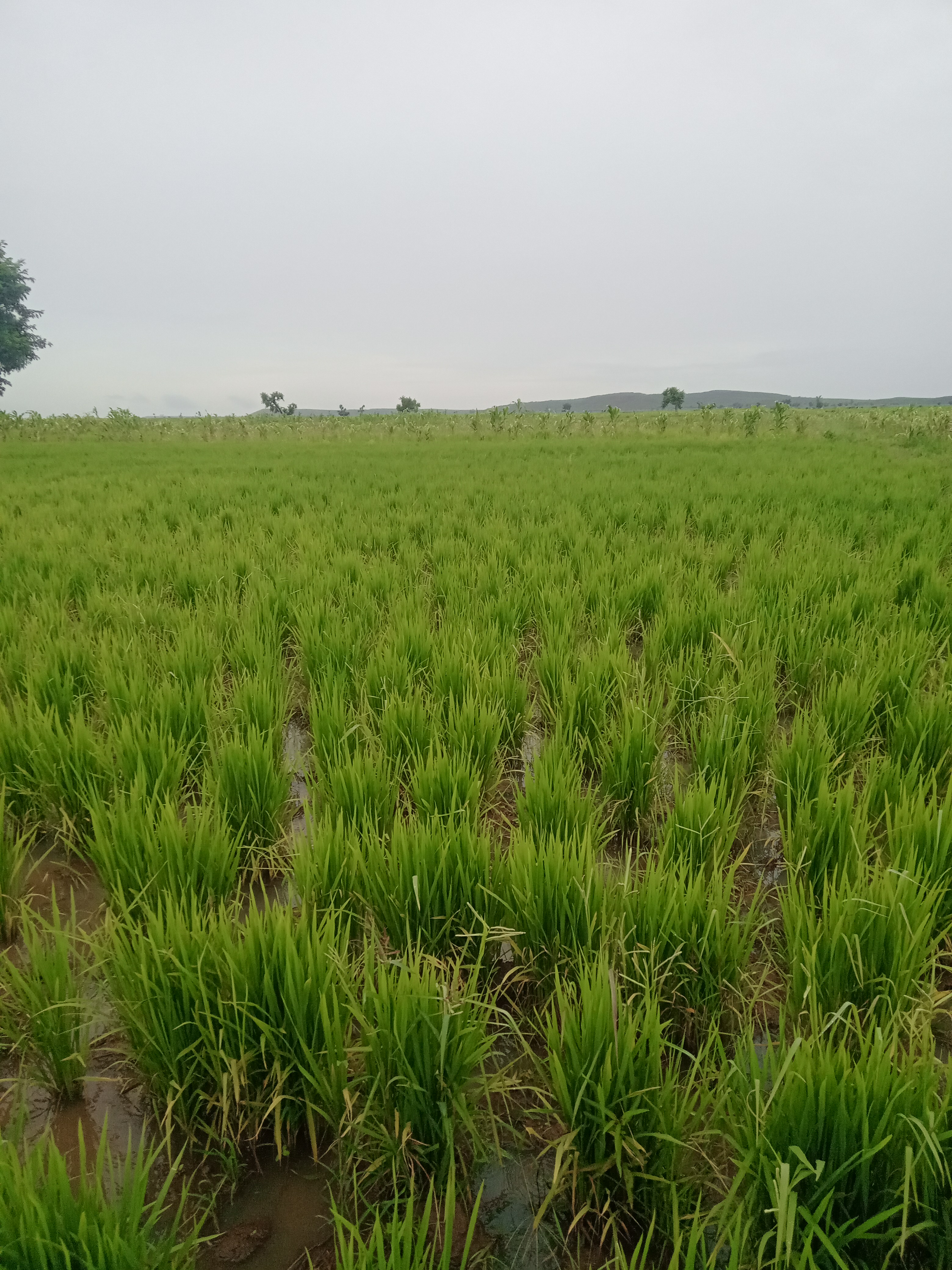
Rice farming is carried out in kalshingi, Akko local Government, Gombe state

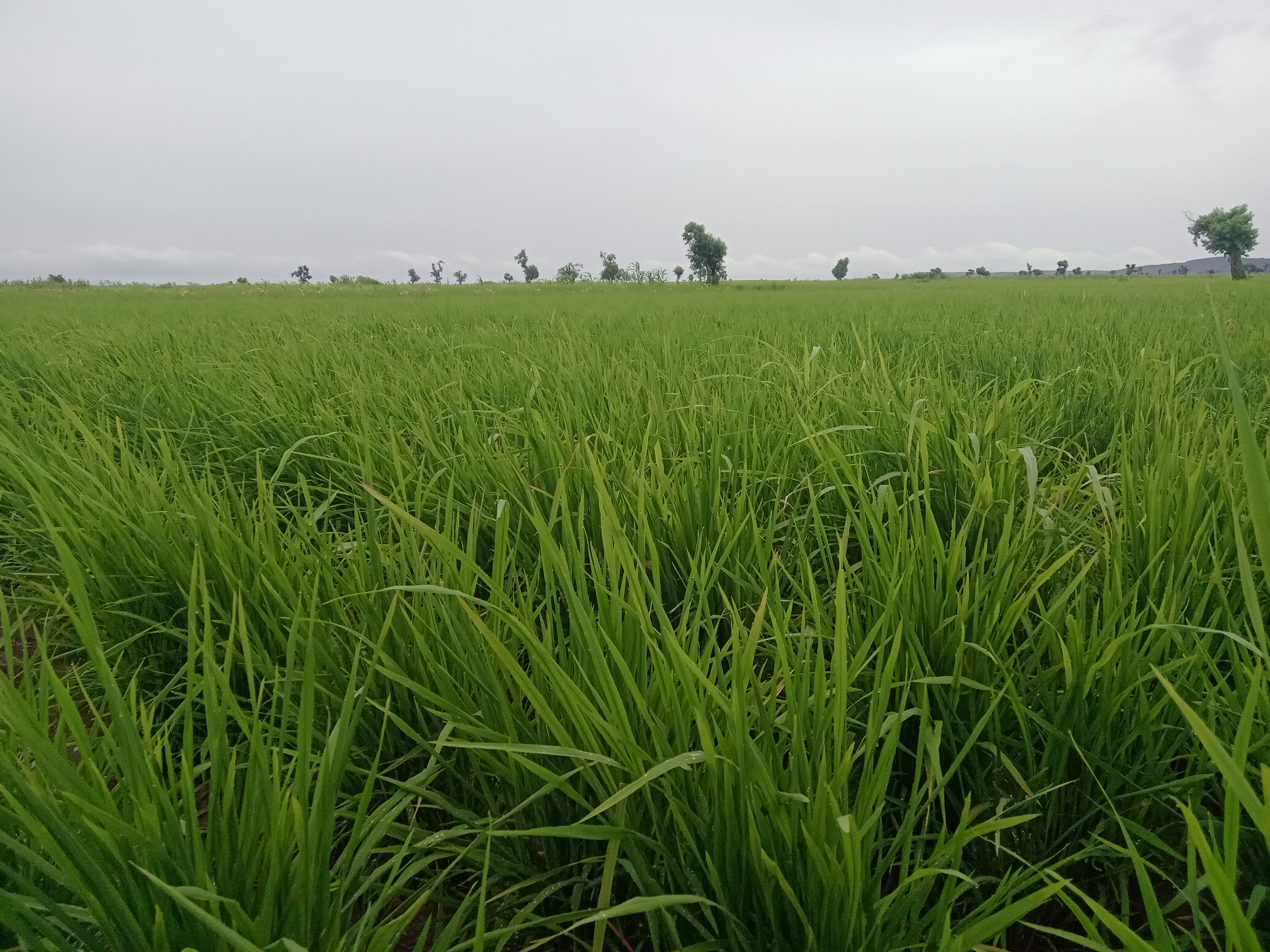
Farming in Kalshingi town, Akko LGA

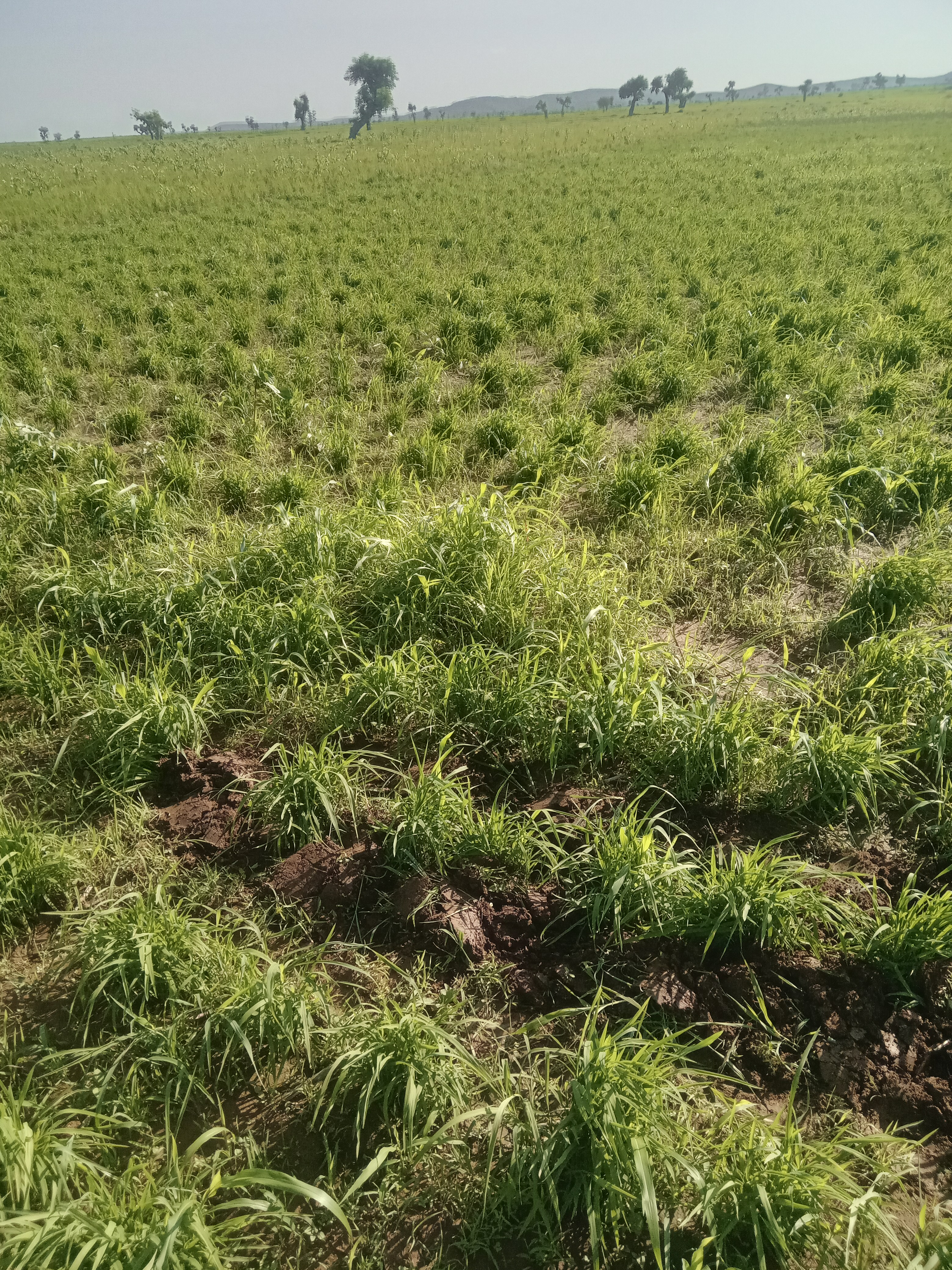
Rice farming

The main source of income for Kalshigi Akko LGA is farming.
