= Idris Abubakar =

Nigerian politician

Senator for Gombe South
- In office May 1999 – May 2003
- Succeeded by: Tawar Umbi Wada

Personal details
- Born: 13 November 1955 Gombe State, Nigeria
- Died: 1 January 2002 (aged 46)

Idris Abubakar (1955–2002) was elected Senator for the Gombe South constituency of Gombe State, Nigeria at the start of the Nigerian Fourth Republic, running on the All People's Party (APP) platform. He took office on 29 May 1999.

== Life ==
Abubakar was born on 13 November 1955 in Gombe State. He became a barrister at law, and was principal partner of Idris Abubakar & Co with offices in Bauchi and Lagos states. He was a member of the House of Representatives during the aborted Nigerian Third Republic (1992–1993). After taking his seat in the Senate in June 1999, he was appointed to committees on Rules & Procedures, Solid Minerals, Banking & Currency, Water Resources, Privatization and Local & Foreign Debts (chairman). He moved for replacement of Senator Evans Enwerem as Senate President in November 1999. Later, Abubakar initiated the motion for impeachment of President Olusegun Obasanjo due to non-implementation of the Appropriation Act.

Abubakar died of diabetes on 10 December 2002 after an extended illness.

== Death ==
He died on 11 December 2002.
