= Ahmed Adamu =

Nigerian economist

- Professor Ahmed Adamu
- Born: 3 March 1985 (age 41); Katsina, Katsina State, Nigeria
- Occupations: Petroleum economist, professor and training facilitator
- Known for: Energy and Petroleum Economics, youth mentorship, lecturing
- Awards: African Young Personality of the year Award (2015), presented by the Africa Youth Awards, January 2016. Named Among 100 Most Influential Young Africans (2016) by the African Youth Awards, August, 2016. Global Achiever Award presented by the Global Achievers Awards at International Roundtable on Governance, Enterprise and Development (IRGED) in Malta, November 2015
- Website: web.facebook.com/prof.ahmedadamu/

Ahmed Adamu is a Nigerian energy and petroleum economist, professor, and author. He is the Dean of Faculty of Management and Social Sciences at Philomath University, Abuja, and was the chairperson of the Commonwealth Youth Council from 2013 to 2016.

== Biography ==
Adamu was elected on November 12, 2013 as the first ever chair of the Commonwealth Youth Council (CYC). He represented Nigeria in international and commonwealth youth programmes, and was the pioneer Chief Whip of the Nigerian Youth Parliament.

Adamu holds a PhD in Petroleum Economics from Newcastle University in the United Kingdom, and a Master's Degree in Energy Economics with Specialization in Oil and Gas Economics from the University of Dundee. He was appointed as a full Professor and Dean of Faculty of Management and Social Sciences at Philomath University, Abuja, in December 2025, where he manages nine departments.

Adamu has published books entitled Comparative Assessment of Petroleum Sharing Contracts in Nigeria, Energy and Petroleum Economics, and a book on leadership and personal development entitled You are a Leader. He is a member of many international and national professional organizations. He was honoured with the Global Achievers Award by the Global Achievers Awards, Outstanding Service Award by the Commonwealth, Award of Excellence by the Commonwealth Youth Council and African Achiever of the year for 2015 by the African Achievers Awards. He was also honored as an inspirational Nigerian by Those Who Inspire Ltd.
