= Alhassan Mohammed Gani =

Nigerian academic (1959–2025)

Vice-chancellor of Federal University Kashere
- Chancellor: Federal University of Kashere, Gombe State
- Deputy: Professor. S.L. Kela (Academic)
- Zirra
- Deputy: Professor. (Admin)

Personal details
- Born: 1959
- Died: 27 July 2025 (aged 66)
- Education: University of Jos
- Occupation: Educator

Alhassan Mohammed Gani (1959 – 27 July 2025) was a Nigerian academic and administrator who was the onetime vice-chancellor of Federal University Kashere, in Gombe state.

Gani worked with several staff of the University to improve the institution. He was a Modern professor of the Internet of Things, and he was able to make a lot of impact with the help of the ICT at the period of his tenure. They have been able to make a lot of changes in the school infrastructure and ICT development.

== Early life and education ==
Gani was born in 1959 in Delgi, a local government area in Plateau State (but then in British Nigeria). He began his early education at the central school, Delgi from 1966 to 1973. He enrolled in a government secondary school, Pankshin, where he graduated with a certificate with distinction. In 1978 he obtained his BSc in Botany with an upper class from the University of Jos in the years 1980 to 1984.

== Career ==
Gani went to the University of London where he obtained his MSc certificate in applied plant science in 1988. He then earned his Doctoral degree in Plant Physiology at Abubakar Tafawa Balewa University. He became a professor there in 2006.

== Death ==
Gani died on 27 July 2025, at the age of 66.
