= Umar Usman Dukku =

Nigerian politician

Senator of the Federal Republic of Nigeria from Gombe State North District
- In office 29 May 1999 – 29 May 2003
- Succeeded by: Haruna Garba

Personal details
- Born: Gombe State, Nigeria
- Party: People's Democratic Party

Umar Usman Dukku was elected Senator for the Gombe North constituency of Gombe State, Nigeria at the start of the Nigerian Fourth Republic, running on the People's Democratic Party (PDP) platform. He took office on 29 May 1999. After taking his seat in the Senate in June 1999, he was appointed to committees on Selection, Ethics (vice chairman), Foreign Affairs, Police Affairs, and State & Local Government. Later, he was appointed Chairman of the Senate Committee on National Population. After leaving office, Dukku became Chairman of the Kaduna Polytechnic Governing Council.
