= Tangale people =

Nigerian ethnic group

Tangale
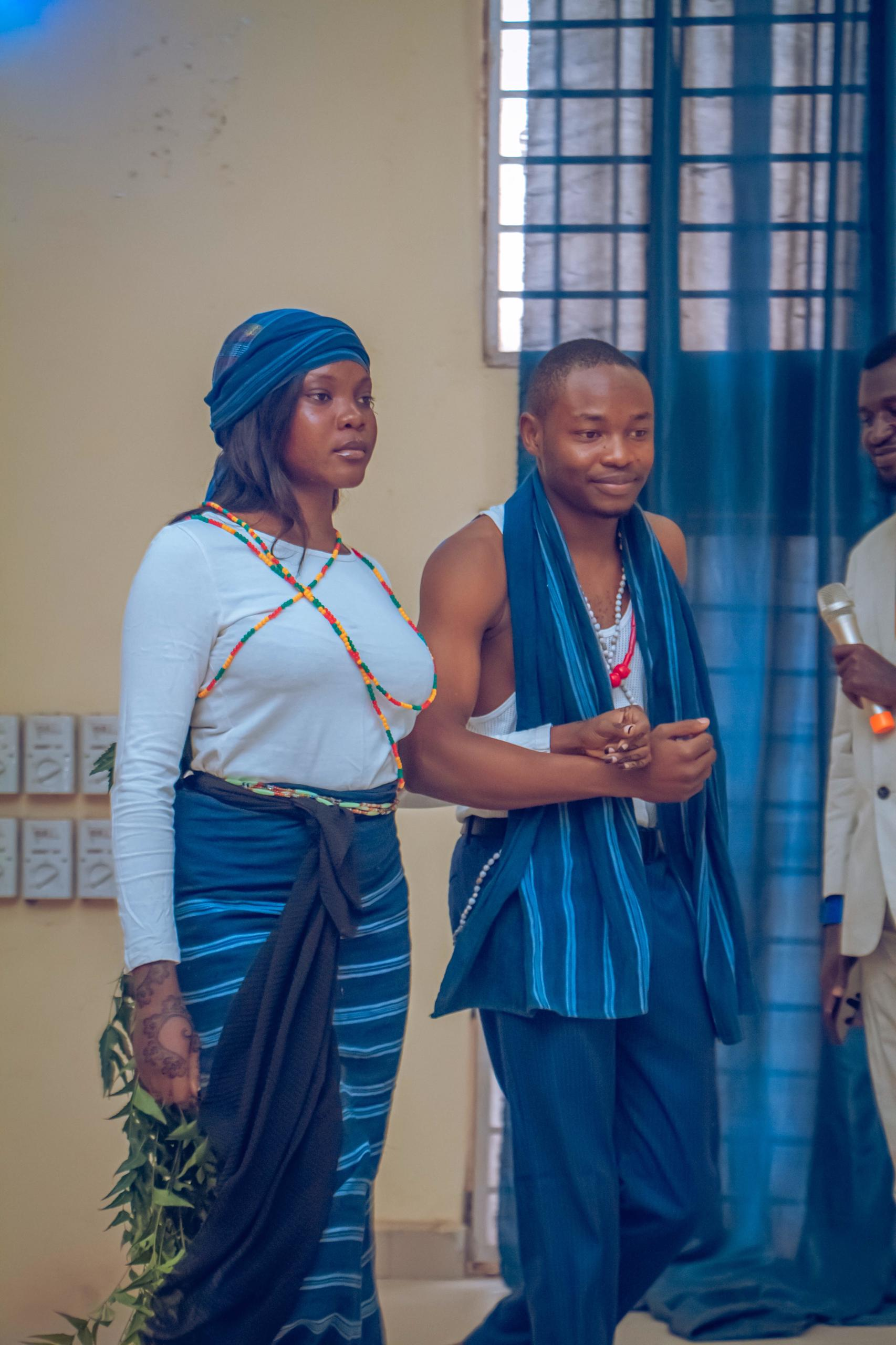

Total population
- 310,000

Regions with significant populations
- Gombe State; (Billiri, Kaltungo, Akko, Shongom and Balanga LGAs); Bauchi State; (Alkaleri LG)

Languages
- Native: Tangale; Second Languages: Hausa, English

Religion
- Christianity; Minor: Islam, Traditional beliefs

The Tangale people are one of the ethnic groups in Northern Nigeria, situated in Gombe State. They speak the Tangale language (Po Tangle) and derived their name from “Tangal”, a chief of Billiri (Western Tangale) in the present day Gombe state in Nigeria. It is believed that Tangal was instrumental in organizing the clans under his leadership and because of this, the people under him were referred to as the Tangale (as it was customary in many African communities to name a land or ethnic group after their leader).

== History of Settlement ==
The Tangale people are migrants from Yemen through Egypt and then to the present Borno State. However, due to constant inter-tribal conflicts, they had to keep migrating from one place to another. Eventually, they settled in at least seven different locations before they came to their presently known settlement, four Local Government Areas of Gombe State; Akko, Billiri, Kaltungo and Shongom. A list of some of those places they settled at include; SanumKude (also known as Big San) near Ngazargamu and Kupto. Kupto was like the Biblical ‘Corinth’; a place where different tribes and groups came together to co-exist and co-habit. At Kupto, the Tangale’s lived together with the Lunguda, Kare-Kare, Tera, Waja, Bolewa, Songom and other neighbouring tribes. It was from Kupto that they further migrated to find a new shelter; mostly mountainous areas which most felt were safer from the frequent raids and attacks they encountered from marauders.

=== Culture ===
The ancient Tangale people were warriors and In the past, adult males were supposed to show their manhood by fighting, and as proof of their courage, they were required to bring the heads of the enemy they had murdered with them upon returning from the battleground. These combat trophies were given to a priest, who placed them under the family's holy tree.

== Mai ==
The Mai is the Traditional head of the Tangale nation. The title has been in use by the Tangale people since ancient times during their periods of migrations to refer to the leader of the moving group. Today two Mai stools exist in Tangaleland; The Mai Tangle who is the traditional head of the Tangale West Chiefdom headquartered in Billiri of Billiri LGA and The Mai Kaltungo whose stool is located in Kaltungo, heading the eastern Tangale people of Kaltungo and Shongom LGAs. Since the year 1295 until 2021, the western Tangale people have had 15 rulers called Mai Tangle governing the affairs of their land.

SN	NAME	PERIOD OF REIGN	DURATION ON THRONE
1	Mai Kiu (Giu)	1295 – 1360	65 Years
2	Mai Tangal	1360 – 1445	85 Years
3	Mai Somboro	1445 – 1505	60 Years
4	Mai Akwi	1525 – 1605	80 Years
5	Mai Asonong	1605 – 1680	75 Years
X	No Ruler	1680 – 1700	20 Years
6	Mai Wuni	1700 – 1780	80 Years
7	Mai Mela	1780 – 1830	50 Years
8	Mai Dula	1830 – 1850	20 Years
9	Mai Sheru I	1850 – 1865	15 Years
10	Mai Bilam	1865 – 1888	23 Years
11	Mai Wana	1888 – 1912	24 Years
12	Mai Yamba Palpalu	1912 – 1951	39 Years
13	Mai Iliyasu Maiyamba	1951 – 1986	35 Years
14	Mai Muhammadu Iliyasu Maiyamba	1986 – 1996	10 Years
X	No Ruler	1996 – 2001	5 Years
15	Mai Abdu Buba Maisheru II	2001 – 2021	20 Years

After the demise of Mai Abdu Buba Maisheru II, the Governor Muhammad Inuwa Yahaya of Gombe state appointed the current Mai Tangle, Malam Danladi Sanusi-Maiyamba.

Sensing the Governor was going to announce Malam Sanusi, the Tangale people took to the street to oppose the move. Aside the Tangale people, other bodies like the Middle-Belt Forum have asked the Governor to respect the choice of the people, but Gov. Inuwa went ahead and announced his choice. However, the Tangale people have since then refused to recognise Malam Sanusi as their royal head. Their grievance is hung on the fact that he was not their choice.

During the election for successor to Maisheru II by the Tangale kingmakers, only three out of 18 contestants secured votes; Dr. Musa Idris Maiyamba got 5 votes, Malam Ahmed Magaji got 2 votes, and Malam Danladi Sanusi also 2 votes.

Three years in office, Malam Danladi has not been able to mobilize support, because the people have continually opposed him - they maintain their position of not recognising him as their ruler.

== Languages ==
The native language of the Tangale Tribe is Po Tangale also called Po Mamu by the eastern Tangale people. The language is spoken by a large majority of Tangale people especially among rural dwellers but due to the dominance of Hausa language in Northern Nigeria, most Tangale people are also able to speak Hausa fluently. A good percentage of Tangale people are able to speak and write in English language owing to colonial legacy and a relatively high literacy level.

== Cuisine ==
The Tangale people's cuisine incorporates a large variety of locally produced and readily available plant food materials like corn, sorghum, cowpea, peanuts, bambaranuts and sesame.

Tradition Tangale cuisine include; Dipo, Kumbam, Shaka kodo, Ronjo, Kar bayo; prepared with a special type of daddawa (locust beans) called Dwaldin, Robe-robe, Ed mammu, Kwaksak and Shinga. Adau (made from fried and ground sesame seasoned with potash) is especially common among the eastern Tangale people, the consumption of which is a necessary marriage rite. Mutton is a very important part of the Tangale dish as well as a variety of "bush meats".

The native drinks of the Tangale people include; Am-shau, Am-dik-dik and Men which is a form of locally brewed beer.

Readily available fruits like Enji (pumpkin), Kanje (deleb palm fruit and tender roots), Wulot (black plum), Landondon (blood plum), Kwalak (shea fruit) and La'awe also form a very important part of the meal of the Tangale people.

== Religion ==
The Tangale people were mostly idol/ spirit worshipers before the advent of colonial rule. They had spirits like Nanamudo (Mother of Death), and Yamba (the goddess of creation). Present-day Tangale people have deserted their traditional idol worship and are now predominantly Christian and a small percentage adhere to Islam and traditional religion.

== Festivals ==
- Pissi Tangale festival
- ‘Bai’ Carnival/ Palam Tangle(Dog festival)
- Eku festival
- Tangra
- Wula
- Pe Kodok
- Pand Kungo
