= Anthony Siyako Yaro =

Nigerian politician

Anthony Siyako Yaro is a Nigerian politician. He currently serves as the Senator representing Gombe South district in Gombe state in the 10th National Assembly under the platform of the People Democratic Party (PDP).
