= Abubakar Mohammed =

Nigerian politician

Senator Sa’ad Mohammed

Senator of the Federal Republic of Nigeria from Gombe State Central District
- In office May 2003 – May 2007
- Preceded by: Saidu Kumo
- Succeeded by: Audu Idris Umar

Personal details
- Born: January 28
- Died: January 15, 2021

Sa’ad Abubakar Mohammed was elected Senator for Gombe Central constituency in Gombe State, Nigeria in April 2003 on the People's Democratic Party (PDP) platform. He held office from May 2003 until May 2007. He was appointed a member of the committees on Works and on Security and Intelligence. He did not run for re-election in the April 2007 contest.
