= Audu Idris Umar =

Nigerian politician

Senator Abdullahi idris Umar

Senator for Gombe Central
- In office 29 May 2007 – May 2011
- Preceded by: Abubakar Mohammed
- Succeeded by: Mohammed Danjuma Goje

Personal details
- Born: 28 December 1959 (age 66) Gombe State, Nigeria
- Party: All Progressive Congress

Abdullahi Idris Umar (born 28 December 1959) is a former Senator that represent Gombe Central constituency of Gombe State, Nigeria. He assumed office on the 29 May 2007 under the People Democratic Party (PDP).

== Early life and education ==
Umar was born on 28 December 1959. He received his Bachelor of Laws (LL.B Hon.) Degree. He went to Nigerian Law School, Victoria Island, Lagos. He was appointed State Counsel to the Ministry Of Justice, Bauchi.

== Political career ==
- Member House of Representatives, Yamaltu deba 1999-2003
- Member House of Representatives, Yamaltu deba 2003-2007
- Senator Gombe central constituency, 2007-2011
- Minister of Transport, 2011-2015
