= Abubakar Habu Hashidu =

Nigerian politician (1944–2018)

Governor of Gombe State
- In office 29 May 1999 – 29 May 2003
- Deputy: Joshua Lidani
- Preceded by: Mohammed Bawa
- Succeeded by: Mohammed Danjuma Goje

Personal details
- Born: 10 April 1944 Hashidu, Northern Region, British Nigeria (now in Gombe State, Nigeria)
- Died: 27 July 2018 (aged 74)
- Party: All People's Party (APP)
- Spouse: Hajiya Aishatu Abubakar Hashidu
- Children: Aishatu, Zariyatu, Ummul-khair, Mohammed, Abdulkadir, Umar, Samirah, Raihana
- Education: Lincoln University
- Occupation: Politician

Alhaji Abubakar Habu Hashidu (10 April 1944 – 27 July 2018) was a Nigerian politician who served as a Minister of Water Resources, minister of Agriculture and also Minister of Rural Development then further elected as governor of Gombe State from 1999 to 2003 under the platform of All People's Party (APP).

== Early life and education ==
Hashidu was born on 10 April 1944 in Gombe State, Nigeria. He attended Hashidu Primary School, Gombe Senior Primary School, and Bauchi Secondary School. He later studied at the School of Agriculture, Ahmadu Bello University. He obtained a bachelor's degree from Lincoln University in the United States and attended professional training programmes at the University of Missouri, the University of New Hampshire, the University of Pittsburgh, and Utah State University.

== Political Career ==
Hashidu was the minister of Water Resources as well as a minister of Agriculture and Rural Development during the military regime of General Ibrahim Babangida. He was also a member of the Vision 2010 committee set up by General Sani Abacha to chart a developmental road-map for the country.

Hashidu was the first elected governor of Gombe State, Nigeria, taking office on 29 May 1999, on the platform of the All People's Party (APP).

His Deputy Governor was Joshua Lidani.

In January 2003, the All Nigeria Peoples Party (APP) endorsed Hashidu as its gubernatorial candidate for the April 2003 elections.

He failed to be re-elected and conceded with praise for the Independent National Electoral Commission(INEC).

He was again candidate for governor of Gombe State in 2007 on the Democratic People's Party (DPP) platform.

Hashidu died in his house in the early hours of 27 July 2018, after a protracted illness.

== See also ==
- Ibrahim Hassan Dankwambo
- Mohammed Danjuma Goje
- Muhammad Inuwa Yahaya
