= Sa'idu Ahmed Alkali =

Nigerian politician

Senator of the Federal Republic of Nigeria from Gombe State North District
- Preceded by: Usman Bayero Nafada

Personal details
- Born: 12 February 1969 (age 57) Gombe State, Nigeria
- Party: All ProgressiveCongress APC
- Parent: Khadi Ahmed Saidu Alkali

Sa'idu Ahmad Alkali (born 12 February 1969), a Nigerian politician and Senator for Gombe North senatorial district, initially elected in 2010.

He was elected as Senator for the Gombe North senatorial district of Gombe State, Nigeria in an August 2010 by-elections after the death of the incumbent Senator Kawu Peto Dukku. He was reelected in the 2011 general elections, running on the People's Democratic Party (PDP) platform. He however failed to secure the party's ticket in the 2014 primaries which made him defect to the APC in 2019 and won.

Alkali lost re-election to former Gov. Ibrahim Hassan Dankwambo in the 2023 general elections making it a revenge where he also defeated the latter in the 2019 general elections.

== Early life and education ==
Sa'idu Ahmed Alkali was born on 12 February 1969 in Dukku, Gombe State, Nigeria. He is the son of the late Khadi Ahmed Sa'idu Alkali. He attended primary and secondary schools in Gombe State before proceeding to the University of Maiduguri, where he obtained a Bachelor of Science degree in Economics. After completing his education, he began his career in public service, working with the Dukku Local Government Council before joining the Independent National Electoral Commission (INEC).

== Public service ==
Following the election of Danjuma Goje as Governor of Gombe State in 2003, Alkali was appointed Executive Secretary of the Gombe State Muslim Pilgrims Welfare Board. In 2007, he was appointed Commissioner for Information in Gombe State, where he supervised government information and public communication. His service in the state executive council contributed to his emergence as a prominent political figure in Gombe State.

After the death of Kawu Peto Dukku in April 2010, he emerged as the consensus candidate for the PDP primarily because was an indigene of Dukku Local Government Area. This decision made based on geographical location was criticized by some party members.

In the April 2011 general elections, Alkali emerged the winner, gaining 136,850 votes on the PDP platform. Mu'azu Umar Babagoro of the Congress for Progressive Change (CPC) scored 81,519 and Engineer Abdullahi Sa'ad Abubakar of the All Nigeria People's Party (ANPP) received 36,427 votes.

== Senate career ==
Alkali entered the National Assembly after winning the August 2010 by-election for the Gombe North Senatorial District following the death of Senator Kawu Peto Dukku. He was subsequently re-elected in the 2011 general election on the platform of the People's Democratic Party (PDP). After joining the All Progressives Congress (APC), he won another term representing Gombe North in the 2019 general election.

During his time in the Senate, he served on several standing committees and participated in legislative activities relating to public administration, infrastructure and national development. His legislative career spanned the Sixth, Seventh and Ninth National Assemblies.

== Minister of transportation ==
On 16 August 2023, President Bola Tinubu appointed Alkali as Nigeria's Minister of Transportation after his nomination was confirmed by the Senate. As minister, he assumed responsibility for overseeing the country's rail transportation system, land transport policy and other agencies under the Federal Ministry of Transportation.

Since assuming office, Alkali has emphasized transport infrastructure as a driver of economic growth and national development. His administration has supported the implementation of transport sector reforms, improvements in railway services and policies aimed at strengthening multimodal transportation across Nigeria.

== Transport policy initiatives ==
As Minister of Transportation, Alkali has promoted reforms intended to modernise Nigeria's transport sector. He has advocated the development of a National Land Transport Policy to improve coordination across road and rail transportation and strengthen regulatory oversight. He has also supported the adoption of smart mobility systems, digital innovation and private-sector participation in transport infrastructure.

In 2024, he stated that reforms to Nigeria's railway sector, including the proposed unbundling of the Nigerian Railway Corporation, were intended to encourage private investment, improve operational efficiency and expand rail services across the country.

== Awards and honours ==
- Fellow Institute of Corporate Administration.
