= Pindiga Town =

Coordinates: 9°59′07″N 10°57′06″E

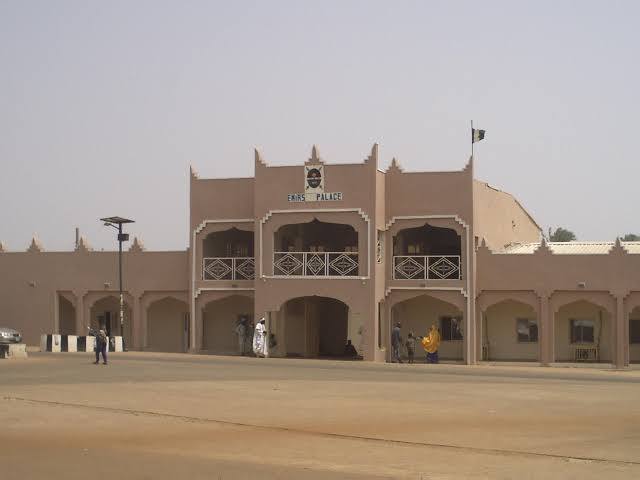
Pindiga Emirate

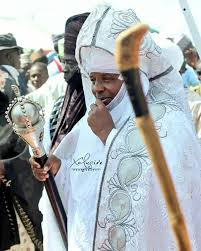
Emir Of Pindiga

Pindiga is the capital of the Pindiga Emirate located in Akko Local government area of Gombe state, Nigeria. Pindiga is a house with a fascinating history that was built by Jukun between the 16th and 17th century. The village began with a small group of people living on a rock and has now grown to become the fifth largest Emirates in Gombe State.

== History ==
Pindiga is a historic town in Akko Local Government Area, Gombe State; the Jukun people from Yemen began to settle in the region of the back people in the 16th and 17th century.

The emir "Sarki" of Gombe Buba Yaro began waging war against them in the village of Binga in the year 1815 A.D., but despite all of his efforts, he was unable to overcome them until the end of his life.

The fight continues in this manner until the period of Gombe's emir, Umarun Kwairanga. The soldiers who combat the Jukun in the Binga region form a serious assembly of soldiers from Bauchi, Misau, Jama'are, and other places. Unless those who flee in the hope of saving their lives, the style of battle waged against them is called as operation kill all.

The few who fled subsequently returned and settled on a rock they named "Kartum." They opted to name their new colony after the name given to them as a result of their previous settlement in Khartoum, which is now in Sudan.

After a long amount of time on the rock, they decide to migrate to a location that is less than one and a half kilometers from their previous location and dwell on another rock known as puli, which is now known as Jukun rock and is located behind Pindiga.

After colonial overlords defeated Gombe in a fight in 1903, they dropped Jukuns from the cliffs and settled in Pindiga.

== Climate ==
Pindiga experiences a stifling and cloudy wet season, partly cloudy dry season, and year-round heat. The average annual temperature fluctuates between 14 °C (57 °F) and 37 °C (99 °F), seldom falling below 12 °C (53 °F) or rising over 40 °C (104 °F).

=== Average temperature ===
With an average daily high temperature of 36 °C (96 °F), the hot season spans 2.3 months, from February 13 to April 22. Typically reaching a high of 36 °C (97 °F) and a low of 23 °C (74 °F), April is the warmest month in Pindiga. With an average daily maximum temperature below 29 °C (85 °F), the cool season spans 3.2 months, from July 4 to October 9. December is the coldest month of the year in Pindiga, with an average high temperature of 32 °C (89 °F) and low temperature of 14 °C (58 °F).

== Festival ==
Pindiga which is one of the towns and Villages in Akko Local Government area has two peculiar festivals; Eku and Tangra festival.

== Schools ==
Primary schools located in Pindiga town include Central primary school, Udan-boma primary school, Kwagol, Garin Rijiya, Sumbe, Garin Alkali primary school, GJSS Pindiga and Government Comprehensive Secondary School Pindiga.

The only federal University found in the town is the Federal University Kashere (FUK), Gombe state. It is centered on pursuits and acquisition of knowledge as well as commitment to service of learning, The Motto of FUK is 'Education for Global Citizenship'.
