= Mohammed Danjuma Goje =

Nigerian politician

Muhammed Danjuma Goje
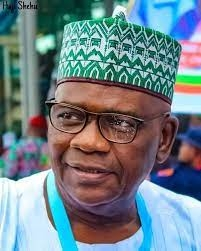

Minister Of State, Power & Steel
- In office 1999–2001

Executive Governor of Gombe State
- In office May 2003 – May 2011
- Preceded by: Abubakar Habu Hashidu
- Succeeded by: Ibrahim Hassan Dankwambo

Senator Representing Gombe Central
- Incumbent
- Assumed office May 2011
- Preceded by: Audu Idris Umar

Personal details
- Born: 10 October 1952 (age 73) Pindiga Town, Akko, Gombe State, Nigeria
- Party: All Progressive Congress(APC)
- Spouse(s): Late Hajiya Fatima Yelwa Goje; Hajiya Aminatu Dahiru Binani
- Children: 9
- Education: Ahmadu Bello University, Zaria
- Website: www.danjumagoje.com

Mohammed Danjuma Goje (born 10 October 1952) was a former Governor of Gombe State, Nigeria under the platform of the People's Democratic Party (PDP), taking office on 29 May 2003 during the 2003 Gombe State gubernatorial election. He is now a member of the All Progressives Congress (APC).

== Early life and education ==
Goje was born in Pindiga, Akko LGA of Gombe State. He studied political science and graduated from Ahmadu Bello University (ABU) Zaria. He was a member of the Bauchi State House of Assembly (BSHA) from 1979 to 1983. Goje became the Secretary of the National Institute for Medical Research in Yaba, Lagos State in 1984, continuing until 1989.

== Political career ==
On 25 April 1998 Goje contested and won the seat of Senator representing Gombe State Senatorial District on the platform of United Nigeria Congress Party conducted by the National Electoral Commission of Nigeria (NECON) in the aborted democratic transition of General Sani Abacha. He went on to establish his own business, Zaina Nigeria Ltd, from 1989 to 1999. The company was named after his mother, Hajiya Zainab. Goje contested for the seat of Senator in the Nigerian National Assembly in 1998 and later on became the Minister of State, Power and Steel from 1999 to 2001 under President of Nigeria Olusegun Obasanjo. He was a two times elected Governor of Gombe State from 2003 to 29 May 2011. In the April 2011 elections, he was elected Senator for Gombe Central on the PDP ticket. He was then re-elected in 2015, 2019 and 2023 General elections. Before he lost primary election in 2026

== Senate presidency ==
Senator Goje stepped down for Senator Ahmad Lawan from the Senate Presidency race after meeting with President Muhammadu Buhari on Thursday, 6 June 2019. From June 2019 through June 2023, Senator Danjuma Goje is the chairman of the Marine Transport Committee in the Senate.

== Awards and honours ==
- Awards of Excellence and Exemplary Leadership, (YOWICAN)
- Award of Excellence, Nigerian Medical Association
- Special Merit Award (ASCON)
- Youth Merit Award, 2009
- Merit Award (NIOB)

== See also ==
- List of governors of Gombe State
