= Amos Bulus Kilawangs =

Nigerian politician

Senator Amos Bulus Kilawangs

Senator of the federal Republic of Nigeria

Member of the U.S. House of Representatives from Gombe
- Incumbent
- Assumed office 2019
- Running mate: Hajiya Binta Bello(PDP)
- Constituency: Gombe South

Personal details
- Born: 1960 or 1961 (age 65–66)

Amos Bulus Kilawangs (born 1960 or 1961) is a Nigerian politician. He is the Senator Representing Gombe South Senatorial District He was elected during the February 2019 Nigerian general elections under the platform of the All Progressives Congress (APC). He is also the Vice Chairman at the Delta Committee from June 2019 till June 2023.

== Career ==
In 2017, as a senior officer in the Nigerian Air Force he was promoted from being a group Captain to being the Air commodore along with 27 others.

To ensure operational efficiency and effectiveness, the Nigerian Air Force redeployed Air Commodore Amos Bulus, as Director of Information Technology, HQ NAF.
