= Joshua Lidani =

Nigerian politician

Joshua M. Lidani

National Senator
- In office 2011–2015
- Constituency: Gombe South

Personal details
- Born: 1 October 1957 (age 69)
- Party: All Progressives Congress (APC)
- Education: Ahmadu Bello University
- Profession: Legal practitioner, politician

Joshua M. Lidani (born 1 October 1957) is a former Senator for the Gombe South constituency of Gombe State, Nigeria. Before being elected in 2011, he practiced law. He is a member of All Progressives Congress (APC).
