= Usman Bayero Nafada =

Former Deputy Speaker of Nigerian House of Representatives

Usman Bayero Nafada CON
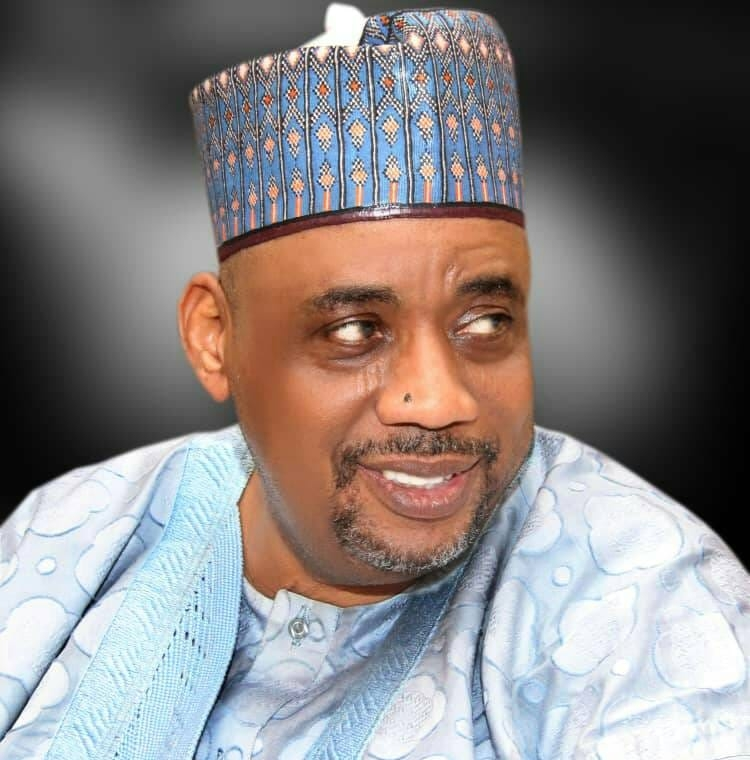

Senator for Gombe North
- In office 9 June 2015 – 9 June 2019

Deputy Speaker of the House of Representatives of Nigeria
- In office 2 November 2007 – 6 June 2011
- Speaker: Dimeji Bankole
- Preceded by: Babangida Nguroje
- Succeeded by: Chukwuemeka Ihedioha

Personal details
- Born: 2 January 1961 (age 65)
- Party: People's Democratic Party
- Occupation: Politician

Senator Usman Bayero Nafada (born 2 January 1961) is a former Deputy Speaker of the House of Representatives of Nigeria representing Dukku/Nafada Federal Constituency of Gombe state, and a former senator for the Gombe North senatorial district in 2015 under the umbrella of the People's Democratic Party (PDP). He was the 2019 Peoples Democratic Party's gubernatorial candidate in Gombe State. Nafada holds different titles and awards which include Sarkin Yakin Nafada, Dan Rimin Gona, Madawakin Akko, Durbin Tangale, Maje Keran Funakaye, Enyi of Igbo Anambara, Garkuwan Matasan Arewa, and Commander of the Order of Niger (CON).

== Early life and education ==
Nafada was born in January 1961 in Gombe State to Bayero Nafada. He holds a teacher's certificate from Ahmadu Bello University (ABU), Zaria, Kaduna State and degrees in accountancy from both ABU and the University of Maiduguri, Maiduguri, Borno State.

== Political career ==
Nafada was a member of the Gombe State House of Assembly. He held the position of Majority Leader of the House and later became Speaker for the All Nigeria Peoples Party (ANPP) from 1999 until 2003, and held the post of Speaker starting in June of that term. He was previously the Assistant State Auditor of Gombe State.

Nafada was elected to the national House of Representatives in 2003 as an ANPP candidate for Dukku/Nafada, but switched to PDP membership when his state began to vote that way. After the resignation of Babangida Nguroje amid the Patricia Etteh corruption scandal, Friday Itulah of Edo State nominated Nafada to succeed Nguroje as Deputy Speaker. He was elected unopposed on 2 November 2007. However, in July 2018, less than a year to the next national election, Nafada, along with 14 other members defected from APC to PDP.
