= Tawar Umbi Wada =

Nigerian politician

Senator for Gombe South
- In office 29 May 2003 – 31 March 2010
- Preceded by: Idris Abubakar

Personal details
- Born: 27 January 1957 Gombe State, Nigeria
- Died: 31 March 2010 (aged 53)

Tawar Umbi Wada (1957–2010) was elected Senator for the Gombe South constituency of Gombe State, Nigeria, taking office on 29 May 2003, and reelected in 2007. He was a member of the People's Democratic Party (PDP).

Wada was born on 27 January 1957. He studied law at the University of Jos, and was called to the bar in 1983. Later he earned a Postgraduate Diploma in Journalism. He was an Assistant Director at the Federal Ministry of Science and Technology and Ministry of Police Affairs, Attorney General and Commissioner of Justice in Gombe State. He also worked with the Corporate Affairs Commission.

During his senate career he chaired the Information and Media and Labour Committees. In a mid-term evaluation of Senators in May 2009, ThisDay noted that he sponsored bills for the Nigerian Academy of Sciences and Enhanced Services for Federal Law Officers. He was the Senate committee chairman on Agriculture before his death. He died on 31 March 2010 in Abuja aged 53.
