= Akko, Nigeria =

Akko
- LGA
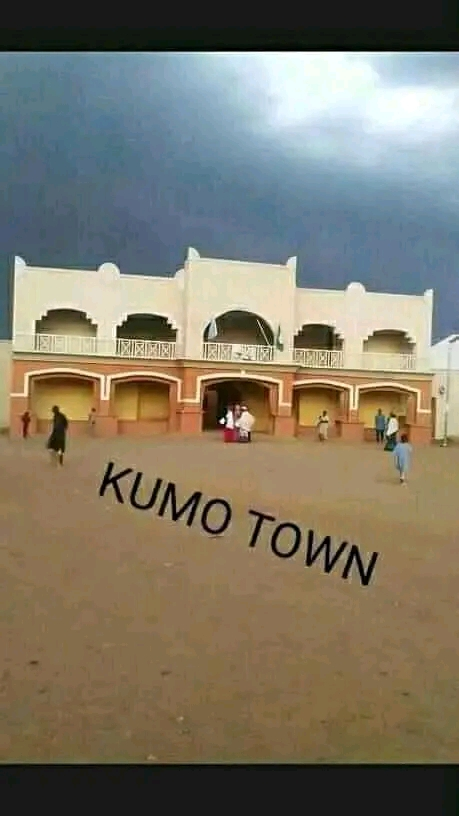
- Motto: AKK babban lamba
- Interactive map of Akko
- Location in Nigeria
- Coordinates: 10°03′00″N 11°13′00″E
- Country: Nigeria
- State: Gombe State
- Headquarters: Kumo

Government
  - Type: Democratic
  - Local Government Chairman and the Head of the Local Government Council: Abubakar Usman Barambu (Dallatun AKKO)

Area
  - Total: 2,627 km^{2} (1,014 sq mi)

Population (2006 census)
  - Total: 337,853
  - Density: 128.6/km^{2} (333.1/sq mi)
  - Ethnicities: Fulani Tangale
  - Religions: mostly populated are Muslims and some few Christians
- Time zone: UTC1 (WAT)
- 3-digit postal code prefix: 771
- ISO 3166 code: NG.GO.AK

Akko is a local government area of Gombe, Gombe State, Nigeria. Its headquarters is in Kumo town on the A345 highway south of the state capital Gombe, about 40 km away. Kumo (headquarter) is a cosmopolitan communities of more than 30 differents tribes, ranging from the dominant Fulani tribe to Tangale, Tera, Hausa and other minorities.

Kumo also serves as the second-largest in the state centre after Gombe Local Government Area, the local government area is made up of three major districts and 11 wards. Akko Local Government Area was created for the main purpose of establishing link between the people at the grassroots, state and the central government levels.

Akko Local Government Area Secretariat, Kumo, Gombe state, Nigeria Akko local government area is under Gombe state, and the current governor is Alhaji Muhammad Inuwa Yahaya, is governing under All Progressives Congress (APC) political party.

The Chairman of Akko local government is Alhaji Abubakar Usaman.

Akko Local Government Area is located in Kumo town and the area council consists of Akko-Amada, Gona, Kumo, Pindiga, Garin Garba, Jalingo, Jauro Tukur, Kembu, Kumo North, Kumo East, Panda, Kumo Central, Lergo, Garin Liman Kumo, Mararraban-Tumu, Tashan Magarya, and many more.

The town of Akko, from which the name of the local government area is originated, is west of Gombe at 10°17′00″N 10°58′00″E.

== Geomorphology ==
The 2627 square kilometre or 1014 square mile Akko local government region has an estimated 39 percent humidity and an estimated 8 km/h wind speed. The dry and wet seasons are the two main seasons in the region, and the average temperature in Akko LGA is reported to be 30 degrees Celsius or 86 degrees Fahrenheit.

Akko has a population of 337,853 at the 2006 census.

The postal code of the area is 771102 to 771104.

There are about 100 secondary schools in Akko LGA.

== Economy ==
With markets like the Tike, Babbar Kusawa, and Tashar Gwari bringing in tens of thousands of buyers and sellers each year, agriculture and commerce are two of the main drivers of the Akko LGA's economy.

== Government ==
The local government Chairman and Deputy Chairman are Abubakar Usman Barambu and Mahmud Saleh Tabra respectively. They are both from the All Progressive Congress political party. The local government area is made up of three major Emirates namely: Akko, Gona and Pindiga.

== Market days ==
As in most northern states of Nigeria, there is much agricultural activity including the following:

- Beans
- Cotton
- Gum arabic
- Groundnut
- Maize
- Millet
- Sorghum
- Tomatoes
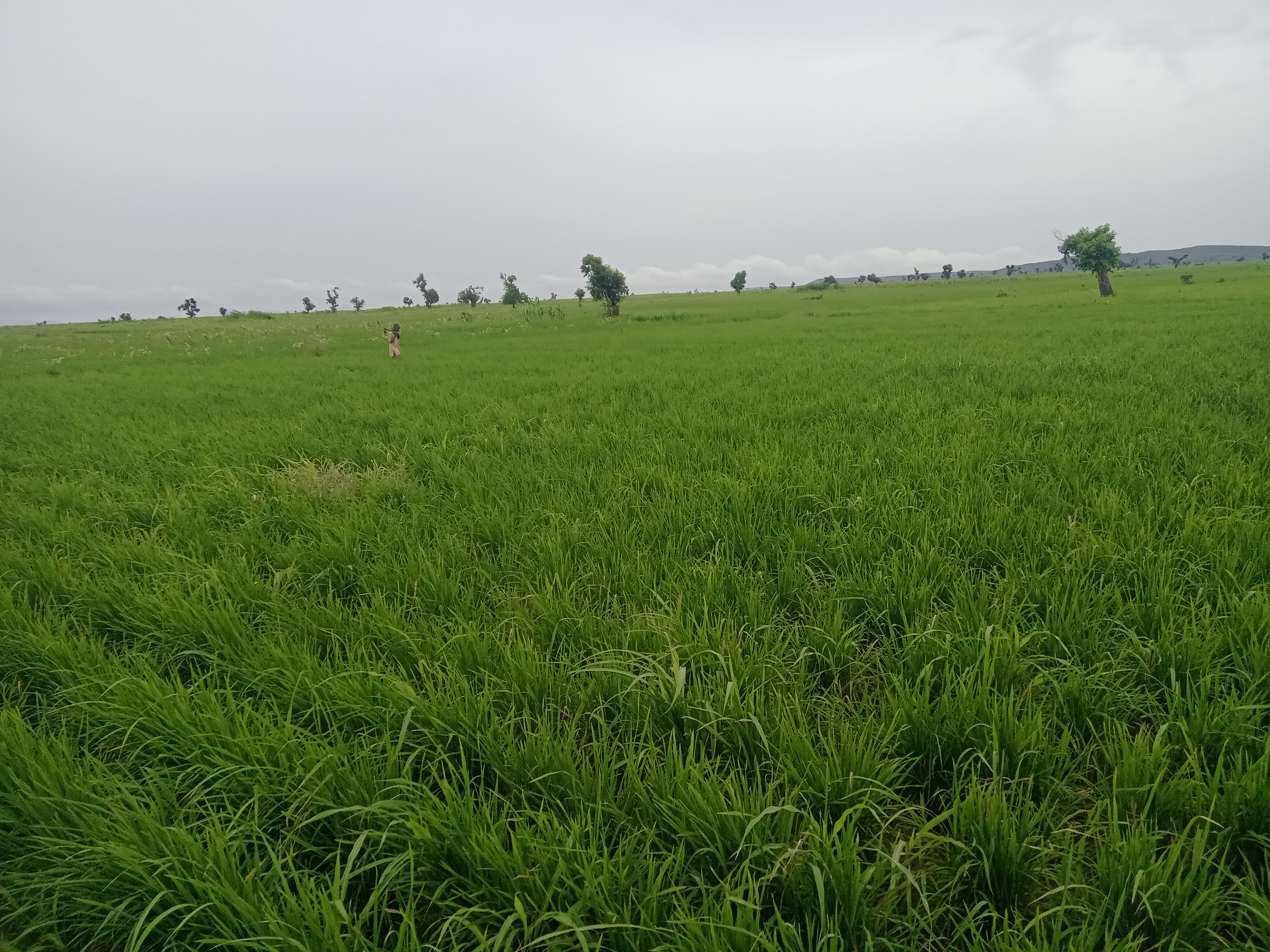
- Rice farming in Akko
  Most of this produce finds its way into the local markets with specific days allotted for towns and villages:
- Monday: Garko, Pindiga & Kalshingi
- Tuesday: Kashere
- Wednesday: None
- Thursday: Kumo
- Friday: Kembu
- Saturday: Tumu, Kalshingi
- Sunday: Tukulma

== Wards in Akko LGA ==
There are 11 wards that exist in Akko Local Government area

1. Akko
2. Garko
3. Kalshingi
4. Kashere
5. Kumo Central
6. Kumo East
7. Kumo North
8. Kumo West
9. Pindiga
10. Tumu
11. Tukulma

== Climate ==
The rainy season in Akko is oppressive and cloudy, the dry season is partly cloudy, and it's hot all year round. The average annual temperature ranges from 13 to 37 degrees Celsius (56 to 99 degrees Fahrenheit) with very little variation above 39 °C (103 °F).

=== Lowest Typical Temperature in Akko ===
With an average daily high temperature of 95 °F, the hot season lasts for 2.3 months, from 19 February to 28 April. With an average high of 97 °F and low of 73 °F, April is the hottest month of the year in Akko.

=== Highest Typical Temperature in Akko ===
With an average daily maximum temperature below 84 °F, the cool season lasts for 3.0 months, from 8 July to 8 October. December is the coldest month of the year in Akko, with average lows of 57 °F and highs of 89 °F.

=== Akko's Cloud ===
The average proportion of sky covered by clouds in Akko varies significantly seasonally throughout the year.

Around 5 November marks the start of Akko's clearer season, which lasts for four months and ends around 5 March.

In Akko, January is the clearest month of the year, with the sky remaining clear, mostly clear, or partly cloudy 57% of the time.

Beginning at 5 March and lasting for 8.0 months, the cloudier period of the year ends around 5 November.

May is the cloudiest month of the year in Akko, with the sky being overcast or mostly cloudy 77% of the time on average during this month.

=== Akko's Precipitation ===
A day that was at least 0.04 inches (or the equivalent) in depth of liquid or liquid-equivalent precipitation. In Akko, the likelihood of rainy days fluctuates wildly throughout the year.

Between 25 May and 6 October, which is the length of the wetter season, there is a larger than 43% probability that any given day would be rainy. In Akko, August has an average of 26.0 days with at least 1.0 millimetre (0.04 inches) of precipitation, making it the month with the most rainy days.

From 6 October to 25 May, there are 7.6 months during which it is drier. The month with the least number of days with at least 1.0 millimetre (0.04 inches) of precipitation in Akko is December, with an average of no days.

== Erosion Control in Akko ==
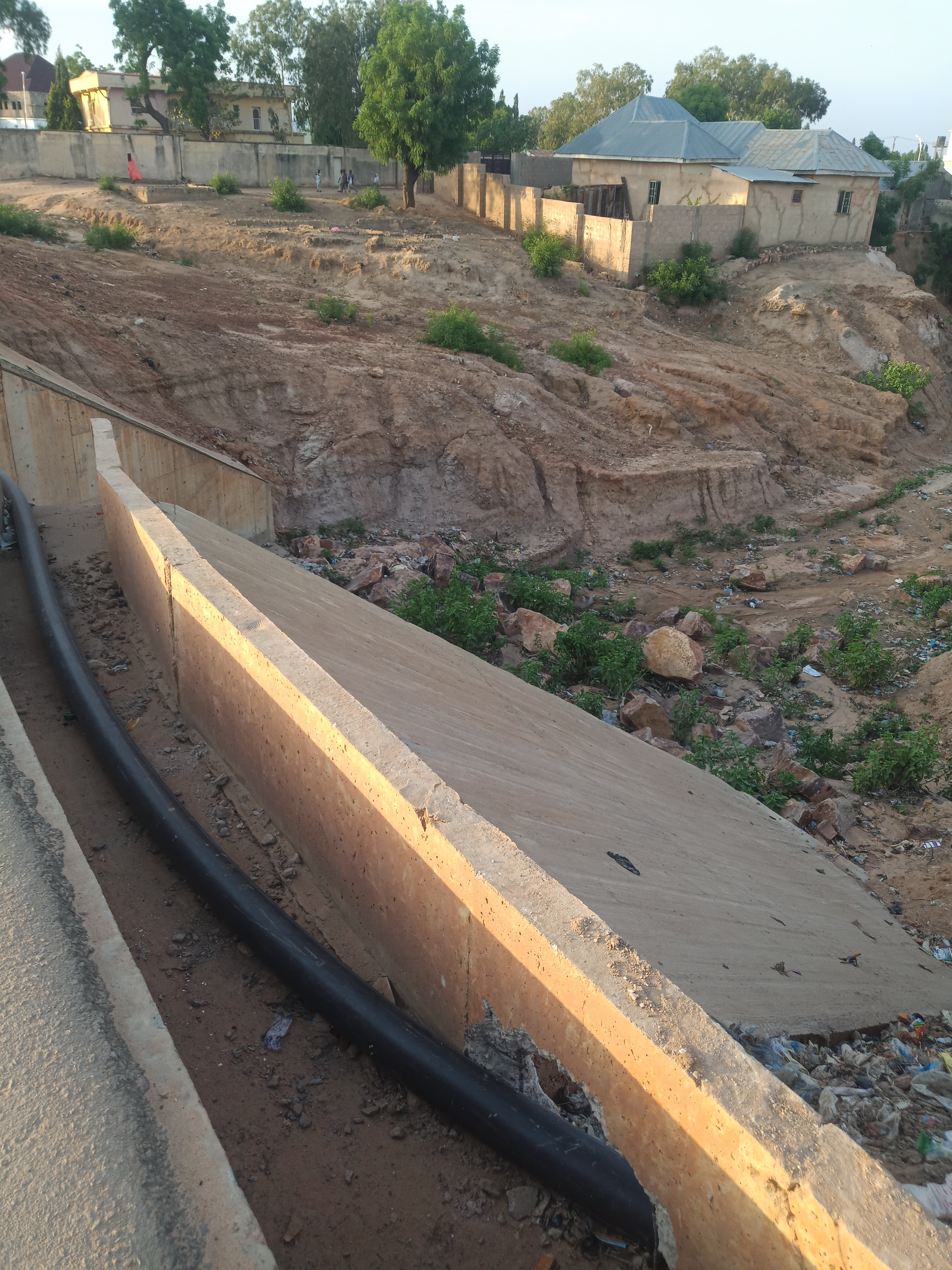
Gully erosion in Akko

Erosion control efforts in Akko Local Government Area (LGA) of Gombe State focus on tackling the long-standing issue of severe gully erosion, particularly in Kumo town, the LGA headquarters. The Gombe State Government has initiated a Naira 18km gully erosion control project targeting erosion and flood-prone areas. The project involves engineering works such as reinforced concrete channels, excavation, backfilling, drainage construction, and retention structures, alongside bioengineering solutions like gabions and reno mattresses for gully bank stabilization. These interventions aim to protect lives and property, restore degraded land, and enhance environmental sustainability in the region.

Community engagement plays a vital role in the project’s success. Local residents are being employed as security personnel and trained in tree planting and waste management practices to help prevent further erosion. Areas such as Kumo Gully Erosion at Anguwan Jauro Musa, which has affected over 300 people in the past two decades, are among the key sites receiving attention. The government has also recommended establishing a dedicated erosion monitoring and control agency to sustain and manage erosion-related challenges across Akko LGA.
