= Buba Yero =

19th century Fulani scholar and founder of Gombe Emirate in Nigeria

Emir of Gombe
- Reign: 1804–1841
- Predecessor: Position established
- Successor: Suleimanu
- Born: Abubakar bin Usman c 1762 near Mada (today in Shelleng, Adamawa State, Nigeria)
- Died: 1841 (aged 78–79); Gombe Abba, Gombe Emirate
- Spouse: Hauwa; Zulai
- Issue: Suleimanu; Muhammadu Kwairanga

Abubakar bin Usman (c. 1762 – 1841), most commonly known as Buba Yero or Modibbo Gombe, was a Fulani Islamic scholar, military leader and the founder of the Gombe Emirate in what is now northeastern Nigeria. A disciple of Usman dan Fodio, he played a major role in the early 19th century Sokoto jihad, leading campaigns that extended the Caliphate's influence across the Gongola Basin and surrounding regions, including parts of the Bornu Empire to the north and the Middle Benue region to the south.

== Early life and education ==
Abubakar bin Usman was born around 1762 in the Shellen/Shani area, at the confluence of the Gongola and Hawal rivers. His paternal grandfather, Aliyu Ukuba, was a Fulani who migrated from Rai Buba (in present-day Cameroon) to Mayo Faro. From there, Ukuba's son Usman went north across the Benue to Petembere, near Shellen. There, or at nearby Lakumna, he married Janaba, a daughter of Gongon, the Kanakuru chief of Shellen. When their son Abubakar was born, Janaba's father, Gongon, is said to have nicknamed the boy "Buba Yero" because of his large eyes (yero being the Kanakuru word for eyes). Buba Yero was orphaned at a young age; his father died shortly before his birth, and his mother later succumbed to smallpox at Shellen.

As a child, Buba Yero first learned to read the Qur'an. He later left home to further his studies at Birni Gazargamu, the capital of the Bornu Empire. On his way there, he was captured and enslaved by the N'gizim or Kerikeri near Potiskum. After several years in captivity, he regained his freedom and continued to Gazargamu, where he studied religious sciences for some time. Another version of the tradition claims he was prevented from completing his journey and returned home after his liberation. In around 1774–1786, he travelled to Gobir and studied under Usman dan Fodio at Degel. The duration of his stay there is uncertain, though it is likely that he returned to Shellen several times during this period. Upon completing his studies, he resettled in Shellen.

== Early campaigns ==
According to tradition, before his return to Shellen, Buba Yero was instructed by Usman dan Fodio to remain at peace with the surrounding non-Muslim communities of the Gongola Basin area. However, he disobeyed these orders and began subduing the region.

The reason for his unauthorised attacks is unclear. The general account is that while Buba Yero was leading his clan, the Fulanin Janafulu, in a quarrel against the Fulanin Kiri, led by Hamma Ruwa, his grandfather Gongon joined him in the conflict. Gongon was killed, and his Kanakuru followers then drove both Fulani groups out of Shellen and Kiri. The expelled Fulbe sought refuge among northern Fulani clans and united under Buba Yero's command. Historian Victor N. Low notes that the region, as early as the 1760s and well into the late 18th century, had experienced prolonged conflicts between the Fulani and various other ethnic groups, particularly in southern Bornu. Thus, when Buba Yero assembled an army and went to war, "his unauthorized action, though irregular, was not altogether unprecedented, nor, it could be said, premature."

The exact sequence and dating of Buba Yero's early campaigns remain uncertain. From Gulani, his forces appear to have first moved north, raiding several major towns between there and Damaturu. He next marched through Tera and Jeraland, the Biu Emirate, and the settlements of his former Kanakuru hosts. He then advanced further south as far as the Benue, where he reportedly received a message from Usman dan Fodio recalling him to Gulani. According to Gombe tradition, Usman was angered by his campaigns and denied Buba Yero the title to most of the territory east of the Gongola, granting it instead to Modibbo Adama, who later established the Adamawa Emirate. By 1798, he had controlled much of the Lower Gongola valley.

== Gombe jihad ==
Buba Yero withdrew his troops to the right bank of the Gongola River and made Ribadu his main base for the next sixteen years (c. 1802–1818). Soon after arriving at Ribadu, he received orders from Usman dan Fodio in 1804 to begin a jihad and was granted the title Amir al-jaish ("Commander of the Army") in the lands near Bauchi on the Bornu frontier. He immediately turned his attention to the walled town of Nafada, which submitted peacefully after a delegation of Fulani and Bolewa inhabitants invited him to rule over them. Leaving much of his following at Ribadu, he remained for about six years (c. 1804–1810) at Nafada.

During this period, Buba Yero launched a major expedition against the powerful neighbouring Bolewa state of Daniski (later the Fika Emirate). He also conquered the important Tera center of Bage and raided Tangale–Waja to the south of Ribadu. When the Sokoto jihad spread into Bornu, he provided substantial support to the jihadists, who briefly occupied the Bornu capital, Gazargamo, leading to the flight of its ruler Ahmad Alimi. He also made "excursions deep into Bornu territory, spreading terror and destruction, and creating countless refugees."

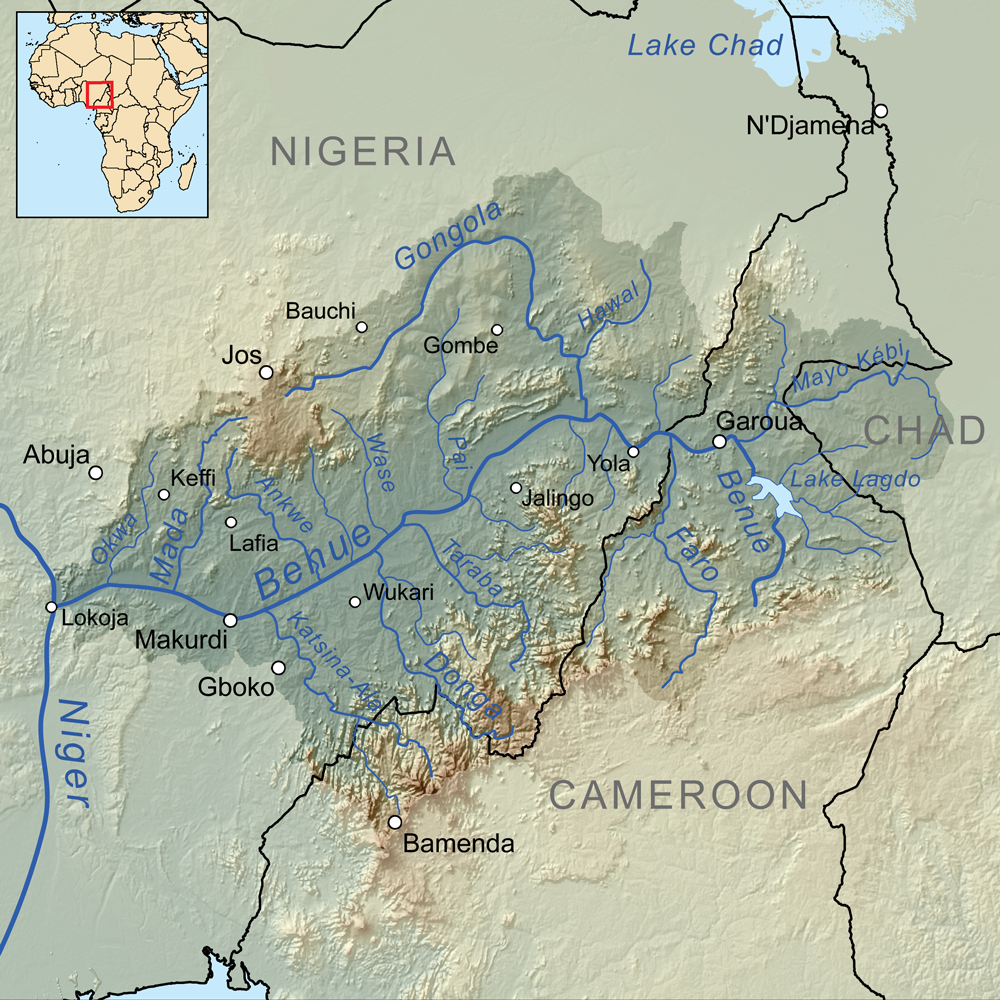
Map showing the Benue River basin

Under one of Buba Yero's lieutenants, Bauchi Gordi, his forces extended their control further into the Gongola Valley. Bauchi Gordi crossed the Yedseram and began a series of campaigns reaching as far east as Mayo Sancho. He then turned south, laying waste to the rich and populous plains of Mubi before advancing to Uba, where he defeated the Marghi chief Use-Urnda. He continued south to the Lala Plateau, where he was killed in battle, possibly against the Yungur.

In 1808, Buba Yero himself visited the valley and continued his campaign to subdue the various decentralised ethnic groups in the region. Leading a large force of cavalry and infantry, aided by local Fulani, he overran Marghi settlements as far east as Guider (in present-day Cameroon). During this campaign, he secured the peaceful submission of Ahmadu, chief of Maiha, and left scholars behind to teach Islam. From there, he advanced to the valley of the Tiel River and conquered the Fali of Bulmi before attacking the Batta of Demsa-pwa. During these campaigns, Buba Yero distributed subordinate flags, appointing no fewer than thirteen deputies, including several local Fulani clan leaders.

Around 1814, Buba Yero settled at the Bolewa town of Biri, located south of the Gongola River. Likely because the local chief was already Muslim, he did not oppose Buba Yero's decision to establish himself there. He is said to have encamped in Biri for about two years, probably as a brief pause to consolidate his gains before launching the next phase of his jihad.

From Biri, he marched against the weakened but still formidable Bolewa kingdom of Kalam. After a year or two of fighting, he moved westward and conquered all settlements under its chief (moi). Tradition holds that Buba Yero had originally come to Kalam as a mallam (Islamic scholar) before the jihad, possibly while traveling to or from Usman dan Fodio. During that earlier visit, he lodged with the brother of the local Fulani clan leader (ardo). Decades later, when he returned, he once again stayed there. Finding it difficult to capture Kalam by direct assault, he persuaded the chief to meet him outside the town for negotiations. When the chief left his walled settlement, Buba Yero's forces attacked and killed, scattered, or enslaved the chief's entire army.

Buba Yero then moved about eight miles from Kalam and established the fortified town of Dukku, which served as his headquarters for the next six years (c. 1818–1824). From Dukku, he exacted allegiance from all the Bolewa towns that had been under Kalam, as well as from the powerful Jukun (Kwararafa) state of Pindiga, within a radius of roughly thirty miles. Around 1824, he moved about eight miles farther south and founded his permanent capital at Gombe (later renamed Gombe Abba in his honour).

== Later life and death ==
By the time he moved to Gombe Abba, Buba Yero was about sixty years old and had been conducting his jihad for more than two decades. He soon retired from active campaigning, entrusting military operations to his sons Suleimanu and Muhammadu Kwairanga.

Sometime in the 1820s, Buba Yero came into serious conflict with Yakubu, the first Emir of Bauchi, over the boundaries of their respective emirates. They eventually appealed to Caliph Muhammad Bello of Sokoto, Usman dan Fodio's son and successor, who ordered them both to leave their palaces on the same day and make the point where they met the common frontier. On receiving the message, Yakubu set out immediately and reached the Gongola before the message arrived in Gombe. When the message finally reached Gombe, Buba Yero quickly dispatched his son Suleimanu with a strong force to intercept the Bauchi army. A pitched battle ensued on the left bank of the river, in which Yakubu routed Buba Yero's troops. Sokoto then sent representatives to demarcate the inter-emirate boundary, leaving a number of Jukun and Bolewa towns divided between the two territories.

During his campaigns in the Middle Benue region, Buba Yero had been recalled north by Usman dan Fodio, leaving his lieutenant Hamma Ruwa in charge. Hamma Ruwa went on to conquer much of what later became the Emirate of Muri by 1817. In 1833, when Buba Yero was about eighty years old, he became anxious to ensure his son Kwairanga would succeed him as emir. He feared that Gombe's electoral council might instead choose Hamma Ruwa, who, although enjoying great autonomy in Muri, still recognised Gombe's authority. Buba Yero summoned Hamma Ruwa and his eldest son Bose to a conference in Gombe, where he had them executed upon arrival on grounds of failing to render sufficient obedience. To resolve the matter, Caliph Bello declared Muri independent of Gombe.

Buba Yero never formally adopted the title of emir, preferring instead to be addressed as modibbo, a Fulani title honouring a learned scholar. He died at his capital in 1841 and was succeeded by his son Suleimanu.

== Family ==
Not much is known about Buba Yero's wives. A tradition relates how he met and married two of them. When he set out for Gobir to study under Usman dan Fodio, he reportedly stopped at Daura, where the local chief gave him his daughter Hawa in marriage. Other sources claim she was actually from Kano. He continued on to Katsina, where he married Zulai, the daughter of the local chief.

During Buba Yero's early campaigns, Zulai is said to have given birth to Suleimanu at Shani (Biu). From there, they moved to Gulani, where Hawa gave birth to Muhammadu Kwairanga. He had another son, Mallam Buba, who lived at Ribadu. He did not engage in military affairs, and was a full-time scholar and teacher.
