= Bubayero's Tomb =

Nigerian Tourist Centre

Bubayero's Tomb is one of the monumental and tourist centres in Gombe State. It is the grave of the founding father of Gombe, Abubakar dan Usman Subande, popularly known as Bubayero. The tomb is located in Gombe Abba, the headquarters of Gombe during the reign of Sokoto Caliphate.

The tomb is located at the eastern part of Gombe Abba where the former Emir's palaces used to be. It is in between walled structure accessible through two entrances. The edifice that houses the tomb is always under lock and key. Though, the site is always open to tourists and visitors who occasionally visit the place from within and outside the state, to offer prayers to the deceased monarch.
