= Gombe Abba historical town =

Gombe Abba
- Historic town
- Gombe Abba
- Country: Nigeria
- State: Gombe State
- Local Government Area: Dukku
- Founded: c. 1824

Gombe Abba is a historical town under Gombe State, Nigeria. It was located on Dukku local government, and it plays much role on history of Gombe Emirate. During the 19th century, Gombe Abba served as the headquarters of the Gombe Emirate and residence of their rulers before the emirate's headquarters were moved to Nafada and to the present city Gombe.

== History ==
Gombe Abba was established in 19th century during the formation of Gombe Emirate which developed as part of the expansion of the influence of Sokoto Caliphate into the Gongola region. Buba Yero, also known as Modibbo Gombe, was a follower of Usman dan Fodio and the founder of the Gombe Emirate.

== See also ==
- Gombe Emirate
- Buba Yero
- Gombe State
- Tomb of Buba Yero
- Sokoto Caliphate
