= Modibo Adama =

Modibbo Adama
- Lamido Fombina (Lord of the South)
- Reign: 1806–1847
- Predecessor: position established
- Successor: Muhammadu Lawal ɓii Adama
- Born: 1779; Wuro Chekke
- Died: 1847 (aged 67–68); Yola
- Burial: Hubbaare Modibbo Adama in Gurin, Fufore
- Wives: Asta Jam; Yasebo; Mammare; Jahra (Yara)
- Issue: 14 Children: Lauwal, Usman, Mansur, Umaru, Fadimatu, Addo Gurin, Hauwa'u, Hamidu, Bakari, Haliru, Zubairu, Aliyu, Hamman, Sani and Bobbo Ahmadu.
Names
- Adama ɓii Ardo Hassana
- Dynasty: Adamawa Emirate
- Father: Ardo Hassana

Adama ɓii Ardo Hassana (1786 – 1847), more commonly known as Modibbo Adama (Modibbo meaning "learned man"), was a Fulani scholar from the Yillaga (Yirlaɓe) clan. He led a jihad into the region of Fombina (in modern-day Cameroon and Nigeria) and established the emirate of Fombina, also known as Adamawa.

Modibbo Adama received a flag from Shehu Usman dan Fodio to lead a jihad in Fombina ('southlands') during the Sokoto revolution. Fombina later became one of the largest and most complex emirates in Usman's Sokoto Caliphate. It spanned about forty thousand square miles that covered parts of northeastern Nigeria, entire northern Cameroon and parts of Central African Republic.

== Early life ==
Modibbo Adama was born in 1779 in Wuro Chekke, located in what is now Adamawa state. He was described as being "lean and of tall stature, his features sharp and somewhat disfigured by small-pox, his nose slightly curved." His father, Modibbo Hassana, held the position of Arɗo, a clan leader. Adama's upbringing was deeply rooted in Islam, as his father, a Muslim, provided him with religious education until he was eleven years old. Recognizing the limitations of available Islamic education in the region, Adama was sent away to continue his studies and was accompanied by Hamman Song, a Bolaro of the Wolarɓe Fulɓe.

Under the tutelage of Shehu Muhammad Tahir in Baghirmi, Adama's focus was primarily on studying the Quran. He later moved to Birnin Ngazargamo, the capital of the Bornu empire, where he sought guidance from the renowned scholar Mallam Kiari. Adama immersed himself in his studies under Kiari's guidance for about a decade, absorbing a wide range of Islamic teachings and principles.

Upon returning to Wuro Chekke, Adama was met with the news of his father's death during a local conflict involving the Fulbe and Bata communities. Adama left Wuro Chekke not long after receiving the news and joined the Ba'en Fulbe in the Faro valley. The Ba'en were led by an Islamic scholar called Ardo Hamman, also known as Modibbo Hamman, who was highly respected and considered one of the prominent Ardo'en in the Benue-Faro valley. Recognizing the need for the spread of Islamic teachings and the religious development of the local Fulbe community, both Adama and Modibbo Hamman intensified their efforts in this regard. Their dedication to learning and devotion earned them a reputation for their piety and knowledge throughout the upper Benue region.

== Jihad ==
=== Adama's mandate ===
The news of Usman dan Fodio's Sokoto jihad, initiated in 1804, eventually reached the Fulbe community in Fombina. This was primarily due to the activities of influential jihadists such as Buba Yero and Bauchi Gordi, who were actively expanding their control over neighboring territories in the Gongola valley. Their military campaigns and conquests served as a conduit for information about the unfolding Sokoto jihad. Furthermore, the Fulbe migrants who had fled the regions affected by the jihadists' advancements, particularly from Bornu, played a crucial role in disseminating news about the Sokoto jihad. These individuals, seeking refuge from the conflict, carried with them tales of the unfolding events and the growing influence of Usman dan Fodio's movement. As a result of these combined factors—jihadist activities near Fombina and the accounts of those who had experienced the impact of the Sokoto jihad—the news of this religious and political movement gradually reached and resonated with parts of the Muslim Fulbe community of Fombina.

In 1809, the Ardo'en of the Fombina Fulbe clans held a meeting in Guringa to reach a decision on how to approach the situation. After much deliberation, the leaders agreed on a course of action and chose to send a delegation to Sokoto, where Shehu Usman was based, seeking his guidance. Modibbo Adama was chosen to lead this delegation as he was seen as a learned man who was neutral among the Ardo'en and had no desire for political power nor interest in politics. The delegation embarked on the journey that took several months and finally reached the Shehu in Sokoto. They conveyed their message to him, explaining the situation in Fombina and seeking his counsel. After reviewing the situation, Uthman instructed them to launch the jihad in Fombina. Furthermore, he chose Adama as the leader, appointing him Lamido Fombina ('Lord of the South'). The reason for Uthman's decision to pick Adama, according to a manuscript dated March 1809 in Yola, was:

...since you tell me that some of the fulani leaders did not come with you, but they sent you to come and receive the flag of the jihad from me and take it back to them. I instruct you to tell them that it is you to whom I have given this jihad flag, and tell them that who ever obeys you obeys me, and whoever swears fealty to you, it is exactly as if he had sworn fealty to me.

Shehu Usman's instructions to Modibbo Adama were comprehensive and far-reaching. He directed Adama to propagate Islam across the Fombina region and to distribute jihad flags among the various Ardo'en to carry out the mission of spreading the faith among the Fulbe and pagan peoples. Adama's role extended beyond local leadership; he was designated as a liaison between the Ardo'en and the central authority in Sokoto.

In addition to his leadership responsibilities, Usman emphasized to Adama the importance of anticipating the coming of the Mahdi. Usman believed that the Mahdi would emerge from the east and urged Adama to be vigilant for signs of his appearance. This emphasis on the Mahdi's coming was significant in the broader context of the Sokoto Caliphate's longevity. Usman had prophesied that the caliphate's reign would last only until the arrival of the Mahdi, within a span of a hundred years. This notion was deeply ingrained in the Sokoto leadership's mindset, and subsequent Lamibe Fombina were entrusted with the task of monitoring the signs of the Mahdi's appearance. Sultan Bello (second Sultan of Sokoto) further requested Adama to send spies to "south of Wadai and the south of Fur in the direction of the Nile River" so that the people of the caliphate, on the Mahdi's appearance, could "follow him and give him the oath of allegiance." This made Fombina an important region to the Sokoto government and likely influenced Usman's decision to appoint Adama as Lamido as he needed a trustworthy scholar who could spot the signs of the Mahdi and regularly update him on the happenings in the region.

=== Early campaigns ===
Adama immediately began recruiting Fulani and Hausa volunteers and mercenaries. These were mainly mounted cavalrymen fighting with sword, bow, and poisoned arrow. Adama forbade them to pillage or to kill indiscriminately, but enemy nations were given two choices: convert to Islam or become a tributary state. Those ethnic groups that lacked a centralised government had but one: become slaves or convert to Islam.

The non-Fulani Muslims of the Adamawa largely rejected Adama's jihad; they viewed it as little more than an excuse to spread Fulani hegemony. However, it was primarily the Fulani leaders (ardo'en, singular: ardo) of Fumbina with whom Adama was concerned. Some of them rejected his primacy for various reasons: He was from a fairly humble background, he owned little wealth, his army was still small, and he lacked charisma. The majority, however, welcomed Adama as a military commander or religious leader at the very least. Adama's son-in-law, Jauro Dembo, had already settled in Fumbina at Malabu and became one of his lieutenants.

The makeshift army made headquarters at Gurin, a fort at the junction of the Faro and Benue Rivers where Fulani warriors had regrouped after fighting the Bata in 1803. Adama then led his forces in a series of strikes on Bata settlements such as Pema, Tepa, and Turuwa. The victories elated Adama's men, who took numerous Bata slaves. It was during these battles that Adama received the news that his father was killed by the Bata on the Beti River. Modibbo Adama's force continued their battles against Bata and Lala peoples as far as the Gongola River, where he met the Lamido of Gombe, Buba Yero. The two joined forces and fought back the Yanguru, Hona and Kibba peoples. The two forces eventually stopped and both went homewards.

The early successes convinced more local Fulani leaders to come to Adama's side. Even those ardo'en who opposed his political rule recognised the jihad as an opportunity to expand their territories. Njobdi of the Wollarbe clan is one notable example, and his major rival, Hammam Sambo, perhaps the first ardo to have settled in Fumbina, proved the major holdout. Bitter relations between Njobdi and Hammam would prove a major obstacle in Adama's quest to maintain a cohesive empire.

In addition, common Fulani were inspired by Adama's exploits and formed into bands. Adama created a new position for their leaders: The lamido (plural: lamibe), who was the leader of a particular territory, as opposed to an ardo, leader of a particular people. Both groups received flags of command and shared the same status in Adama's armies. Before his death, Adama would appoint over 40 non-ardo lamibe. They would prove his most loyal lieutenants.

=== Mandara campaign ===
Adama turned his attentions on the only major state in Fumbina that could present a threat to his fledgling emirate: Mandara. It was an attractive target. It lay between Bornu to the north and Baghirmi in the Chad Basin, so its fall would facilitate the conquest of these areas. Its people were already Muslim, though they mixed the religion with pagan practices. Moreover, it had a large population from whom soldiers could be conscripted, and it was renowned for its excellent horses. Mandara was well organised, however, and would not be an easy prize. The people who lived there, the Mandarawa, had a long-standing rivalry with the Fulani, who had fought them under the Bornu in previous years. This animosity only served to drive more Fulani to Adama's armies, though, as many veterans were eager for another crack at an old rival. Furthermore, Fulbe rulers Modibo Damraka and others were already embroiled in fighting against the Mandara in the Diamaré Plain.

Adama reached Guringa in 1809 with a large army in good morale. He quickly conquered the Mandara settlement at Guider and headed north, taking several more villages along the way. Outside of the Mandara capital, Dulo, Adama demanded that the king, Bukar Djiama, swear his allegiance and convert to Islam untainted with paganism. Bukar agreed to acknowledged Adama's right to rule his own subjects, but he refused to yield his own sovereignty. Adama and his men took Dulo with little fighting.

Adama searched for someone to rule the settlement, but he found no one whom he felt adequate for the post. Meanwhile, his troops revelled in their plunder. No one expected the Mandara counterattack, which was launched from nearby Mora. Adama fled the town.

== Administration ==
Adama and his men retreated to Yola (in present-day Nigeria). The town would become his capital by 1841. From here, he and his lieutenants continued to expand the emirate, which he named Adamawa after himself. The subordinates had to send him tribute in the form of cattle. Large settlements such as Maroua, Garoua, and Ngaoundéré fell to Adama or his lieutenants. By 1825, the Fulani had penetrated the Adamawa Plateau. Nevertheless, Adama lived in relatively moderate surroundings and never acquired great wealth.

From Yola, Adama began the administrative tasks necessary for his nascent state. He did this with Usman's advice; he was to foster understanding between his people and their governors, facilitate communication between elders and their subordinates, and prevent the stratification of society based on class or wealth. The empire eventually took on three administrative tiers. At the centre was the emir al-Mu'minin ("commander of the faithful"), Adama himself, ruling from Yola and answering only to Usman dan Fodio in Sokoto. A contingent of councillors and administrators directly aided him, and a household staff of non-Fulbe and slaves doubled as his bodyguard. Below him were a number of district leaders, the lamibe (singular: lamido), who ruled key settlements. Under them were a number of villages, each headed by a village chief.

Meanwhile, some of the older ardo'en grew powerful through their own conquests. They regarded the unconquered areas near their territories as their own private backyards and defended these zones from all comers. This sometimes surfaced in their relations with Adama, such as when Bouba Njida of Rai refused to come to Adama's aid when the emir was fighting the Namchi at Poli. Instead, Bouba waited for Adama to retreat from the area to bring in his own forces and finish the enemy off. He then sent prisoners from the battle to Adama as a gift.

Preceded by none	Lamido of Adamawa; 1806–1847	Succeeded by Muhammadu Lawal bi Adama

== Legacy ==
Adama died in 1847 and was laid to rest at Yola (his tomb survives to this day). Adamawa covered 103,000 km^{2} from Lake Chad to Banyo and was inhabited by 1,500,000 people. Further expansion to the south had proved difficult and undesirable since the presence of the tsetse fly and thick jungle made cattle rearing difficult there.

Adama's son Muhammadu Lawal succeeded him after a brief regency under Hamidu bi Adama. Eventually, three of Adama's other sons would at some point serve as Lamido of Adamawa. Not until the British and German colonial periods would the emirate come to an end.

Despite their loss of independence, the Fulani were now the preeminent ethnic group of Northern Cameroon. They spread Islam throughout the region, establishing it as the dominant religion. Education also flourished, as new converts learned Arabic writing and studied the Qur'an. Trade flourished, and communications with it. The conquests were also important ecologically. Lands that had once been used for cultivation now became part of Fulani pastureland. Herdsmen cut down trees to make way for cattle, and they burned grasses that their herds later trampled. Centuries of such behaviour have replaced the region's forest with savanna.

Ironically, the Adamawa was more sparsely populated after Adama's conquest. Rather than fight the Fulani invaders, many peoples fled, displacing others in turn. The Adamawa Plateau, once home to many of Cameroon's ethnic groups, soon became a pastureland, and the forest zone of Cameroon became more heavily populated.

== Personal life ==
=== Wives ===
Adama had four wives Astajam, Yasebo, Mammare, and Yara.

==== Yasebo ====
Yasebo was Adama's second wife and the daughter of Modibbo Hamman Gurin. They married shortly after Adama was appointed Lamido, with the union intended to strengthen the bond between Adama and Hamman Gurin, as well as their respective clans, Yillaga'en and Ba'en. According to custom, Yasebo was expected to be submissive to Adama and respect the hierarchy of the harem. However, likely due to her royal lineage and the fact that Gurin, her father's domain, was still the capital of Adamawa at the time, Yasebo resisted these expectations.

This resistance created tension in her relationship with Adama, which eventually collapsed after an incident in which she refused to let him enter her hut, leaving him standing in the rain. This incident likely influenced Adama's decision to move his capital to Ribadu in that same year, leaving Yasebo and Hamman behind.

Yasebo had two sons with Adama, Hamidu and Bakari. Some traditions in Yola claim that Adama excluded all descendants of Yasebo from the succession due to their strained relationship. However, this is likely a false rumor fabricated by supporters of Sanda to discredit Hamidu during the succession crisis of 1847. Despite this, two of Yasebo's descendants eventually became Lamido: Muhammad Bello (r. 1924–1928) and Yerima Ahmadu (r. 1946–1953).

==== Yara ====
Yara, a Marghi woman, was the last wife of Adama. She was the mother of two Lamidos, Zubeiru (r. 1890–1901) and Bobbo Ahmadu (r. 1901–1909).

=== Personality ===
Adama was known for his ascetic lifestyle, reportedly sometimes going an entire week without eating. Despite being appointed Lamido, Adama never fully embraced the title, preferring instead to be called modibbo, an honorific Fulani title for scholars. He supported himself by making and selling ropes. Hugh Clapperton, a British explorer, described witnessing a meeting between the Caliph of Sokoto Muhammad Bello, and the various emirs of the Caliphate, noting that Adama was the most modestly dressed among them.

=== Physical description ===
Adama was said to have been "lean and of tall stature, his features sharp and somewhat disfigured by small-pox, his nose slightly curved."

== Notes ==
- DeLancey, Mark W., and DeLancey, Mark Dike (2000): Historical Dictionary of the Republic of Cameroon (3rd ed.). Lanham, Maryland: The Scarecrow Press.
- Fanso, V. G. (1989). Cameroon History for Secondary Schools and Colleges, Vol. 1: From Prehistoric Times to the Nineteenth Century. Hong Kong: Macmillan Education Ltd.
- Johnston, H. A. S. (1967): The Fulani Empire of Sokoto. Chapter 8: "The Jihad in Adamawa and Bauchi". London: Oxford University Press.
- Ngoh, Victor Julius (1996): History of Cameroon Since 1800. Limbe: Presbook.
- Njeuma, Martin Z. (1990): "The lamidates of northern Cameroon, 1800–1894", Introduction to the History of Cameroon in the Nineteenth and Twentieth Centuries. Palgrave MacMillan.
