= Waja people =

Ethnic groups in Gombe, Nigeria

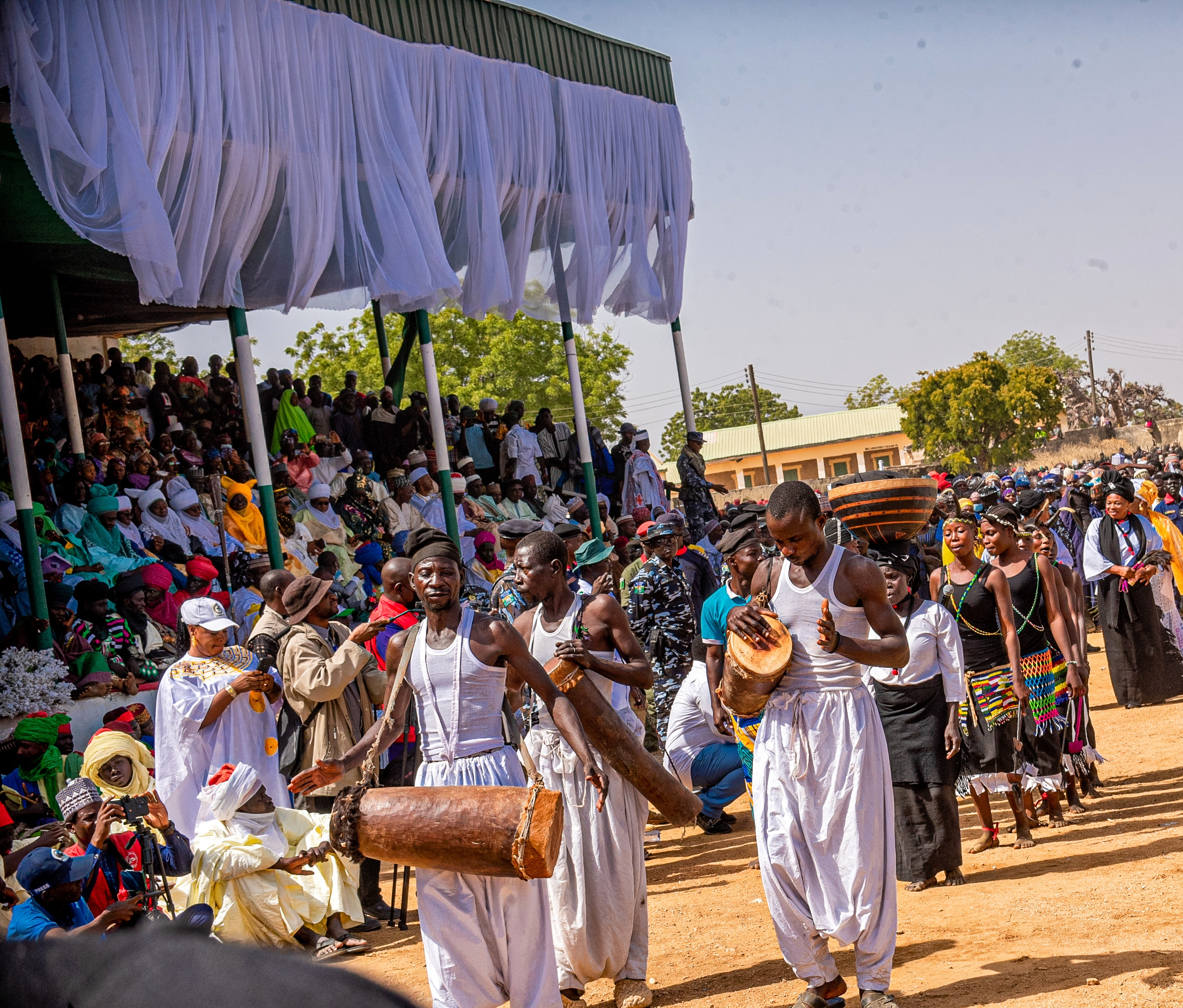
- Waja traditional festival

Languages
- Waja language

Religion
- Islam; Christianity

The Waja people are one of the ethnic groups in Gombe area of Nigeria that were the early inhabitants of the region. They inhabited the east-southern corner of Gombe state, occupying the present Balanga local government area of the state. The Waja people are the occupants of the Waja district which spread over an area of 330 square miles (850 km^{2}).

== History ==
Waja are believed to have come from the Shani area, under their leader Bala Amnasha. However, the conflicts with the Kanuri necessitated the movement of Waja into Gombe area. After that, they dispersed to the various locations they presently occupied, such as Dala-Waja, Tallese, Dong, Reme, Gelengu, Bangu and other hamlets.

An alternative theory promoted by C. D. Bala is that the Waja migrated from Yemen, crossing the Red Sea, passing through Egypt and Sudan to Ngazargamu and later to Kukawa in Borno, where they had a long stay. They later moved on from Kukawa and settled at Shani. At Shani, there was a power tussle between the Derwo and the Wiyya on the position of the leader. The Derwo then moved out of Shani and settled at Degri, and the Wiyya moved to Dala hill. This division created the plain and the hill Haja.

== Types of Waja ==
Waja people are of two types: the hill Waja and the plane Waja, because of their settlements. The hill Waja moved to the hills because of the Fulani Jihadists.

== The cousin tribes ==
The two tribes Lugunda and Waja are linked together by a road. The Lugunda are majorly located at the Guyuk local government area of Adamawa state and Waja people are predominant in the Balanga local government area of Gombe state although both can claim citizenship of both states. The two tribes are commonly referred to as cousins as they have similar culture and the relationship is boosted by intermarriage.

== Socioeconomic and political system ==
The socio-economic and political organisation of the Waja people was tied to their village lineages. Their belief system is around the Jukun tsafi Kuru, believe in the Supreme Being, that controlled every aspect of the Waja life. The existence of Waja chief priest is to mediate between the people and the various gods and the Kuru.

== Language ==
Cultural dancing

Waja are speakers of Adamawa-ubangy of Kwa family of languages. The language is very close to Tera and Bolewa. They also observed a number of rituals and practices similar to that of the Tera and Bolewa people.

The Waja people have eight discrete languages most of which are noun class languages. Three of them (Dadiya, Maa, and Yebu) have almost completely lost their noun class morphology.

== Leadership positions ==
Alhaji Mohammed Danjuma is the fifth Bala waja of Talase after the death of his father who ruled for 43 years.

The first female chief of Waja is Finney David, who obtained the title 'Jakadyar Waja' due to her contribution to the state.

== Occupation ==
The Waja are agriculturists and industrialists who engaged in pottery and blacksmithing. They engaged in peasant farming in the colonial era, mostly farming groundnuts and cotton which led to the early establishment of a market in the area by the colonial rulers.
