= Muhammad Banaru Abubakar =

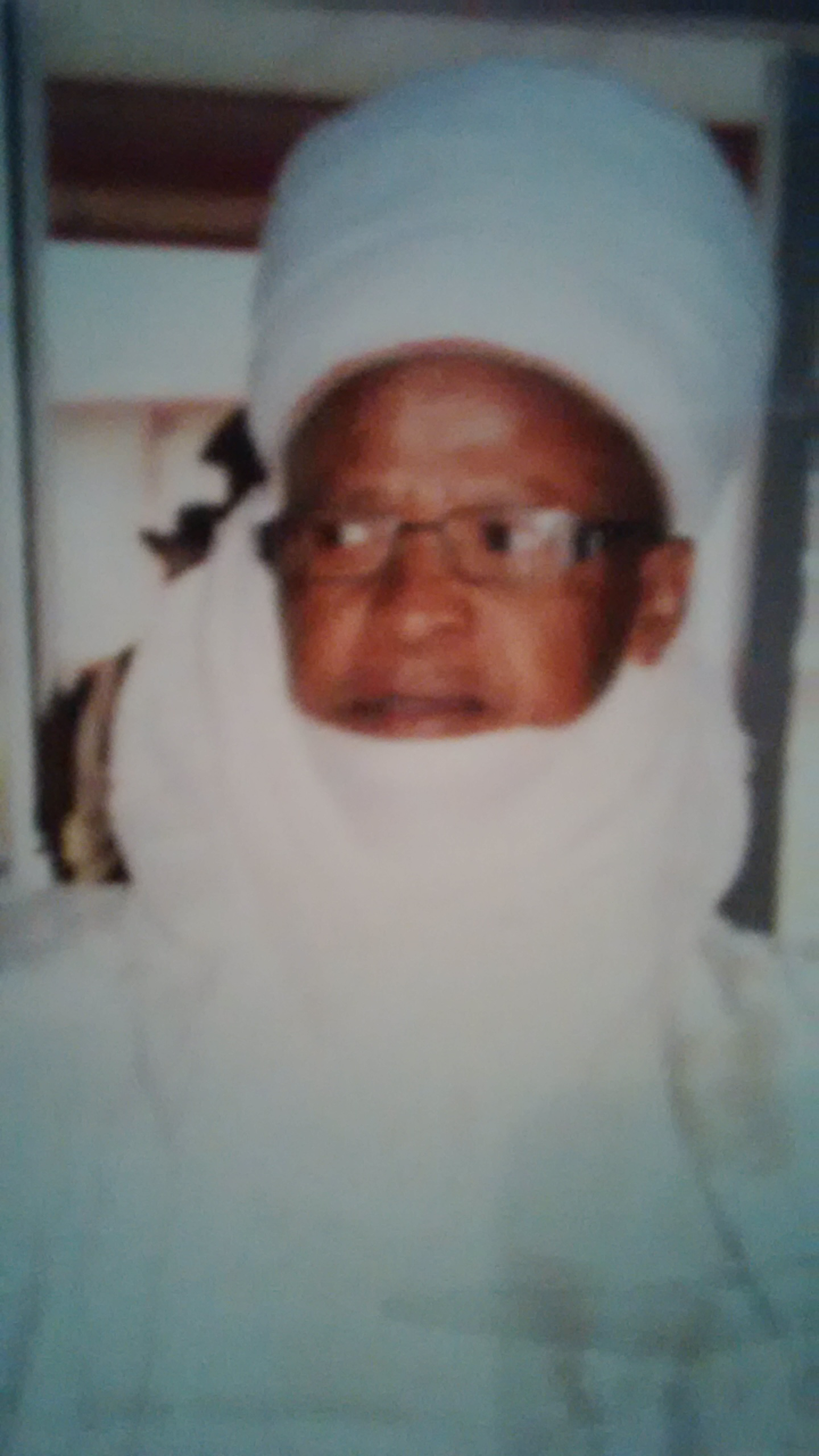

Muhammad Banaru Abubakar (Barayan Gombe) (October, 1939 to November, 2015) was a Nigerian Administrator and public servant.

He died on the evening of Saturday, November 21, 2015.

He was from Akko LGA in Gombe state, he traversed all spheres of civil service retiring as a permanent secretary in the old Bauchi state government.

Born in 1939 at Kumo in present-day Akko LGA, Abubakar attended Kumo Elementary and Gombe senior primary schools between 1948 and 1955, he then proceeded to Bauchi provincial school where he obtained West African School Certificate in 1960.

His quest for further knowledge took him to Obafemi Awolowo University, Ile Ife, Osun state earning a certificate in Public Administration in 1977. Earlier between 1961 and 1962, he was at school for Arabic studies, now Abdullahi Bayero College for Arabic Studies, Kano.

He attended many other certification courses including, Certificate in Modern Management at Ahmadu Bello University Zaria, (1977), Certificate of Service; Reportorial Corps, Federated Press, Kano (1964), Citizenship and Leadership certificate, Sea School Lagos, (1979), implementation of 1988 civil service reforms amongst others.

He began working as a roving reporter federated press Kano in 1964 Collating news in lower courts.

Same year, 1964 he joined the defunct Northern Nigerian Government in the executive cadre, he served in various ministries. Later in 1968, he was deployed to North-Eastern state government serving in various capacities including staff officer military governor's office.

Abubakar was appointed Sole administrator Ningi LGA and later Katagum between 1985 and 1986. He rose to the rank of permanent secretary in 1988 in the old Bauchi state. Abubakar held other political appointments both at state and federal levels including Federal Commissioner, Federal Character Commission.

He was conferred with the traditional title of Barayan Gombe, by the Gombe emirate council in the year 1990.

Muhammad Banaru died evening of Saturday, 21 November 2015 at the age of 76.
