= Abubakar Shehu-Abubakar =

Nigerian traditional leader (born 1977)

His Royal Highness Alhaji Abubakar Shehu-Abubakar
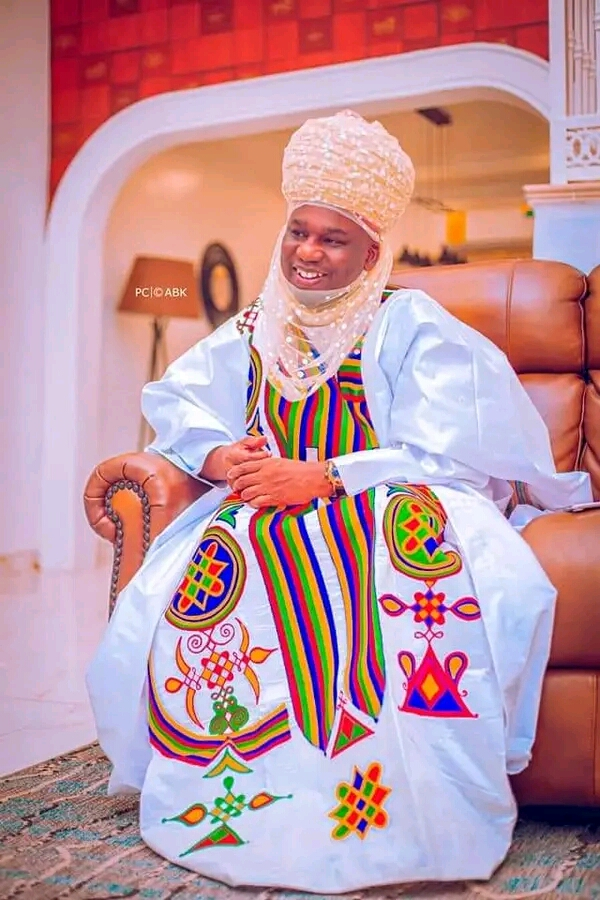
- Born: 17 December 1977 (age 48); Gombe, Nigeria
- Education: University of Maiduguri
- Occupation: Emir of Gombe
- Predecessor: Shehu Abubakar, 10th Emir of Gombe

Abubakar Shehu-Abubakar CFR (born 17 December 1977, Gombe, Nigeria) is a Nigerian traditional leader who was appointed the 11th Emir of Gombe in June 2014. He became Emir following the death of his father, Shehu Abubakar, the 10th emir, who died on 27 May 2014. Abubakar Shehu-Abubakar III is Shehu Abubakar's second son. He was also named sarkin Daban Nigeria. He is also called by names Like Giwa, Uban Kasa, Ɗawisu, and Abba Jikan Abba.

== Early life and education ==
Abubakar Shehu-Abubakar was born in Gombe, Nigeria. He attended Gombe Children Primary School from 1982 to 1988 and the Government Science Secondary School, Gombe, from 1989 until 1995. Shehu-Abubakar received his bachelor's degree in political science from University of Maiduguri, where he was a student from 2001 until his graduation in 2005.

== Career ==
Abubakar served as a Supervisory Councillor on the Gombe Local Government Council from 2006 to 2007. From 2007 until 2009, he worked as the personal assistant to the Director of Administration at the federal Nigerian Ministry of Defence in Abuja. He later became the chairman of Kliptown Lagoon Nigeria Ltd. And the executive director of Horizon Interlinks Global Resources.

Shehu-Abubakar's father, the 10th Emir of Gombe, Shehu Abubakar, died of cancer in London on 27 May 2014. He was appointed as Shehu Abubakar's successor in early June 2014. The Secretary to the Gombe State Government (SSG), Abubakar Bage, presented Shehu-Abubakar with his letter of appointment at the Gombe Central Mosque on 6 June 2014. A coronation will take place.

== Awards ==
In October 2022, a Nigerian national honor of Commander of the Order of the Federal Republic (CFR) was conferred on him by President Muhammadu Buhari.

== See also ==
- Gombe State
- Nigerian Ministry of Defence
