= Tera people =

Ethnic group in Nigeria

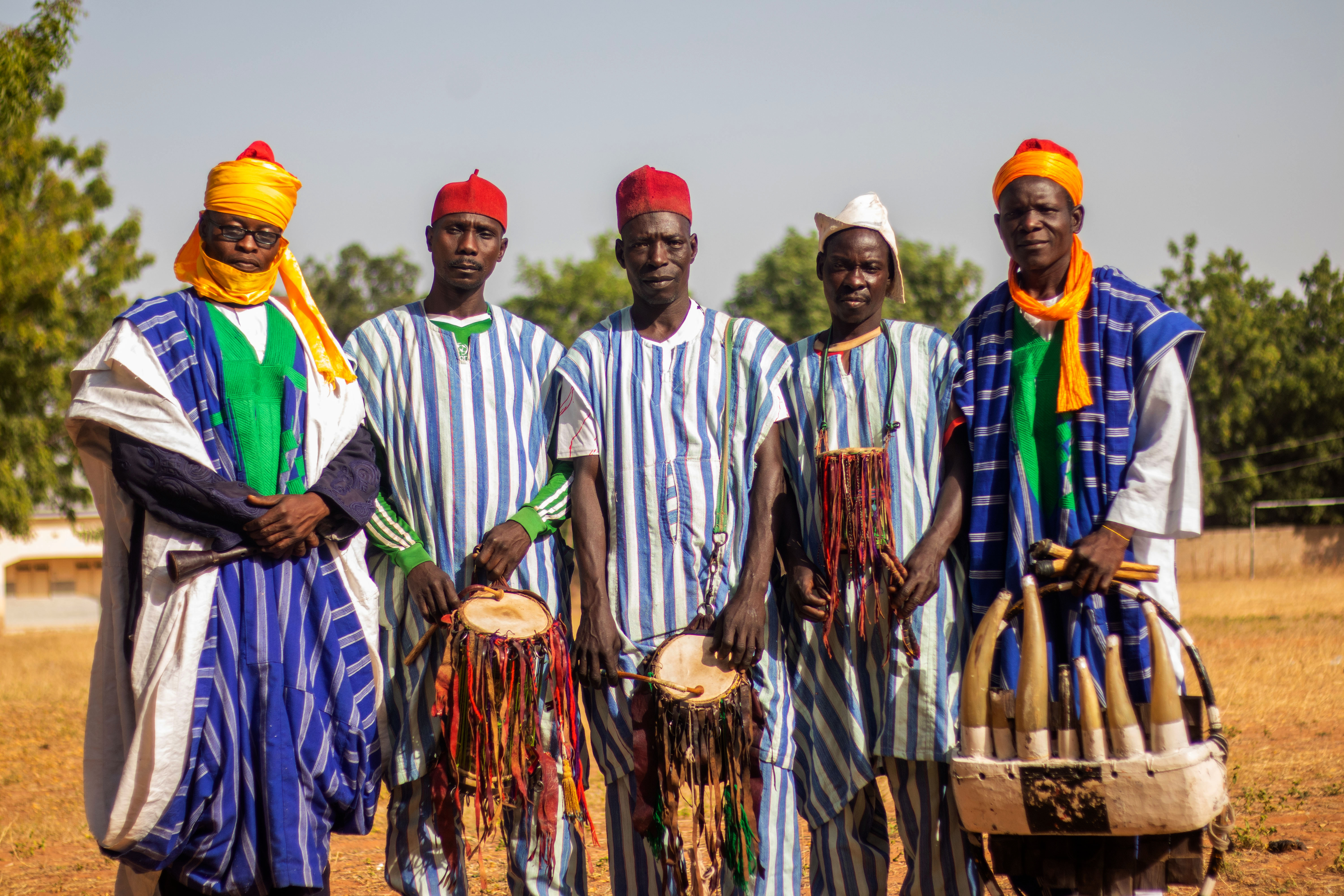
Tera natives

The Tera people are an ethnic group that make up the early inhabitants of the Gombe area prior to the 18th century. Presently, Tera people are mostly found in the east of the present day Gombe emirate.

== History ==
The Tera people left [Yemen] and moved into Borno area around the Chad basin, where they settled for years but due to political crisis. The Tera people left the Chad Basin area with Jukun into Gombe area, probably around 900-1000AD. More so, some groups of Tera speakers believed that they left Chad Basin when the Kanuri's were transferring their capital from Kanem to Ngarzargamu in ca.1484, under Mai Ali Gaji. After that, the Tera proceeded west to their present location, passing through Babur and Bura areas before coming into Gombe area

In addition, the Tera people were among the early occupants of Gombe area before the establishment of Gombe Emirate, they occupied settlements at the banks of River Gongola, such as Gwani, Hinna, Liji, Kalshingi, Zambuk, Bage, Kurba, Doho, Deba etc.

== Occupation ==
Traditionally, the Tera people are hunters and farmers.

== Culture ==
The Tera people known for their tribal marks similar to that practised by other ethnic groups of Gombe state. Also, they have similar artistic festivities with the Bolewa People, Waja and Jukuns neighbours. They also observed the same cult, particularly, believing in Gwando the rain-making god.

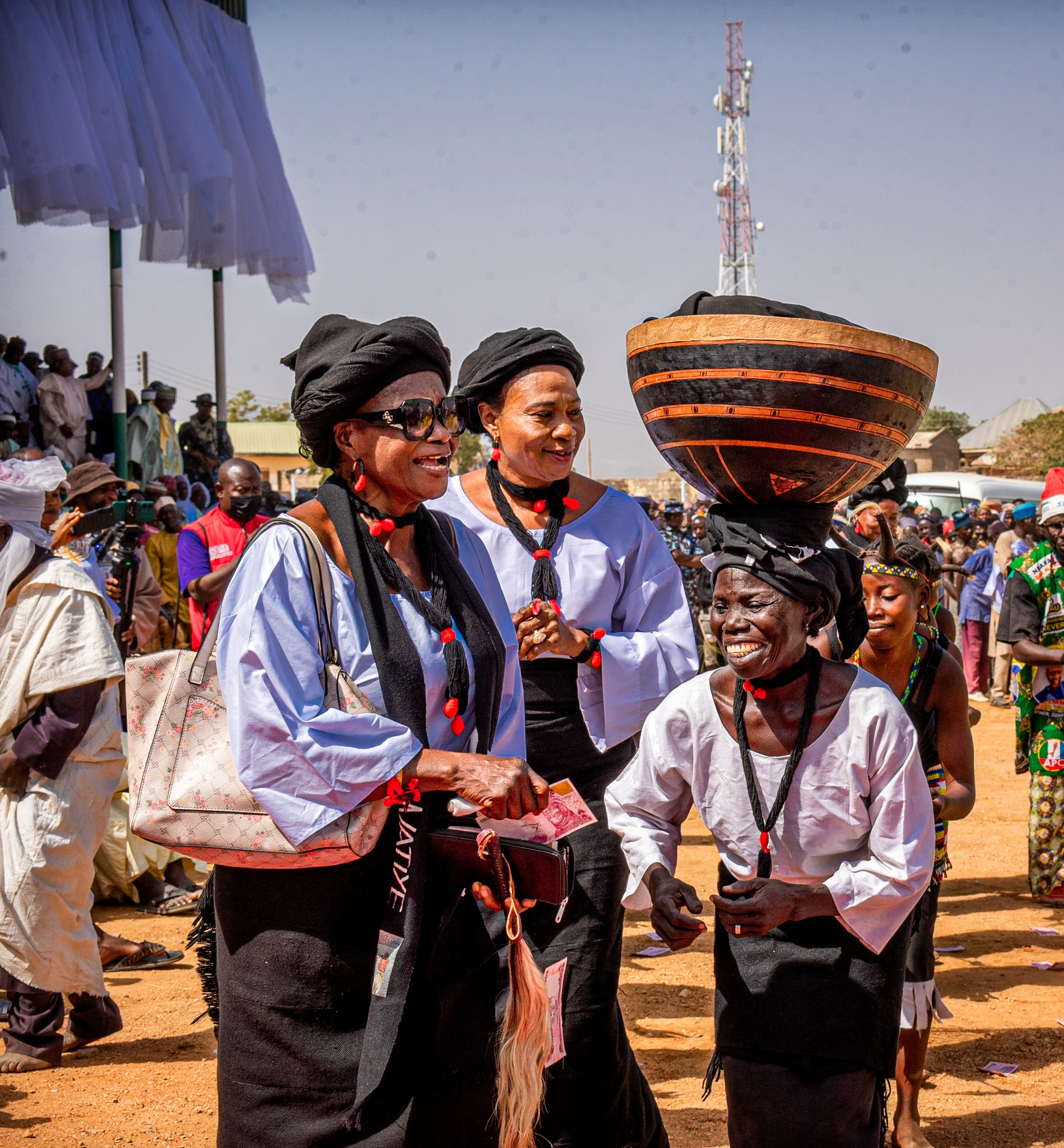
Traditional festival.

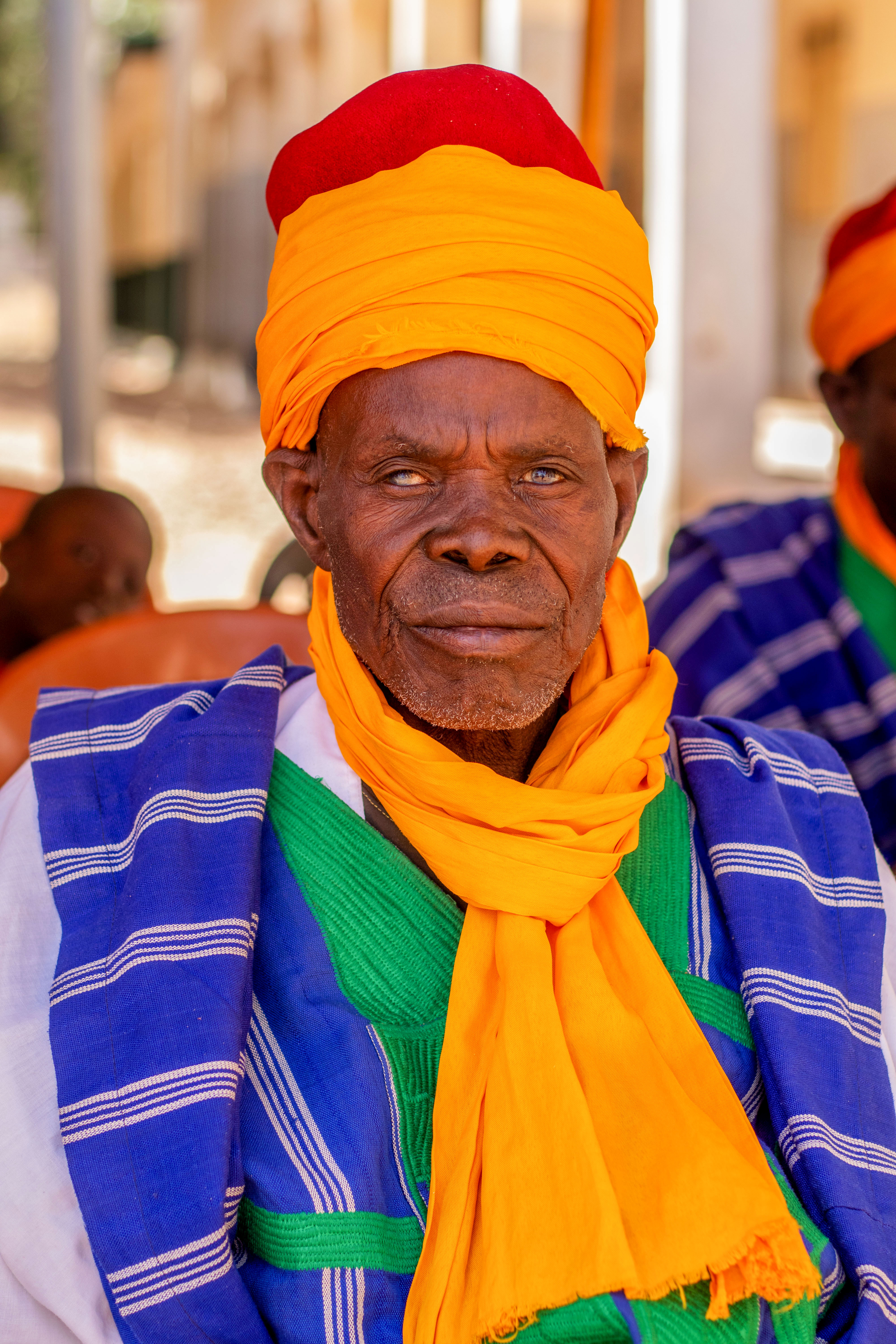
Portrait of a Tera man.

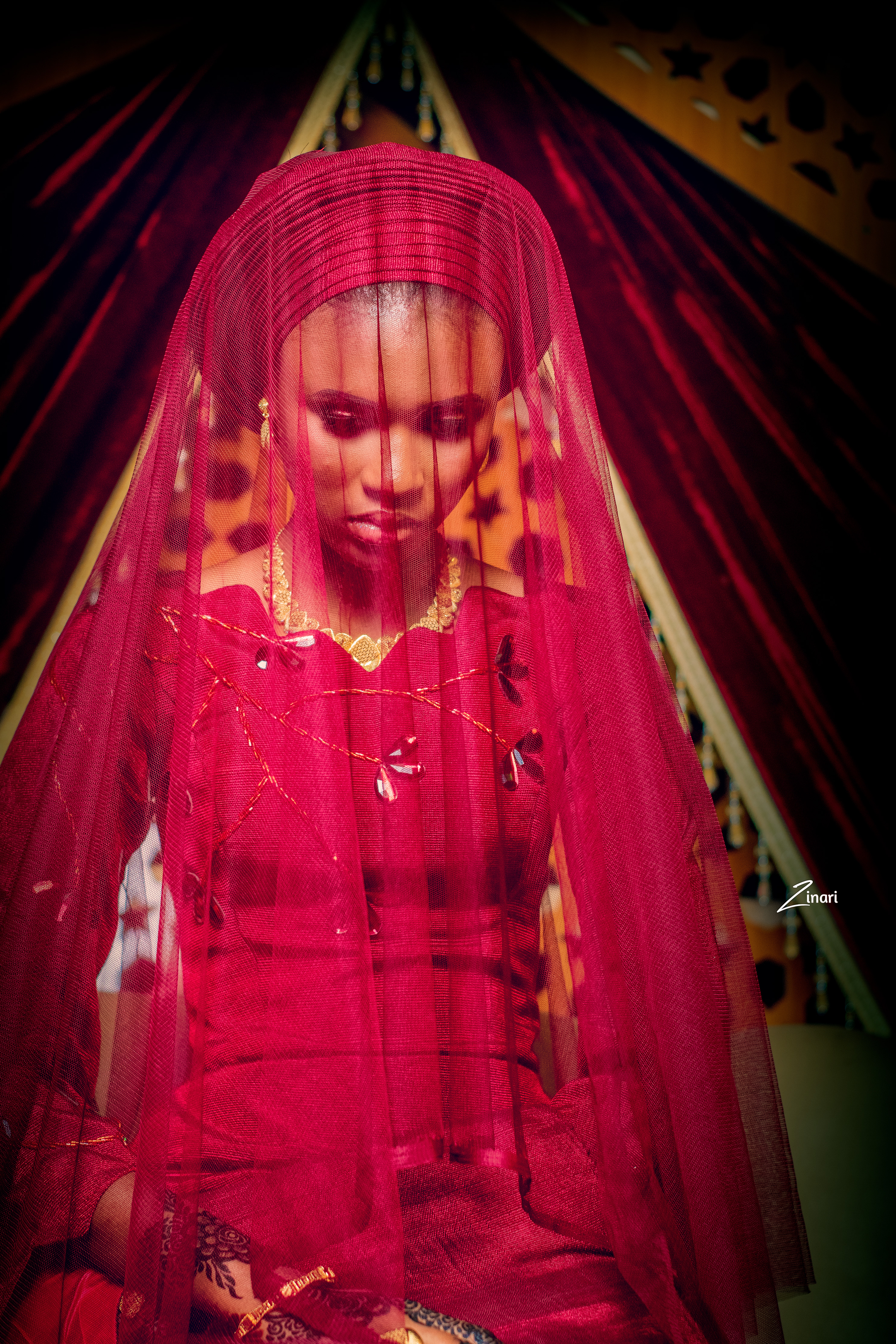
A bride.

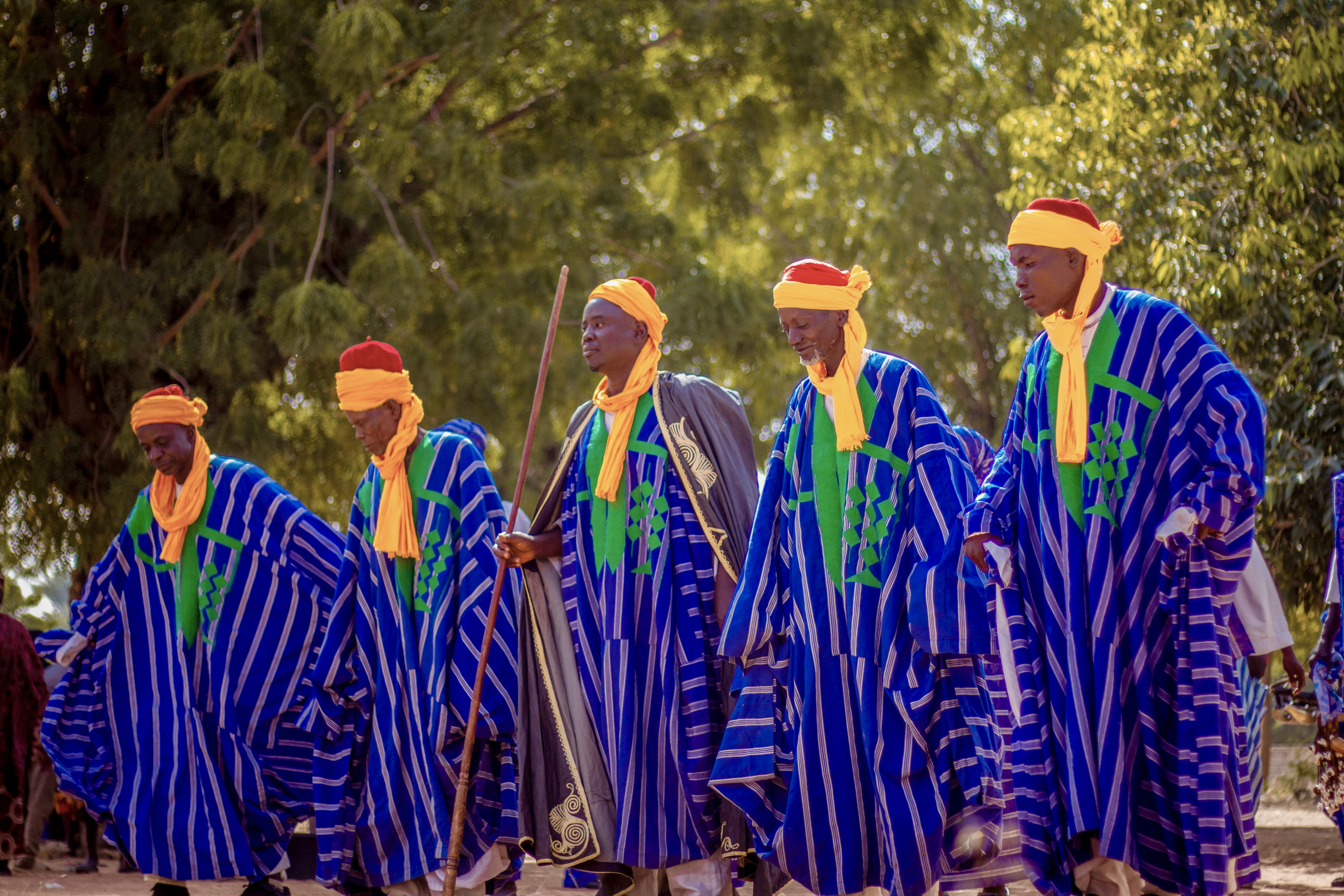
Native dancers.

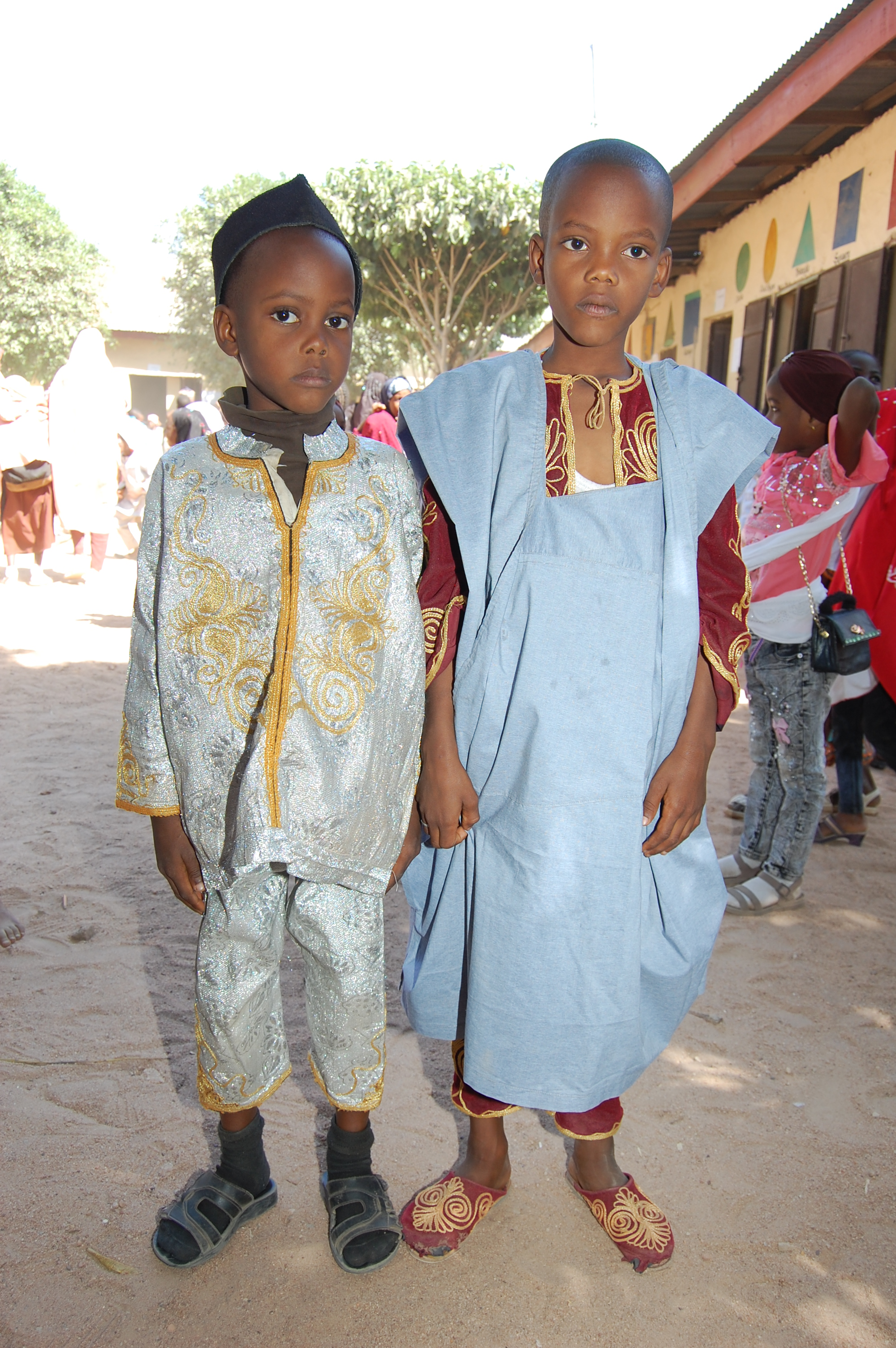
Cultural dressing.

== See also ==
- Gombe State
- Gombe Emirate
- Gombe

== Language ==
Tera people speak Tera language.
