= Jibril Gaini =

Nigerian Mahdism preacher (d. 1904)

Jibril Gaini (d. 1904) was a Mahdism preacher who lived during the reign of Emir Zailani (1882–1888) of Gombe Emirate. He was a Mahdist leader, a religious zealot who managed to establish himself at Burmi on the border between Gombe and Fika. During these periods, a wave of revolutionary Mahdism was swept through western emirates of Sokoto and eastern emirate of Gombe. Gaini managed to withstand for years against the combined forces of Gombe and the Sokoto Caliphate, and was finally defeated and exiled by the British Colonial forces in 1902. He was exiled to Lokoja, where he apparently died in 1904.
