= Shehu Abubakar =

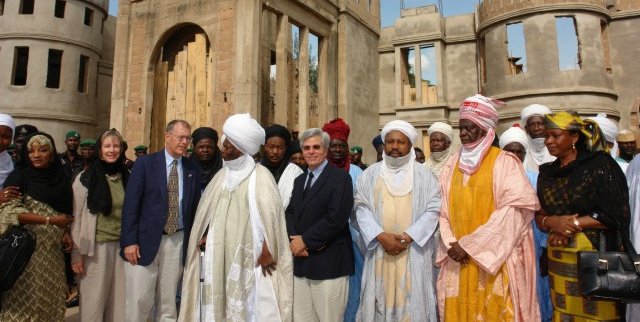
- Emir Shehu Usman Abubakar (center left) receives U.S. Embassy Charge' d’Affaire Robert E. Gribbin (center right) outside the emir's palace in Gombe, Nigeria, in 2007

Emir of Gombe
- Reign: January 1984 - May 2014
- Coronation: January 1984
- Predecessor: Mallam Abubakar Umar
- Successor: Abubakar Shehu-Abubakar
- Born: 3 March 1938; Gombe, British Nigeria
- Died: 27 May 2014 (aged 75–76); London, England, United Kingdom
- Burial: Nigeria

Shehu Usman Abubakar (3 March 1938 – 27 May 2014) was a Nigerian traditional leader who served as the 10th Emir of Gombe from January 1984 until his death in May 2014. Abubakar Led the creation of Gombe State, one of Nigeria's 36 states, in 1996. He was also the Chairman of the Council of Emirs and Chiefs since 1984.

== Early life and education ==
Abubakar was born in the Doma area of Gombe in 1938. He was the fifth son of the 9th Emir of Gombe, Mallam Abubakar Umar. He attended Elementary School and Bauchi Middle School. Abubakar graduated from the Barewa College, Zaria, secondary school in 1966.

== Career ==
Abubakar began his professional career at the former Gombe Native Authority as an engineering assistant. He then worked at the Technical Training Centre, Kaduna Institute of Administration. Abubakar also joined the staff of two former northern Nigerian state governments: the former North-Eastern State government and the government of the now-defunct Bauchi State, where he became the Permanent Secretary of Parastatals, Local governments, Animals, Forestry and Establishment.

He also served as the permanent secretary and two-time member of the National Universities Commission (NUC).

== Personal life ==
Emir Shehu Abubakar died at Royal Marsden Hospital, Fulham Road, London, where he had been undergoing treatment for cancer, on May 27, 2014, at the age of 76. He was buried on the grounds of the Gombe palace.

The late Shehu Abubakar's son, Abubakar Shehu-Abubakar, was appointed as the new Emir of Gombe in early June 2014.

== See also ==
- Governor of Gombe
