= Aishatu Jibril Dukku =

Nigerian politician

House of Representatives Federal Republic of Nigeria
- Incumbent
- Assumed office July 2015

Minister of Education
- In office 2007–2010

Personal details
- Born: 18 December 1963 (age 62) Kaduna
- Party: All Progressive Congress (APC)
- Relations: Married
- Education: Bayero University
- Occupation: Politician
- Profession: Educationist

Aishatu Jibril Dukku (born 18 December 1963) is a Nigerian educationist and politician from Gombe State. She was a former Principal of Federal Government Girl's College, Bajoga, Gombe State. She served as Federal Minister of State for Education during the presidency of the late Umaru Musa Yar' Adua. Since then, she has served as two terms member of the Nigerian National Assembly. She served in the 8th and 9th Assemblies of the Nigerian House of Representatives representing Dukku and Nafada Federal constituency, Gombe State, Nigeria from 2019 to 2023 and was succeeded by Abdullahi El-Rasheed and preceded by Aishatu Jibril Dukku. She was the chairman of the House of Representatives Committee on Electoral and Political Parties. She was defeated in the 2023 House of Representatives elections in her reelection bid.

== Early life and education ==
Aishatu Jibril Dukku, known as 'Mama Shatu', was born in Kaduna in Northern Nigeria and is an indigene of Dukku Local Government Area of Gombe State, Nigeria. She completed her primary education at the Central Primary School, Gombe, from 1970 to 1976. She completed her secondary education at the Federal Government Girls' College, Bauchi from 1976 to 1982, and obtained her General Certificate of Examinations (GCE). She holds a Bachelor of Arts degree in education from the Bayero University, Kano. She lives with her husband, Jamalu Arabi, in their residence at Abuja quarters, Gombe.

== Educational career ==
Dukku started her working career as a classroom teacher in 1987. In February 1988, the Bauchi State Government appointed her as the English language teacher at the Government Girls' Science Secondary School, Doma, Gombe State. In 1990, she was appointed as the Vice Principal (Academic) of Pilot Junior Secondary School, Gombe. From 1990 to 1994, she was seconded to the Ministry of Education, Bauchi and served as the Vice Principal (Academic) at the Government Girls' Science Secondary School, Doma, Gombe State from 1994 to 1996. In 1997, she was appointed as the first principal of the Government Day Secondary School, Gandu, and the pioneer principal of the Federal Government Girls' College, Bajoga, Gombe state from May 1999 to March 2006. From March 2006 – May 2007, she served as the Federal Inspector of Education, Federal Ministry of Education, Federal Inspectorate Service, Gombe. The Late President Musa Yar' Adua appointed her as the Honourable Minister of State for Education, Federal Republic of Nigeria and she held the position from 26 July 2007 until 17 March 2010.

== Political career ==
Dukku contested the 2015 general elections in Nigeria and she was voted into power to represent Dukku/Nafada Federal constituency of Gombe state in the House of Representatives. She chaired the House of Representatives Committee on Electoral Matters and Political Parties Affairs. And she was a member of the board of trustees of the All Progressive Congress (APC). The All Progressive Congress (APC) in Gombe State was declared by the Independent National Electoral Commission (INEC) to have won all the National Assembly seats. Hajiya Aishatu Jibril Dukku won the election in Dukku/Nafada Federal Constituency. Aishatu focuses her legislative interest on the education of the girl child, women and youth empowerment, and poverty alleviation and skills acquisition. She is committed to the establishment of schools, skills acquisition centres, scholarship programs for the youth and other similar projects.

Dukku as the chairman, House of Representatives Committee on Electoral and Political Parties matters made case need for special consideration for Persons With Disabilities (PWD) during the 2019 general elections. Lead Nigerian's calls for the extension of the CVR period and calls for ensuring adequate security for the 2023 elections.

== Awards and honours ==
Dukku has received awards from governmental and non-governmental organisations. And she currently holds the traditional title of Gimbiyar Dukku and Jakadiyar Dass ta Farko. She has widely attended local and international seminars, workshops and conferences.

== Publications ==
Aishatu has two publications: Attitude of Teachers towards the use of Reward and Punishment and The Girl-Child Education in Gombe North: Way Forward.
