= Bauchi Emirate =

Traditional state in Bauchi State, Nigeria

Bauchi Emirate: Masarautar Bauchi (Hausa); 𞤤𞤢𞤥𞤮𞤪𞤣𞤫 𞤦𞤢𞤵𞤷𞥅𞤭 (Fula)
- Flag

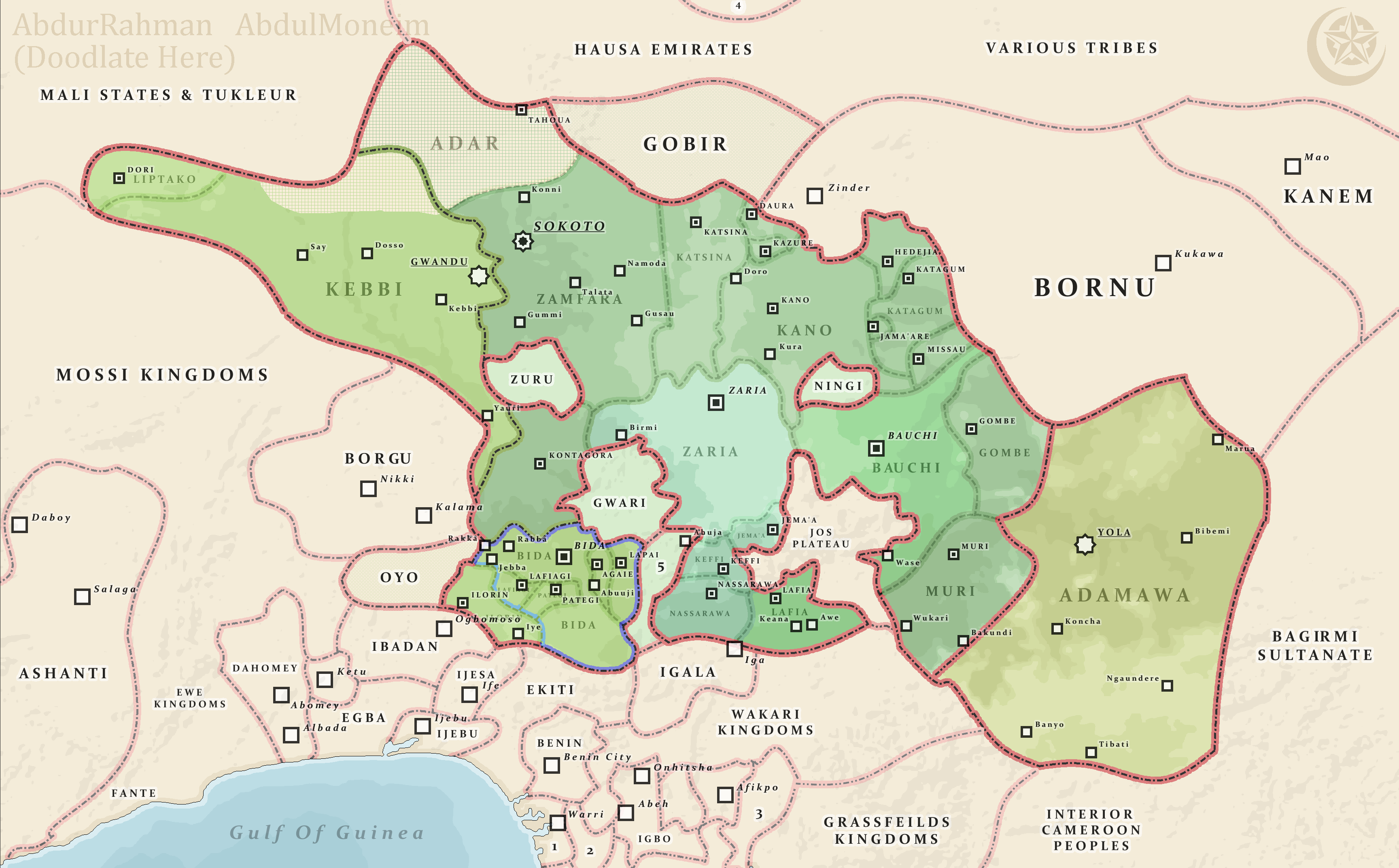
- Map of the Sokoto Caliphate in 1870.
- Status: Vassal of the Sokoto Caliphate
- Capital: Bauchi; 10°18′57″N 09°50′39″E
- Ethnic groups: Hausa; Fulani
- Religion: Islam
- Demonym: Dan Bauchi
- Government: Emirate
- Establishment: 1809
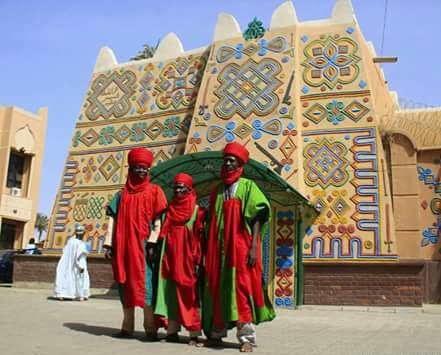
- Today part of: Bauchi State, Nigeria

The Bauchi Emirate (Fula: Lamorde Bauchi 𞤤𞤢𞤥𞤮𞤪𞤣𞤫 𞤦𞤢𞤵𞤷𞥅𞤭) was founded by Yaqubu dan Dadi in the early 19th century in what is now Bauchi State, Nigeria, with its capital in Bauchi. The emirate came under British "protection" in the colonial era, and is now denoted a traditional state.

== History ==
Before the Fulani jihad the Bauchi region was inhabited by a large number of small tribes, some of whom spoke languages related to Hausa, and some of whom were Muslims. The province of Bauchi was conquered between 1809 and 1818 by jihadists inspired by Usman dan Fodio's jihad in Sokoto and were led by a Hausa Islamic scholar, Yakubu. Yakubu was the only definite non-Fulani ruler in the Sokoto Caliphate. He was a student of Usman dan Fodio prior to the start of the jihad.

=== Civil War ===
In 1881, the emirate experienced a bloody civil war which was brought about by the then emir, Ibrahima dan Yaqubu, who stepped down in favor of his son Usman. This decision was highly unpopular, especially among Yakubu's other sons. War eventually broke out when Salih, the Emir of Missau, tried to march towards the capital to support Usman as 'internal forces' seemed to be in favour of Halilu dan Yaqubu to be Emir, but was stopped by the rural population enroute there.

The war brought about the deaths of all of Yaqubu's sons except the ex Emir Ibrahima and one Aliyu Garga. Halilu was captured and executed, along with his supporters, primarily mallamai who endorsed him on account of his learning. Many people fled the town to avoid the destruction and enslavement carried out by the Missau forces during and after the civil war. Numerous refugees sought safety in neighboring emirates like Muri and Gombe.

==== Aftermath ====
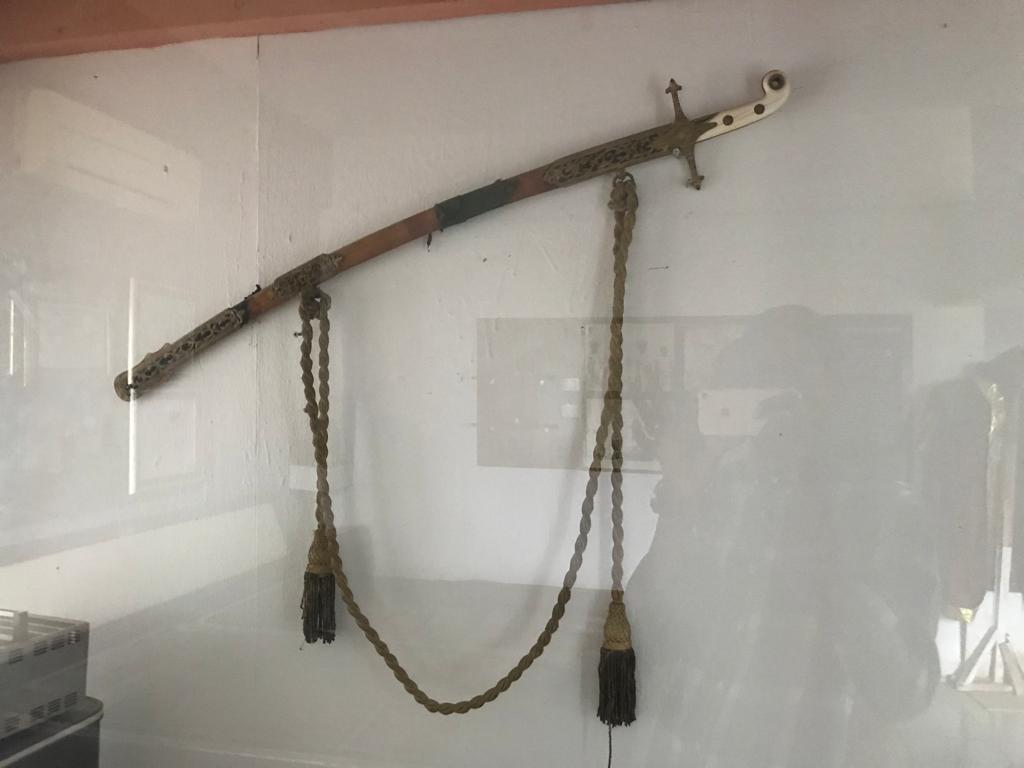
A sabre used in the emirate. From the Bauchi State Museum.

The manner with which Usman and his allies acted during the civil war further deepened the animosity the survivors of the war had on him and alienated the people who had initially supported him. This resentment continued even during the mid 1880s. Sarkin Musulmi Mu'azu approved Ibrahima's abdication but died shortly after. After repeated complaints from influential figures in Bauchi, his successor Umaru bin Ali ordered Usman to Sokoto and formerly dethroned and detained him there. To replace him, Umaru appointed Umaru dan Salamanu, a grandson of Yaqubu who had remained neutral during the conflict, as Bauchi's new Emir.

The reign of Umaru was that of reconciliation between all those affected by the war. He rehabilitated the sons and brothers of those who had suffered a loss of position or property, welcomed back refugees who had fled, and secured the release of those enslaved by the Missau forces. Additionally, Umaru compensated Usman's brothers by appointing his younger brother Muallayidi to the important role of Chiroma, the heir apparent.

=== Reign of Umaru ===
Umaru aimed to strengthen the emirate's weakened central government following the conflict. While most districts were peacefully brought under control, force was used with the more resistant districts. He also took measures to contain the constant raids by Ningi, which also increased during the period of instability. However, this approach faced opposition from defiant district chiefs, resulting in their swift dismissal if they resisted Umaru's directives.

In 1900, Umaru moved to depose and detain Gwaram's chief, Muhammad Lawal. Lawal resisted, claiming insufficient grounds for his removal. Umaru's ground for this attempt was that the chief refused to hand over to him for enslavement a group of families who had migrated to Gwaram from Fali when they were still not Muslims. This group of families, however, had since embraced Islam and had intermarried with the people of Gwaram and thereby legally immune from enslavement.

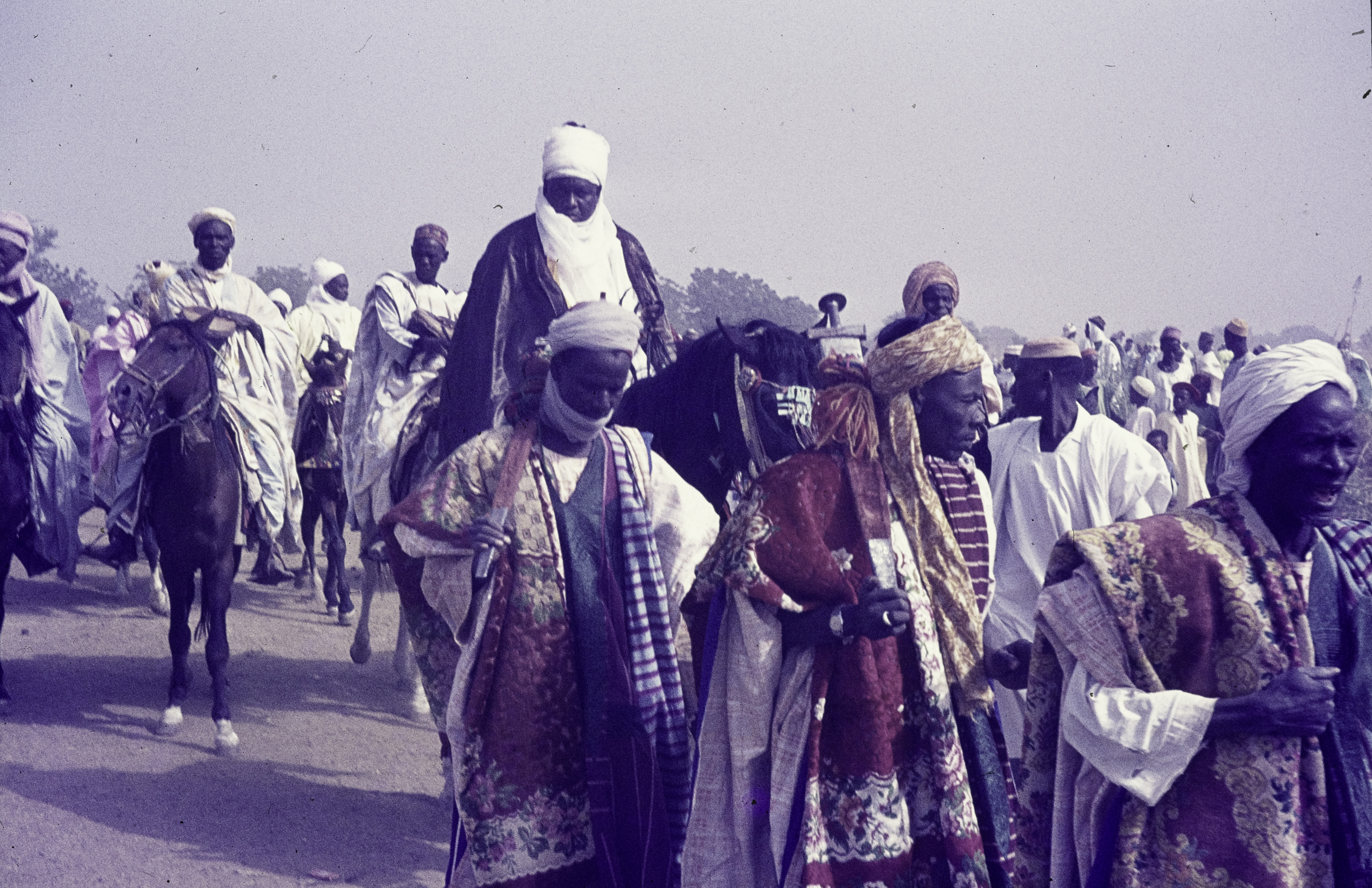

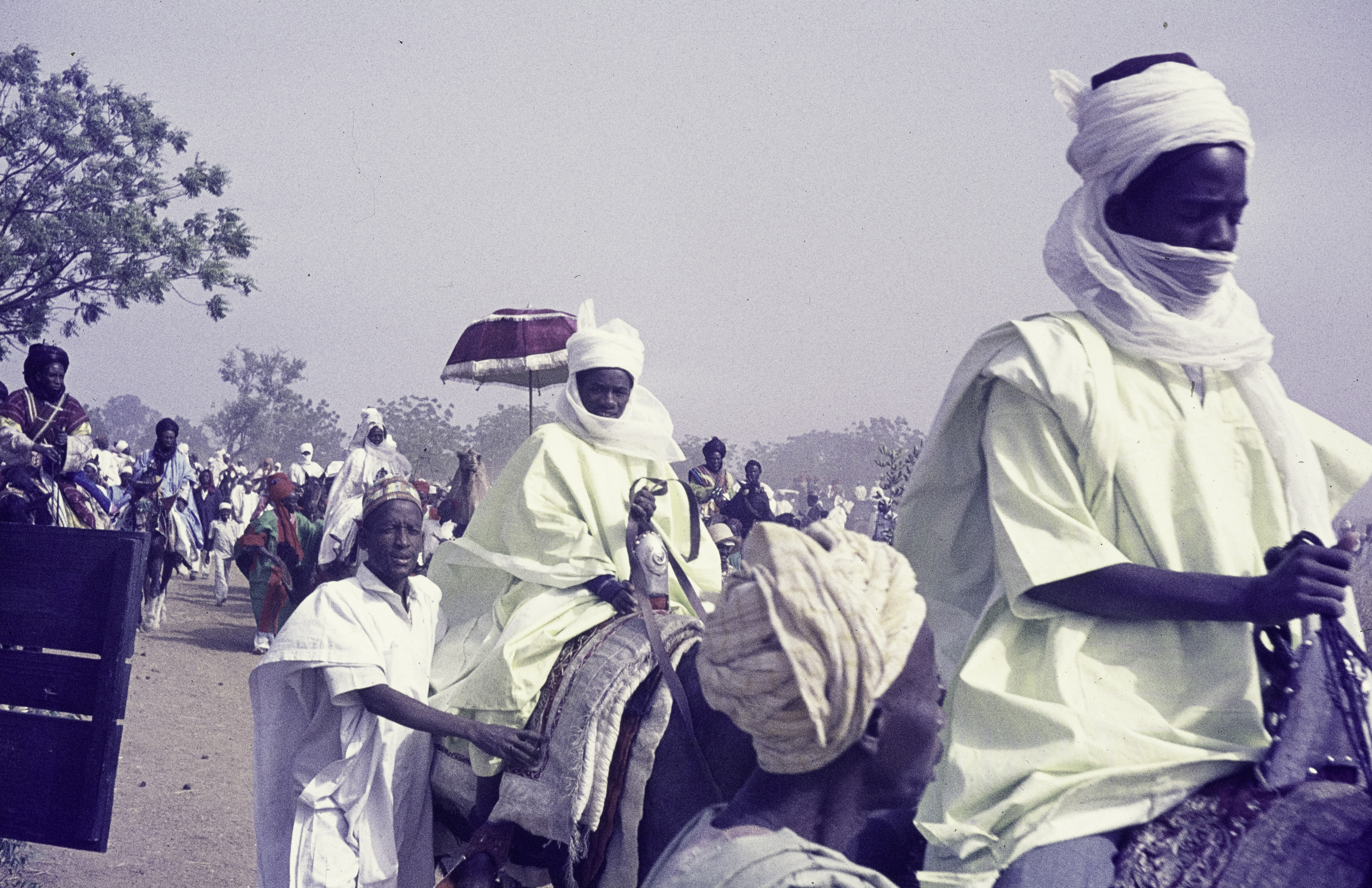
Sallah festival celebrated in Bauchi.

Branding Lawal a rebel, Umaru led an expedition against Gwaram, facing strong public backlash. Despite the seven month siege against the district, he failed to capture Gwaram, mainly because most of his troops merely pretended to fight. The Emir of Missau, Muhammadu Manga threatened to fight alongside Lawal. To buy him off, Umaru promised him the "all the wealth in Gwaram" once it was successfully sieged. Lawal's father-in-law, the Emir of Jama'are, successfully persuaded him to capitulate arguing that the worst that could happen was deposition and the loss of property. Umaru swiftly executed Lawal despite receiving orders from Sarkin Musulmi Abdur Rahman Atiku to withdraw from Gwaram and pardon the chief. After Lawal's execution, the Emir of Missau was permitted to pillage the district, "capture all those he could, as many as nine thousand, and burn down the town."

Manga sent some of his booty to Umaru and the Emir of Jama'are. Umaru, to avert retaliation from Sokoto, sent some of his booty to Abdur Rahman, who immediately released them and sent a message to Bauchi, Kano and Missau ordering the immediate release of all the Gwaram captives. Despite this, Umaru's actions in the conflict worsened his popularity.

=== Fall ===
The emirate remained under the Caliphate until 1902 when a British expedition occupied the capital without fighting. The British abolished the slave trade, which had flourished until then, and appointed a new emir, who died a few months later. In 1904 the emir who had succeeded took the oath of allegiance to the British crown.

== Emirs ==
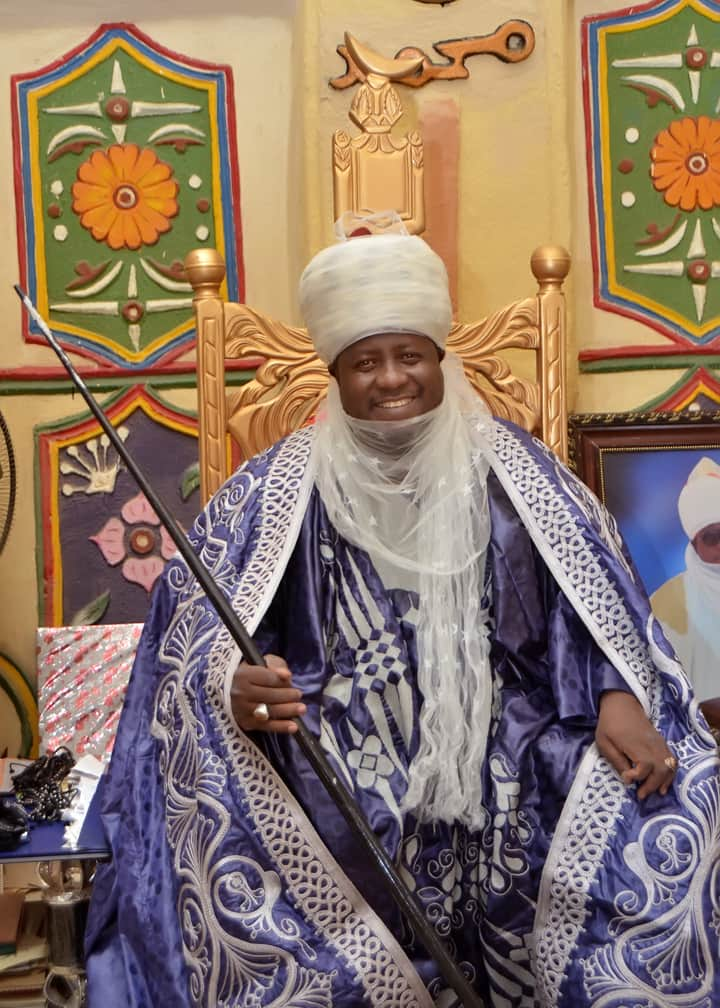
The current Emir of Bauchi

Rulers of the Bauchi state, titled Lamido, were:

Start	End	Ruler	Notes
1805	1845	Yaqubu I dan Dadi (b. 1753 - d. 1845)	
1845	1877	Ibrahima dan Yaqubu	son of Yaqubu. Abdicated in 1877
1877	1883	Usman dan Ibrahima	son of Ibrahima. Moved his court to Rauta. Deposed by the Sultan of Sokoto, Umaru bin Ali
1883	February 1902	Umaru dan Salamanu	grandson of Yaqubu. Deposed by British colonial forces and exiled to Lokoja and then to Ilorin
1902	1902	Muhammadu 'Mu'allayidi' dan Ibrahima (d. 1902)	son of Ibrahima
1903	1907	Hassan dan Mamudu (d. 1907)	grandson of Yaqubu
1907	1941	Yaqubu II dan Usman (d. 1941)	son of Usman
1941	28 September 1954	Yaqubu III dan Umaru (maje wase)	son of Umaru. Abdicated and retired to Wase
May 1955	1982	Adamu Jumba dan Yaqubu	son of Yaqubu III
27 July 1982	24 July 2010	Suleiman Adamu (d. 24 July 2010, aged 77)	son of Adamu
29 July 2010		Rilwanu Suleimanu Adamu (b. 1970)	son of Suleiman
