= Dukku =

Dukku Gombe Abba
- Town and LGA
- Nickname: Fulɓe
- Motto: Njanngen, nduren, ndemen
- Interactive map of Dukku
- Location in Nigeria
- Coordinates: 10°49′26″N 10°46′21″E
- Country: Nigeria
- State: Gombe State

Government
  - Local Government Chairman and The Emir of the Local Government Council: Adamu Muhammad Waziri
  - Lamido: Hrh Haruna Abdulkadir El-Rasheed

Area
  - Total: 3,815 km^{2} (1,473 sq mi)

Population (2006 census)
  - Total: 207,190
  - Density: 54.31/km^{2} (140.7/sq mi)
- Time zone: UTC+1 (WAT)
- 3-digit postal code prefix: 760
- ISO 3166 code: NG.GO.DU

Dukku is a town and Local Government Area in Gombe State, Nigeria. The Gongola River flows through the west and north of the LGA. It has an area of 3,815 km^{2} and a population of 207,190 from the 2006 census. The vast majority of the population are Muslims, but there is a Christian minority. The major ethnic group is Fulani with Fulfulde being spoken as a major language alongside Bole while Hausa, Kanuri, and Kare-Kare are also spoken.

The postal code of the town and area is 760.

The northeasterly line of equal latitude 14°N and longitude 14°E passes through the LGA about 6 km to the southeast of the town.

== History ==
The history of Dukku started in the 17th century when Arɗo Sammbo, a leader of Fulani clan and his people with their cattle migrated from Fuuta Jallon in Guinea and settled in the present location. Another oral tradition says that the head of the Fulbe was Arɗo Almoodo or Almuudo.

Before they finally settled in Dukku, being herders, they wandered around in search of pasture for their animals. They first inhabited in a settlement, according to oral tradition called Kamanei. But they didn't last there because of the tyranny of the king of Kamanei who had a randy male child that would go first to every bride on her bridal night. This custom didn't augur well with the Fulani who settled there, especially one of Arɗo Sambo's son, Yero Nanaro who took an oath that he would slay the prince when the latter came to his bride on their first night. And Yero lived to his promise by slaughtering the prince when he came to their bridal night.

This incident forced Arɗo Sammbo and his people to spontaneously leave Kamanei on that night and moved further south, nonstop for weeks until they got to a settlement in Bauchi State, where they divided into three, with one following Arɗo Sammbo or Almuudo moving west until they got to a place called Lumpaaso, some few miles away from present Dukku, at the bank of Gongola River, one of the tributaries of River Benue under the territory of a Bolewa Chief of Kalam named Moi Duja.

The Chief of Kalam, Moi Duja accorded them great hospitality by allowing them to settle in his territory. But no sooner had they settled in Lumpaaso than they realized that the place was not conducive for them with their animals as it was very close to the river which makes it difficult for cattle grazing. Thus they complained to the chief who in turned ordered one of his palace sentinels, Madaki Dishe, to show them a better and more convenient place in his territory, which is the present settlement of Dukku.

The name Dukku is a Fulfulde word. The town name was initially Dukku ƴori, a combination of Fulfulde word, Dukku (a command word for erecting a pole to which a cow is tethered) and Bolewa word, ƴori (it is okay), but later shortened to Dukku for convenience.

The town is the headquarters of Dukku Emirate created out of Gombe Emirate by the first civilian governor of Gombe State, Alhaji Abubakar Habu Hashidu in 2001

== Climate ==
The rainy season in Dukku is oppressive and cloudy, the dry season is partly cloudy, and it's hot all year round. The temperature rarely falls below 52 °F or rises over 106 °F throughout the year, often ranging from 57 °F to 102 °F.

=== Temperature ===
With an average daily high temperature of 98 °F (37 °C), the dry season lasts for 2.3 months, from March 1 to May 11. In Dukku, April is the hottest month of the year, with an average high of 101 °F (38 °C) and low of 75 °F.

A daily maximum temperature below 87 °F (31 °C) is typical during the 2.7-month of harmattan season which runs from July 12 to October 1. In Dukku, January is the coldest month of the year, with an average low of 58 °F (14 °C) and high of 90 °F.

=== 2024 Flood Impact in Dukku Local Government Area ===
During the 2024 rainy season, which extends from June to September, Dukku experienced flooding. This event resulted in damage to residential areas, agricultural land, and essential infrastructure. The floods affected individuals across multiple settlements within the LGA.

The agricultural sector, a primary livelihood source for residents, was impacted as farmlands were submerged by floodwaters. Food stocks experienced disruption, with about 75% partially damaged and 8% destroyed entirely.

Affected settlements within Dukku LGA included Hina, Dige, Kunde, Burari, Laÿya, Zange, and Dukkuyel, with Zange and Dukkuyel experiencing the largest numbers of affected people.

== Education ==
Schools in Dukku include;

1. Government Day Secondary School, Gombe, Hashid
2. Dukku Central Primary School
3. Safeena Primary School Dukku
4. Dukku Community Science Secondary School
5. Haruna Rashid College of health sciences and technology Dukku
6. Dukku International College of Health, Science and Technology
7. Gombe State University, Dukku Campus

== Site Attractions in Dukku ==
- The Kalam Hill
- The Gombe Aba Hill
- The Yautare Hill
- The Magnificence of the Emir's Palace
- Durbar Game [Royal horse raising]
- Dukku Local Markets
- Orphanage Homes
- Eid Celebrations etc

Kalam Hill is a 144-metre (157 yd) hill near Gabeiyari in Dukku Local Government Area, Gombe State, Nigeria. It is listed as a major attraction in Dukku LGA.

According to oral accounts from descendants of the pre-19th century community, the hill was inhabited by farmers, hunters, and potters whose ruler maintained a palace at the center peak. During the Sokoto Jihad in the early 1800s, forces under Usman Dan Fodio sent a letter demanding surrender. The ruler, after consulting his council, chose to capitulate to avoid bloodshed and met the soldiers peacefully when they surrounded the hill at night.

Local tradition states that a warrior in the community struck his iron spear into the rock at the summit in protest, leaving a hollow that remains visible today. Following the conquest, the inhabitants resettled at the base of the hill, contributing to the formation of villages in present-day Dukku.

Pottery fragments, both decorated and plain, have been recovered from the hillside. The site is recognized locally as a historical monument, and local guides can lead visitors to the spear hollow at the summit.

== List of Laamɓe Dukku ==
Dukku has had seventeen laamɓe [fulani leaders] (singular: laamɗo), traditional rulers. The following is their list and duration of their reign.

- Sammbo Geno ɓii Arɗo Abdu (7 years and 6 months)
- Demmbo Dugge ɓii Idrisa (2 years and 3 months)
- Muhammadu Gaaɓɗo ɓii Geno (40 years and 5 months)
- Gorki ɓii Demmbo (3 years and 4 months)
- Muhammadu Bello ɓii Gaaɓɗo (7 years and 8 months)
- Yakubu ɓii Gaaɓɗo (8 years and 7 months)
- Adamu ɓii Gorki (2 years and 3 months)
- Adamu Dagaari ɓii Gaaɓɗo (4 years and 6 months)
- Usmanu ɓii Gaaɓɗo II (1 year and 2 months)
- Jibir ɓii Gorki (7 years and 6 months)
- Sulaimanu Ankwai ɓii Gaaɓɗo (17 years and 10 months)
- Adamu ɓii Sulaimanu (2 years and 3 months)
- Sammbo Ñaande ɓii Jibir (9 months)
- Haruna Rashidu ɓii Yakubu I (36 years and 6 months. Dethroned 18/12/1942)
- Usmanu ɓii Tafida Baaba II (03/05/1942-25/11/1963)
- Abdulkadir Haruna Rashid (13/02/1964-24/12/2012)
- Alhaji Haruna Abdulkadiri Rashid (1 January 2013 to date)I

== Notable people ==
- Abubakar Habu Hashidu, governor of Gombe State 1999–2003
- Aishatu Jibril Dukku, member of the House of Representatives 2015–2023
- Sa'idu Ahmed Alkali, senator for Gombe State from 2010
- Kawu Peto Dukku, senator for Gombe State 2007–2010
- Umar Usman Dukku, senator for Gombe State 1999–2003

== Wards in Dukku ==
There are three district areas in the Local Government, namely: Dukku, Hashidu, and Gombe Abba. And overall there are eleven (11) wards in the LGA:

- Gombe Abba
- Hashidu
- Jamari
- Kunde
- Lafiya
- Malala
- Waziri North
- Waziri South / Central
- Wuro Tale
- Zange
- Zaune
- Baluru
