= Gombe Abba =

First Capital of Gombe State

Gombe-Abba was established by Modibbo Buba yero, the student of Usman Dan Fodiyo, after the 1804 Jihad war. It is located about a kilometre off the Gombe - Kano highway, near a river and on a hilly area. Gombe Abba is the first capital of Gombe Emirate and inextricable part of Gombe history.

== History ==
After the establishment of the Gombe emirate by Buba Yero, he made Gombe Aba his headquarters and started to subdue the country by campaigning against the Jukun settlements of Pindiga and Kalam, including the countries of the Tangale and the Waja. Gombe Abba flourished and enjoyed the luxury of an emirate..

However, with the peaceful conquest of the Gombe Emirate in 1903 by the British colonialists under the reign of Umaru Kwairanga (1898-1922) led to the end of development in Gombe Abba. The British colonialists found Gombe-Abba to be too disconnected from the rest of the emirate and it made the new administration difficult for them to run.

In 1913, the British colonialists moved their administration to Nafada and also instructed the Emir Umaru to follow them. Six years later, the British colonialist relocated to the present day Gombe in order to make it easier for the British to effectively manage the people of Tangale-Waja and Dadiya, located in southern Gombe.

However, the departure of the Emir's seat led to the downfall of the once prominent town of Gombe Abba.

== Emirs ==
Prior to the relocation of the Gombe Emirate to its present location in Gombe, seven emirs, including the founder, Modibbo Bubayero, had ruled the emirate from Gombe-Abba.

The seven emirs that ruled in Gombe-Abba town are:

- Bubayero (1824 - 1841) - ruled from the time he was till the time of his death and he was buried in Gombe Abba.
- Emir Sulaiman (1841-1844) - succeeded Bubayero. He was the first son and he ruled just three years before he died in Kano on his sojourn back to Gombe-Abba from Sokoto, and was buried there.
- Emir Muhammad Kwairanga (1844-1882) - was the brother of Emir Sulaiman and he reigned for 38 years. After his demise, he was buried near his father’s tomb in Gombe Abba.
- Emir Abdulkadir Zailani (1882-1888) - was the eldest son of Emir Mihammad Kwairanga. He died after six years on the throne; he was buried in Birin Bolewa.
- Emir Hassan (1888-1895) - the brother of Zailani, ascended the throne and died after ruling for only seven years, he was buried in Dukku.
- Emir Tukur (1895-1898) - was the last Emir to rule Gombe as part of the Sokoto Caliphate. He died after just three years reign and was buried near his father and grandfather’s tomb.
- Therefore, Emir Umaru (1898-1922) - succeeded Emir Tukur and was the last emir to use Gombe-Abba as the capital. it was during his reign that the British peacefully subdued Gombe emirate and ordered him to relocate to Nafada and afterwards to the present day Gombe.
