= Faro River =

River in Nigeria and Cameroon

Coordinates: 9.3333°N 12.9250°E

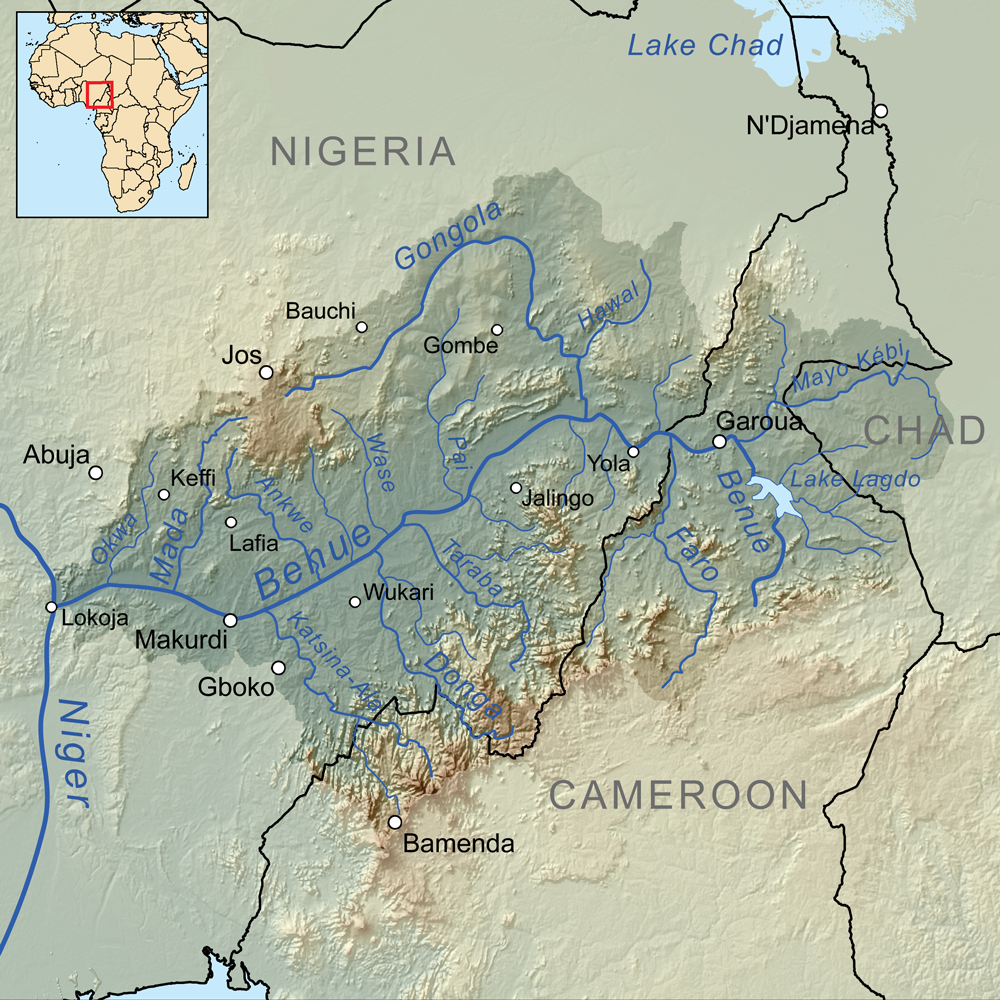
Map showing the Benué River drainage basin. The Faro River can be seen to the south of it.

The Faro River is a 310-kilometre-long (190 mi) river that flows over the Nigeria–Cameroon border in Africa. Its source is on the Adamawa Plateau, which lies southeast of Ngaoundéré, in the Adamawa Region of Cameroon. A tributary of the Benue River, they meet on the border.

== See also ==
- Communes of Cameroon
