= Bolewa people =

Ethnic groups in Gombe State, Nigeria

Bolewa
Biya Pikka

Total population
- Approximately 243,000

Regions with significant populations
- Nigeria

Languages
- Bole

Religion
- Islam; traditional beliefs

The Bolewa people are an ethnic group located in the northern part of Gombe State. According to Bolewa tradition, their ancestors originated in Yemen. They migrated together with the invaders and originators of the kingdoms of Kanem and Songhai. The Bolewa speakers were found all over the banks of the Gongola River, occupying various communities in the west and north-west areas of Borno, such as Kalam, Fali, Daniski, Kafarati, Mbara and Bauchi.

== History ==
In the 13th century, the Bolewa people were well established in the Gombe area, and they also made their appearance in the Gongola valley, as suggested by Palmer, where he referred to them as Ata-Gara. During the reign of Kano Abdullahi popularly known as Sarkin Kano, (1499–1509) the Kalam Bolewa settlement was established where they occupied places like Geri-kom, Tappi, Gadam, Dolli, Bojude, Bolari, Biri, Bomala, Gabukka etc.

However, Kalam Bolewa which was a stronghold for Bolewa was raided a century later by the people of Kano.

== Bolewa socialisation ==
Bolewa socialization was created around the predecessor cult, believing that the forefathers' spiritual worship, involving rituals and sacrifices, is the basis of humanity. The notable feature of Bolewa cult was rain- making cult. This is attributed to ancestor's spirit among the Bojude, Dirri and Tappi, Bolewa who believed in "Konon" while Bolewa of Gadam, Dolli and Geri Kom, refer it to as "Konon-Ako" or "Konon Akku".

“The Konon Akku” was a well-known Jukun ancestral god believed to give spiritual protection and can deliver all Jukuns at the time of trouble.

== Rituals and sacrifices ==
The Bolewa people observe rituals and make sacrifices during cultural festivities, such as "Gamdo" or "Ngwando". This cultural practice is popular among the Bolewa, particularly when the people experience short periods of rain or drought. They are said to pay tribute to ancestors or great "Auni" (Bolewa kings) who were buried in special places for the protection of the new ruler. The cultural practices were full of fetish, it involved circumbulations of graves based on the "Gamdo" rite. The other well-established Bolewa cultural festival was the "Dengti" or "Dengtide" but exclusively among the Bolewa of Kafarati the culture was observed annually, in which men wore women's clothes and women, in turn, wore men's clothes. It was carried out on the outskirts of the Bolewa community, particularly, around a well-known Baobab tree, believed to be the abode of the Kwami people.

== Change of religion ==
With the coming of Islam, most Bolewa became Islamised and abandoned all their beliefs and cultures. C.K Meeks (1931) asserted that the Bolewa belongs to the same group of invaders as the founders of the kingdoms of Kanem and Songhai, who were also believed to have come into Africa from Yemen.

== Languages ==
Bolewa people speak Bole Language.
