= Gombe Emirate =

Traditional state in Nigeria

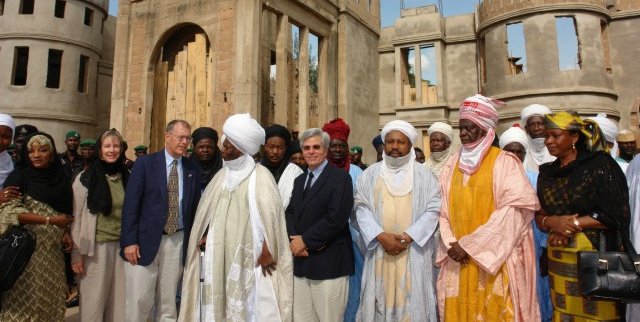
The late Emir of Gombe, Alhaji Shehu Usman Abubakar (Center left) receives U.S. Embassy Charge' d’Affaire Robert E. Gribbin (center right) outside the emir's palace in Gombe (20 September 2007)

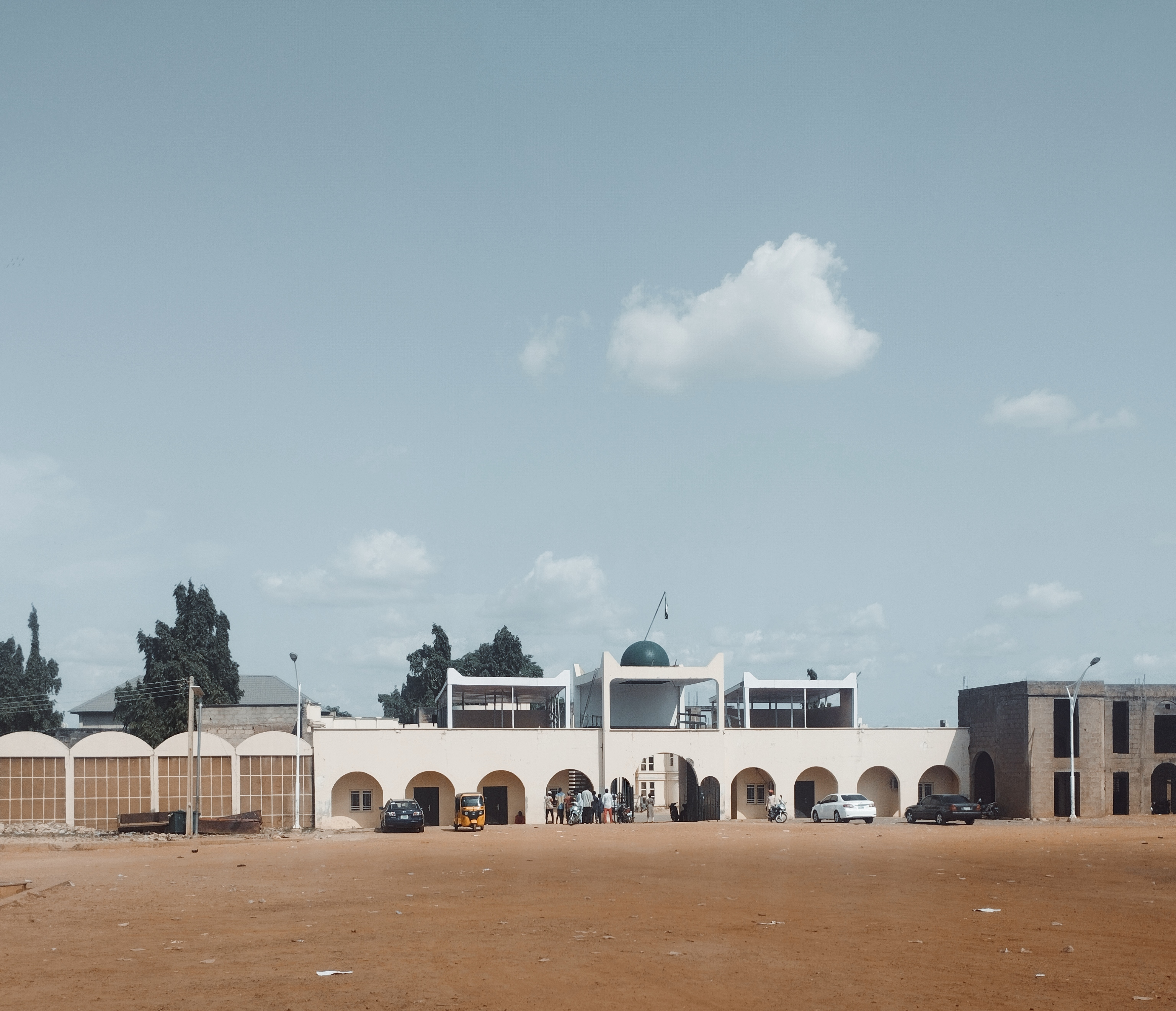
Emirs Palace Gombe

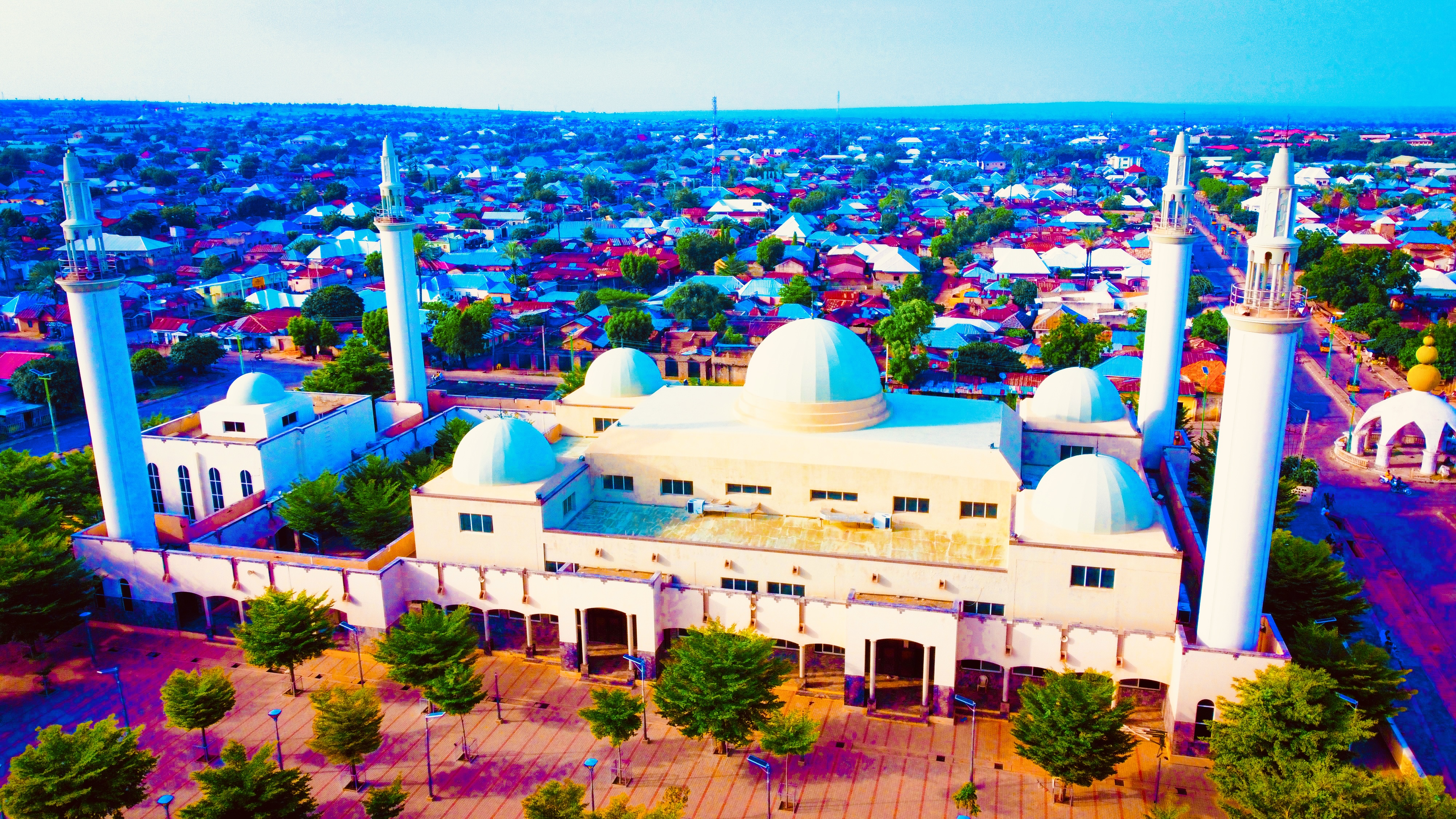
The_Gombe Central Mosque, emir's palace, Gombe

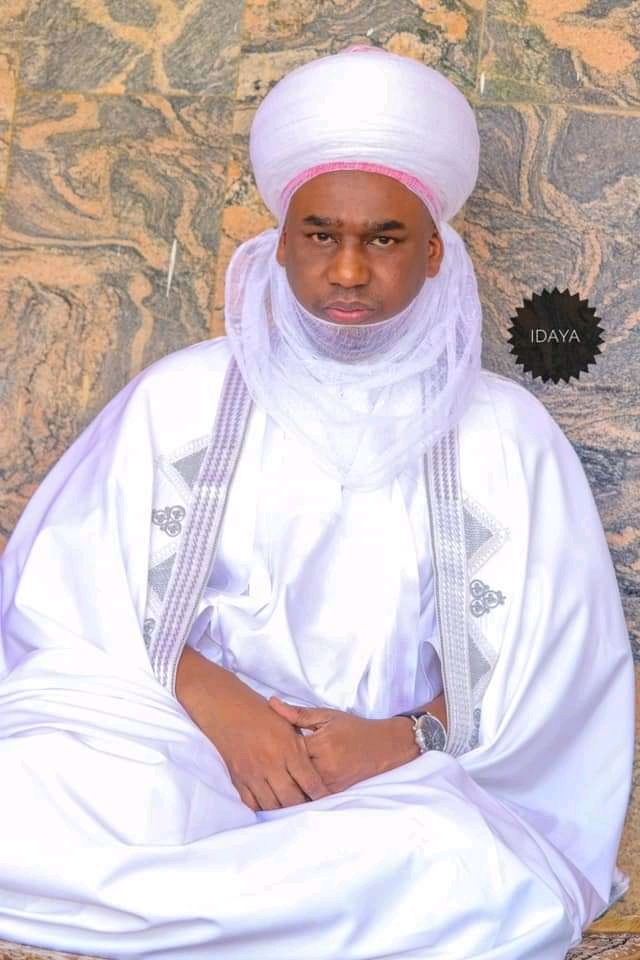
Abubakar Shehu-Abubakar, the current emir of Gombe

The Gombe Emirate (Fula: Lamorde Gombe 𞤤𞤢𞤥𞤮𞤪𞤣𞤫 𞤺𞤮𞤥𞤥𞤦𞤫) is a traditional state in Nigeria that roughly corresponds in area to the modern Gombe State.The current Emir of Gombe is Alhaji Abubakar Shehu Abubakar III, who acceded on 6 June 2014. The late Emir of Gombe, Alhaji Shehu Usman Abubakar, who precedes his father Abubakar II had been Emir since August 1984.

== History ==
=== Early history ===
The Gombe emirate was founded in 1804 during the Fulani jihad by Buba Yero, a follower of Usman dan Fodio. Buba Yero made Gombe Abba his headquarters for a campaign against the Jukun settlements of Pindiga and Kalam, followed by extensive raids in which he went as far as Adamawa on the other side of the Benue River. Further lands were subdued by his son, Muhammadu Kwairanga, Emir of Gombe from 1844 to 1882. The Gombe emirate at one time extended from Gombe Abba to Jalingo, but in 1833 the Muri Emirate was created from part of its territory to form a state for the Emir's brother.

During the reign of Emir Zailani (1882–1888) a religious zealot, Mallam Jibril Gaini, established himself at Burmi on the border between Gombe and Fika. Gaini managed to hold out for years against the combined forces of Gombe and neighboring emirates, and was finally defeated and exiled by the British Royal Niger Company in 1902. The British conquered Gombe at the Battle of Tongo in 1902. They moved the capital of Gombe to Nafada in 1913, and moved the capital again in 1919 to the present Gombe Doma. Waja was separated from Gombe in 1930 to become an independent District. However, the Waja headmen chose Sarkin Yaki of Gombe, brother of the former Emir Umaru dan Muhammadu, as their chief.

=== Post-colonial era ===
The British had set up the Gombe Native Authority system, which continued to function after independence in 1960. In 1976, the military regime of Olusegun Obasanjo broke up the Native Authority into the Gombe, Akko and Dukku Local Government Areas. In 2002, Gombe State Governor Abubakar Habu Hashidu broke up Gombe Emirate into parts, ruled by 2nd Class Emirs and two Senior District Heads. The following year Governor Mohammed Danjuma Goje created two additional Senior District Heads. This has reduced the authority of the Emir at a time of increasing conflict between farmers and nomadic Udawa herders, compounded by violence from extremist religious groups.

== Culture ==
=== The Emir's Palace ===
The Gombe Palace serves as Gombe Emirate's administrative headquarters. It was built by the late Shehu Usman Abubakar, the 10th Emir of Gombe, who ruled from January 1984 until May 2014.

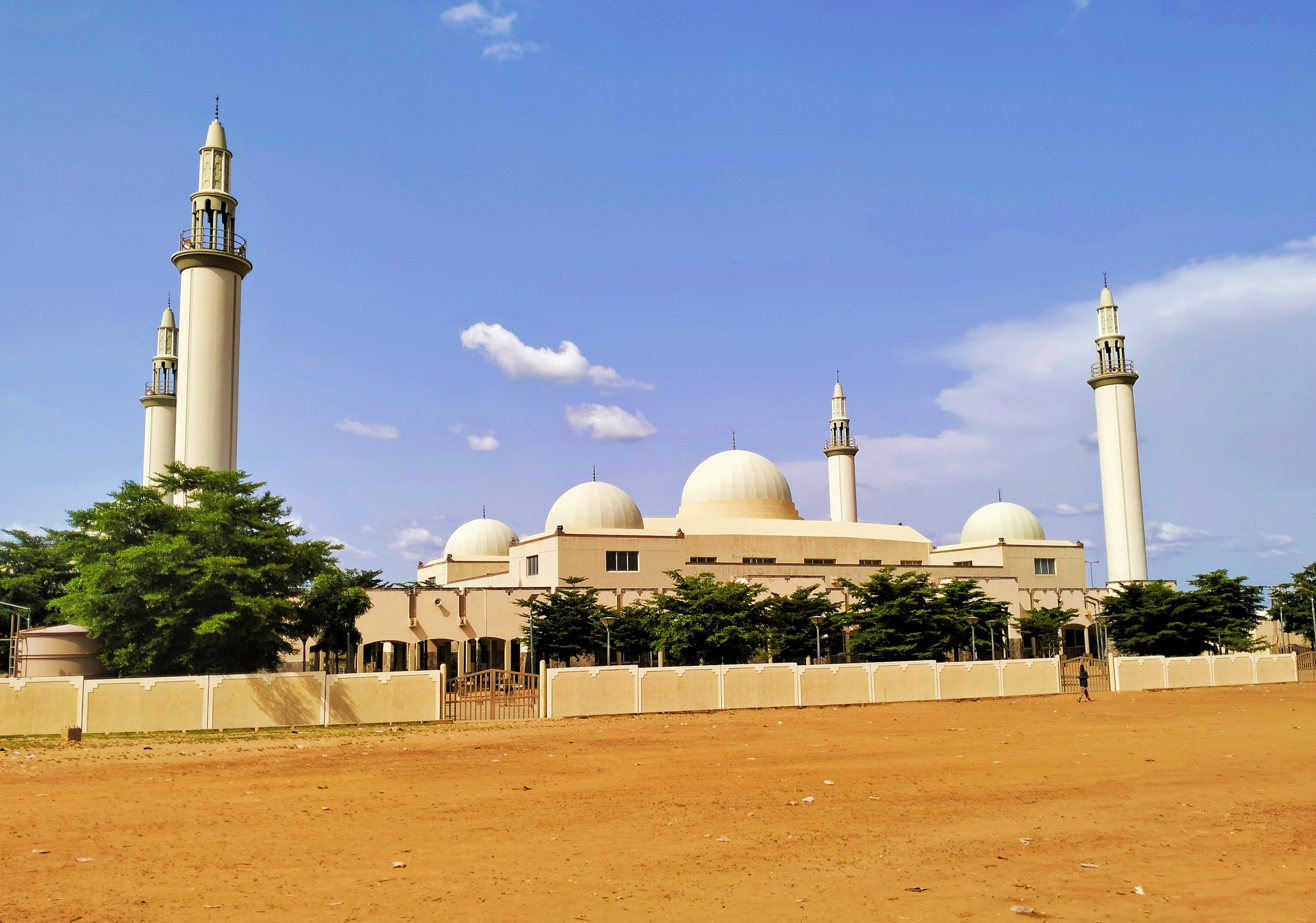
Central Mosque of Gombe Emirate, Gombe State

The Emir of Gombe Palace is one of the Gombe State people's cultural treasures. It has been regarded as a key tourist attraction in Gombe for numerous years. The palace is regarded as Gombe State's most impressive architectural design due to its superb structure.

=== Language ===
The Gombe Emirate is a multiethnic and multicultural community, however, Fulfulde is the most widely spoken language in the emirate. The Fulani tribe found themselves in a position of power and leadership after the traditional rulers were overthrown all over Hausa territory and beyond. In a multiethnic and multicultural society, it is assumed that the ruling class is always well-liked. As a result, the ruling class's ethnic group is frequently emulated or even replicated by other ethnic groups out of respect and adoration.

=== Trade ===
Politically and numerically, the Fulani have dominated the region; this community includes livestock Fulani, semi-settled Fulani, and settled Fulani. During the 1930s, many semi-nomadic Fulani settled in southern Gombe and decided to stay because of the rich pasture and farm land, with some giving up their herds entirely to focus on cotton and corn farming. Settlers frequently travel long distances with their family, bringing seed and farming tools; money loans and small-scale food-for-work schemes are used to keep the settlers afloat until the first harvest.

The general trend of development has been toward more market access, which has resulted in increasing agricultural productivity and income, as well as the stimulation of industrial expansion. From open stalls, Gombe markets offers a large choice of intangible traditional/local products such as crafts, farming equipment, traditional fabrics, calabash, and decorative leatherwork, as well as a wide range of things that are uniquely distinctive to the market, such as crafts and antiques.

== Rulers ==
Rulers of Gombe Emirate:

Start	End	Ruler
1804	1841	Abubakar "Buba Yero" dan Usman Subande (b. c.1762 – d. 1841)
1841	1844	Sulaymanu dan Abubakar (d. 1844)
1844	1882	Muhammadu Kwairanga dan Abi Bakar (d. 1882)
1882	1888	Abd al-Qadiri Zaylani dan Muhammadu (d. 1888)
1888	1895	Hasan dan Muhammadu (d. 1895)
1895	1898	Tukur dan Muhammadu (d. 1898)
1898	1898	Jalo dan Muhammadu
1898	1922	Umaru dan Muhammadu (d. 1922)
1922	1935	Haruna dan Umaru (d. 1935)
January 1936	January 1984	Abu Bakar dan Umaru (b. 1902)
January 1984	27 May 2014	Shehu Usman Abubakar
June 2014	Present	Abubakar Shehu Abubakar III (b. 1977)

== Festival ==
Durbar festival is celebrated in almost all 19 northern state including the Gombe emirate, it is celebrated to mark the end of "holy fasting" in the month of Ramadan known as Eid-El-fitr.

There are three durbar with first commencing as soon as the Emir enter his palace courtyard after observing the Eid prayer, the 2nd durbar is horse riding from the palace to the Government and the last is when the Emir rides in beautiful horses and his entourages, warriors and acrobats sees his subjects on the road and this is known as Hawan Gida Gwamnati.

== Food ==
The emirate is known for production of Groundnut (peanuts) and cotton. The major cash crops include cereals e.g maize, legumes e.g Soya bean, fruits e.g Oranges and Vegetables such as tomatoes.
