= Abdullahi Bappah Ahmed =

Nigerian politician and academic

State Commissioner for Science and Technology in Gombe State
- Constituency: Gombe state

Personal details
- Born: 1983 (age 42–43) Shamaki Ward, Gombe Local Government Area
- Parent: Alh Bappah Garkuwa
- Education: Peoples' Friendship University of Russia University of Abuja
- Occupation: Lecturer; politician; scholar

Abdullahi Bappah Ahmed is a Nigerian politician and a lecturer in the Physics Department at the Faculty of Science, Gombe State University.

== Early life ==
Abdullahi Bappah Ahmed was born in 1983 in Shamaki Ward, Gombe Local Government Area. He holds a Bachelor of Science degree in Physics from the University of Abuja and completed his Master's and Ph.D. in Mathematical Physics at the Peoples Friendship University of Russia in 2017. He is a member of the Institute of Physics (IOP) in the UK, a reviewer for the MiPh journal in Moscow, and leads the Condensed Matter Group at the Peoples Friendship University of Russia. He was awarded with a sum of $3 million grant by BESDA to enhance educational opportunities for out-of-school children in Gombe State.

== Political career ==
Abdullahi Bappah Ahmed was appointed as the Coordinator of the Better Education Service Delivery for All (BESDA) program for Gombe State by Governor Muhammadu Inuwa Yahaya, as announced by the Governor's Senior Special Assistant for Media and Publicity, Mr. Ismaila Uba Misilli. During his tenure as the Coordinator he was able to enroll over 350 out of school child into formal education and established more than 630 non-formal learning centers for both Almajiri (Tsangaya School) and girl child. Trained more that 1500 teachers in formal schools with the new curriculum of Mukarant and let’s read by NEI+. He also serves as the State Commissioner for Technology in Gombe State.
