= Abdullahi Smith =

West African history and culture scholar

- Born: Henry Fredrick Charles Smith; 5 May 1920; Somerset
- Died: 1984 (aged 63–64)

Academic background
- Education: University of Cambridge

Academic work
- Notable students: Yusufu Bala Usman; Murray Last; Mahmud Modibbo Tukur; Abdullahi Mahadi

Abdullahi Smith (born Henry Fredrick Charles Smith, 5 May 1920 – 1984) was a scholar of West African history and culture. He was particularly interested in Arab influence in Nigeria. Professor Smith was the first Director of Arewa House personally picked by its founder Ahmadu Bello.

== Academic career ==
Smith was one of the first historians to document the complex history of conflict between Europeans and Arabs in Nigeria. He introduced to the west the existence of massive archives of Arabic literature and historical records in Nigeria, which he had anticipated as the natural result of "a powerful tradition of Arabic learning (which indeed persists to the present day)." Smith argued consistently that scholarship had neglected the Arabic history of West Africa, in part because of the complexity of the historical situation and in part because of anxiety over Europe's role. Smith taught at the University of Ibadan. He was Professor of History at Ahmadu Bello University and pioneer Director of Arewa House.

Professor Smith established the Department of History at Ahmadu Bello University in September 1962 which later produced some of the greatest Nigerian Historians such as Bala Usman and Mahmud Modibbo Tukur.

Abdullahi Smith is well known for his contributions on the history of Hausaland and its Sokoto Caliphate. He initiated major efforts towards the establishment of documentation and research centres and facilities in the form of archives, libraries, museums and an archaeological unit.

Professor Henry F.C. Smith converted to Islam while he was the Director of Arewa House and changed his name to Abdullahi Smith.

== Legacy ==
The lecture theatre at the Faculty of Arts in Ahmadu Bello University is named after him. The Abdullahi Smith Centre for Historical Research is named after him and conceived by Bala Usman, Muhammadu Dikko Yusufu and George Kwanashie.
