= Aliyu Usman El-Nafaty =

Vice-Chancellor, Gombe State University

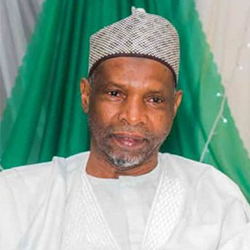

Vice Chancellor
- Chancellor: Abubakar Shehu-Abubakar |||
- Preceded by: Prof.Ibrahim Musa Umar

Personal details
- Profession: Gynecologist

Professor Aliyu Usman El-Nafaty MBBCH, FWACS, FICS, OFR is a Professor of Obstetrics & Gynaecology and former vice-chancellor of Gombe State University.

== Early life ==
El-Nafaty was born on 25 December 1960 in Nafada, Gombe State.

== Career ==
He worked at the University of Maiduguri as a lecturer in 1989, and was promoted through the ranks to a Professorship Before he was appointed the Vice Chancellor of Gombe State University in 2019, Prof. Aliyu Elnafaty held the position of Medical Director Federal Medical Centre Gombe 2002-2010, during his tenure, the Hospital was transformed to an efficient and robust Health Service delivery Centre that won the Prestigious Ministerial Prize of Honor as the best Medical Centre in the Federation in the 2007. He also served as the Deputy Provost, Ag. Provost and Deputy Vice-Chancellor of the University.

The Vice-Chancellor co-authored the Book titled: Early Detection and Management of Pre-Eclampsia/Eclampsia for Health Workers in Developing Countries. In addition, he also published many Journal Articles on the same subject.

== Fellowship ==
- El-Nafaty obtained the Fellowship of the West African College of Surgeons in 1994 and was Conferred with the Fellowship of the International College of Surgeons.
- He also won the prestigious John D. and Catherine T. MacArthur Foundation Research Grant on Leadership Development in 1996.

== Selected publications ==
Some of the publications of professor Aliyu Usman El-Nafaty are:

- Nutritional factors associated with anaemia in pregnant women in northern Nigeria
- Risk factors for obstetric fistulae in north-eastern Nigeria
- High-density lipoprotein and homocysteine levels correlate inversely in preeclamptic women in northern Nigeria
- Obstructed labour: a public health problem in Gombe, Gombe State, Nigeria
- Prevalence of rubella-specific IgG antibody in non-immunized pregnant women in Maiduguri, north eastern Nigeria.
- The analysis of eclamptic morbidity and mortality in the Specialist Hospital Gombe, Nigeria
- Caesarean morbidity and mortality at Maiduguri, Nigeria
- Prevalence of utero-tubal infertility
- Knowledge and attitude to cervical cancer screening among women in Maiduguri, Nigeria
- Early versus late closure of vesicovaginal fistulas
- Perceived causes of eclampsia in four ethnic groups in Borno State, Nigeria.
- Attitude of Nigerian women to contraceptive use by men
- Gender attitude to the empowerment of women: an independent right to contraceptive acceptance, choice and practice
- The influence of travel time to health facilities on stillbirths: a geospatial case-control analysis of facility-based data in Gombe, Nigeria
- The impact of recycled neonatal incubators in Nigeria: a 6-year follow-up study
