= Arewa House =

Research centre in Kaduna, Nigeria

Coordinates: 10.5531°N 7.4458°E

- Gidan Arewa
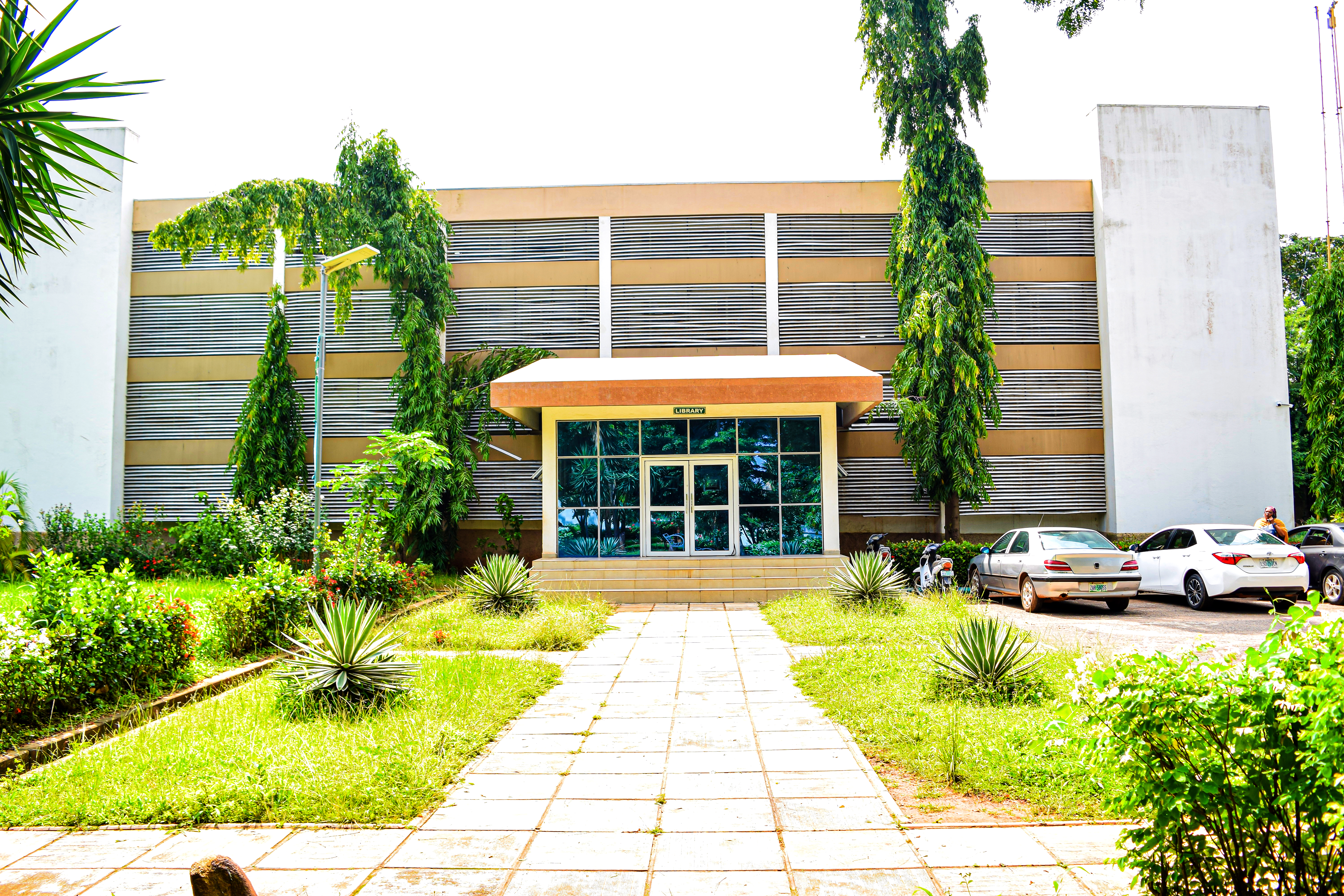
- Arewa House Library
- Interactive map of the Arewa House area

General information
- Location: Rabah Road, Kaduna State, Nigeria

Arewa House (Hausa: Gidan Arewa) is a center for research and historical documentation under Ahmadu Bello University, Zaria, located in Kaduna, Kaduna State, in Northwest Nigeria. It also served as the residence and office of the Premier of the defunct Northern Nigeria Region.

== History ==
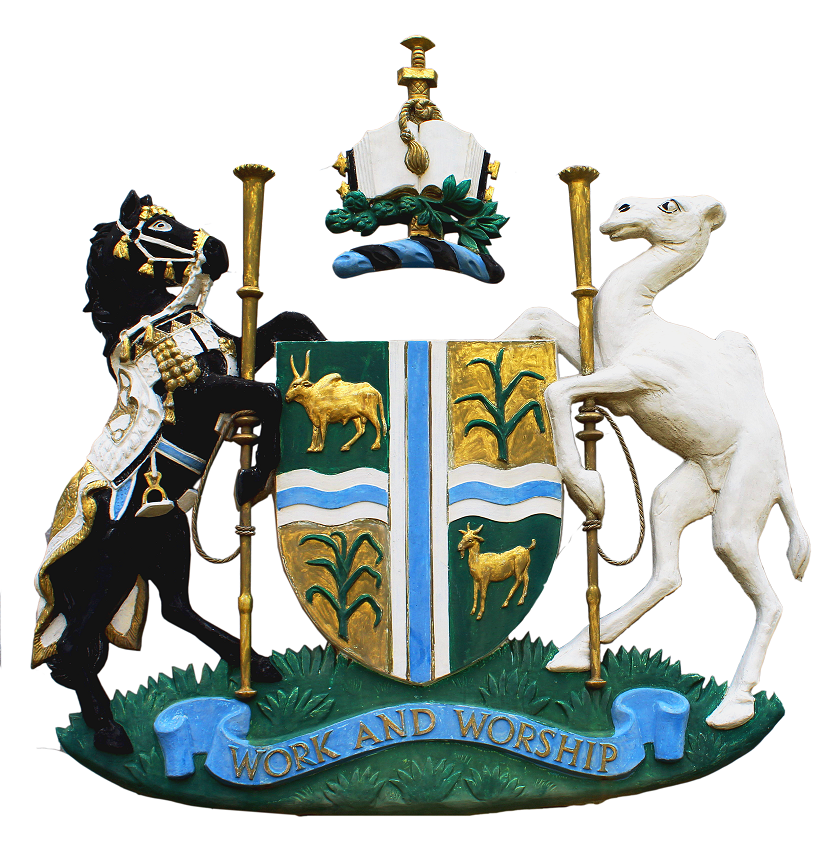
Defunct Arewa coat of arm

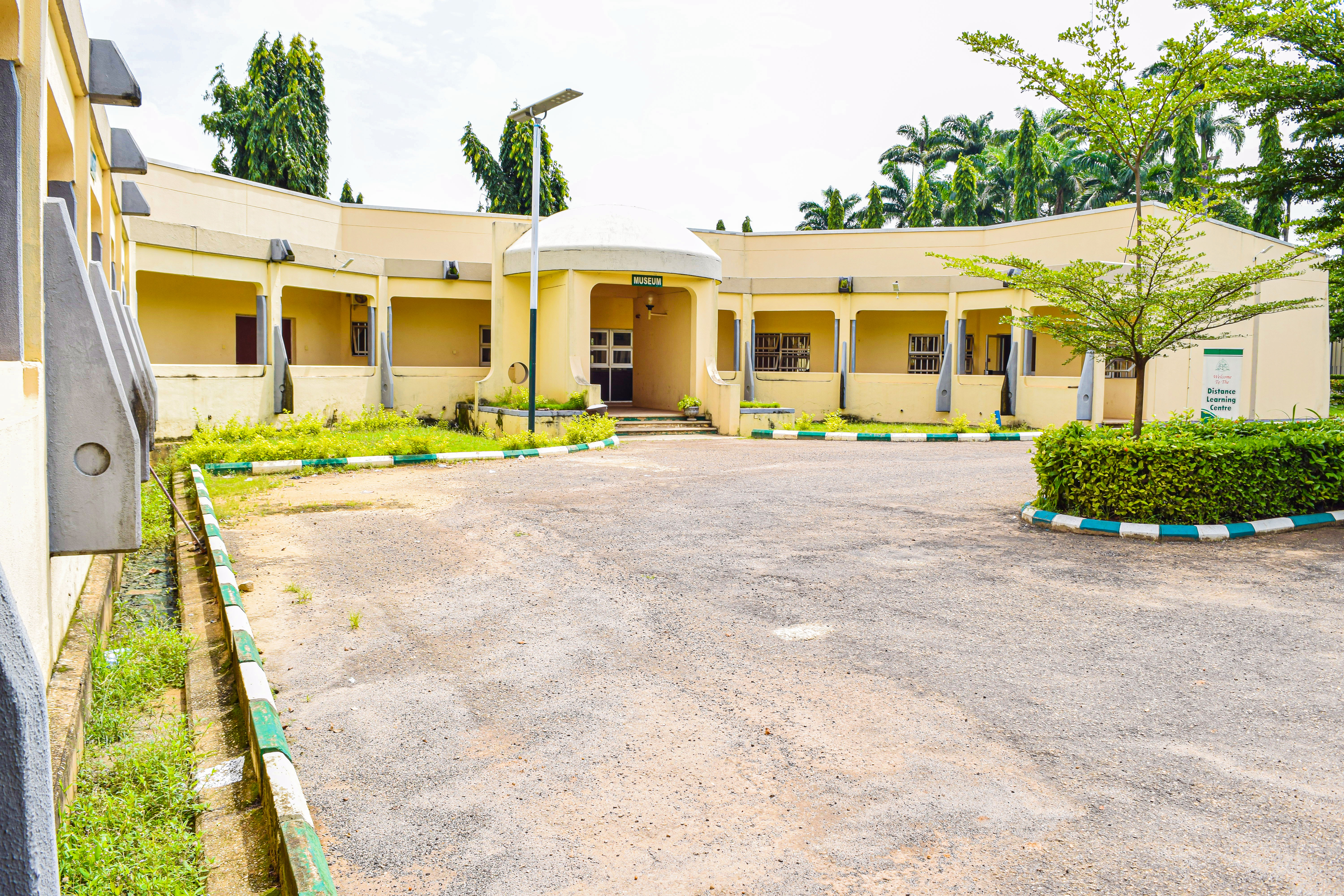
Side View of Arewa House Museum

Arewa House is the center for historical documentation and research of the Ahmadu Bello University, Zaria, Nigeria. Located at No. 1 Rabah Road, in the residence of the late Premier of Northern Nigeria. The house was established in 1970 under the directorship of Professor Abdullahi Smith, who died in 1984 and was succeeded by Dr. Bashir Ikara in 1986. The center is concerned not only with research and documentation of the history and culture of the people of Northern Nigeria, but also with contemporary studies on policy, peace and leadership. The aim of the house is to serve as a center for documentation and research in history and contemporary challenges.

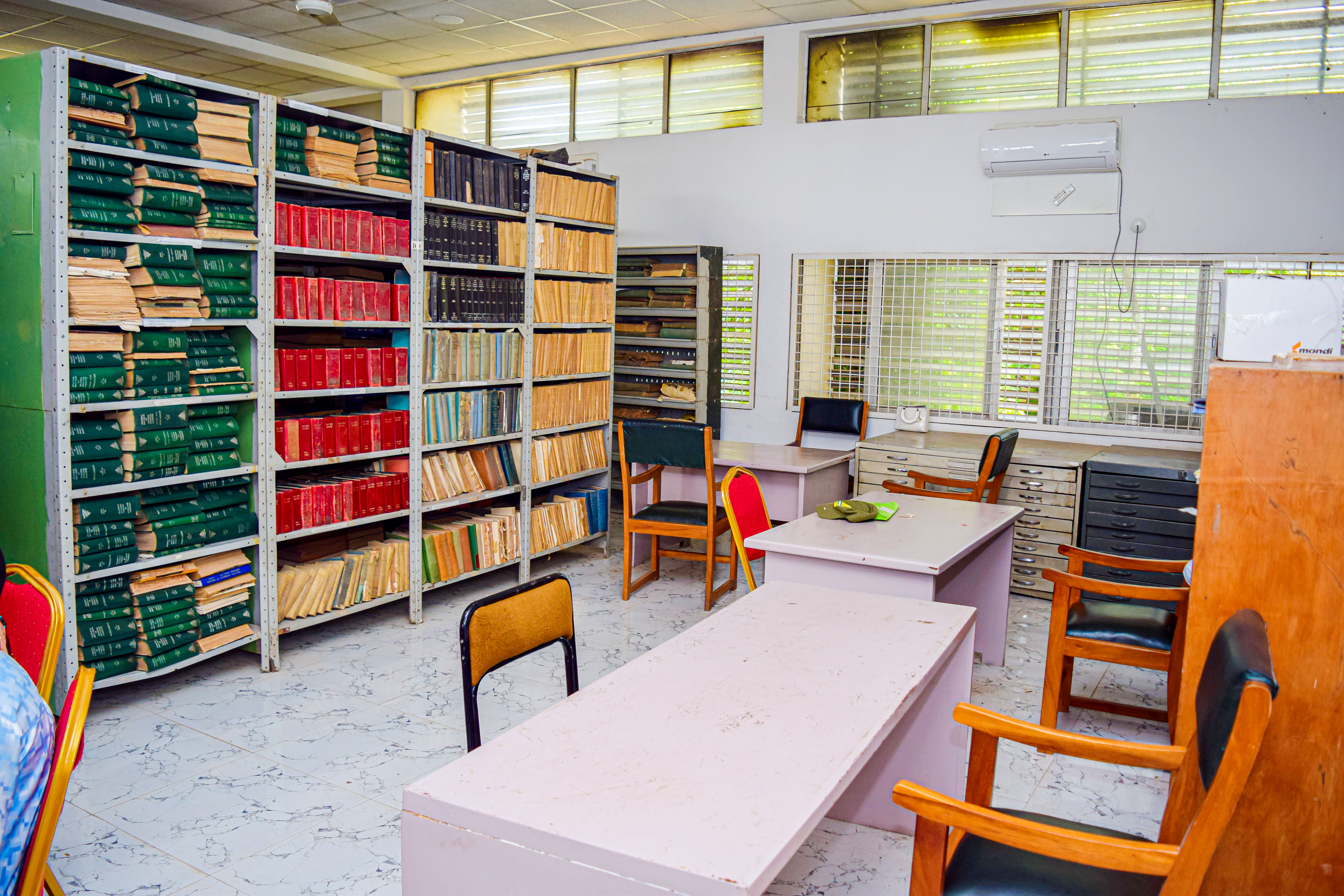
A workstation of Arewa House Library

Though under the authority of Ahmadu Bello University Zaria, Arewa House has an independent board of trustees and governing council. It is headed by an executive director, who runs the day-to-day activities of the house.

== List of directors ==
S/N	Name of director	Year of service	Profession	Ref.
1.	Prof. Abdullahi Smith	1970 - 1980	Historian	
2.	Prof. Bashir A. Ikara	1986 -1991		
3.	Prof. Abdullahi Mahdi	1991 - 1999	Historian	
4.	Dr. Hamid Bobbi	1999 -2006	Historian	
5.	Dr. Mahmoud Hamman	2006 - 2010		
6.	Dr. Kabiru S. Chafe	2010 - 2014		
7.	Prof. Abdulkadir Adamu	2014-2017	Historian	
8.	Prof. Sule Bello	2017-2019	Historian	
9.	Dr. Shuaibu Shehu Aliyu	2020 -2024	Historian	
10.	Prof. Salisu Bala	2024 - 2025	Historian	
11.	Prof. Aliyu Yahaya	2025 - Date		

Prof. Aliyu Yahaya is the current director of the house.

== Research ==
As a center for historical documentation and research, Arewa House is concerned with procuring, preserving, analyzing and discussing issues of national and international interest, and in particular with issues of specific interest to the development of northern Nigeria.

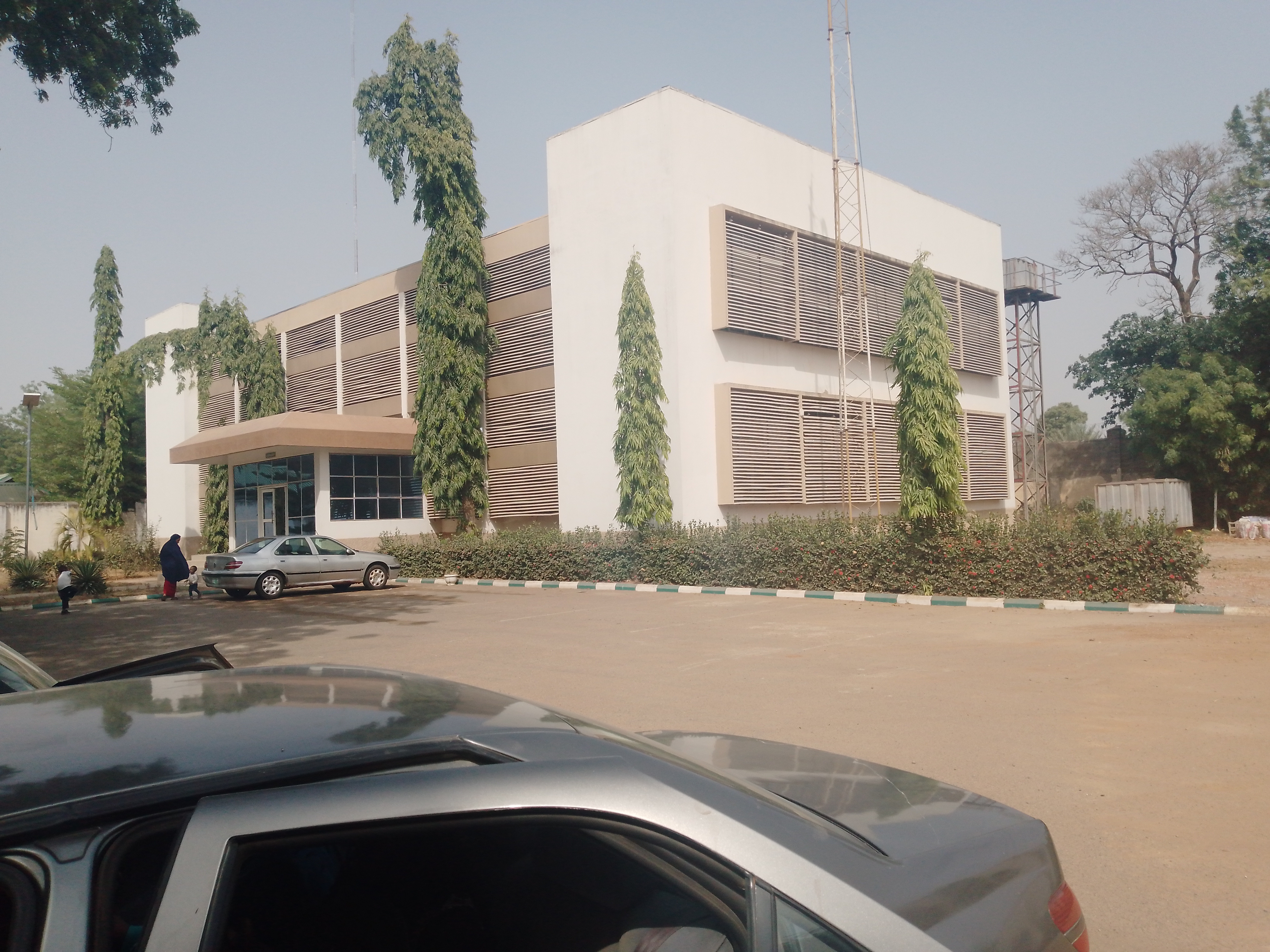
Arewa library in kaduna state

The history of Arewa House as a center for research and historical documentation goes back to 1970, when the History of Northern Nigerian Committee was given the responsibility of writing a book on the history of northern Nigeria. This was after the dissolution of the three regional governments in the country and the creation of twelve states, which also led to the establishment of the Joint Interim Common Services Agency (ICSA) to oversee the joint assets and liabilities of the six newly created northern states. It was in this respect that the residence of the late premier of the Northern region, Sir Ahmadu Bello Sardauna, was formally approved to serve as an office for this project, with the name "Arewa House".

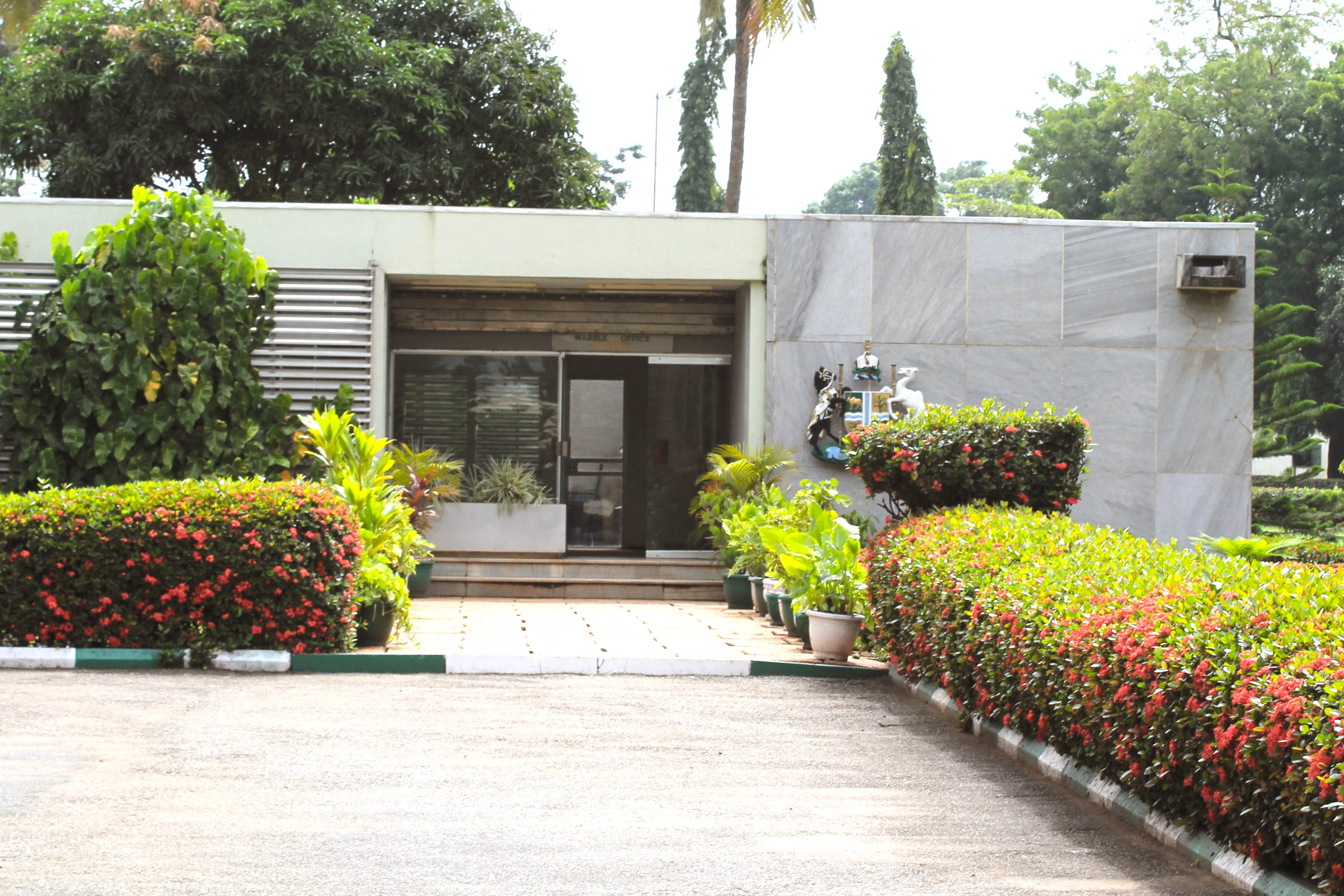
Marble Office

A distinguished scholar, Professor Abdullahi Smith, founding member of the Department of History, A.B.U. was appointed as its first director. In 1975, the control of Arewa House was transferred to Ahmadu Bello University, Zaria on the orders of the then Federal Government of Nigeria. Under Smith, a solid foundation was set that made Arewa House a unique place for research and historical documentation in the whole of West Africa. Arewa House Library has a core collection of books and manuscripts including higher degree dissertations from various universities in Nigeria and abroad. These dissertations cut across different fields of study, most particularly humanities and social sciences. Most are of thematic interest to the study of Northern Nigeria. These collections are further strengthened by a rare collection of Arabic manuscripts, premier's office records, government publications, newspapers and other serial publications, which are housed in the archives. The library also has special collections from prominent Nigerians who donated their collections.

Arewa House welcomes research students and provides research affiliation to students from all parts of the world conducting research on any aspects of the state and society in Northern Nigeria. It is also the established external center for regional development AREWA Center for Regional Development (ACRD), which was founded in June 2016 based on the United Nations (UN) documents of UNCRD - ECOSOC resolutions 1086 C of 18 June 1971 for the people of the northern region of Nigeria, popularly known in Hausa language as "Arewa".

Arewa House has a moderate and affordable accommodation for researchers and non-researchers who are duly registered with it. Other facilities include a conference hall, training rooms, bookshop and restaurant.

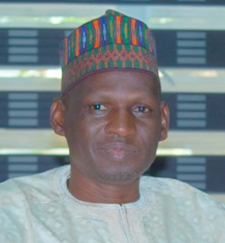
Dr. Shu'aibu Shehu Aliyu, director

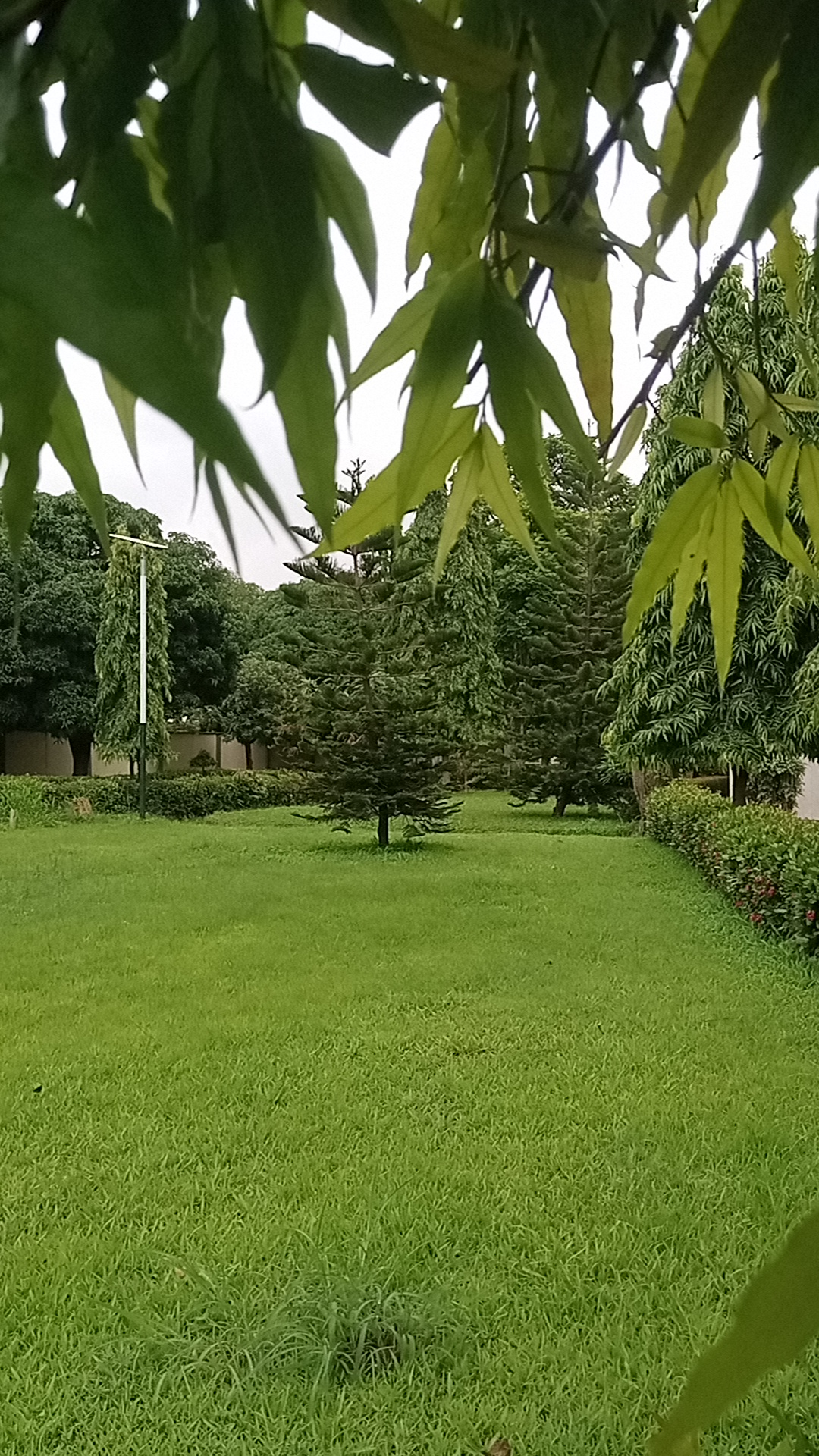
The garden consists of both natural and man-made trees and flowers.

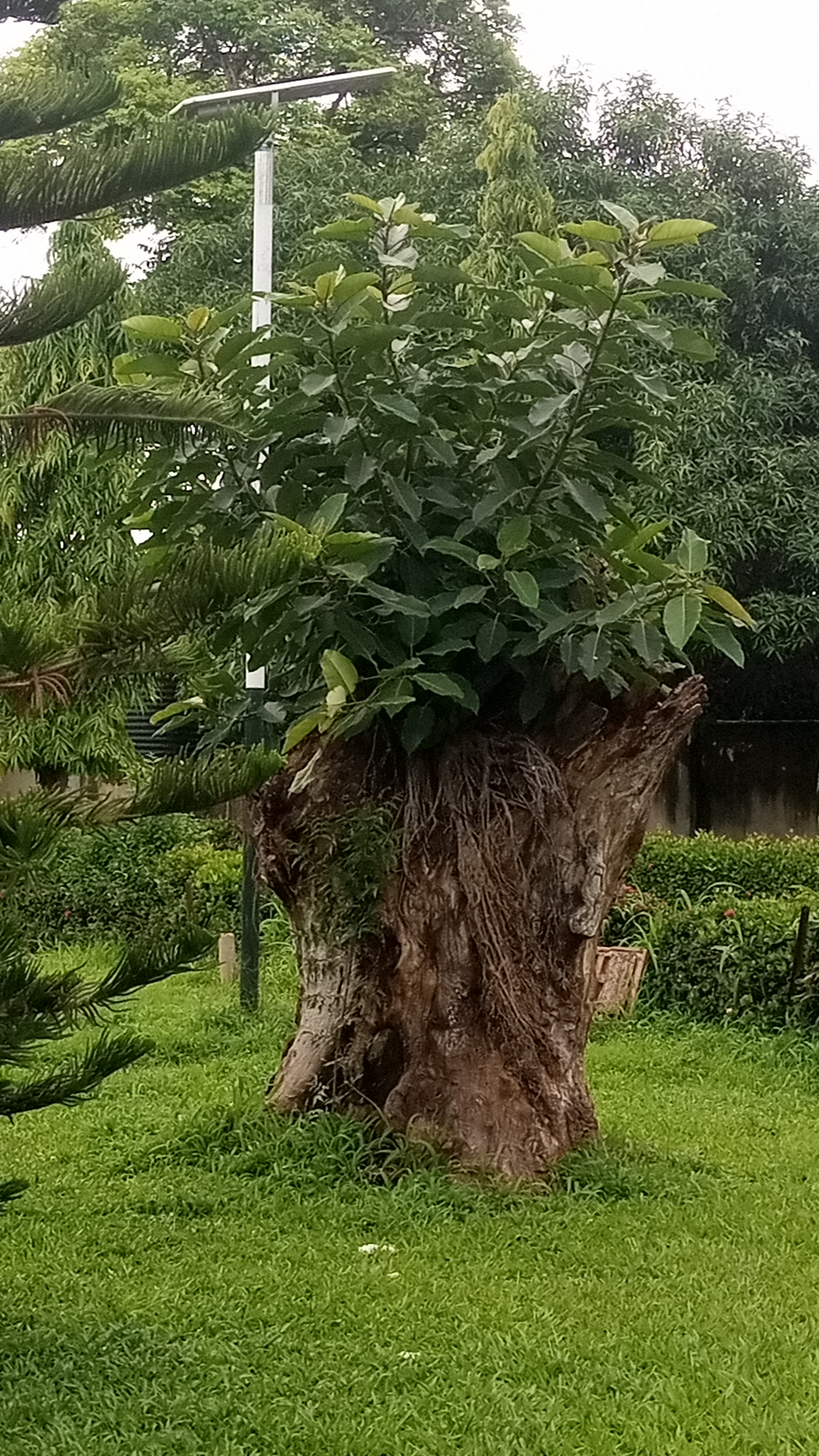
Tree in Arewa House garden

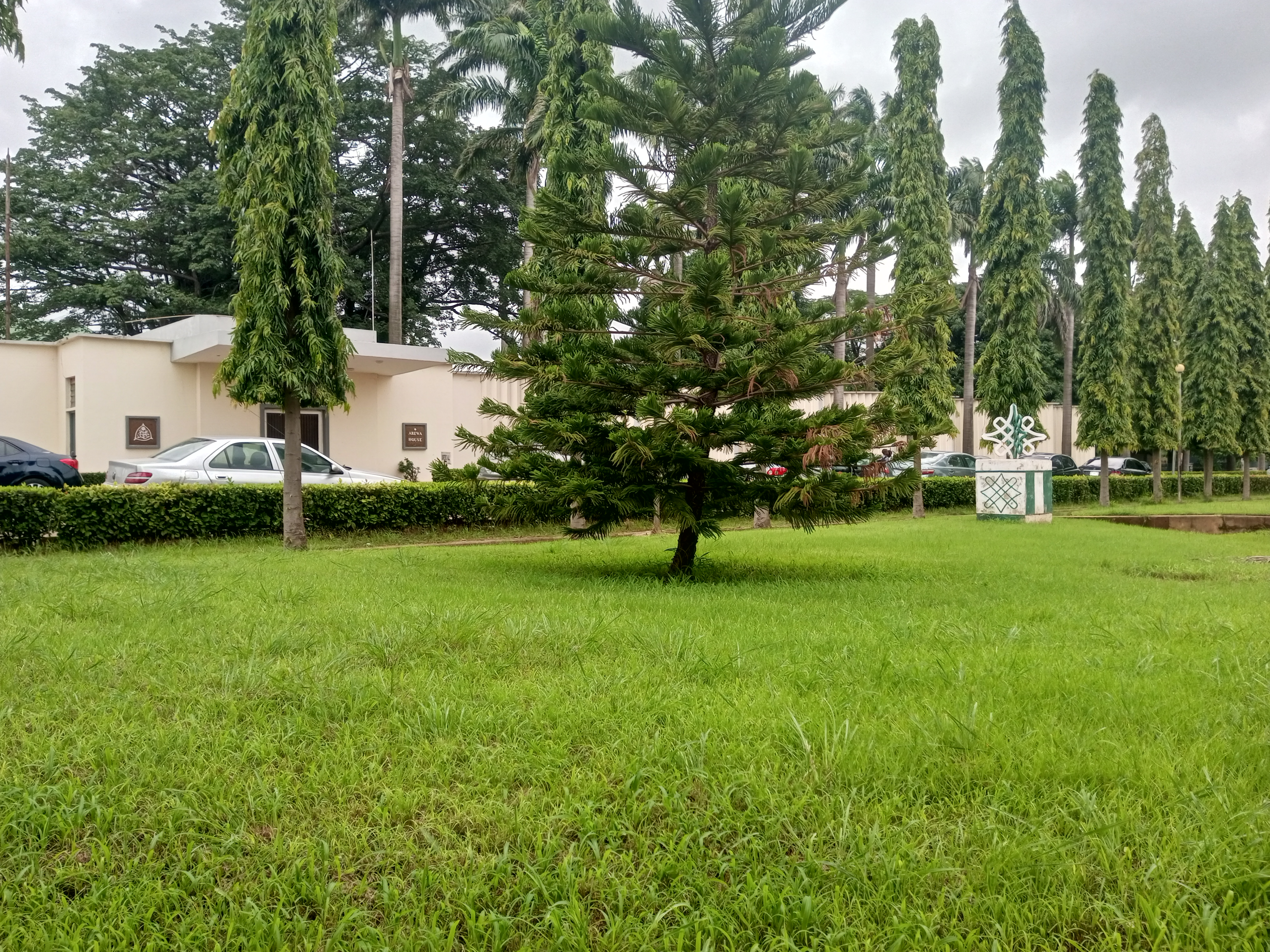
Grasses and umbrella trees located at Arewa House garden

== Structure and use ==
Arewa House is structured in four major departments for effective management: Research, Library, Archives and museum.

Arewa Museum houses cultural artifacts, photographs and books which are accessible to the public. It contains 19 satellite galleries which exhibit the culture and people of Northern Nigeria and also chronicle the life of Ahmadu Bello. It is presently the centre for historical documentation and research of the Ahmadu Bello University, Zaria, Nigeria.

== Mandate of Arewa House ==
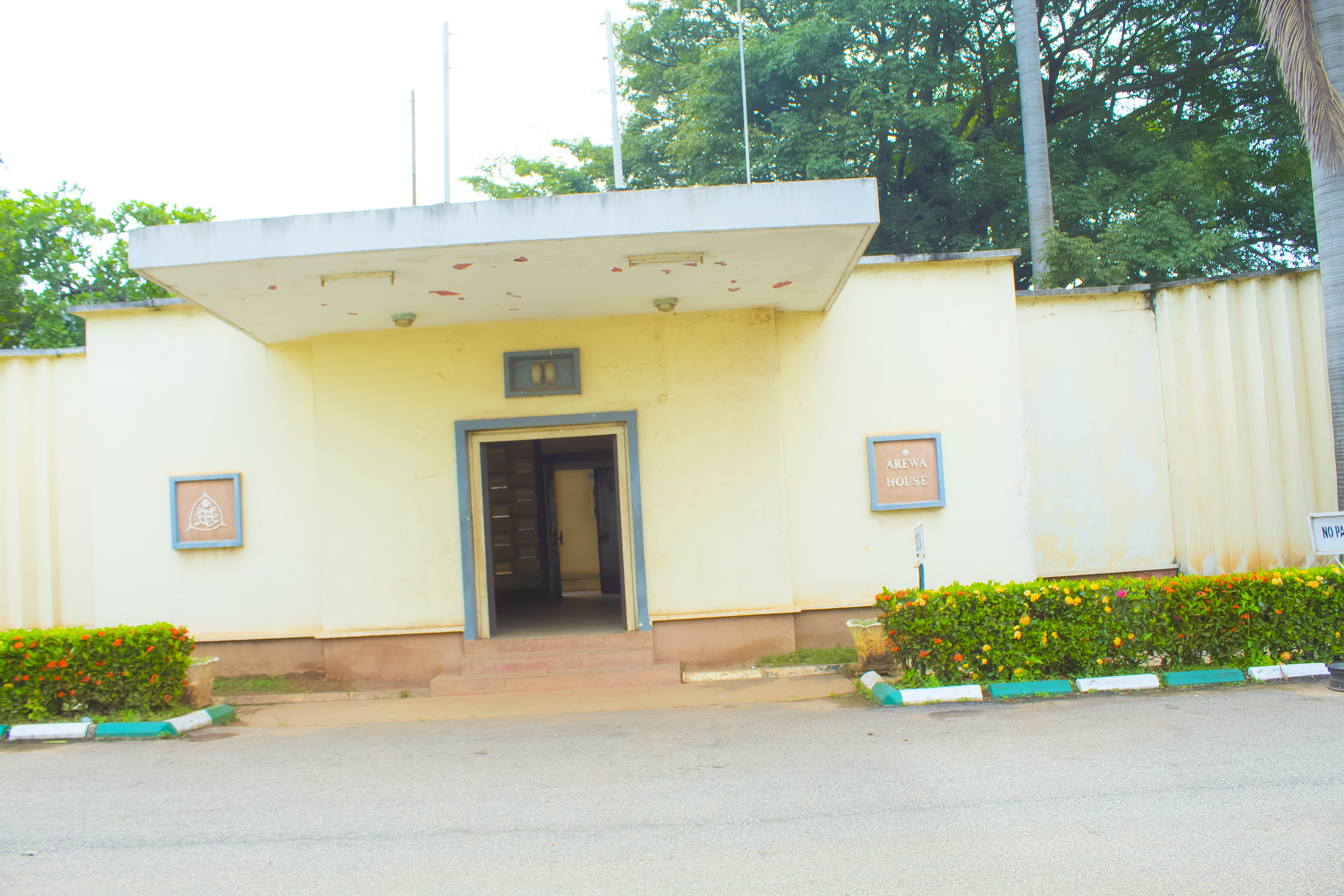
Entrance to the house of the premier

- Maintenance of museum as memorabilia of the life and work of the late Sardauna of Sokoto, and illustrative of the cultural traditions of the North.
- Organisation of academic and cultural activities appropriately associated with the museum, together with an advisory service for state governments in the field of museum development; maintenance of an archive to house the records of the former government of Northern Nigeria
- Organisation of services appropriately associated with such an archive, including an information service for state governments, and practical facilities for training of state archives
- Maintenance of research library to include all printed publications (including government publications) bearing on the history of the North, together with manuscripts, theses, maps, pictures, tape recordings etc.
- Promotion of research on the history of the North in all aspects and periods by members of senior staff of the house, and the provision of facilities for approved post-graduate workers in this field from other institutions (including facilities for post–graduate work by government personnel in education, information, and cultural affairs, tourism, community development, etc.)
- Publication of the results of research undertaken at Arewa House in the form of books and journals to be published by the house

== Arewa House Library and Museum gallery ==
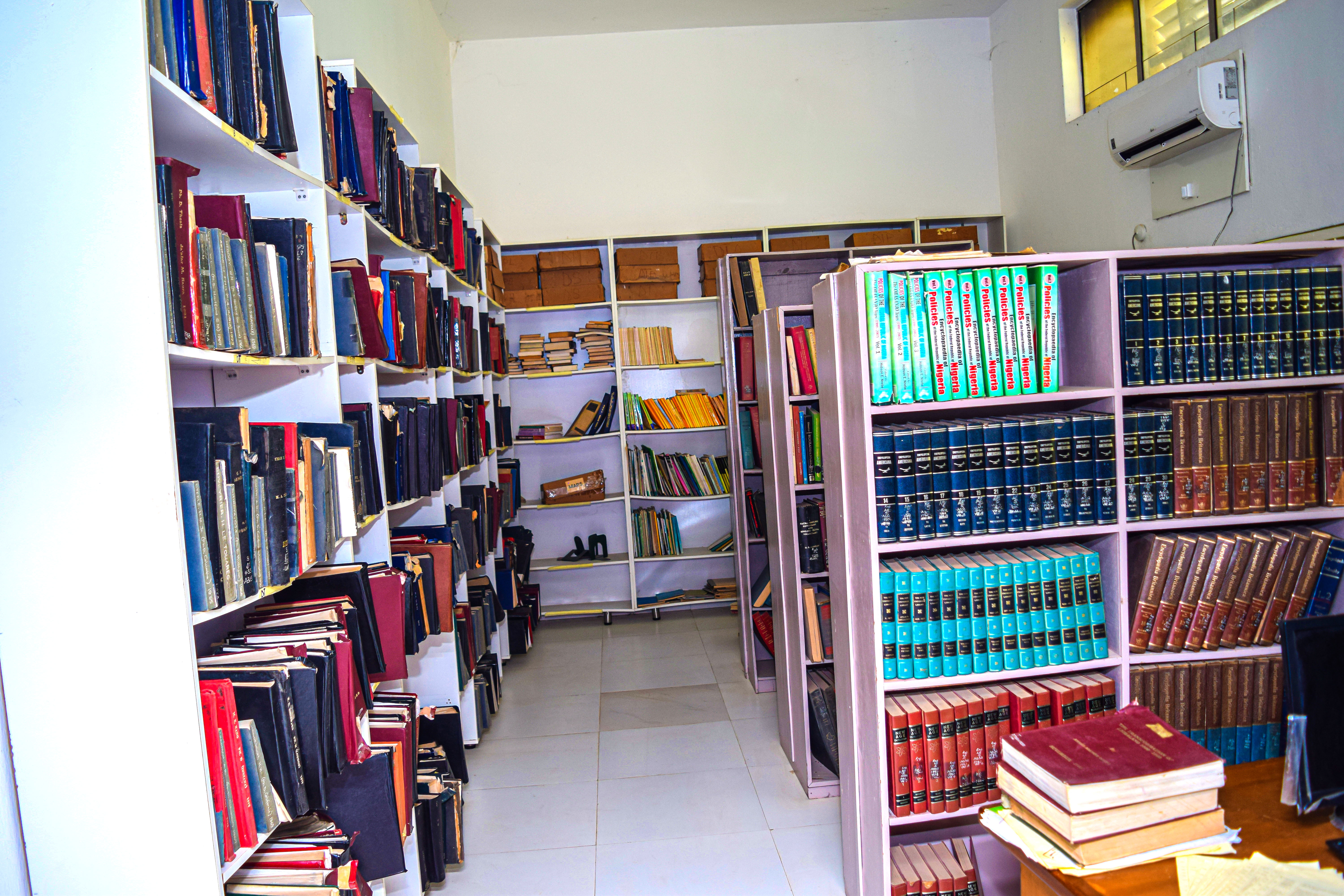
Reference section of the library
Photos of collections in Arewa House Library and Museum

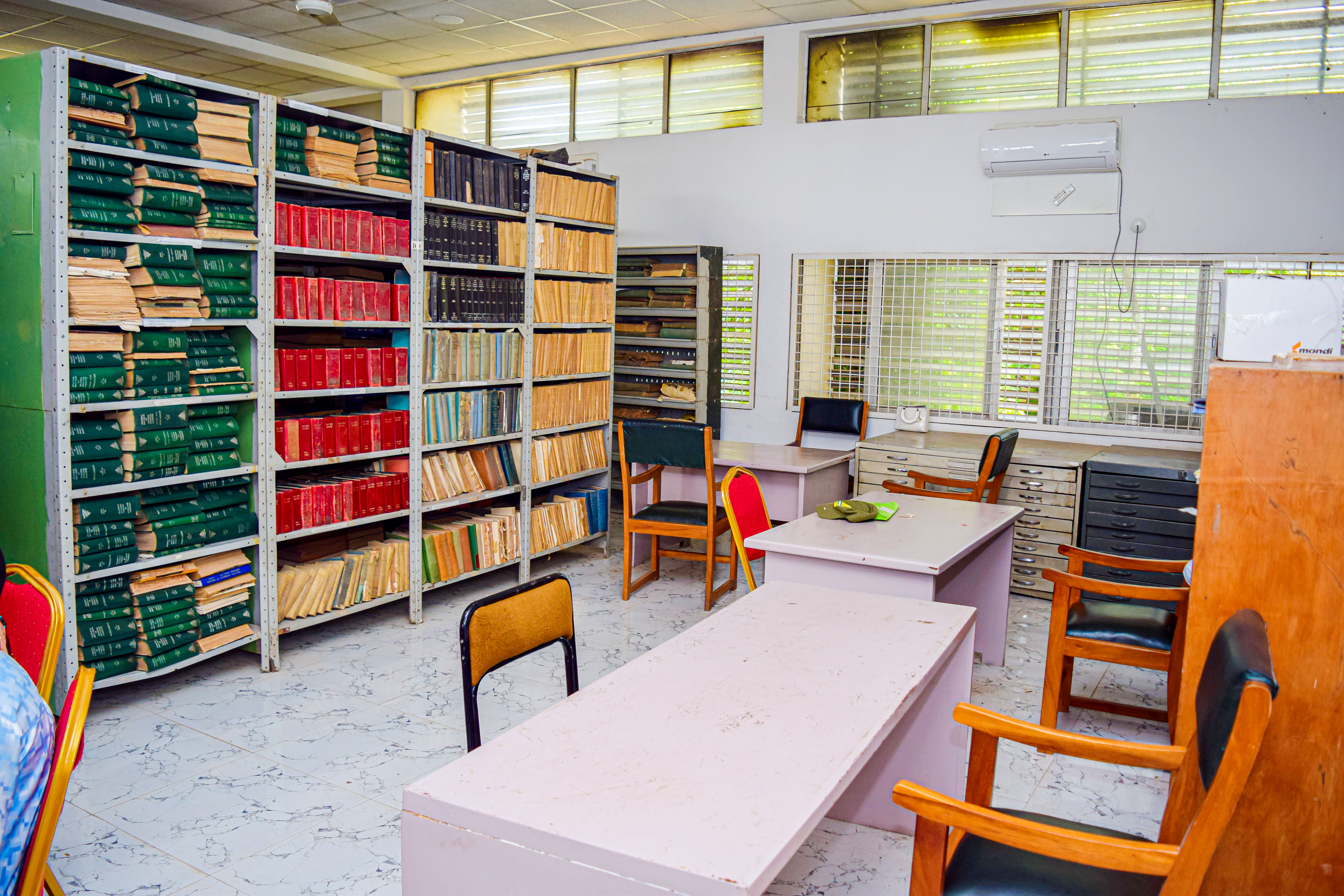
Work station of Arewa House archive

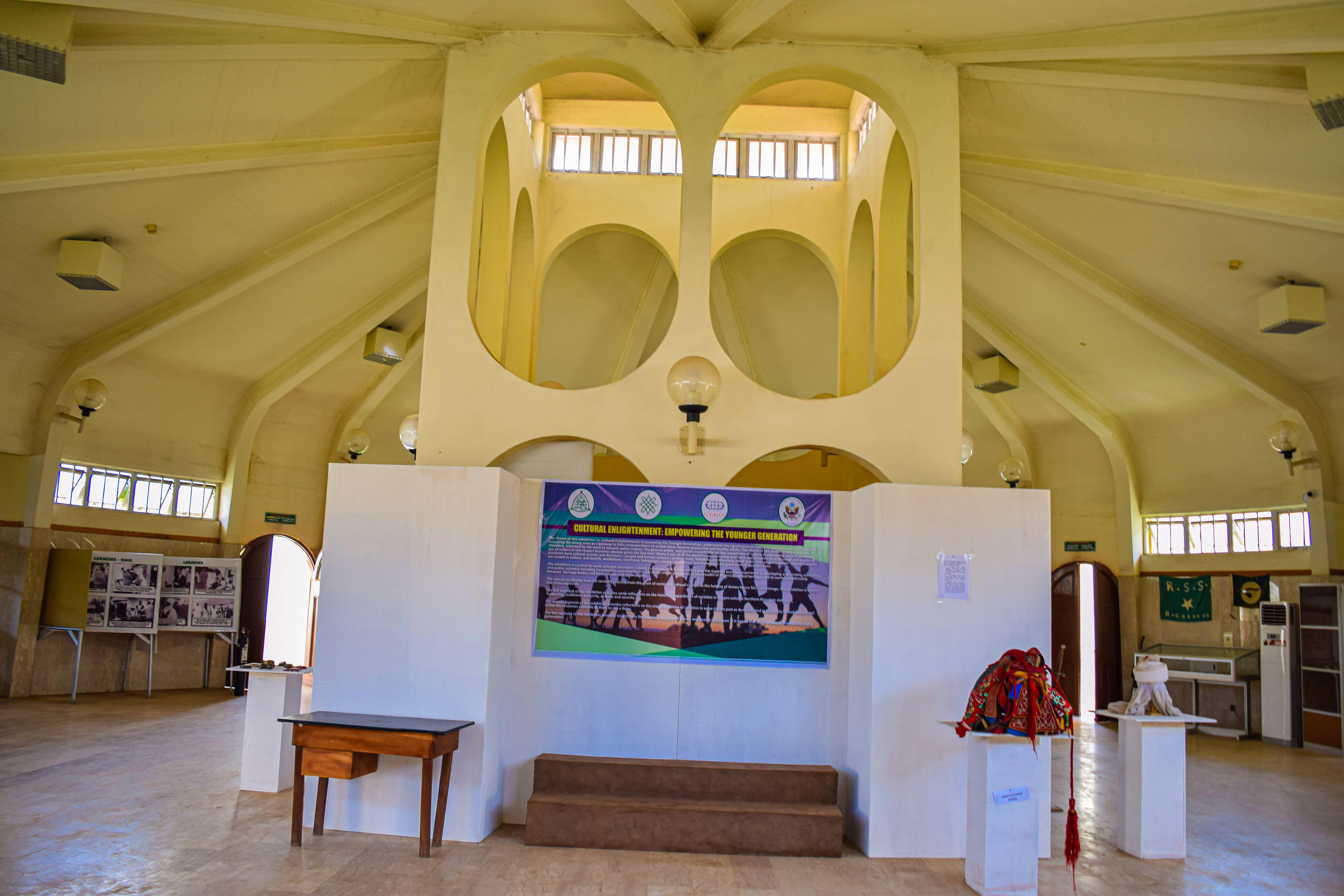
Central gallery of Arewa House Museum

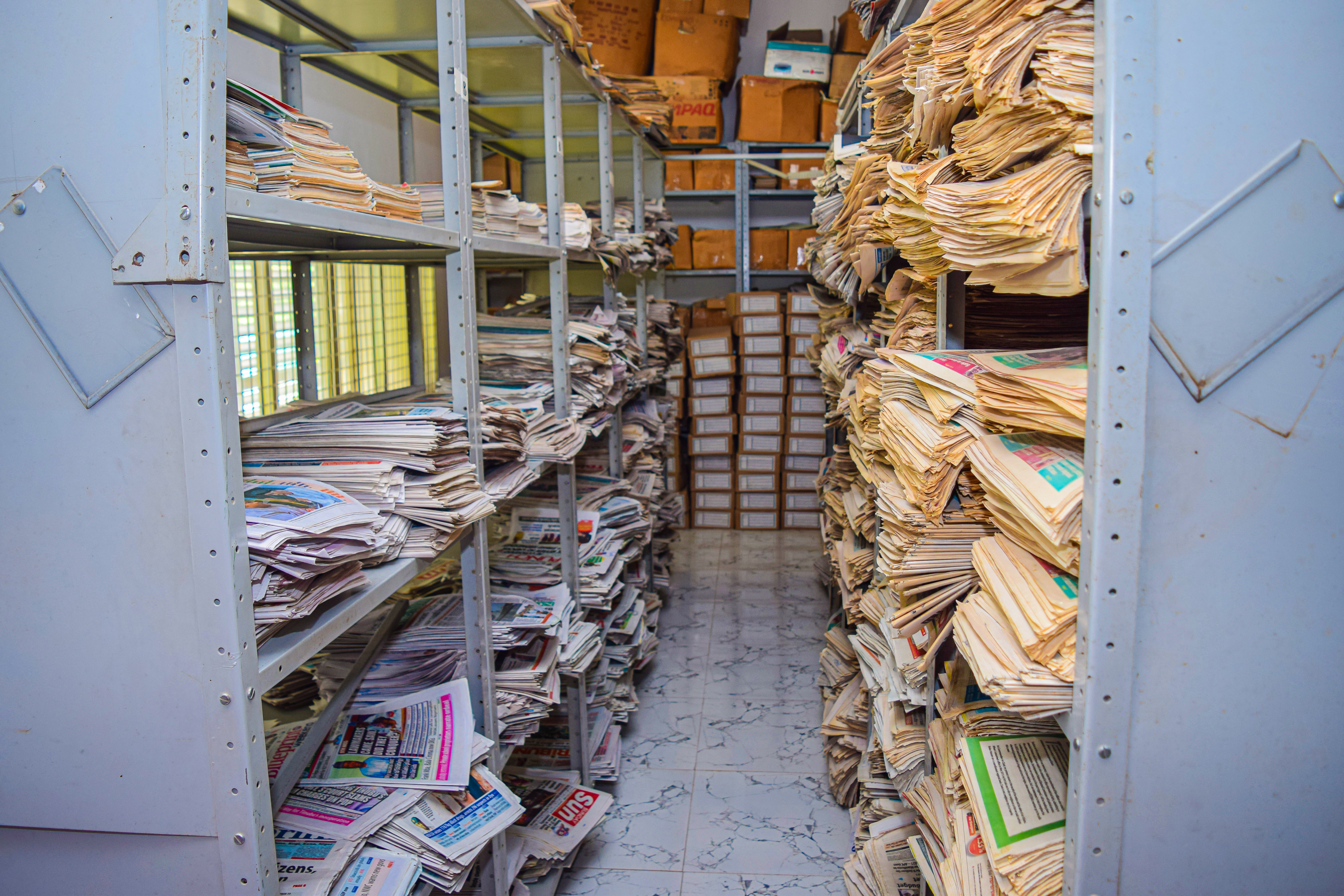
Newspaper unit of Arewa House Archive

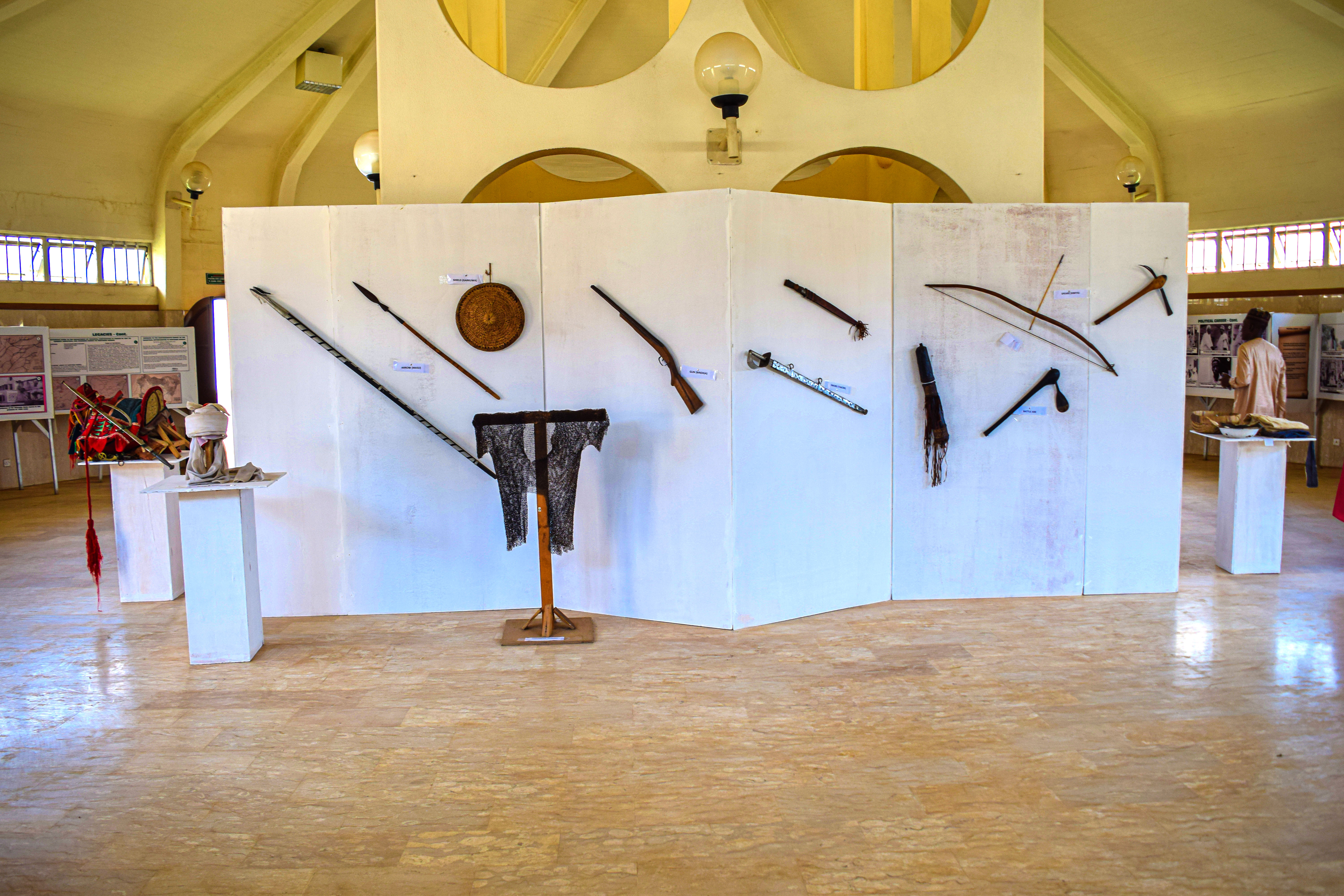
Central gallery of Arewa House Museum

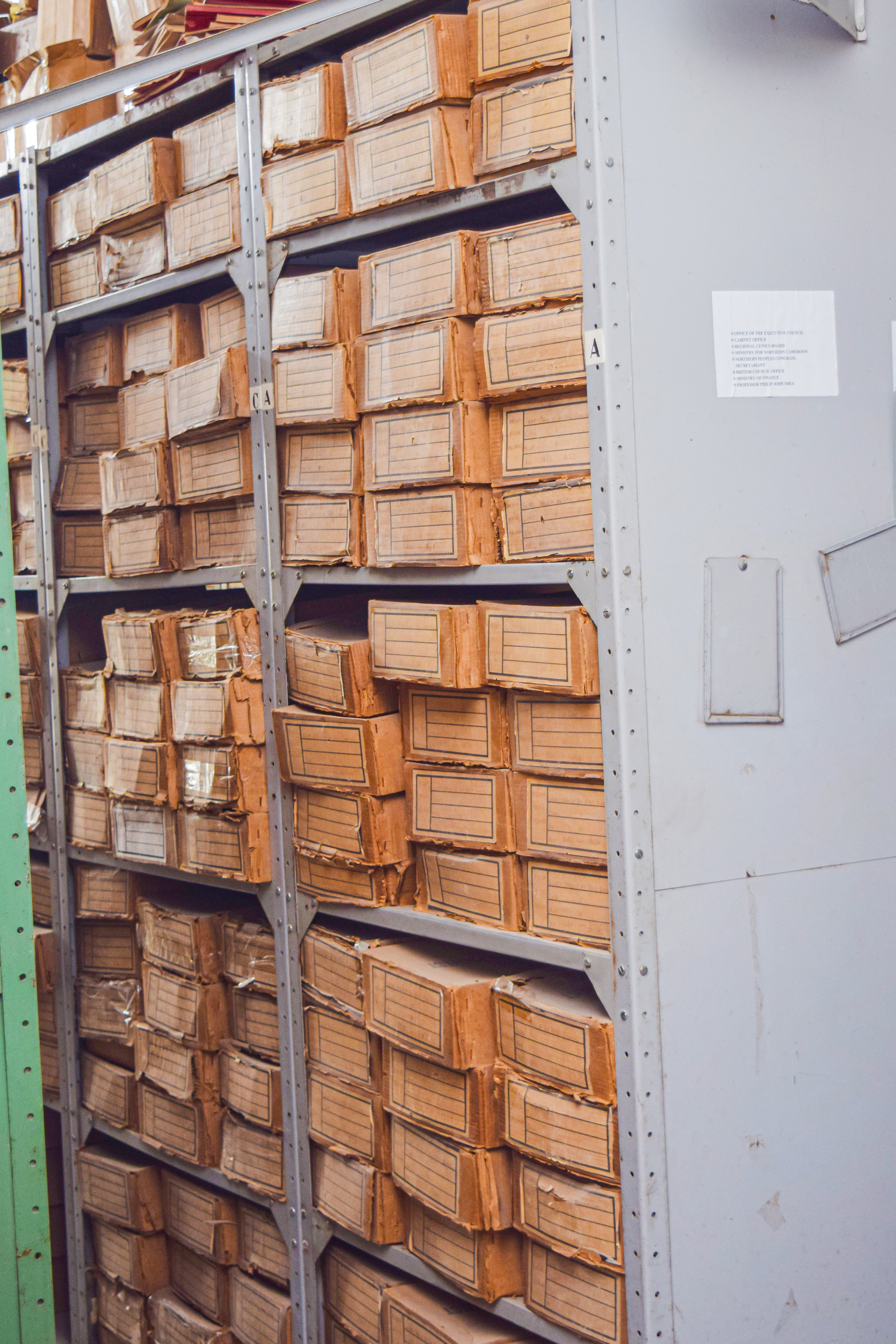
Storage unit of Arewa House Archive

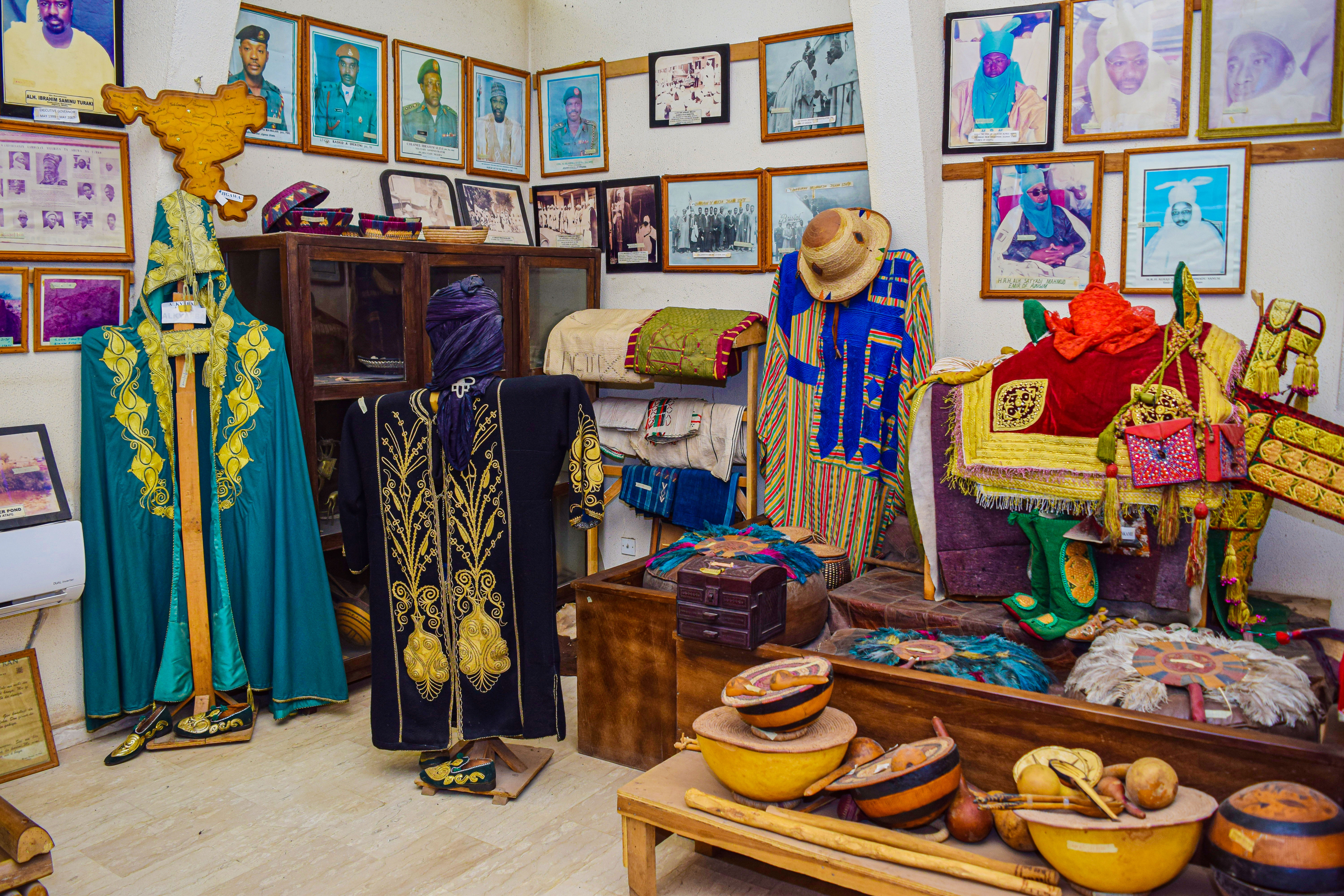
Benue state gallery at Arewa House Museum

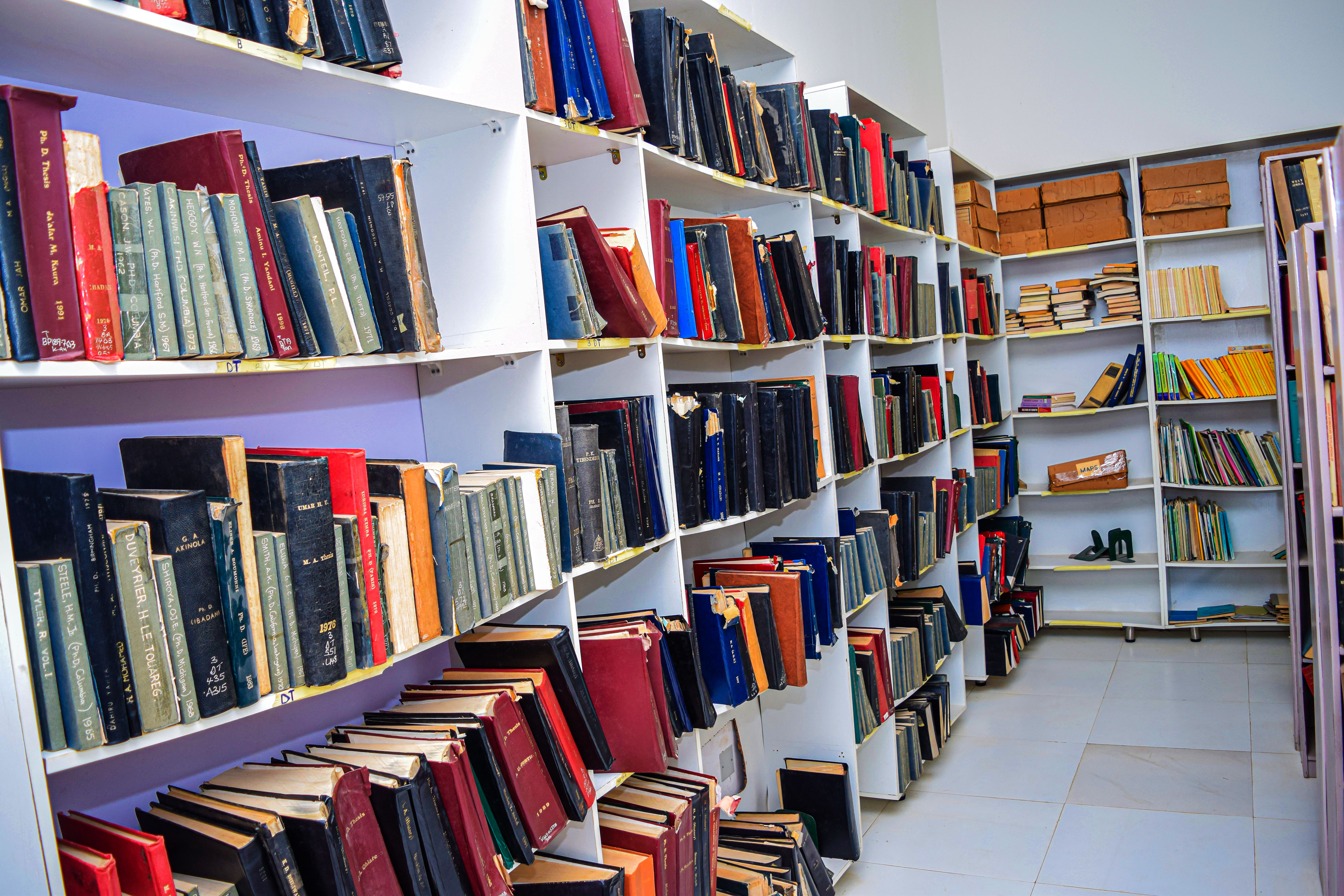
Thesis and dissertation unit of Arewa House Library

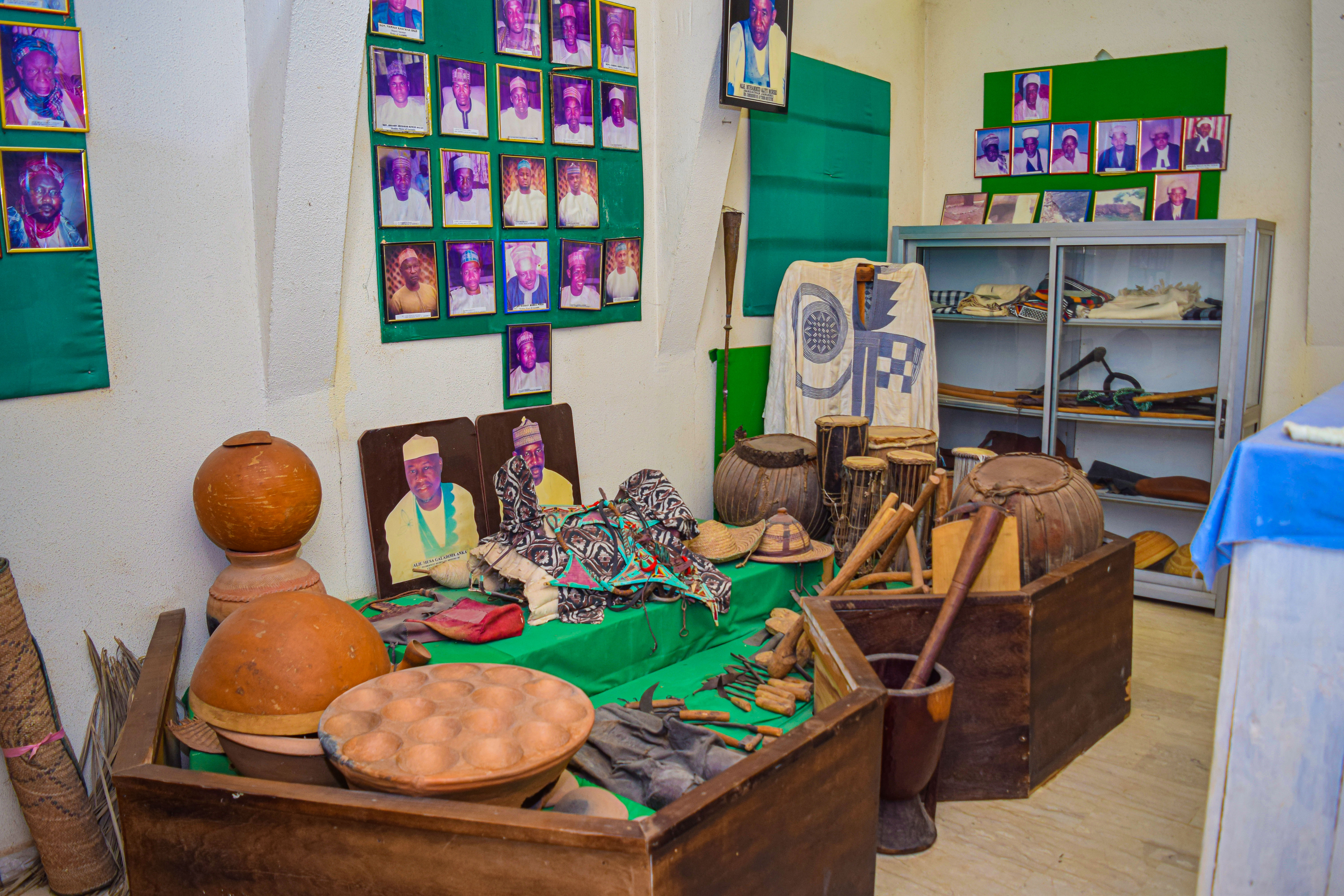
Katsina state gallery of Arewa House Museum

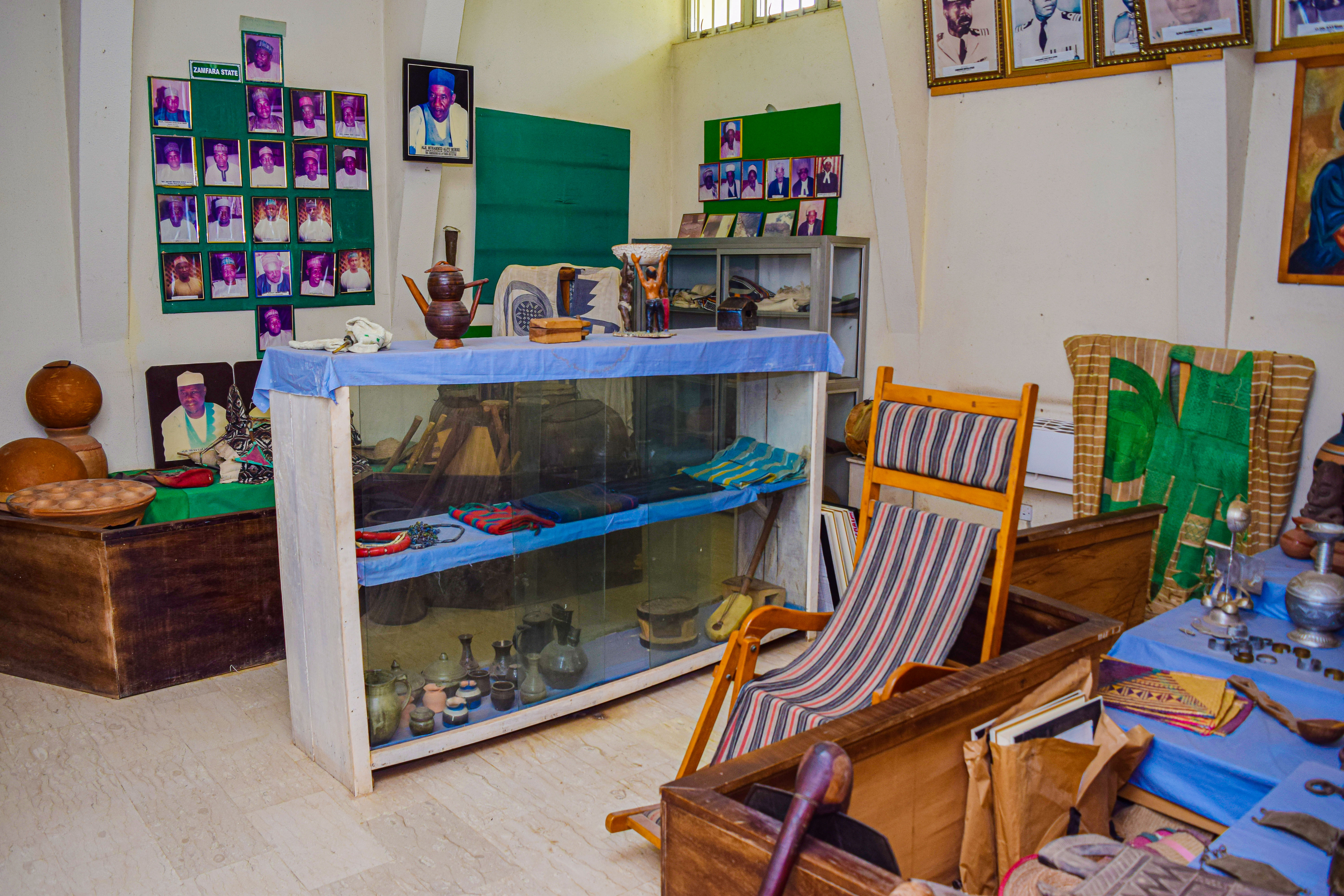
Zamfara state gallery at Arewa House Museum

== Bibliography ==
- Bashir Ikara (1988). Arewa House Profile: A Synopsis of Research Promotion and Development in the Centre for Research and Historical Documentation, Ahmadu Bello University, Kaduna. Northern Nigerian Publishing Company. ISBN 978-978-169-281-9.
- Abdullahi Mahadi; George Amale Kwanashie (1 January 1999). Leadership, Accountability, and the Future of Nigeria: Arewa House Lectures in Honour of Alhaji (Sir) Ahmadu Bello, Sardauna of Sokoto, and Premier of the Northern Region of Nigeria. Arewa House, Ahmadu Bello University. ISBN 978-978-2368-79-9.

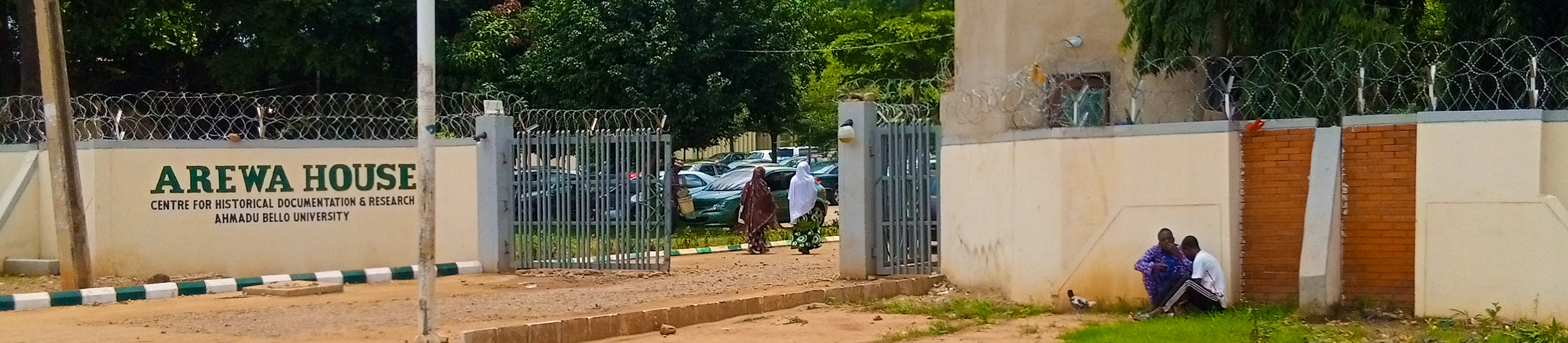
Second gate of Arewa House from west side, facing Zaria Road
