= Mahmud Modibbo Tukur =

Dr Mahmud Modibbo Tukur
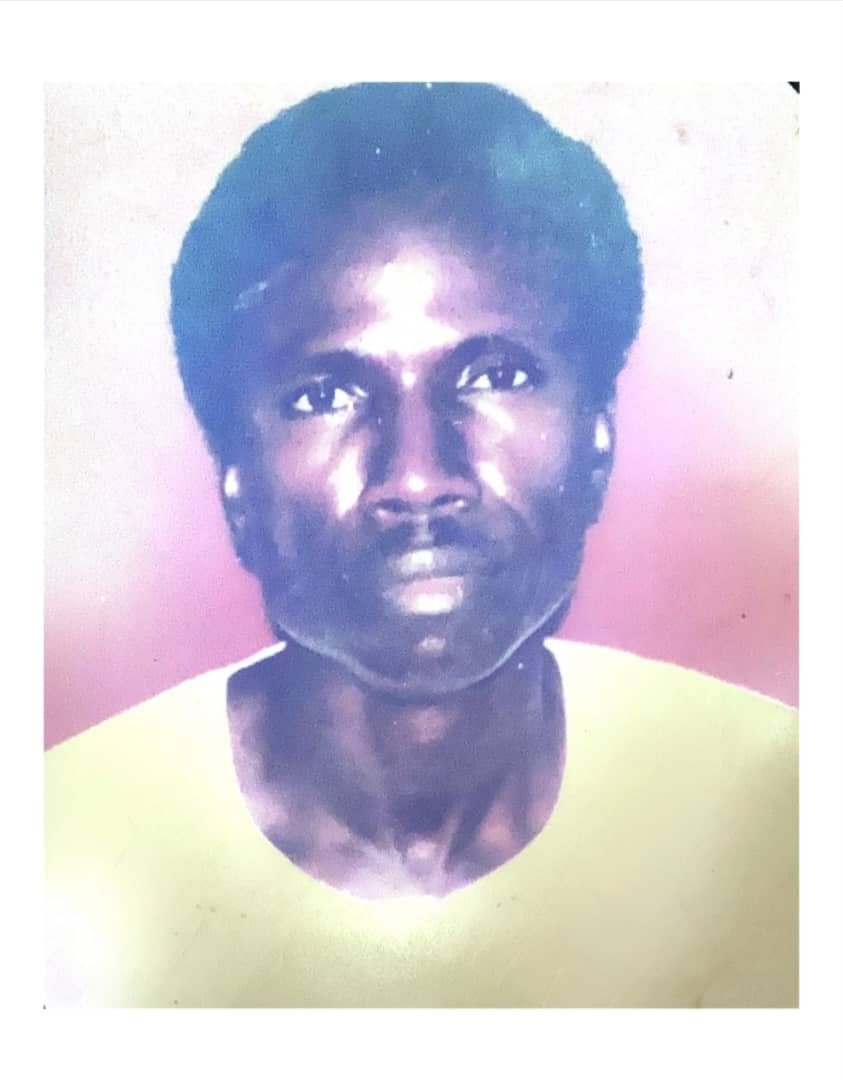
- Born: 1944; Yola
- Died: 15 November 1988 (aged 43–44); Zaria
- Burial place: Kaduna
- Spouse: Fadimatu Zara'u Dahiru
- Children: Hauwa-Inna, Rukaiya-Dada, Usman-Shehu, Zubairu-Ahidjo, Hamid-Bawuro: Grandchildren; Abdullahi-Khalifa, Fatima-Zara, Zainab, Ummul-Kulthum (Nabila), Ummul-Kulthum (Hanan), Maimuna-Amal
- Relatives: Bashiru Tukur, Mustapha Aminu (Galadima Adamawa), Iya Abubakar

Academic background
- Education: Ahmadu Bello University
- Thesis: The Imposition of British Colonial Domination on the Sokoto Caliphate, Borno and Neighbouring States (1897-1914): A Reinterpretation of Colonial Sources (1979)
- Academic advisors: Abdullahi Smith; Yusufu Bala Usman

Mahmud Modibbo Tukur (1944–1988) was a Nigerian historian, scholar and the 4th National President of the Academic Staff Union of Universities (ASUU). Tukur was the Head of the Department of History and Dean of the Faculty of Arts and Social Sciences at Ahmadu Bello University when he died on 15 November 1988 in Zaria.

== Life ==
During his time at Ahmadu Bello University, he met and studied under some influential Historians like Professor Abdullahi Smith and Dr. Yusufu Bala Usman who jointly supervised his doctoral dissertation on “The Imposition of British Colonial Domination on the Sokoto Caliphate, Borno and Neighbouring States (1897-1914): A Reinterpretation of Colonial Sources”. Originally, Tukur's topic was on the role of Emirs in 20th century Northern Nigeria but during his research he decided to change the topic. The major influence in his decision was "the prevalent misrepresentation of the nature of the societies and polities of Northern Nigeria before British colonisation, and the consequent justification/rationalisation of British colonial conquest as contained in studies by Margey Perham, Robert Heussler, S.J. Hogben, A.H.M. Kirk-Greene, H.S. Hogendorn and others". A particular study he singled out as a major factor was Abel.O. Anjorin's doctoral dissertation which was submitted to the University of London in 1965. As Tukur continued his study, a panel of examiners upgraded his thesis from an MA to a PhD after being impressed with his work. Dr. Yusufu Bala Usman stated that the study was "the best PhD thesis written by anyone, anywhere in the world, on any aspect of Nigerian history since 1960".

As a Trade Unionist, Mahmud Tukur participated and led a number of protests starting from 1981. In that year, a student crisis over allegations that food contracts were mismanaged, as part of a committee tasked with investigating the crisis, he strongly condemned the authorities who were trying to blame the student leaders and lecturers. This led him to start getting more involved in university politics later becoming vice president and later President of ASUU. Later that same year, he led the first ASUU nation-wide strike since the era of Yakubu Gowon's government regarding university autonomy and democracy. ASUU also demanded the reinstatement of the lecturers who were dismissed for their involvement in the Ali-Must-Go protests of 1978. Under his leadership, ASUU established close ties to the other major trade unions in the country like the Nigeria Labour Congress (NLC) and the National Association of Nigerian Students (NANS). In 1984, Dr.Mahmud Tukur was invited by the Soviet trade union Educational and Scientific Workers’ Union (ESWU) to the USSR but could not attend sending former ASUU National President Prof. Biodun Jeyifo instead to represent ASUU.

== Death ==
On 15 November 1988, his body was found near his car along the Zaria-Kaduna road. His death was never investigated.

== Works ==
- Mahmud Modibbo Tukur: British Colonisation of Northern Nigeria, 1897-1914. A Reinterpretation of Colonial Sources. Dakar, Amalion Publishing, 2016. ISBN 9782359260472
- The Essential Mahmud. Selected Writings of Mahmud Modibbo Tukur, edited by Dr.Tanimu Abubakar. Zaria, Abu Press, 1990 WorldCat
