= Sani Ahmed Yauta =

Acting Vice chancellor Gombe State University

- Born: October 8, 1974 (age 52); Malam Sidi, Kwami LGA, Gombe State, Nigeria
- Occupations: Academic, university administrator
- Years active: 2006–present
- Organization: Gombe State University
- Known for: Vice-Chancellor of Gombe State University
- Title: Professor
- Awards: Fellow, Chartered Institute of Administrators; Fellow, Institutes of Corporate Administrators, Fellow, Institutes of Industrialist and Corporate Administrators

Academic background
- Education: University of Maiduguri; Bayero University; Ahmadu Bello University

Academic work
- Discipline: Educational Management and Finance
- Institutions: Gombe State University
- Main interests: Higher Education Management and Finance

Sani Ahmed Yauta is a Nigerian academic and university administrator who serves as the Vice-Chancellor of Gombe State University (GSU) in Gombe, Nigeria. He was appointed to the position on 27 August 2025 by Gombe State Governor Muhammadu Inuwa Yahaya, following his tenure as Acting Vice-Chancellor Previously, he held the role of Deputy Vice-Chancellor (Academic) at the institution

== Early life and education ==
Sani Ahmed Yauta was born on 8 October 1974 in Malam Sidi village, Kwami Local Government Area of Gombe State, Nigeria. He earned a Bachelor of Science (B.Sc.) in Economics from University of Abuja in 2004. He bagged his Master of Education (M.Ed.) in Educational Administration and Planning from the University of Maiduguri in 2012. In 2015, he earned his PhD University of Colombo, Sri Lanka

== Academic career ==
Yauta began his academic career as a Graduate Assistant at Gombe State University in 2006, where he rose through the ranks to become a Professor of Educational Management and Finance.

== Administrative career ==
In 2024, Yauta was appointed Acting Vice-Chancellor of Gombe State University. In 2015, he matriculated over 200 pioneer students of the newly established Dukku Campus for the Faculty of Environmental Sciences and announced that over 4,000 students had benefited from the Nigerian Education Loan Fund (NELFUND) On 27 August 2025, Gombe State Governor Muhammadu Inuwa Yahaya approved Yauta's appointment as the substantive Vice-Chancellor of Gombe State University, succeeding Abdullahi Mahmud Haruna. As Vice-Chancellor, Yauta has advocated for local production of anti-venom in Nigeria to address public health concerns in rural areas like Kaltungo in Gombe State.
