= Federal Medical Centre, Gombe =

Federal Medical Centre in Nigeria

Federal Teaching Hospital Gombe
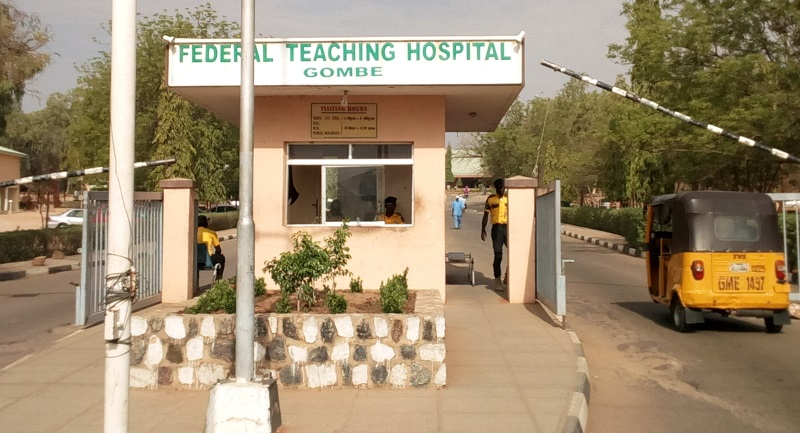

Geography
- Location: Gombe, Northeast, Gombe State, Nigeria

History
- Founded: 1996

Links
- Website: https://fthgombe.gov.ng/
- Lists: Hospitals in Nigeria
- Other links: Federal Medical Centre

Federal Medical Centre, Gombe now Federal Teaching Hospital, Gombe is a federal government of Nigeria medical centre located in Gombe, Gombe State, Nigeria. The current chief medical director is Prof. Yusuf Mohammed Abdullahi. MBBS, FMCPath, MPA (GSU).

== Background ==
The Federal Medical Centre, Gombe was established in 1996. It has a 500 bed-capacity.

Gombe is the capital of Gombe State which is one of the 36 states of Nigeria. It is located between latitude 100° and 110° north, within the savannah region. It has a population of about 2.1 million people and an area of 18,000 km². The temperature averages 30°C with an annual rainfall of 52 cm.

The hospital was established in 1996 by the federal government, but moved to the present site on 22 May, 2000. It was built by the former Bauchi State Government through a loan obtained from the African Development Bank (ADB) to serve as a tertiary referral centre undertaking service, research and training for the then former state. When Gombe State was created, it inherited the hospital and when the federal government decided to establish medical centres in states that do not have a teaching hospital, Gombe state automatically became a beneficiary. Consequently, the hospital was transferred to the federal government who converted it to a federal medical centre in January 1999. President Olusegun Obasanjo commissioned the centre on November 23, 2000. Dr. Abubakar Ali-Gombe was the pioneer medical director of the hospital followed by Prof. Aliyu Usman El-Nafaty, Dr. Saidu Abubakar, Dr. Yahaya Saidu Alkali and currently, prof. Yusuf Mohammed Abdullahi.

With the establishment of a college of medicine by the Gombe State University, the Gombe State Government under the leadership of the state governor Ibrahim Hassan Dankwambo approached the federal government to use the facility as a teaching hospital. President Goodluck Jonathan, gave approval on the 16th August 2013. The hospital was then redesignated by the Minister of Health Prof. Onyebuchi Chukwu as Federal Teaching Hospital, Gombe with Dr. Sai'du Abubakar as the chief medical director.

Currently, the centre has in its employment medical doctors, nurses, medical laboratory scientists, pharmacists, physiotherapists, radiographers and other health care professionals in various specialties. Within the short period of operation, its impact is being felt in the whole state and beyond, because of the relative accessibility of Gombe in the North-East sub-region, where many referrals are received from neighboring States.

== Chief medical director ==
The current chief medical director is professor Yusuf Mohammed Abdullahi, a consultant histopathologist and specialist in breast and gynaecology pathology. He is the fifth chief medical director of the hospital, and succeeded late Dr Yahaya Saidu Alkali.

== Departments ==
The centre has the following departments:

- General Medicine
- Surgery
- Orthopaedics
- Paediatrics
- Radiotherapy and Oncology
- Obstetrics & Gynaecology
- Ear, Nose & Throat [ENT]
- Ophthalmology
- Dental Surgery
- Accident & Emergency [A & E]
- General Out-patient [Family Medicine].
- Radiology
- Physiotherapy
- Pharmacy
- Nursing Services

=== Laboratory services ===
- Haematology & Blood group serology (BGS)
- Histopathology
- Chemical Pathology
- Medical Microbiology and Immunology

== Management ==
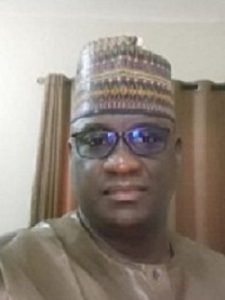
BALA SANI YUSUF DIRECTOR ADMINISTRATION (DA)

- Director Administration (DA): Bala Sani Yusuf (Bsc, MPA, MNIM)
- Deputy Chairman Mac Clinicals (DCMAC): Prof. Aminu Umar Usman: Chief Consultant Radiologist as Acting Deputy Chairman Medical Advisory Committee Clinicals (D-CMAC Clinicals).He replaced Dr. Bukar Lakubbe Yakubu (MBBS, FMCS, FMCorthe)
- Chairman Medical Advisory Committee (CMAC): Dr Yakubu Lakubbe Bukar Chief Consultant Orthopedic Surgeon as Acting Chairman Medical Advisory Committee he replaced Prof. Sani Adamu (MBBS, FMCPath, CHEMPATH)
- Deputy Chairman MAC Research and Training (DCMAC): Dr Halima Usman Faruk: Senior Consultant Obstetrics and Gynaecologist as Acting Deputy Chairman Medical Advisory Committee Research and Training (Agt. D-CMAC R&T),she took over from Prof. Adamu Danladi Bojude (MBBS, FWACS, FMCR, MSPH, PhD)
