= Bala Usman =

Nigerian academics and politicians

Yusufu Bala Usman
- Born: 1945; Musawa, Katsina Province, Northern Region, British Nigeria
- Died: 24 September 2005 (aged 59–60)
- Occupation: Historian
- Children: 7, including Hadiza Bala Usman
- Relatives: Muhammadu Dikko (grandfather); Usman Nagogo (uncle); Hassan Katsina (cousin)

Academic background
- Education: Ahmadu Bello University
- Thesis: The Transformation of Katsina, 1796-1903: the overthrow of the Sarauta system and the establishment and evolution of the Emirate (1974)
- Doctoral advisor: Abdullahi Smith

Academic work
- Discipline: History
- Sub-discipline: Nigerian historiography
- Notable students: Garba Nadama; Mahmud Modibbo Tukur
- Main interests: African history

Yusufu Bala Usman (1945 – 24 September 2005) was a Nigerian historian and politician, who was one of the scholars who shaped Nigerian historiography. He was the founder of the Centre for Democratic Development, Research and Training at Ahmadu Bello University, Zaria.

== Life ==
Usman was born in 1945 in Musawa in Katsina Province, Colonial Nigeria. His father was Durbin Katsina (a traditional title with kingmaker status in the Katsina Emirate) and a brother of Sarkin Katsina Usman Nagogo. His mother was a daughter of Sarkin Kano Abdullahi Bayero. He attended Musawa Junior Primary School, Kankia Senior Primary School, Minna Senior Primary School and Government College, Kaduna. He then went to study at the University Tutorial College and then at University of Lancaster where he completed his studies with a degree in History and Political Science. He returned to Nigeria in 1967 to become a teacher at Barewa College, Zaria where he taught until 1971. Usman started his graduate studies in 1970 at Ahmadu Bello University, earning his PhD degree in 1974. He started lecturing at the university as a part-time lecturer before being promoted to full-time.

During the Nigerian Second Republic, he was briefly the Secretary to the Kaduna State government under the PRP led Balarabe Musa administration.

=== Academic career ===
Usman was a major figure among post colonial historians at Ahmadu Bello University, his outlook on African history involves support for the use of oral and linguistic sources along with written and archaeological sources. He felt all sources are subject to bias and that increased scrutiny of oral sources for distortions and colourings was not extended to many written sources by European writers. To him, the historian cannot be divorced from his education and molding as a scholar and the historicity of the European writers likely influenced some of their writings. Some of his reflections on the writing of African history includes a critique of Heinrich Barth, a respected source among Western scholars, Usman thought Barth was too focused on the physical and genetic characteristics of those he was studying which he felt was a result of the dominant traditions of nineteenth century European history writing.

== Contribution to history ==
Historical paradigm shift: He transformed the study of African history from a focus of tribal studies to a more dynamic understanding of identity and historical processes

=== Major works ===
1. For the Liberation of Nigeria (1979)
2. The Transformation of Katsina 1400-1883 (1981)
3. Nigeria against the I.M.F (1986)
4. The Manipulation of Religion in Nigeria (1987)
5. Co-author of Minority Report and Draft Consultation for the Federal Republic of Nigeria(2019)
6. Edited Several Significant Historical works.

== Key position and organisations ==
- Director of Research for the people's redemption party.
- Contributed to various governmental committees and was involved in international deplomacy.
- Participated in the Nigerian Labour Congress and other political movements.

== Family ==
Usman left behind a wife and six children upon his death. Among the Children is Hadiza Bala Usman.

== Sources ==
- Mamdani, Mahmood (2012). W.E.B. du Bois Lectures : Define and Rule : Native as Political Identity. Boston: Harvard University Press.
