= Abdullahi Mahadi =

Nigerian historian and educationist (1945–2022)

Professor Abdullahi Mahadi
- Born: December 1945; Gwoza, Borno State
- Died: 16 December 2022 (aged 77); Gombe, Gombe State
- Education: B.Sc., M.Sc., Ph.D., Ahmadu Bello University
- Years active: 1967–2022

Abdullahi Mahadi (December 1945 – 16 December 2022) was a historian, educationist, and former Vice-Chancellor of Ahmadu Bello University, Gombe State University, and Gombe State University of Science and Technology.

== Early life and education ==
Abdullahi Mahadi was born in 1945, in Gwoza, Borno State, where he started his elementary school at Warrabe Primary School. He enrolled at Gwoza Central School for his secondary education, and then Government Craft School, Maiduguri. He proceeded to Mubi Teachers’ College for his teaching training before gaining admission to Ahmadu Bello University, Zaria for his Bachelor's degree in History, M.Sc., and Ph.D. in the same field. He also authored 47 books and journals.

== Career ==
He started his career in 1967 as an Assistant Headmaster of Gadamayo Primary School, Gwoza. He was promoted to the position of a Headmaster and transferred to Hambagda Primary School in 1968, and Assistant Education Officer, North-Eastern Government in 1971. In 1984, he joined Ahmadu Bello University as a Senior lecturer in History and subsequently Director of the Northern History Research Scheme, an institute within Ahmadu Bello University.

In 1987, he was appointed Vice-Chancellor, of Ahmadu Bello University, Zaria before joining Gombe State University as the pioneer Vice-Chancellor, 2004. In 2017, he was appointed by the Ibrahim Hassan Dankwambo as the pioneer Vice-Chancellor.

== The Mahadi Foundation Afforestation Project ==
In Nigeria, Abdullahi Mahadi is the face of environmental management and preservation. When he was appointed Vice-Chancellor of the prestigious Ahmadu Bello University in Zaria, he became more prominent in this endeavor. The campus setting underwent a complete renovation, making it the envy of universities around the world. A highly supportive environment for learning and research was established due to Professor Mahadi's tree planting and campus beautification projects. He had already accomplished this in the locations/institutions he previously oversaw: the University's Faculty of Arts and Social Sciences and the Arewa House in Kaduna. Professor Abdullahi Mahadi has facilitated the planting of 1,500,000 trees across the state since 2004 when he was appointed the founding vice chancellor of the Gombe State University. The Gombe State University was the first to benefit, in terms of fostering a good atmosphere. Professor Abdullahi as well strongly believes that everyone should be concerned about this tide. The project has received the greatest support, as the Mahadi Initiative/Foundation is inundated with requests from individuals, communities, public and private institutions, religious organizations, etc. for tree planting, seedlings, and/or environmental beautification throughout the year.

== Death ==
Mahadi died in Gombe on December 16, 2022 aged 77. His funeral prayer according to Islamic rites took place at the Gombe Central Masjid, the emir's palace Gombe.
