= Gombe State University =

Public university in Nigeria

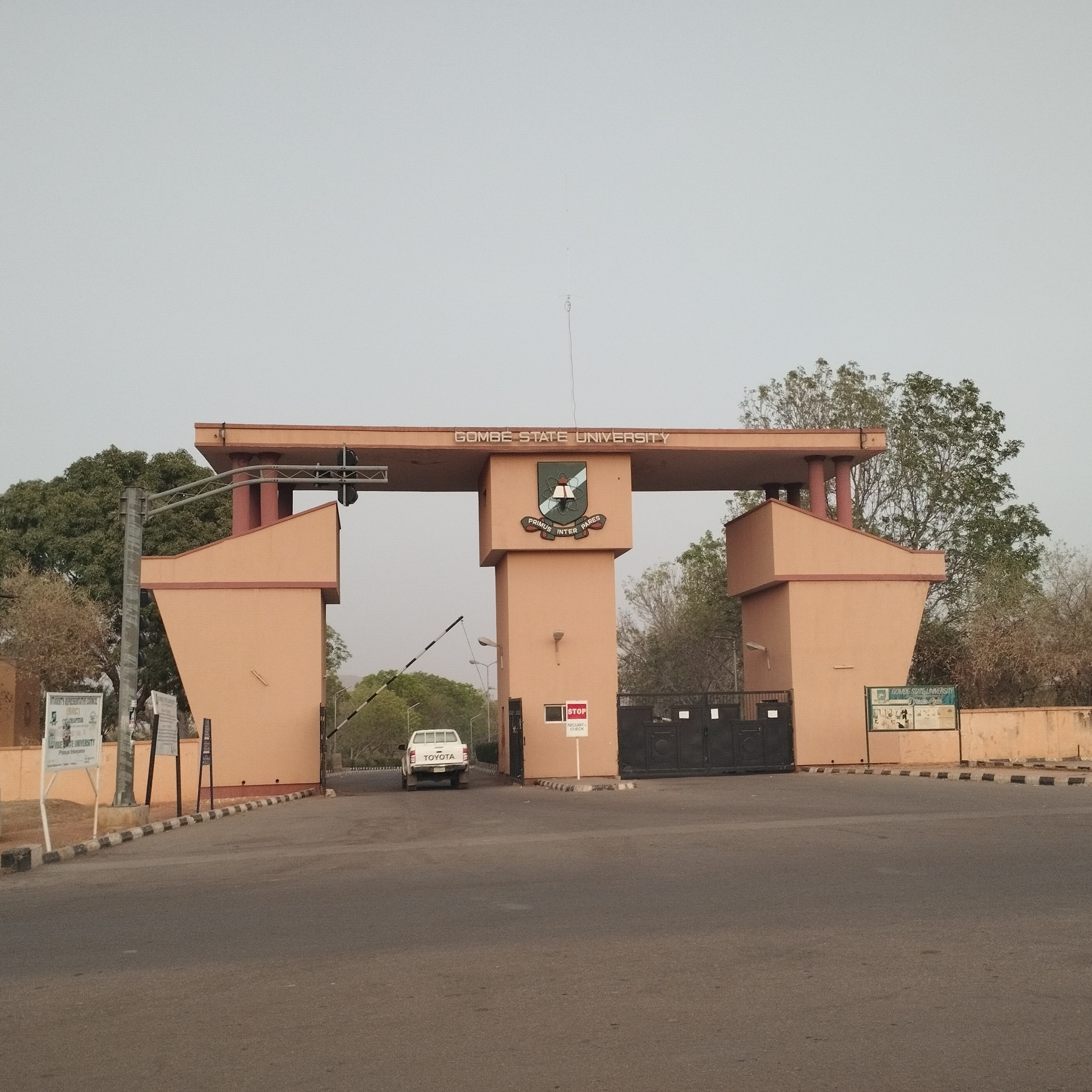
- Motto: Primus Inter Pares
- Type: Public
- Established: 2004
- Chancellor: Abubakar Shehu-Abubakar
- Vice-Chancellor: Sani Ahmed Yauta
- Location: Gombe, Nigeria, Gombe State, Nigeria; 10.3042°N 11.1728°E
- Campus: Urban
- Website: gsu.edu.ng

Gombe State University (GSU) is located in Tudun Wada, an area in Shamaki Ward, Gombe, Gombe State, Nigeria. It is located in the Northern part of Nigeria. It is a member of the Association of Commonwealth Universities. The state university has a chancellor and 11-members of the governing council, as well as principal officers and management staff. Abdullahi Mahadi was the first vice chancellor of the university.

== Historical background ==
Gombe State University was set up during the administration of Governor Mohammed Danjuma Goje in 2003. The state's ministry of education had set up a 35-member committee of stakeholders who reported to the state executive council to establish a state owned university. The state executive council approved the constitution of a 24-member technical planning committee to oversee the affairs of the university at the time of its inception. The university produces graduates to enable them to engage in productive political, economic, and social activities. The university has no religious affiliation. As a state-owned university, it is comparably affordable, with low tuition and accommodation costs.

== Vice Chancellors ==
Professor Abdullahi Mahadi was the first Vice Chancellor of the university. Prior to joining Gombe State University as its pioneer vice chancellor when the university was established in 2004, Mahdi had served in the same capacity at Ahmadu Bello University, Zaria for a period of four years. He had been the Vice Chancellor of Gombe State University since its inception in 2005 until 2014, when the then governor of Gombe State, Ibrahim Dankwambo, appointed Ibrahim Umar as the next Vice Chancellor of the university.

Before his appointment, Professor Ibrahim Umar was the Dean, Faculty of Science and Postgraduate School of the university. He was born in 1958 in Nafada Local Government Area, Gombe State.

Professor Aliyu Usman El-Nafaty was appointed as the 3rd Vice Chancellor of Gombe State University, succeeding professor I.M Umar after the expiration of his tenure in 2019. And his tenure was expired in 2024.

Upon the successful completion of El-Nafaty's tenure the Executive Governor of Gombe State Muhammad Inuwa Yahaya appointed Professor Sani Ahmed Yauta as the Acting Vice Chancellor Gombe State University in October 2024.

== Faculties ==
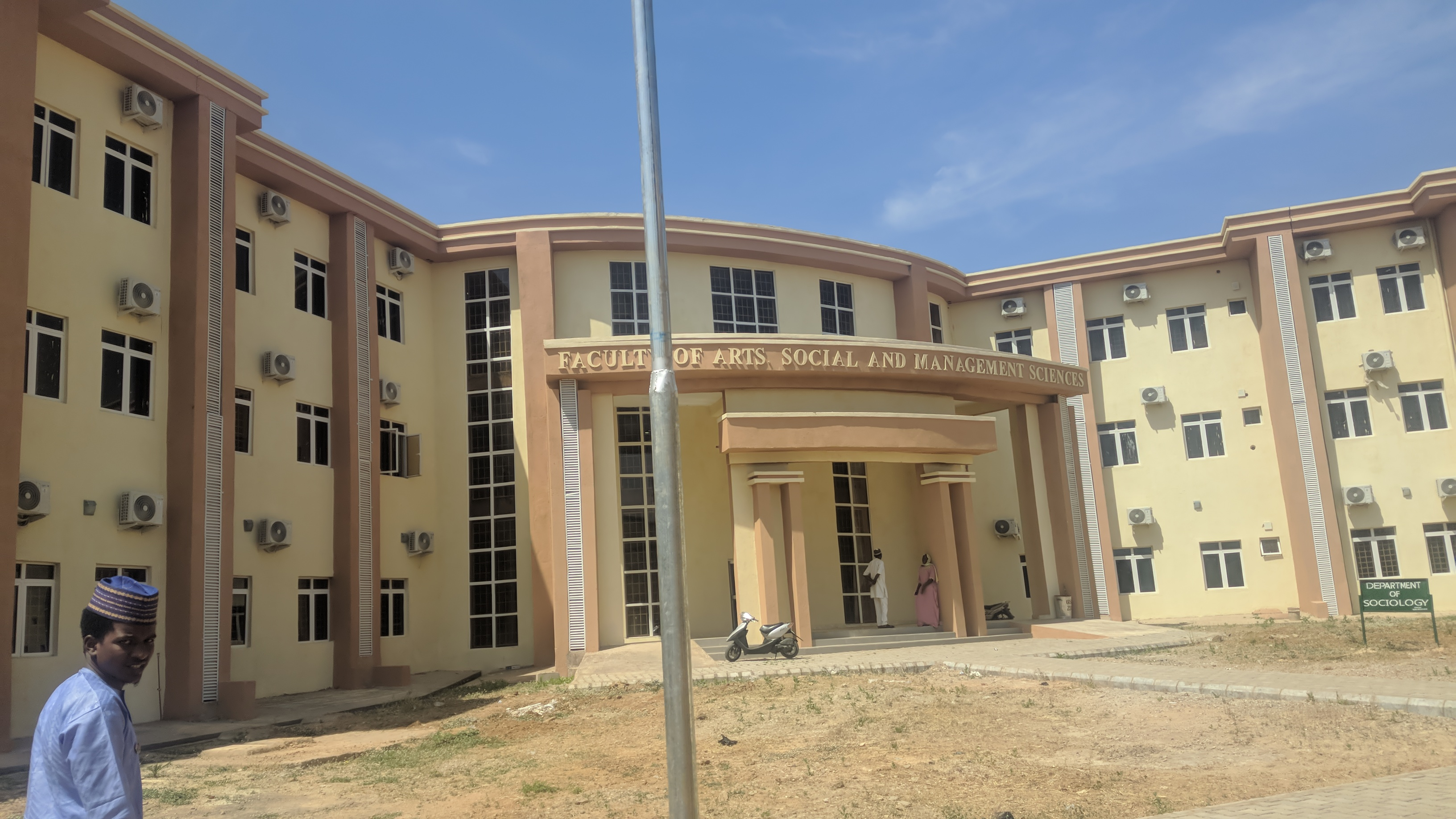
faculty of Art and social science

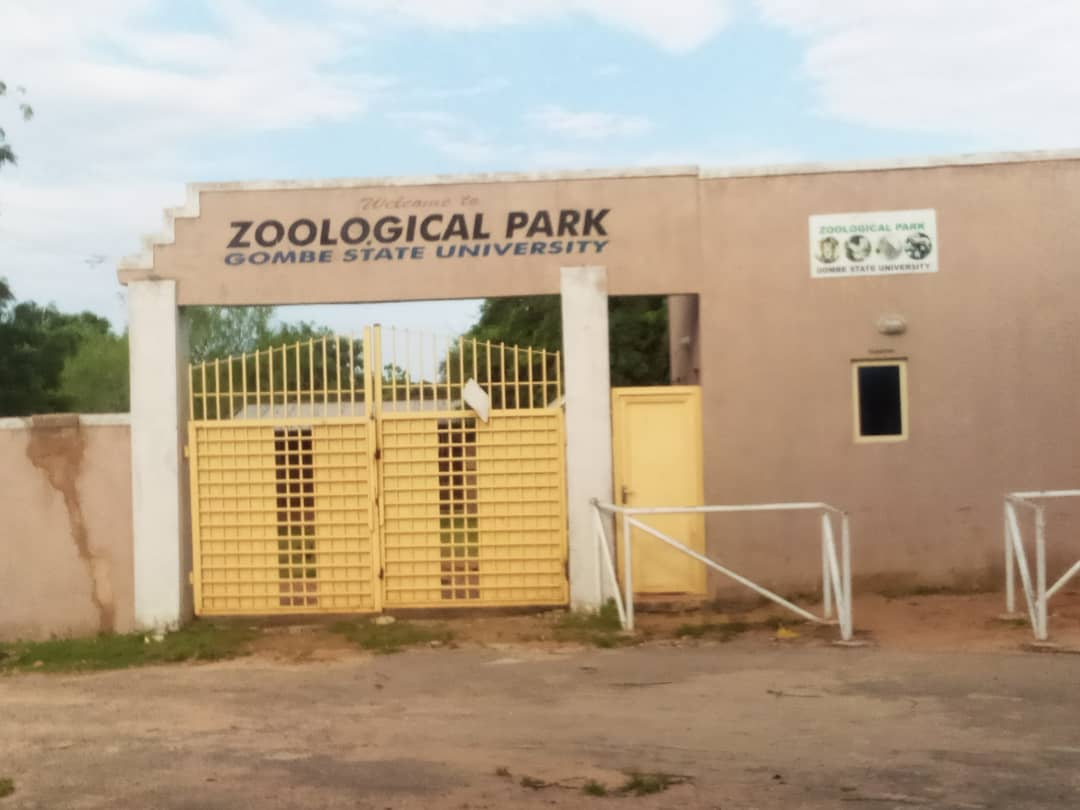
Zoological park

Faculties and courses offered by the university:

=== Faculty of Arts and social science ===
Departments under faculty of arts and social sciences

- Accounting
- Business Administration
- Political Science
- Economics
- International Relation
- English Language
- Religious Studies
- Sociology
- Library and Information Management
- History
- Public Administration
- Peace and Conflict Resolution
- International Relations

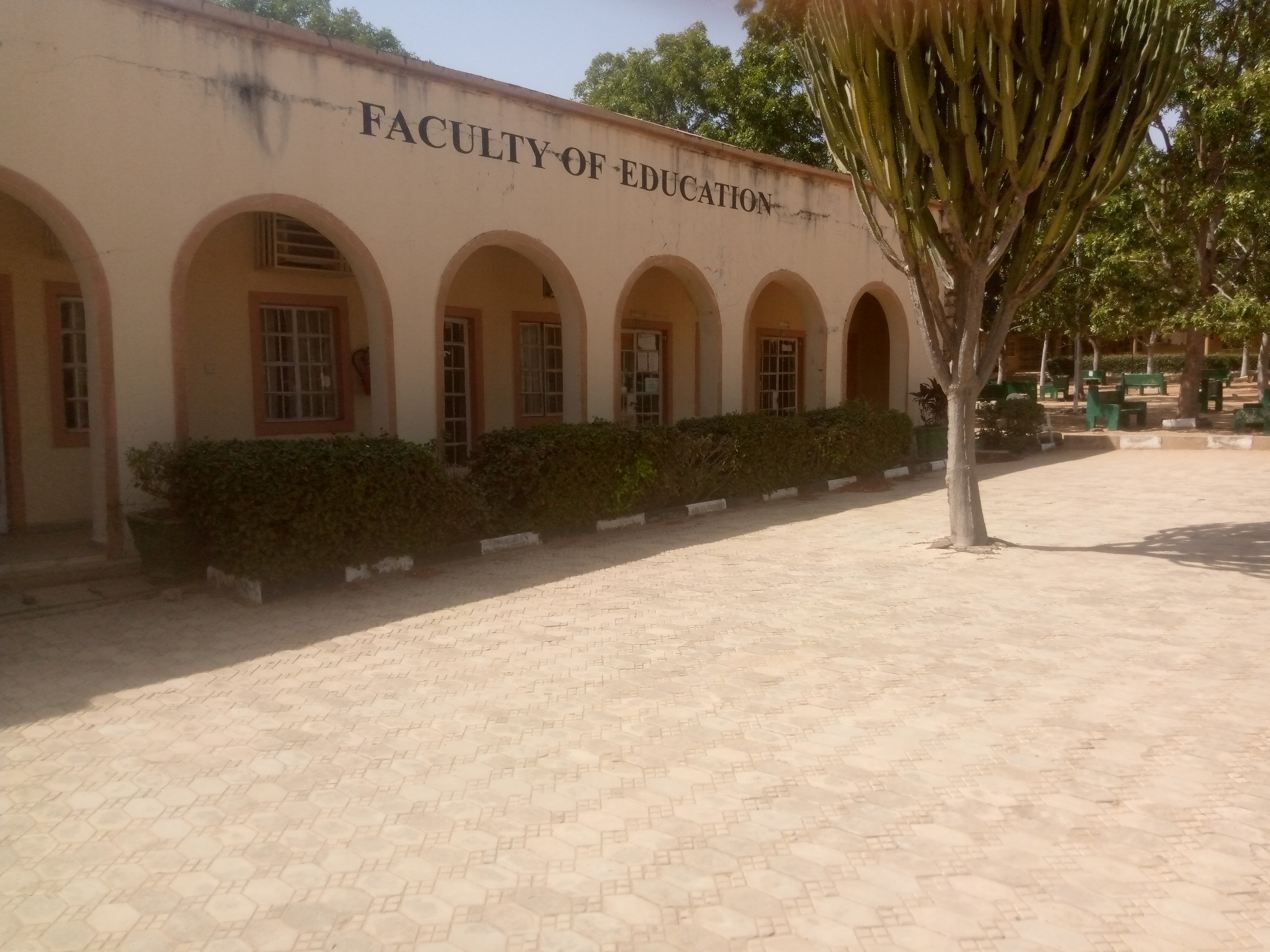
Faculty of education front view

=== Faculty of Education ===
Departments under faculty of education

- Physics and Education
- Biology and Education
- Chemistry and Education
- Geography and Education
- Computer Science and Education
- Mathematics and Education
- Political Science and Education
- English and Education

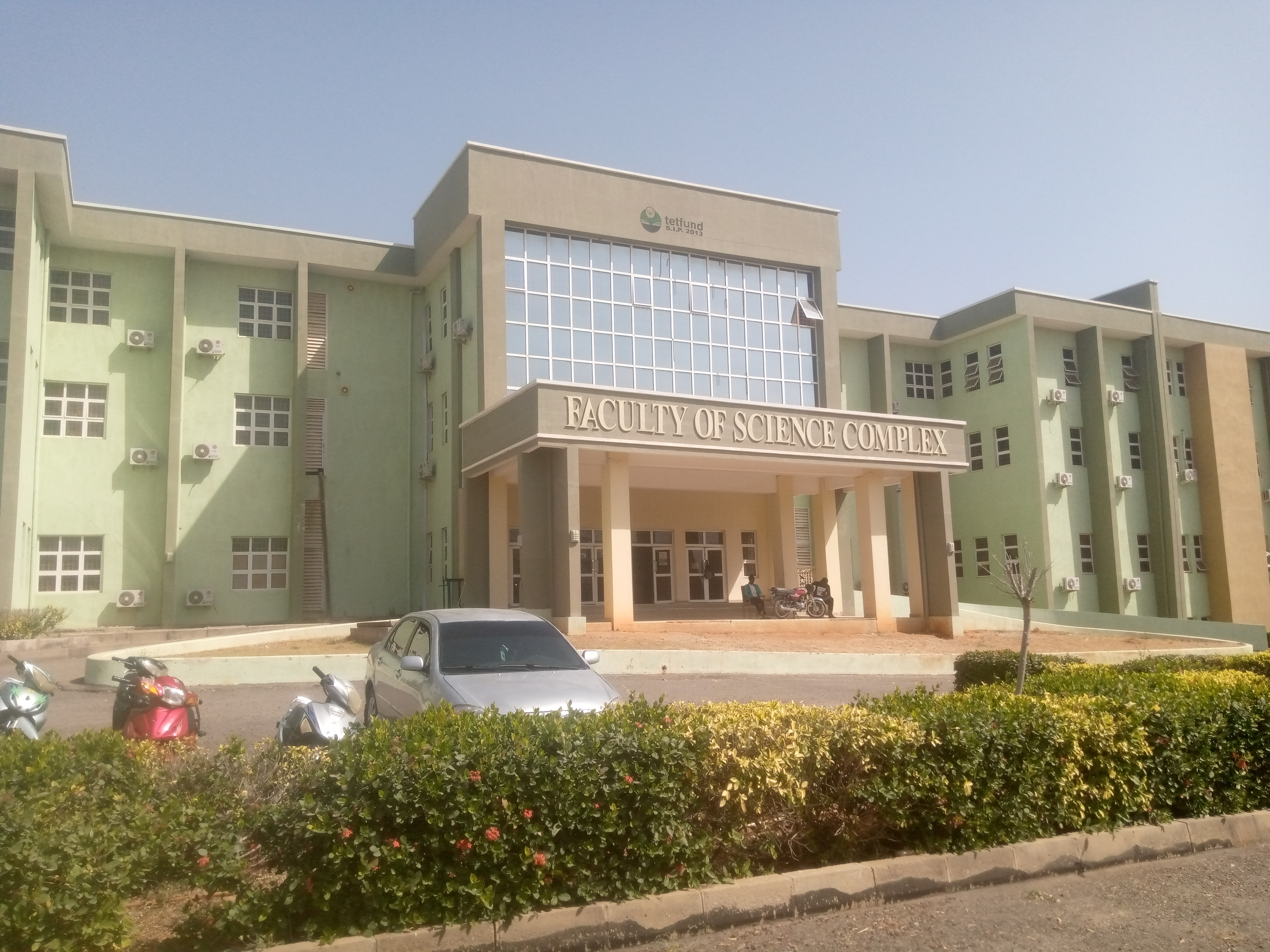
Main entrance of faculty of science

=== Faculty of Environmental Science - Dukku Campus ===
Departments under faculty of Environmental Sciences

- Architecture
- Building Engineering
- Quantity Surveying
- Estate Management

=== Faculty of Science ===
Departments under faculty of science

- Biological Sciences
- Biochemistry
- Botany
- Chemistry
- Computer Science
- Geography
- Geology
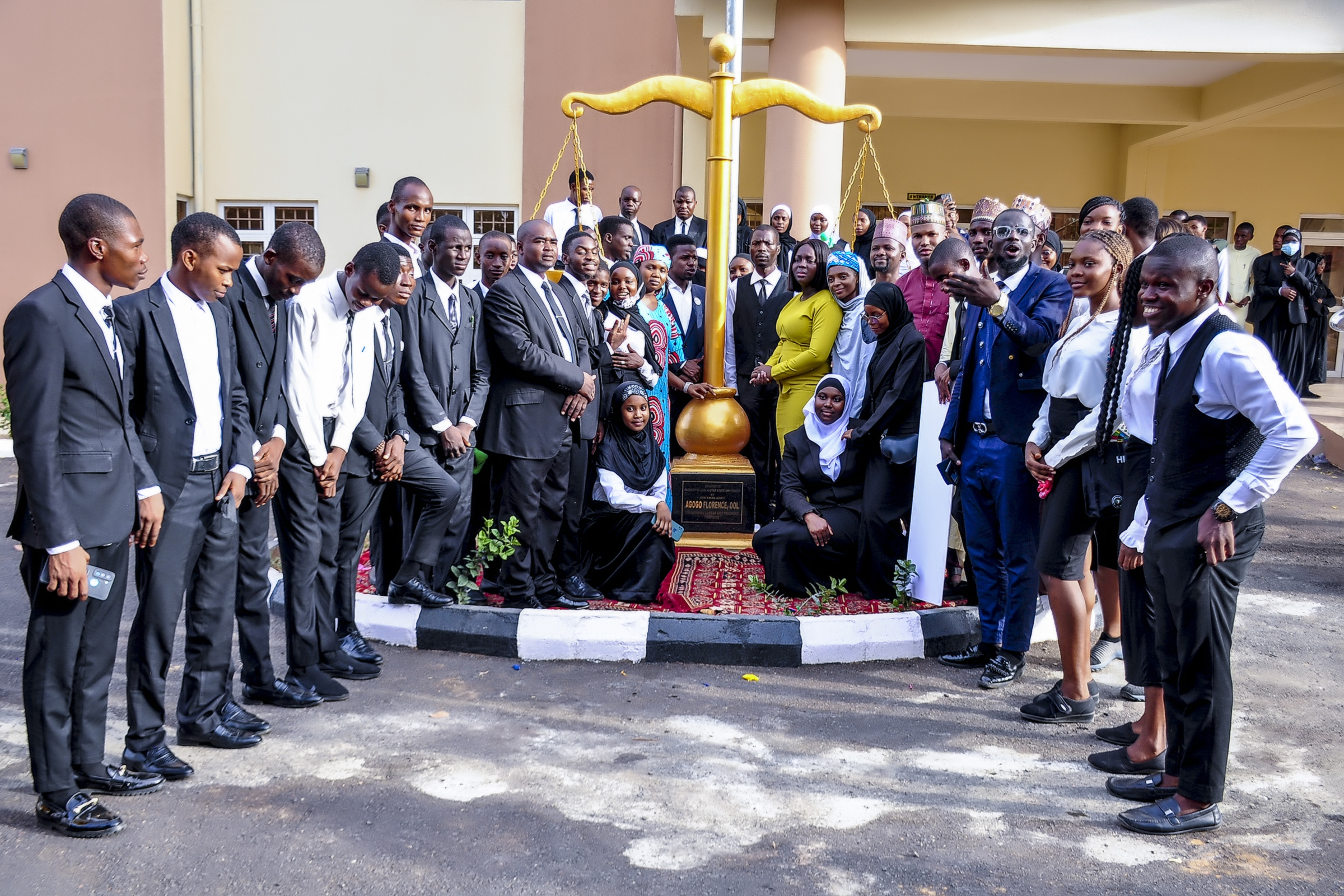
- Cross Section of law Students of GSU
  Mathematics
- Microbiology
- Physics
- Science Laboratory Technology
- Zoology

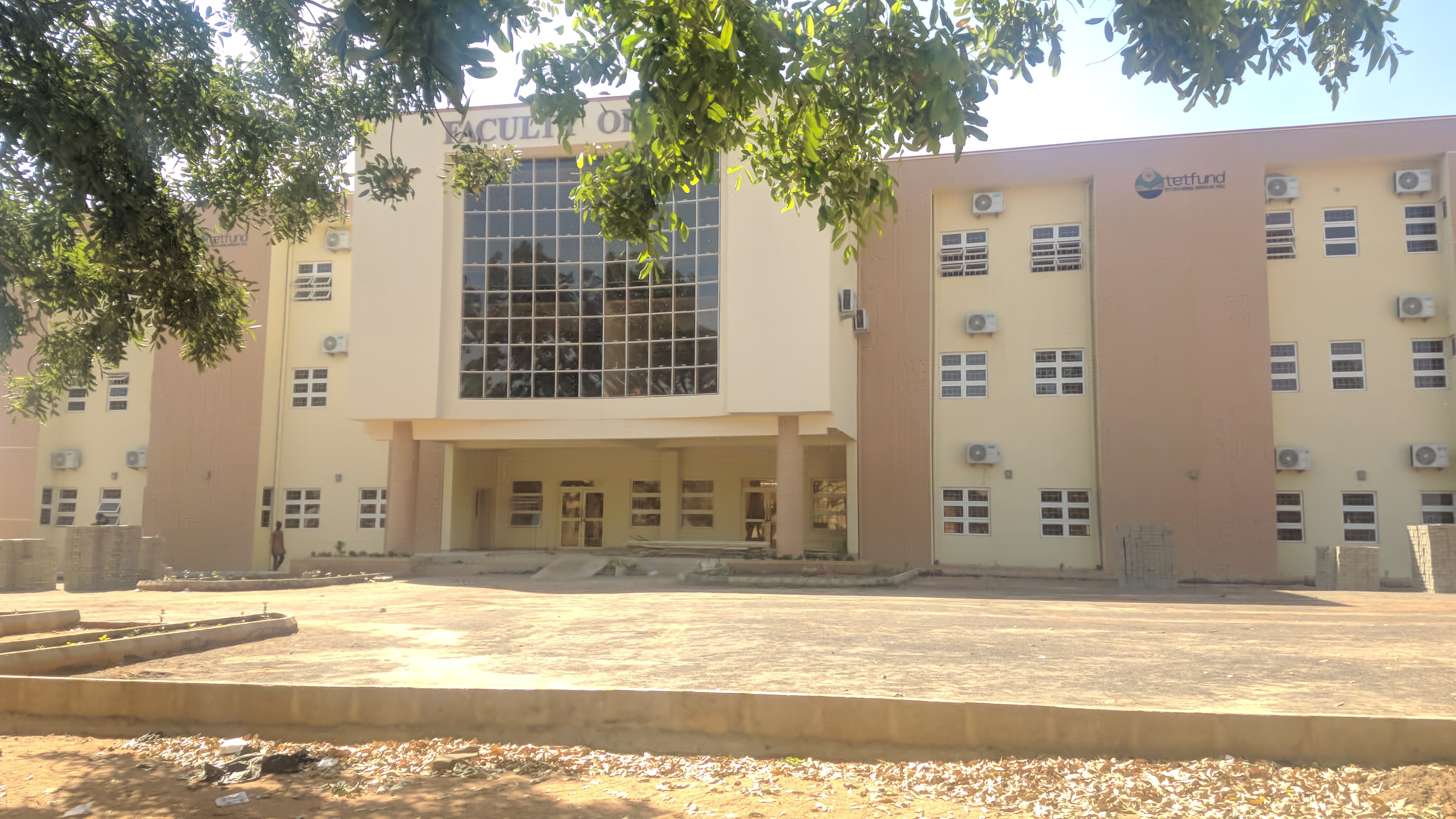
Main entrance of faculty of law

=== Faculty of Law ===
- Shari'a law
- Public law

=== Faculty of Pharmaceutical science ===
Department under faculty of pharmaceutical sciences

- Pharmacognosy and Drug Development
- Pharmaceutics and Pharmaceutical Technology
- Clinical Pharmacy and Pharmacy Practice
- Pharmaceutics and Medicinal Chemistry
- Pharmacology and Therapeutics
- Pharmaceutical Microbiology

=== Faculty of Agriculture - Malam Sidi Campus ===
Department of under faculty of Agriculture

- Fisheries and Aquaculture
- Forestry Resource and Wildlife Management
- Animal Science
- Soil Science
- Agricultural Economics
- Agricultural Extension
- Crop Sciences
- Horticulture and Landscape Management

== Postgraduate school ==
The School of Postgraduate Studies was established following the section 7 (i) a of the Gombe State University Law 2004. While process for its establishment began in 2008/2009, the first School of Postgraduate Board was inaugurated on 30 July 2009. However, three academic programs commenced from 2012/2013 academic session, namely: M.A History, M.Sc. Physics and PGDE. Sequel to expansion in 2014/2015, the School of Postgraduate currently runs sixty-eight programs under three faculties.

== College of Medical Sciences ==
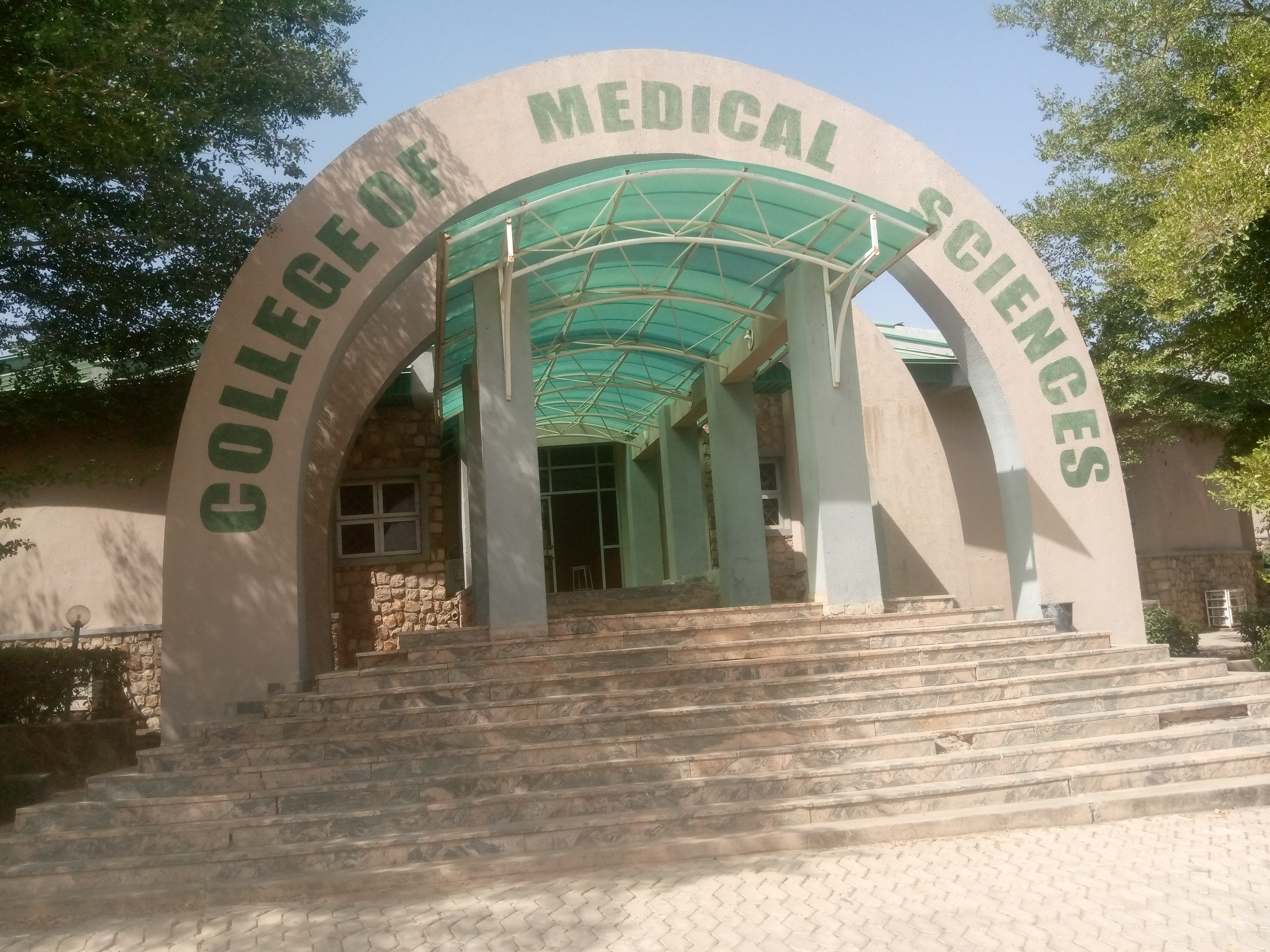
Main entrance of college of medical science Gombe state university

The college of medical science is made up of three faculties;

=== Faculty of basic Medical Sciences ===
Department under faculty of basic medical sciences

- Department of Human Anatomy
- Department of Human Physiology
- Department of Medical Biochemistry
- Department Nursing Sciences
- Department of Pharmacology
- Department of Nutrition and Dietetics

=== Faculty of Basic Clinical Sciences ===
Departments under faculty of basic clinical sciences

- Department of Chemical Pathology
- Department of Clinical Pharmacology &Therapeutics
- Department of Hematology & Blood Transfusion
- Department of Histopathology
- Department of Medical Microbiology & Immunology

=== Faculty of Clinical Sciences ===
Departments under faculty of clinical sciences

- Department of Anaesthesia
- Department of E.N.T
- Department of Internal Medicine
- Department of Community Medicine
- Department of General Surgery
- Department of Paediatrics
- Department of Obstetrics and Gynaecology
- Department of Ophthalmology
- Department o Radiolog

== Library ==
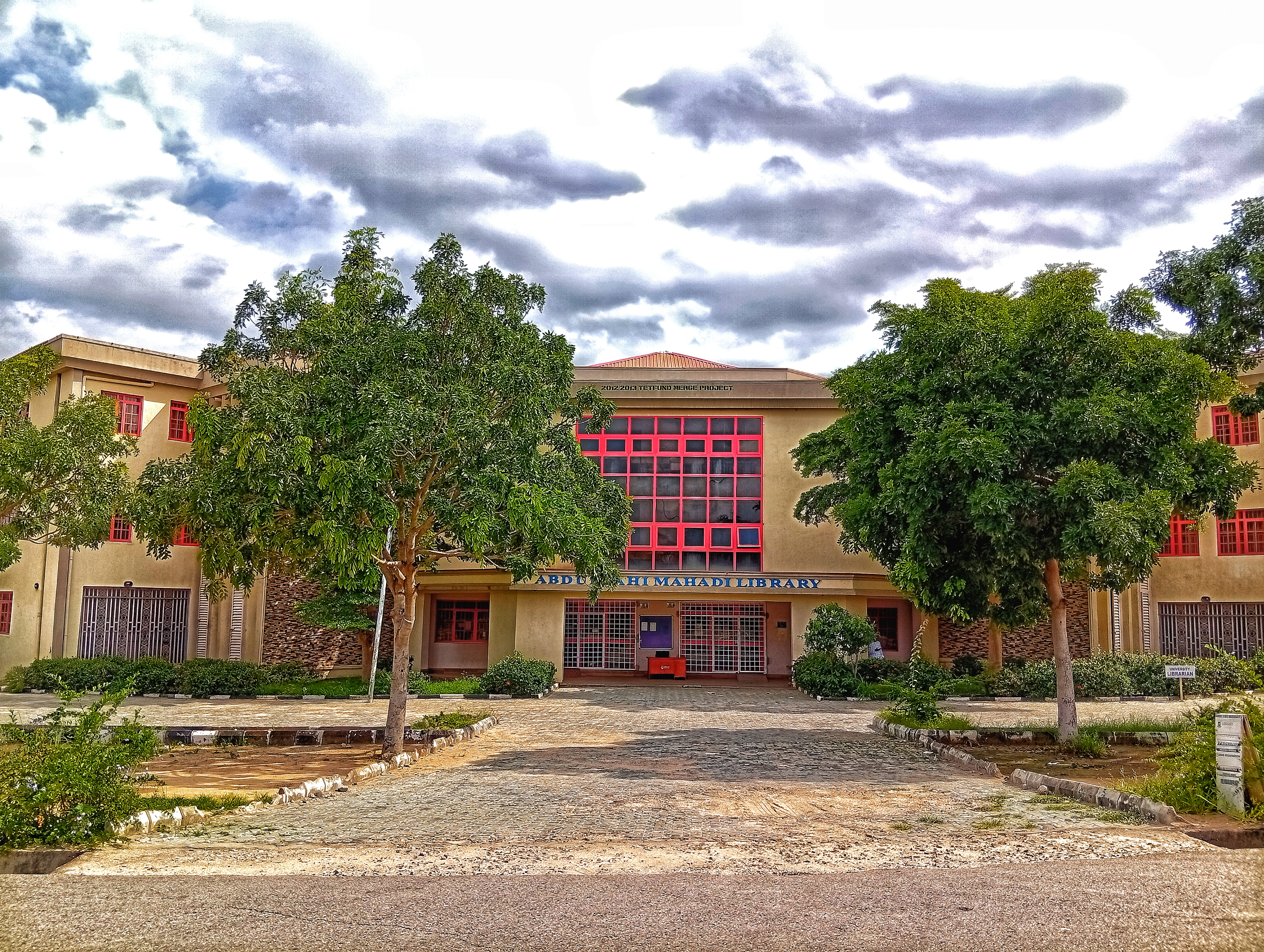
The Gombe State University Library as known Prof. Mahdi University Library

There is one main library in the university. The main library is a two-story building in the main campus, with various offices, departments, and units which house the administrative, technical and other staffs. The library has a large collection with over 52,000 volumes and 12,000 periodical titles, as well as a wide range of online and offline journals. The library is named after Professor Abdullahi Mahdi, the first vice chancellor of the university.

The university's main Library operates branch libraries attached to the Faculties/Departments.

Branch libraries

- Faculty of Law Library
- Faculty of Arts and social sciences library

== See also ==
- Association of Commonwealth Universities
- Nigerian Universities Commission
