= Khamisu Ahmed Mailantarki =

Nigerian politician

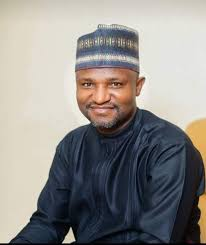

Former House of Representatives
- Constituency: Gombe/Kwami/Funakaye Federal Constituency

Personal details
- Party: New Nigerian People Party (NNPP)

Khamisu Ahmed Mailantarki is a former Member House of Representatives representing Gombe/Kwami/Funakaye constituencies of Gombe state. He made history in 2011 when he emerged as the only legislator from North-East with the highest Number of vote and was the deputy chairman house committee on FCT area council and member of several other committees such as petroleum upstream, internal security, house services, human right, climate changes and global warming, and solid minerals salt. He is the founder of Mailatantarki Football Care Academy.

== Early life and education ==
Khamisu Ahmed Mailantarki was born on 19 June 1975 in Herwagana Quarters, Gombe, Gombe State, Nigeria, to the family of the late Ahmed Mailantarki. He attended Gombe Township Primary School, where he obtained his First School Leaving Certificate, before proceeding to Government Science Secondary School, Gombe, where he earned his Senior Secondary School Certificate (SSCE). He later obtained a Bachelor of Science (B.Sc.) degree before entering politics.

== Football development ==
Mailantarki founded the Mailantarki Football Care Academy, a football academy in Nigeria. The academy trains young football players and has taken part in international youth tournaments. In 2022, its under-19 team won the Dana Cup, an international youth football tournament held in Denmark.

== Political career ==
- Member House of Representatives, Representing Gombe/Kwami/Funakaye 2011-2015
- Gubernatorial aspirant for the 2023 General election under the NNPP
