= Gombe State Polytechnic =

Polytechnic in Nigeria

- Type: Public
- Established: September 27, 2012
- Rector: Dr. Abbas Umar Farouk
- Location: Bajoga, Gombe State, Nigeria
- Campus: Sangaru Campus
- Website: https://gspb.edu.ng/

Gombe State Polytechnic, is a polytechnic located at Bajoga Funakaye LGA of Gombe State, Nigeria.

== History ==
The institution was established from the decision of the state government, which was in tandem with the recommendation of the Committee on Education, on 27 September, 2012. The polytechnic started with 256 students, and it offers Pre-National Diploma and National Diploma in courses at undergraduate levels.

The school was established to bridge the education gap in the state, and is expected to integrate academic, technical and vocational education as benchmarks for the development of the state.

== Schools ==
The polytechnic has the following schools:

- School of Engineering and Engineering Technology
- School of Science and Technology
- School of Management Studies
- School of General Studies

== Courses ==
- Accountancy
- Business Administration and Management
- Office Technology Management
- Public Administration

== Rector ==
Dr. Abbas Umar Farouk
