= Nafada =

- LGA and town
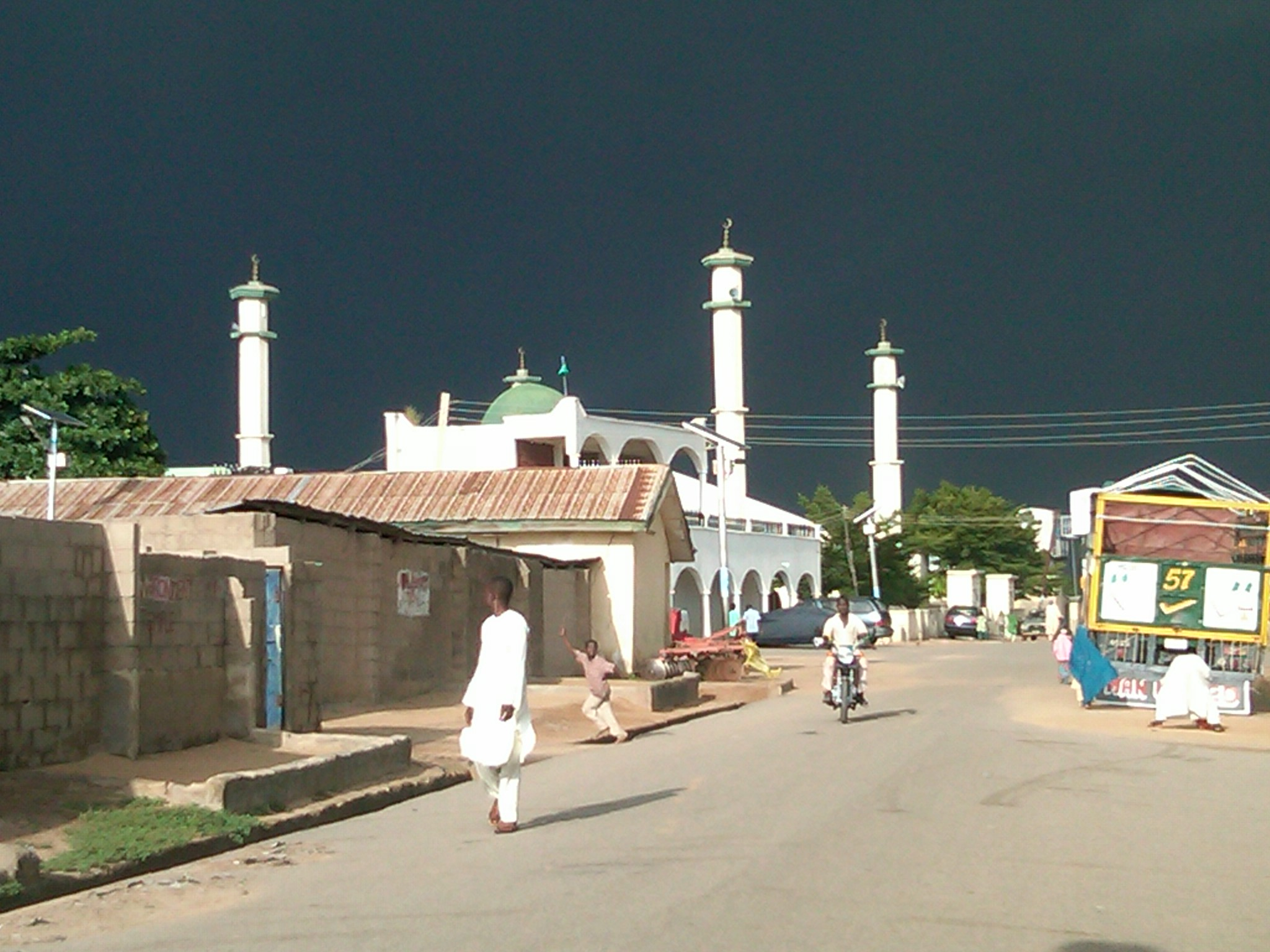
- Motto: The Starlet on The River
- Interactive map of Nafada
- Location in Nigeria
- Coordinates: 11°08′N 11°15′E
- Country: Nigeria
- State: Gombe State

Government
  - Local Government Chairman and the Head of the Local Government Council: Hon. Musa Abubakar

Area
  - Total: 1,586 km^{2} (612 sq mi)

Population (2006 census)
  - Total: 138,185
- Time zone: UTC+1 (WAT)
- 3-digit postal code prefix: 762
- ISO 3166 code: NG.GO.NA

Nafada is a town and one of the eleven Local Government Areas (LGA) of Gombe State, Nigeria. It is located in the northern part of the state at 11°05′44″N 11°19′58″E, on the Gongola River which traverses the area. According to the 2006 census, the LGA covers 1,586 square kilometres (612 square miles) and has a population of 138,185 people. Nafada has ten wards namely: Nafada East, Nafada Central, Nafada West, Jigawa, Birnin Fulani East, Birnin Bolewa, Birnin Fulani West, Gudukku, Barwo/Nasarawo and Barwo Winde.

== Geography ==
Nafada Local Government Area encompasses a cumulative area of 1,586 square kilometres (612 square miles) and it has an average temperature of 33 °C.

The Gongola River flows through the LGA and the area has an average humidity level of 20 percent The Nafada river originated from the River Gongola rises on the Eastern slopes of the Jos Plateau and falls to the Gongola basin running north-easterly until Nafada and then continued in the same direction to Lake Chad. Presently, it turns south and the south-east until it joins the Hawal River. The river then runs south to the River Benue, joining it opposite the town of Numan. The upper course of the river as well as most of its tributaries are seasonal streams that rapidly fill up in August and September yearly. The lower reaches of the river are impounded by the Dadin Kowa Dam near Gombe and the Kiri Dam further below. Kiri Dam is located at Shelleng LGA of Adamawa state in the north-east of Nigeria which was built to provide irrigation for the Savannah Sugar Company.

=== Climate ===
Nafada, the dry season is scorching and partly cloudy, while the wet season is oppressively hot and cloudy. The average annual temperature ranges from 16 to 40 degrees Celsius (60 to 105 degrees Fahrenheit), rarely falling below 13 °C (55 °F) or rising over 43 °C (109 °F).

==== Temperature ====
From March to May is the hot season, which lasts for 2.4 months and has an average daily high temperature of over 101 °F. In Nafada, April is the hottest month of the year, with an average high of 104 °F and low of 77 °F.

A daily high temperature below 90 °F is typical during the 2.7-month cool season, which runs from July to October. January, with average lows of 61 °F and highs of 93 °F, is the coldest month of the year in Nafada.

==== Precipitation ====
Nafada's total precipitation has significantly increased due to climate change, resulting in a wetter climate in the area.

== History ==
Nafada is located in the traditional land of the Bole people. It was the capital of the Gombe Emirate from 1913 to 1919. The Gombe Emirate was moved to Doma which was later renamed to Gombe.

Nafada is one of the eleven Local Government Areas of Gombe State, Nigeria. It has its administrative headquarter at the town of Nafada and it falls under Gombe North senatorial districts, therefore constituting a federal constituency with Dukku LGA.

== Government ==
Since 2020, the local government chairman and deputy chairman are Musa Abubakar and Salisu Shuaibu Dandele respectively. The chairman Musa Abubakar died on 15 August 2022 on road accident.

The postal code of Nafada is 762.

Nafada LGA belongs to Gombe North Senatorial Zone/District along with Dukku, Funakaye, Kwami and Gombe LGA.

In 2023, Abdullahi El-Rasheed (Bala kelly) (Magatakardan Dukku) became member house of representative representing Nafada and Dukku and His excellency, former Governor of Gombe state Senator Ibrahim Hassan Dankwanbo (Talban Gombe) representing Gombe North senatorial district.

Nafada LGA belongs to Nafada/Dukku federal constituency that comprises the entire geographical areas of:

1. Nafada Local Government Area
2. Dukku Local Government Area

Federal Constituencies in Nigeria are typically made up of a group of Local Government Areas in a particular state and are represented by a member in the Federal House of Representatives.

== Emirs ==
The current Emir of Nafada is HRH Alhaji Muhammad Dadum Hamza

== Wards ==
Wards in Nafada Local Government Area.

- Barwo/Nasarawo
- Barwo Winde
- Birin Bolewa
- Birin Fulani East
- Birin Fulani West
- Gudukku
- Jigawa
- Nafada Central
- Nafada East
- Nafada West

== Localities ==
Towns and villages in Nafada Local Government Area.

- Borwo
- Biri
- Danya
- Diga
- Doho
- Dondole Lewe
- Gadi
- wuro jabi
- Gadari
- Garin Bulomo
- Gube
- Jigawa
- Jolle
- Kiyayo
- Kuka
- Lafiyawo
- Langa
- Mada
- Maru
- Papa
- Shole
- Shonganawo
- Suka
- Tondi
- Wokaldu
- Zangoma Kyari
- Zindir

== Economy of Nafada ==
The Nafada LGA is home to several marketplaces, including the Donfa market, where a wide range of goods are bought and sold. In Nafada LGA, there are also a lot of mineral resources, such as limestone and gypsum. Farming, ceramics, handicrafts, the raising and sale of domestic animals, and some other significant economic activities in Nafada LGA. Nafada has heavy deposit of gypsum as one of its biggest mineral resources. The Fika Shale in Nafada area is composed of thick laminated non-gypsiferous red clay, gypsum-rich blue-black shale and mudstone, grey coloured highly fissile shale and sandy clay with occasional cobbles and pebbles. This great resource is however under utilized, a sad reality that makes the local Government one amongst those with least infrastructure.

== Notable people ==
- HRH Aljahi Muhammadu Dadum Hamza
- Usman Bayero Nafada
- Zainab Adamu Bulkachuwa
- Salisu Shu’aibu Dendele
- Salihu Baba Alkali
- Sheikh Adamu Muhammad Nafada (Sheikh Adamu Misra)
