= Gombe State Agency For Community and Social Development =

Gombe State Agency For Community and Social Development is a community-driven development approach initiative of the Federal Government of Nigeria in collaboration with the World Bank. Gombe State is one of the states wherein the project is implemented.

== Background ==
The Community and Social Development Project came into existence as a result of the experiences drawn from such as Local Empowerment (LEEMP) and Environmental Management Project and Community Based Poverty Reduction Project (CPRP).

The Community and Social Development Project is an intervention that seeks to build on LEEMP and CPRP structure to effectively target social and environmental infrastructure in the community, and improve Local Government Area responsibility to service delivery. This in turn will improve access to services for Human Development.

The Community-based Poverty Reduction Project(CPRP) started in 2001 with an end date of August 2006. Due to successes recorded the project was supplemented with a $25 Million with an extension to the end date to 2008.

The efficiency of the project was due to the localisation of projects in 12 participating States which had an autonomous agency, private sector participation in the oversight functions as members of the board, and protection from political interference as the project was largely autonomous from the state government.

The 2005 - 2007 Country Partnership Strategy led to the Federal Government and the World Bank agreeing to harmonize Community Driven Development projects in the country to improve and build on the successes recorded. The LEEMP and CPRP were merged as the Social Community Driven Development while the National Fadama Development Project (Fadama 2 & 3) became Economic Community-Driven Development.

== Community development fund ==
In November 2023 there is a Released of fund from that state government to perform social developmental projects in the state.
