= Abubakar Buba Atare =

Abubakar Buba Atare II

Mai of Tula Chiefdom
- Reign: 21 December 2009 – present
- Predecessor: Buba Kokiya Atare
- Born: 16 August 1987 (age 38); Bauchi, Bauchi State, Nigeria
- Spouse: Maryam Ahmad Atare
- Issue: Princess Jamila Atare, Prince Abubakar (Ameer)
- Royal House: Wumne
- Father: Buba Kokiya Atare
- Mother: Mrs Lami Buba MFR
- Religion: Islam

Dr Abubakar Buba Atare II (born Kokiya Abubakar Buba Atare 16 August 1987) is the second Mai or King of Tula Chiefdom. He was crowned on 21 December 2009 after the death of his father Buba K. Atare on 13 December 2009. Mai Abubakar was at the time of his appointment an engineering undergraduate student of Middlesex University, Dubai, United Arab Emirates.

He also holds the position of secretary of the Gombe State Council of Emirs & Chiefs.

In 2017, the Mai donated a parcel of land for the construction of a golf course in Tula. He made the announcement during the opening ceremony of the maiden edition of Gombe Talba Open (GT Open) golf tournament at the Gongila Valley Golf Court, Ashaka Cement Factory in Gombe State.

In November 2017, the Mai attended the funeral rites of Daktibe Jalingo and his son who were murdered by gunmen. In his speech, he condemned the attack and tasked the authorities to apprehend the culprits in order to face full wrath of the law.

In 2018, during the annual Tula cultural day, he called on the people of Tula and the entire Southern Gombe Tangale Waja to be more united, an occasion that was graced by the Executive Governor of Gombe State, Ibrahim Hassan Dankwambo, and the Emir of Misau, HRH Ahmed Sulaiman.

== Educational background ==
His Royal Highness attended Abubakar Tafawa Balewa University staff school Bauchi for his primary education, then proceeded to federal Government college Kwali in Abuja and subsequently federal government college Billiri in Gombe State for his secondary education.

He was admitted into University of Abuja to study Geography which he later left to enrolled in Middlesex University London (Dubai Campus) where he graduated with BSc Honors in software engineering with IT & BIS.

== Work ==
- Network Station Manager at CISCO Systems, Dubai Internet City, UAE before his appointment as the "Mai" or King of Tula Chiefdom.
