= North-Eastern University, Gombe =

University in Gombe, Nigeria

Coordinates: 10.288°N 11.054°E

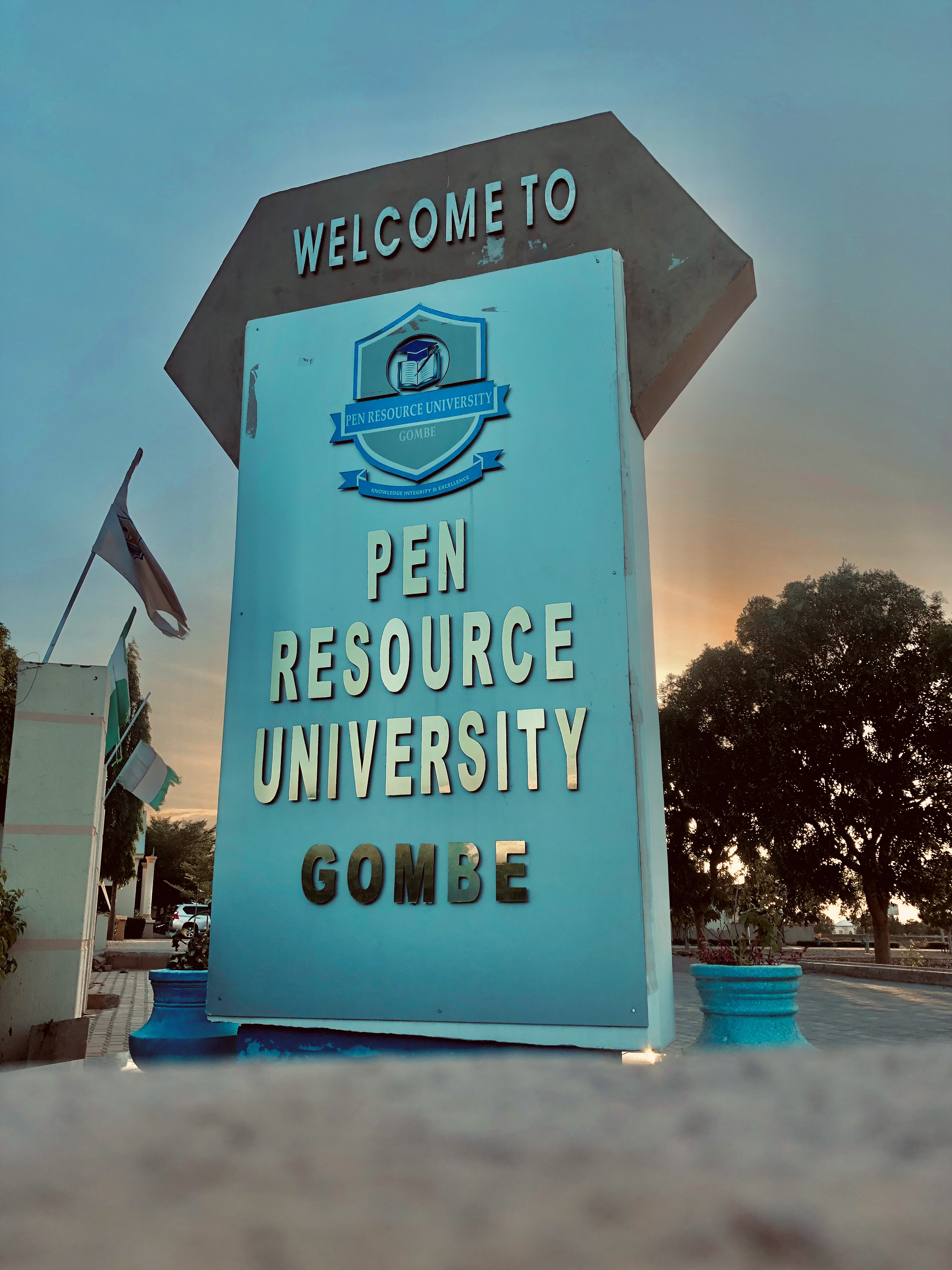
- Motto: Knowledge, Integrity and Excellence
- Type: Private
- Established: 2022
- Founder: Sani Jauro
- Accreditation: National Universities Commission
- Chancellor: Sani Jauro
- Vice-Chancellor: Prof. Yahaya Amuda Yusuph
- Location: Gombe, Gombe, State, Nigeria
- Website: https://pru.edu.ng/
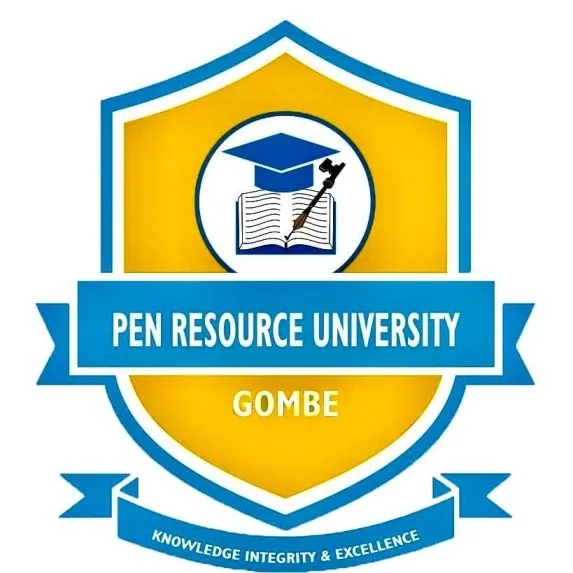

North-Eastern University, Gombe (formerly known as Pen Resource University), established by proprietor of Pen Resource Academy (PRA), is a private, co-educational group of schools in Gombe, Gombe State, in north-eastern Nigeria. It is among twelve private universities approved to be established by the Federal Executive Council (FEC) on April 6, 2022. It became licensed by the Nigeria .Universities Commission (NUC) in May 2022.

== History ==
Pen Resource University is the first private university in Gombe State and the third in north-eastern Nigeria. It was established by Dr. Sani Jauro as Pen Resource Academy. The school is situated in the village of Lafiyawo along Gombe-Bauchi road, Gombe, Gombe State, and focuses on educating students in digital and other twenty-first century-relevant skills.

== Pro Chancellor ==
Dr. Sani Jauro is the Pro-Chancellor and Chairman of the Governing Council of Pen Resource University.

== Vice Chancellor ==
Professor Yahaya Amuda Yusuph, a Professor of Mathematics, is the current Vice Chancellor of the university.

== Faculties and Departments ==
The university has four faculties:

- Faculty of Science and Computing;
- Faculty of Law;
- Faculty of Communications, Management and Social Sciences. and
- Faculty of Allied Health Sciences.

== Faculty of Science and Computing ==
The Faculty of Science and Computing at Pen Resource University is one of the prominent academic divisions within the institution. It offers a diverse range of programs and research opportunities in various scientific disciplines.

- Department of Urban & Regional Planning: The Department of Urban & Regional Planning at Pen Resource University offers a specialized undergraduate program:
1. B.Sc. Urban & Regional Planning: urban design, land use planning, transportation, and environmental sustainability.

== Faculty of Law ==
With two specialized departments, the faculty provides legal training that encompasses various legal systems and principles.

- Department of Islamic Law: Under this department, students can pursue the LL.B (Common & Islamic Law) program. The curriculum encompasses both Common Law and Sharia Law, providing students with a deep understanding of Islamic legal principles alongside the broader aspects of common law systems.
- Department of Public and Private Law: This department offers the LL.B(Common Law) program, focusing on core areas of public and private law. Students engage with fundamental legal concepts, legal systems, and the complexities of governing both public institutions and private interactions.

== Faculty of Communications, Management & Social Sciences ==
The Faculty of Communications, Management & Social Sciences comprises five departments, offering the following programs:

1. Department of Accounting & Finance:
  - BSc. Accounting: financial reporting, auditing, taxation, and managerial accounting.
  - BSc. Procurement Management: Focuses on procurement strategies, contract management, and supply chain optimization for effective business operations.
2. Department of Business Administration:
  - BSc. Business Administration: management principles, marketing, human resources, and organizational behavior.
3. Department of Communications:
  - BSc. Mass Communication: journalism, public relations, advertising, and media production.
4. Department of Economics:
  - BSc. Economics and Development Studies: Examines economic theories, policies, and development strategies to address global socioeconomic challenges.
5. Department of Political Science and Administration:
  - BSc. International Relations: Explores global affairs, diplomacy, and international cooperation in a rapidly changing world.
  - BSc. Political Science: Analyzes political systems, governance, and political theories to understand societal dynamics.
  - BSc. Public Administration: Focuses on public policy, governance, and administrative practices for effective public sector management.

== Faculty of Allied Health Sciences ==
The faculty comprises three specialized departments:

1. Department of Nursing Science:
  - BNSc. Nursing Science: Offers a comprehensive program to train skilled nurses, equipped with essential medical knowledge and compassionate care.
2. Department of Medical Laboratory Sciences:
  - BMLS Medical Laboratory Science: Prepares students for vital roles in medical diagnostics and research, utilizing cutting-edge laboratory technologies.
3. Department of Public Health:
  - BSc. Public Health: Focuses on promoting community health, disease prevention, and health policy for better population well-being.

== Library ==
The Pen Resource University Library was established concurrently with the university in 2021.

== Accreditation ==
The degrees conferred by the university hold accreditation from the Nigerian Universities Commission (NUC).
