= Bajoga Northeast Airport =

- IATA: none; ICAO: none; LID: DN54

Summary
- Airport type: Public
- Serves: Bajoga
- Elevation AMSL: 1,000 ft (300 m)
- Coordinates: 10°55′10″N 11°30′00″E

Map
- Location of the airport in Nigeria

Runways
Direction	Length		Surface
Direction	m	ft	Surface
05/23	1,500	4,921	Asphalt
- Source: GCM Google Maps

Bajoga Northeast Airport (FAA LID: DN54) is an airport serving Bajoga and the Ashaka Cement Plant in Nigeria. It is 10 kilometres (6 mi) northeast of Bajoga, and connected by a direct road to the cement plant.

Runway length does not include a 300-metre (980 ft) displaced threshold on Runway 23.

== See also ==
- Transport in Nigeria
- List of airports in Nigeria
