= Kwami =

- LGA
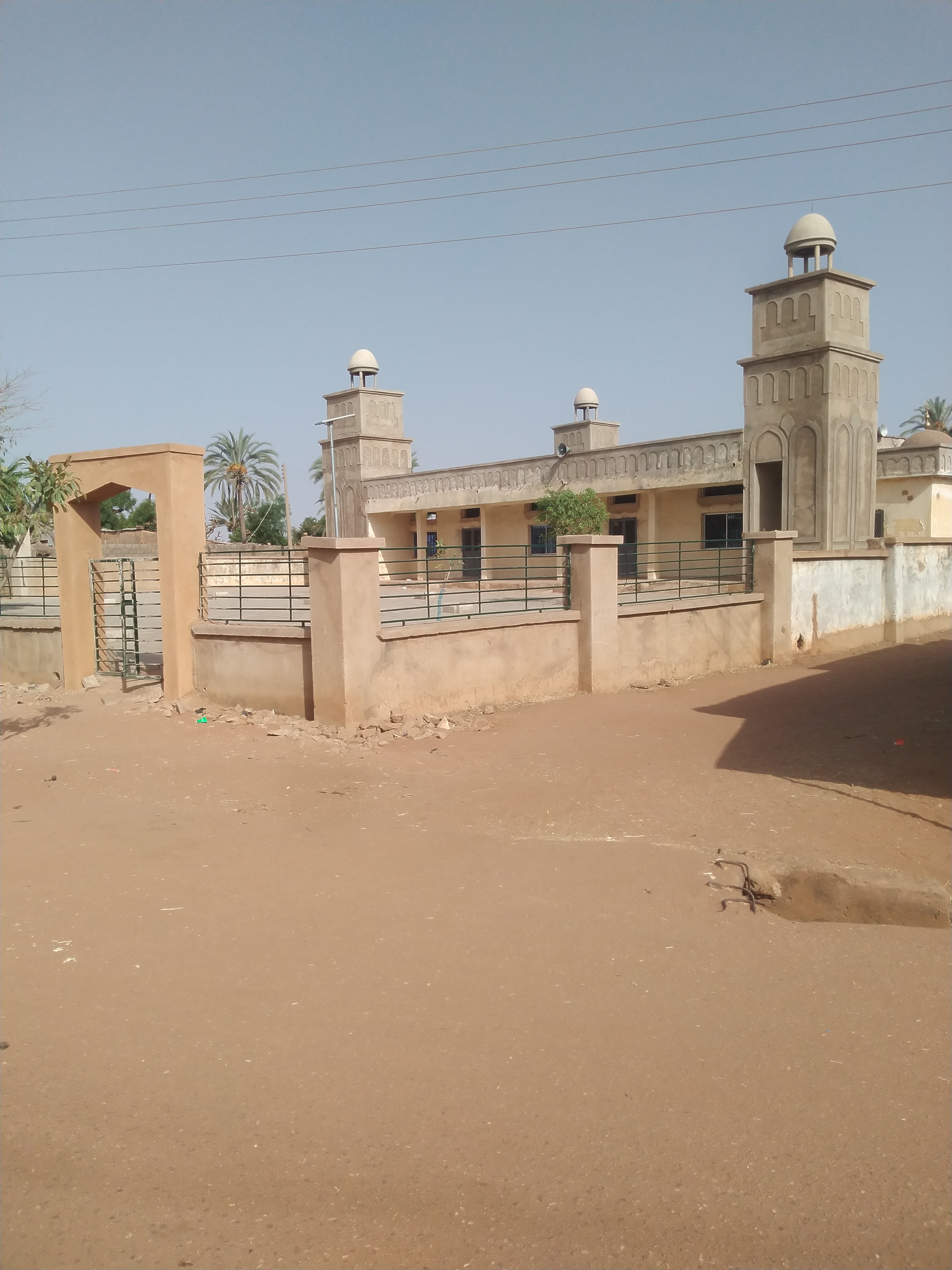
- Interactive map of Kwami
- Location in Nigeria
- Coordinates: 10°30′N 11°15′E
- Country: Nigeria
- State: Gombe State
- Headquarters: Malam Sidi

Government
  - Local Government Chairman and the Head of the Local Government Council: Ahmad Wali Doho

Area
  - Total: 1,787 km^{2} (690 sq mi)
- Elevation: 481 m (1,578 ft)

Population (2006 census)
  - Total: 195,298
  - Density: 109.3/km^{2} (283.1/sq mi)
- Time zone: UTC+1 (WAT)
- 3-digit postal code prefix: 760
- ISO 3166 code: NG.GO.KW

Kwami is a Local Government Area of Gombe State, Nigeria. It has its headquarters in the town of Mallam Sidi. Kwami is bordered in the east by Lake Dadin Kowa, in the north by Funakaye and Gombe in the south. The postal code of the area is 760.

== Population ==
The population of Kwami in 2006 census is 195,298.

== Religion ==
The people of kwami local government area are mostly and majority Muslims with Christians minority.

== Geographical location ==
Kwami LGA has a total area of 1,787 square kilometres or 690 square miles and lies on the banks of Lake Dadinkowa. The area witnesses two major seasons which are the dry and the rainy seasons. The average temperature in Kwami LGA is 32 °C.

=== Climate ===
The dry and wet seasons are the two most prevalent ones in the region.

== Economy of Kwami ==
The dwellers of Kwami are into many different economical activities but the most common one is farming and fishing.

=== Farming ===
Kwami LGA residents engage in farming, trade, and domestic animal rearing, cultivating crops like beans and millet, and hosting markets for various commodities and domestic animals.

== Infrastructure ==
In December 2022, Gombe State Governor Muhammad Inuwa Yahaya reiterated the state government's plan to begin construction of the road connecting Kwami and Malam-Sidi, the LGA's headquarters, to reduce administrative challenges and bring economic and social prosperity to the people of the LGA.

== Headquarter ==
Malam Sidi is the administrative headquarter of Kwami LGA.

== Education ==
Secondary Schools in Kwami include:

1. Government Day Secondary School, Bojude
2. Government Day Secondary School, Gadam
3. Government Comprehensive Day Secondary School, Kwami
4. Government Day Comprehensive Secondary School Gadam
5. Government Technical Secondary School Kwami
6. Government Day Junior secondary school Kwami
7. Community Day Secondary School Doho

== Localities ==
Town and villages in Kwami Local Government Area.

- Doho
- Bojude
- Dukul
- Gadam
- Jurara
- Komfulata
- Malleri
- Kwami
- Daban Fulani
- Malam Sidi
