= Tula Chiefdom =

Traditional state in northern Nigeria

The Tula Kingdom is a Nigerian traditional state in northern Nigeria with its headquarters in Wange, Kaltungo Local Government Area, Gombe. It comprises three districts: Yiri, Baule and Wange, and is located 101 kilometres (63 mi) away from the Gombe State capital and 15 kilometres (9.3 mi) off the Adamawa-Yola highway. The Present Mai or King Dr Abubakar Buba Atare II is the paramount ruler and chairman of Tula Chiefdom.

== Tula people ==
The Tula people are known for being great warriors, as evidenced by the saying "Tula Maza Ba Tsoro," which indicates that Tula engaged in a Battle with the people of Misau Emirate present-day Bauchi State, a Jihad led by the 'Emir' of Misau, Mai Sale, who was not only defeated but also killed during the battle. His remains were buried at Sukube Baule in 1887 during the reign of Mai Baule Wumne.

The Tula people were the only people of Ngazargamu / Bornu Empire descent who fought a commander of the Sokoto Caliphate and defeated the caliphate's army. The Tula people were never defeated on a battleground. Tula was among the few settlements that resisted incorporation by the forces of Usman dan Fodio during the jihad that led to the establishment of the Sokoto Caliphate.

== History ==
The disunity among the three districts that comprise the Tula Chiefdom delayed its creation until 2001. It was created out of the Kaltungo Chiefdom under the administration of Abubakar Habu Hashidu, the then Governor of Gombe State, by an act of the Gombe State House of Assembly.

Dr Kokiya Atare Buba was appointed the 'Mai', or King of the newly created chiefdom, which consists of 13 districts, and the new emir was presented with his staff of office in March 2003 at Kaltin, where his tomb resides. Dr K A Buba took the regnal name Dr K A Buba (The 1st Mai of Tula).

On 13 December 2009, Dr K A Buba died, leaving the stool vacant; 8 days later, his 22-year-old son, Abubakar Buba Atare, was appointed to succeed him, making him the Youngest Monarch in recent memory. He took the regnal name Aubakar Buba Atare II (The Second Mai of Tula).

In January 2011, the then Executive Governor of Gombe State, Mohammed Danjuma Goje, upgraded the Tula Chiefdom to a first-class status. In May 2017, Mai Abubakar Atare donated land so a golf course could be built in the Tula region.

=== Tula battlefield ===
The battlefield is located in Tula at the Kaltungo Local Government in Gombe State. This is a historical site for the Gombe people because this is the ground where the British attacked and conquered the people of Tula under the command of Captain Calyle.

The attack on the Tula people by the Colonialists was caused by their rejection of peaceful coexistence among the surrounding ethnic groups. By 1908, the other ethnic groups had reported the Tula to the then Colonial Resident Officer in Bauchi, stating that they were terrorizing them. This prompted the colonial masters to intervene in the situation, and they attempted to settle the matter to bring peace among the surrounding communities. However, the Tulas rejected any peaceful reconciliation offered by the colonial masters.

The Tula people were confident about their abilities to fight because no ethnic group around them had ever conquered them. They were so confident that they also stole the gun of the colonial master who came for the peace talks and rejected every peace offer. This made the colonial masters angry, so a war was waged on the people of Tula, which Captain Calye led. The people of Tula thought fighting with the Colonists was like every other war they had fought and won, but this war brought about the conquest of the Tula chiefdom, which was now relegated to answer to the Kaltungo chiefdom, which used to be a chiefdom in Tangale/Waja.

== Tourist centres in Tula ==
The Tula Cave

== Rulers ==
- Dr K Atare Buba (2001 - 2009)
- Abubakar Buba Atare (2009 - present)

== Title holders ==
Some other positions include:
| Name | Position |
|---|---|
| Ibrahim Hassan Musa | District Head of Baule |
| Abdullahi Aska Shamaki | District Head of Wange |
| Mal. Abdulrahman Barkindo | Sarkin Hurumin Tula |
| Mr Elias Nathan Yatufate | Sarkin Yamman Tula |
| Mal. Munnir Hassan Dankwambo | Jagaban Tula |
| Mal. Naseer Mohammad Shuaib | Ciroman Labaru of Tula |
| Yerima Doma | District Head of Yiri |
| R B Lamay | Jakadan Tula |
| Alhaji Yahaya W Yahya | Galadiman Tula |
| Ibrahim Hassan | Ciroman Tula |
