= GOGIS =

Government agency in government

Gombe Geographic and Information System
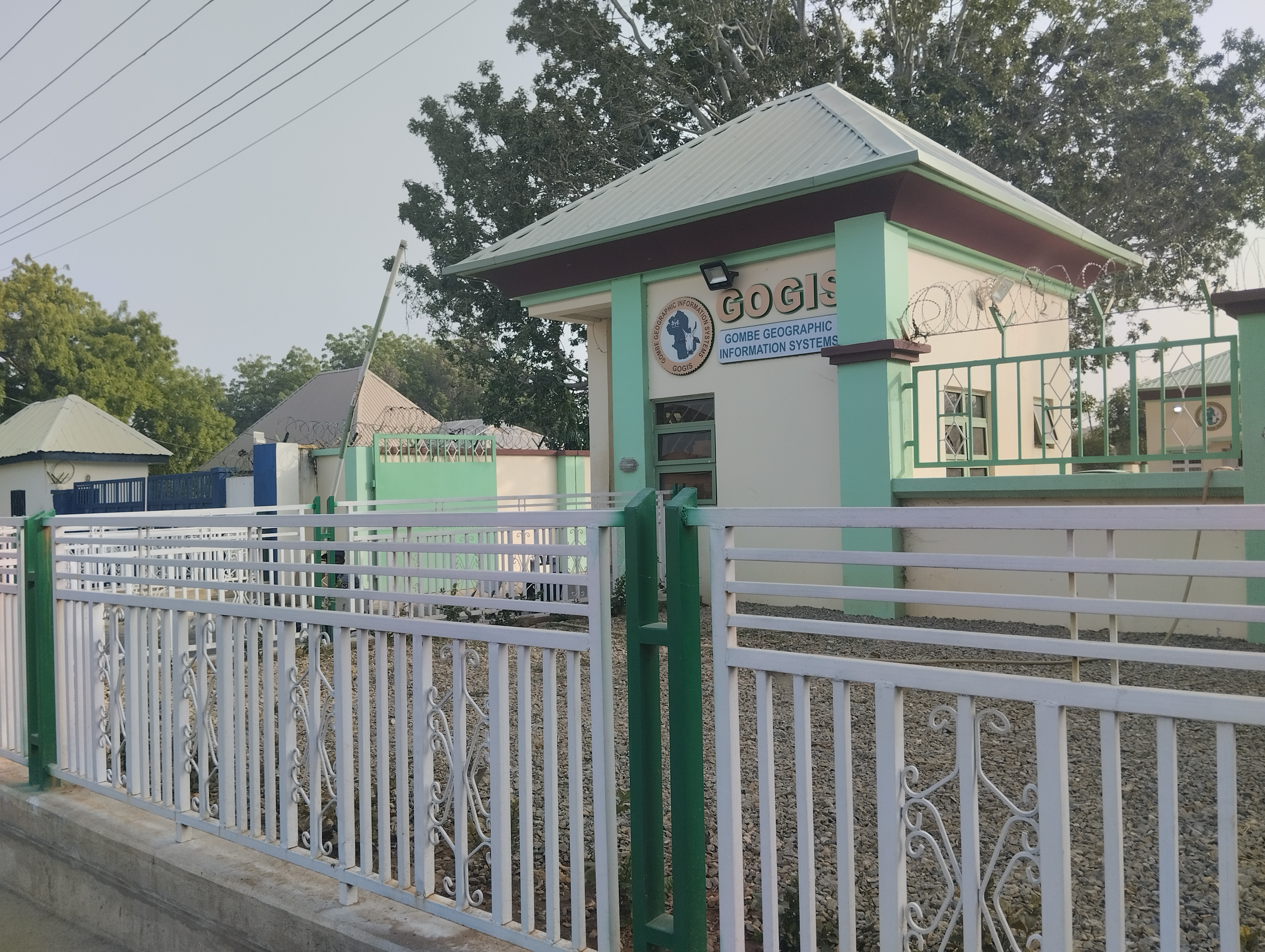

Agency overview
- Jurisdiction: Gombe State
- Headquarters: Gombe, Gombe State
- Agency executive: Dr. Kabiru Usman Hassan, Director General

Gombe State Geographic Information System (GOGIS) is a digitalised land administrative system that carried out the process of determining, recording, disseminating information about land acquisition, ownership, its value and land management policies in Gombe State, Nigeria.

== History ==
GOGIS was established by Gombe State Government to put an end to land conflicts that is mostly caused by land transactions done by unauthorised brokers which often disrupt the peace and economic stability of the State.

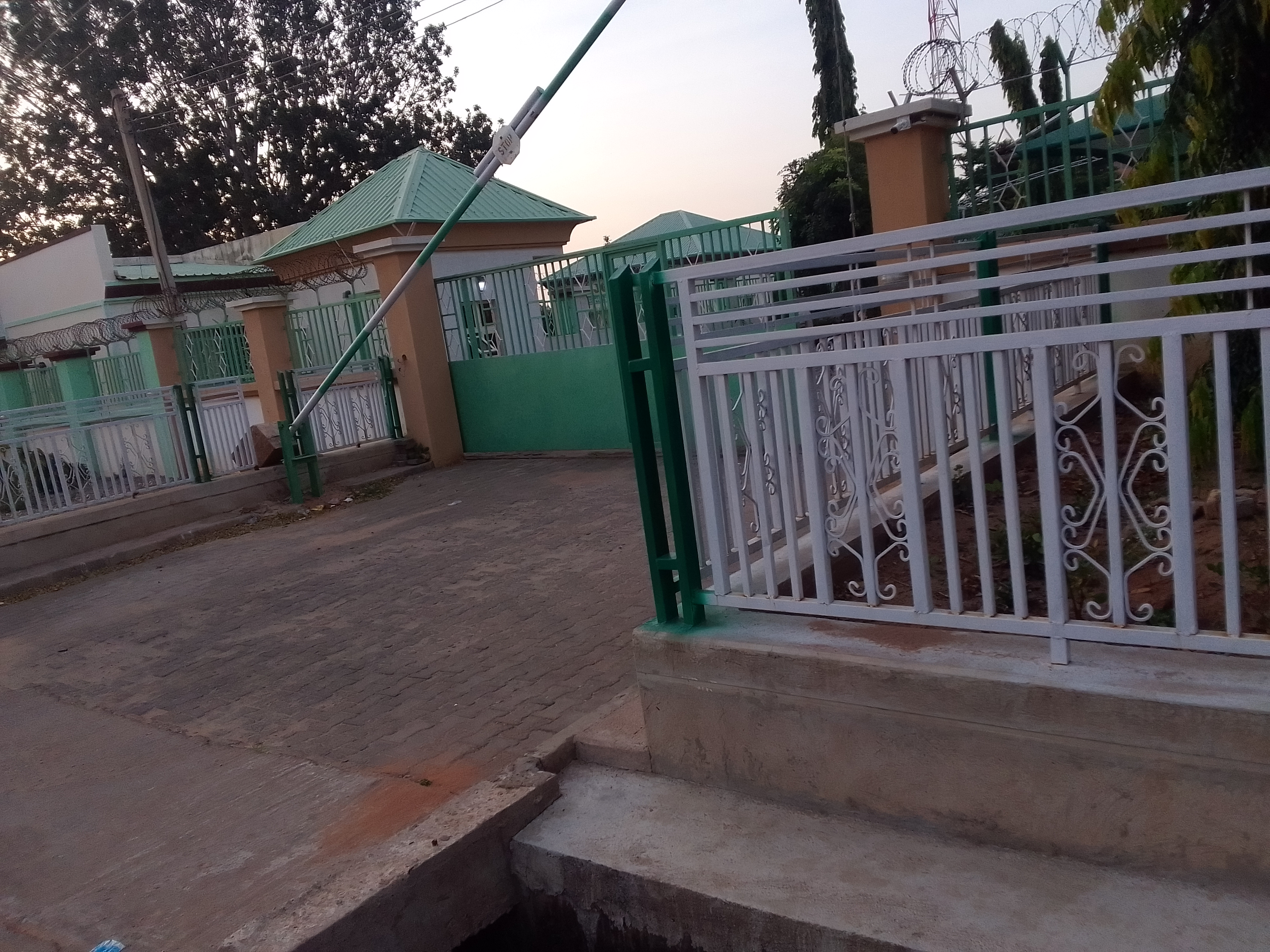
GOGIS,_Gombe_State

Inuwa Yahaya, the Governor of the state remarked on the establishment that

it is an established fact that a just and efficient land administration system is necessary in order to guarantee ownership and security of tenure, provision of security, support land and property taxation, monitor land transactions as well as reduced incessant disputes associated with land.

== Administration ==
=== The Director General ===
GOGIS is headed by a director general. The current director general, Dr. Kabiru Usman Hassan, was appointed in 2020 by the governor of Gombe State. Dr. Hassan was also reappointed to continue spearheading the mandate of the agency on 14 July 2023.

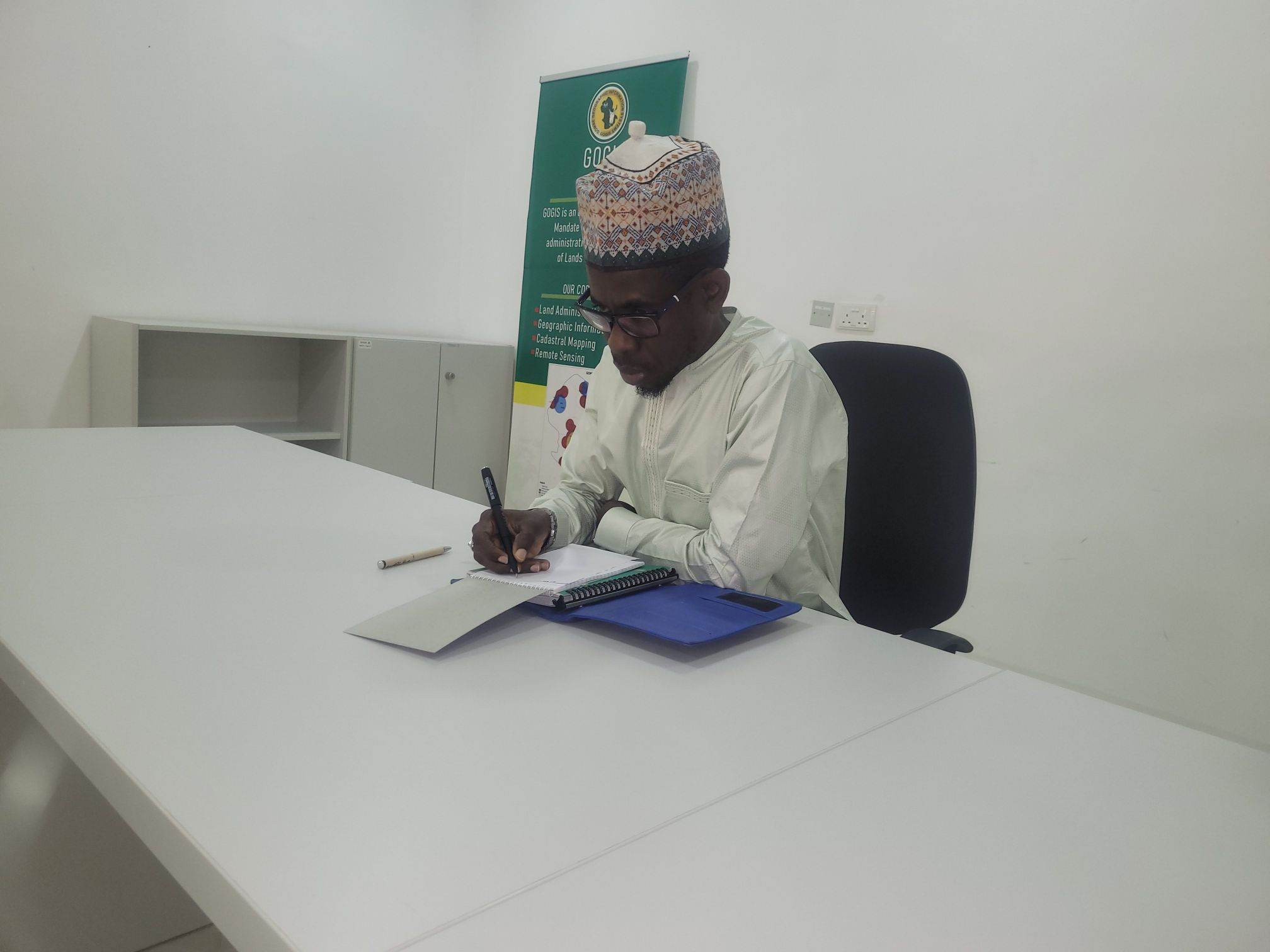
