= Dadin Kowa Dam =

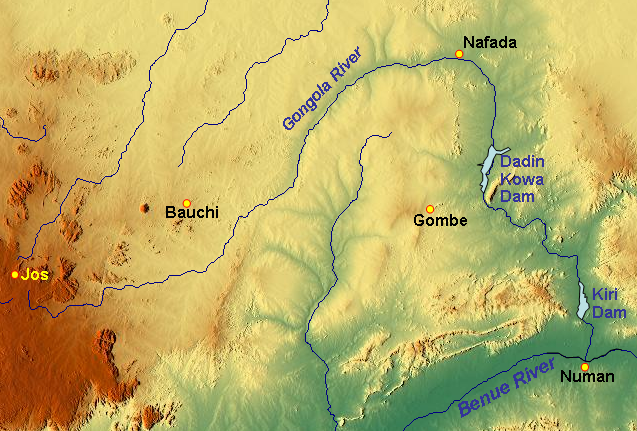
- Gongola River
- Interactive map of Dadin Kowa Dam
- Location: Gombe State, Nigeria
- Coordinates: 10°19′19″N 11°28′54″E
- Opening date: 1984

Dam and spillways
- Impounds: Gongola River

Reservoir
- Creates: Lake Dadin Kowa
- Total capacity: 800,000,000 m^{3} (0.19 mi^{3})
- Surface area: 300 km^{2} (120 mi^{2})

The Dadin Kowa Dam is located in Yamaltu Deba local government area of Gombe State in the North east part of Nigeria. Dadin Kowa is 41.6 kilometres (25.8 mi) from Gombe metropolis. The dam is located about 37 km (23 mi) to the east of the town Gombe and 5 km from the Dadin Kowa village, and provides drinking water for the town. The dam was completed by the federal government in 1984, with the goal of providing irrigation and electricity for the planned Gongola sugar plantation project.

== Description ==
The reservoir which is designed to have a water capacity of 2.8 billion cubic metres making it the 2nd largest dam in the country and a surface area of 300 square kilometres (120 sq mi), and has potential as a source of fishing. 26,000 people were displaced by the reservoir, receiving little assistance for resettlement. The reservoir is suspected to be a major breeding site for black flies, which cause river blindness.

The water supply project was built at a cost of about N8.2billion by CGC Nigeria, a Chinese company, completed during the administration of Governor Mohammed Danjuma Goje. In 2010 it was providing about 30,000 cubic metres daily, treated at a plant three kilometers from the dam before being piped to storage reservoirs in Gombe while supplying communities along the road.

In August 2001, the federal government announced that it would spend $32 million to complete the Dadin Kowa Dam power generation facilities. In March 2009 N7 billion was allocated to complete the hydro-electrical generation component of the dam, and another N500 million to complete the canal, which would irrigate 6,600 ha (25 sq mi; 16,000 acres) of farmland. In August 2009 Governor Goje said that less than N600 million was needed to provide the canals.

After prioritization by the government for completion of the project in 2016, the ministry concluded completion of the dam in August 2021. As of September 2021, the Ministry of Power hadn't enabled full use of energy from the dam as part of the grid.

== Appearance of hippopotamus ==
Around 2015, a hippopotamus appeared in Dadin Kowa and became a threat to the community where it destroyed their farm produce and stopped them from going to their farms. According to one wildlife officer, he said the hippo came from Kiri Dam. He also said the hippo passed through Shani Local Government through some parts of Nafada and Funakaye Local Government Areas, the hippo was killed by the soldiers with the help of local hunters.

== Dadin Kowa Hydropower project ==
The federal government has commissioned a 40 megawatt Dadin Kowa Hydropower Project in Gombe State MABON GROUP, a company had secured and was awarded 25 year build -operate-transfer concession in respect to the Dadin Kowa Hydropower plant project in Nigeria. Mabon has completed the hydropower plant project and has been operational and contributing power to the national grid since.

== Climate ==
Dadin Kowa, which is 0 feet/metres above sea level, has a tropical wet and dry or savanna climate (Classification: Aw). The district averages a yearly temperature of 31.55 °C (88.79 °F), which is 2.09% higher than the national average for Nigeria. 69.05 millimetres (2.72 inches) of precipitation and 99.44 rainy days (27.24 percent of the time) are typical yearly totals for Dadin Kowa.
