= Jaaruma =

Nigerian sex therapist

Hauwa Saidu Mohammed
- Other names: Jaaruma, Jaruma
- Education: Istanbul Kultur University
- Occupations: Entrepreneur, escort, sex therapist
- Years active: 2010
- Known for: kayan mata and the founder of goron jaruma
- Notable work: participated in different charities around Nigeria

Children: 1 (Sultan Isabor) Hauwa Saidu Mohammed (born 26 October 1993) known as Jaruma is a Nigerian self-proclaimed sex therapist, entrepreneur and founder of Jaaruma Empire Limited.

== Early life and education ==
Jaruma is from Billiri local government area of Gombe State. She attended New Capital Nursery and Primary School in Asokoro, Abuja and Nigerian Turkish International College, Abuja. In 2004, she was admitted into Ahmadu Bello University, Zaria but left before the end of her program to study International Relations and Human Therapy in Istanbul Kultur University, Turkey.

== Enterprise background ==
From 2010 to 2016, Jaruma ventured into several businesses from selling pots hair, dresses, to real estate. She started a YouTube channel in 2016 to promote the therapeutic benefits of Azanza Garckeana also known as Snot Apple, Mutohwe, African chewing gum, gorontula, tula kola nut or morojwa. The channel's increasing audience formed the market for her product line when they were released in 2017. She is rumoured to be the owner of popular Instagram blog, instablog9ja.

== Advocacy ==
Jaruma advocates for women's early test for vaginal infection and cervical cancer. Coming from Northern Nigeria where discussing sex is seen as a taboo, she tries to change the perception people have about women from the North and how they see themselves sexually.

== Personal life ==
She was married to Ross Isabor (2018-2021). In 2022, Ross Isabor posted on his Instagram page that he has divorced Jaruma a long time ago and warned her to desist from using his name to sell fake products.

== See also ==
- Lori Brotto
- Laura Berman
