= Gombe State Urban Planning and Development Authority =

State government agency in Nigeria

Gombe State Urban Planning and Development Authority (GOSUPDA) is a Gombe State government agency established to facilitate and enforce planning regulations for the development of the State. GOSUPDA issues and regulates building approval to individuals or organizations that wish to develop their land.

== Functions of GOSUPDA ==
i. Development control
ii. Conflict resolution among developers
iii. Approval of building plans
iv. Custodian of both Federal and State Right of Way (R-o-W)
v. City Beautification
vi. Street Naming and House Numbering
vii. Maintenance of parks and garden
viii. Approval for erection of signage, billboards and signboards
ix. Issuance of Certificate of completion to developers
x. Preparation and design of master plans
xi. Formulation of state policies for Urban and Regional Planning
xii. Conduct Research in Urban and Regional Planning
xiii. Provision of Technical Assistance
xiv. Consultation and coordination to the Federal, State and Local Government in the preparation of physical plans
xv. Preparation and submission of annual progress reports on the operations of the national physical plan as it pertains to the state.
xvi. Review of annual report submitted to them.

== Leadership ==
On 14 July 2023, Gombe state governor, Muhammad Inuwa Yahaya approved the appointment of Samanja Bappayo Maudo as executive chairman of the agency.
