= Bajoga =

Town in Gombe, Nigeria

Coordinates: 10°51′16″N 11°25′55″E

Bajoga is a town and headquarters of Funakaye, a local government area located in the northern part of Gombe State, Nigeria. Bajoga is 9 km south of the Ashaka cement factory. The town is served by the Bajoga Northeast Airport.

== Schools ==
- Mus'ab bn Umair Comprehensive Day Secondary School Bajoga
- Government Day Secondary School Bajoga
- Gombe State Polytechnic Bajoga
- JIBWIS Islamic Secondary School Bajoga
- Girl Child Initiative School
- Gandu Primary School Bajoga
- Government Vocational Training Center Bajoga
- Al'majiri School
- Sangaru Primary School, Bajoga
- Government Junior Secondary School Sangaru, Bajoga
- Federal Government Girls College
- Government Day Secondary School Bajoga South

== See also ==
- Railway stations in Nigeria
