= Kiri Dam =

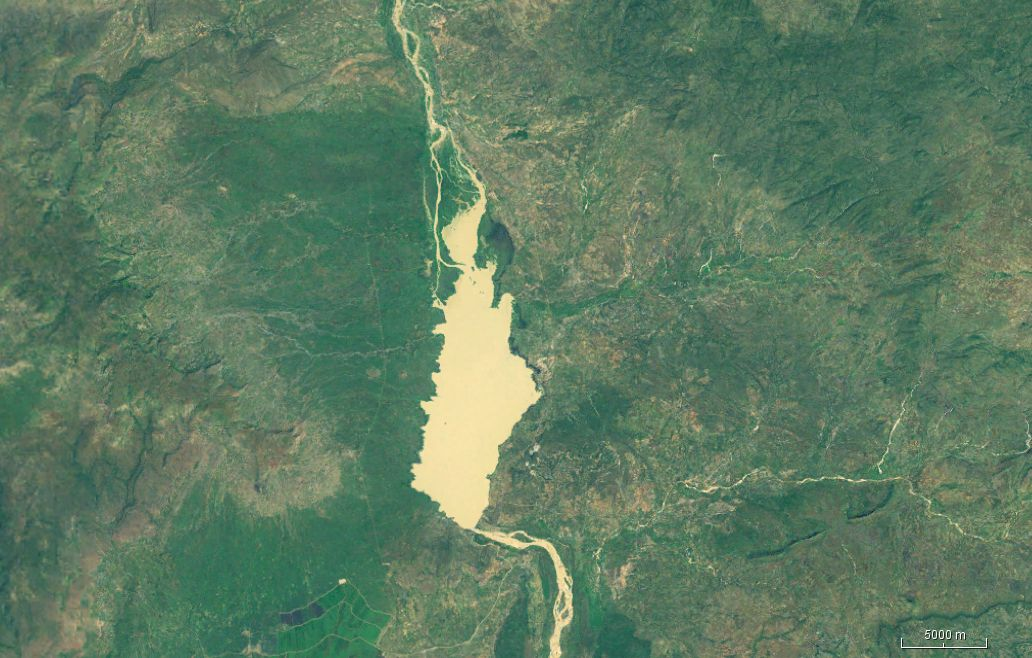
- Satellite photo of Kiri Dam
- Interactive map of Kiri Dam
- Country: Nigeria
- Location: Shelleng, Adamawa State
- Coordinates: 9°40′47″N 12°00′51″E

Dam and spillways
- Type of dam: Earth fill dam
- Impounds: Gongola River
- Height: 20 m (66 ft)
- Length: 72.2 km^{2}

Reservoir
- Creates: Kiri lake
- Total capacity: 615 million m³

The Kiri Dam is in Shelleng local government area of Adamawa State in the north east of Nigeria, damming the Gongola River. It is a 1.2 km long, 20 m high zoned embankment with an internal clay blanket. The dam was mainly completed in 1982. The reservoir has a capacity of 615 million m³.

== Savannah Sugar Company ==
The dam was built to provide irrigation for the Savannah Sugar Company (SSC), a large-scale sugar cane plantation and processing company set up as a joint venture between the Nigerian Federal Government and the Commonwealth Development Corporation (CDC), London. The CDC was managing agent for the project, and the construction contract was awarded to NECCO, a company largely owned by the government.

The Savannah Sugar Company was acquired by Dangote Industries in 2002. In 2009 the company owned 32,000 hectares of land near the dam, of which 6,330 were in use and employed about 5,000 people. The company was producing about 50,000 tons of sugar annually, supplying the Nigerian market, which consumes 1.1 million tons each year. Over 1,000 hectares of irrigated rice and other crops were being grown using the company's canals.

== Flood ==
=== 2015 Flood ===
In 2015, seven different communities were flooded in Adamawa State following the heavy overflow of water from Kiri Dam located in the state. In an attempt to ensure safety for the victims, the Adamawa State Emergency Management Agency under the leadership of Mr. Haruna Furo provided a rescue camp that accommodated the victims. However, there was no recorded death from the massive flood.

== Impact ==
29,000 hectares of land were expropriated without compensation, eventually displacing 20,000 people. Resettlement assistance was inadequate. The dam has affected the lower reaches of the Gongola River. Flood peaks dropped from 1,420 m³/second to 1,256 m³/second, while flows in drier seasons increased from 5.7 m³/second to 21 m³/second. The river downstream from the dam has narrowed and become less winding, with fewer separate channels.

The people living in communities around the dam use it daily. They use it for fishing, bathing, washing and collecting water for general use. The dam also brings about environmental and health issues for those communities. There have been flooding, soil erosion, destruction of farmlands and buildings, dysentery, malaria, typhoid, skin diseases, and cholera.

== Future ==
An assessment of the dam in 2004 rated its condition "good". In October 2008 the United States Trade and Development Agency issued a request for proposals on constructing a 35 MW hydroelectric power plant at the dam.
