= Gongola River =

River in northeastern Nigeria

Coordinates: 9°30′N 12°04′E

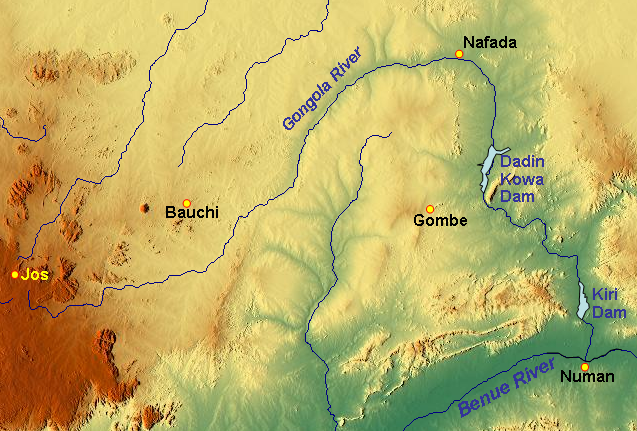
Gongola River

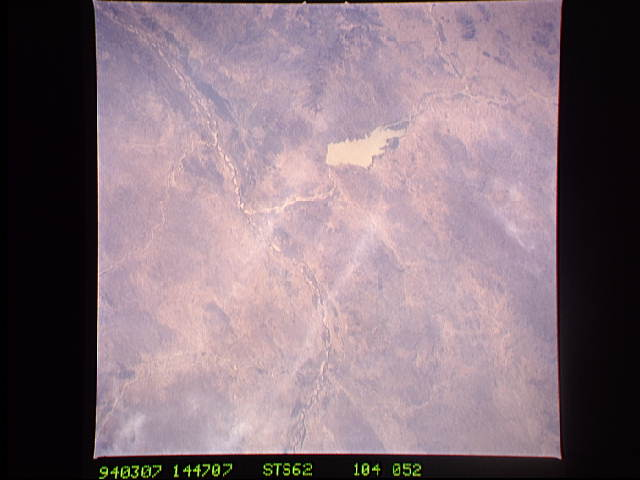

The Gongola River is in northeastern Nigeria, the principal tributary of the Benue River. The upper course of the river as well as most of its tributaries are seasonal streams, but fill rapidly in August and September. The Gongola rises on the eastern slopes of the Jos Plateau and falls to the Gongola Basin, running northeasterly until Nafada. At one time, the Gongola continued from here in the northeast direction to Lake Chad. Today it turns south and then southeast until it joins the Hawal River, its main tributary. The Gongola then runs south to the Benue river, joining it opposite the town of Numan.

The lower reaches of the river are impounded by the Dadin Kowa Dam near Gombe, and farther down by the Kiri Dam. After the Kiri dam was constructed, downstream flood peaks dropped from 1,420 cubic metres per second (50,000 cu ft/s) to 1,256 cubic metres per second (44,400 cu ft/s), while flows in drier seasons increased from 5.7 cubic metres per second (200 cu ft/s) to 21 cubic metres per second (740 cu ft/s). The river downstream from the dam has also narrowed and become less winding, with fewer separate channels.

The Gongola's floodplains are covered with fertile black alluvial soil Cotton, peanuts (groundnuts), and sorghum are grown and sold to other parts of the country. Millet, beans, cassava (manioc), onions, corn (maize), and rice are also cultivated. The government built the Kiri Dam on the river near Numan to provide irrigation for a sugar plantation. The basin is also used as grazing ground for cattle, goats, sheep, horses, and donkeys.

== Pollution ==
The Nigerian National Petroleum Corporation (NNPC), which announced the discovery of crude oil and gas in the Gongola Basin, northern Nigeria, noted that the commercial viability of the discovery from the drilling to a total depth of 13,701 ft before hitting oil and gas in several levels was yet to be ascertained. The environment will suffer. There will be dislocation and relocation of communities, pollution and destruction to farmlands and the aquatic ecosystem.
