= Gombe State =

State of Nigeria

- State
- Flag Seal

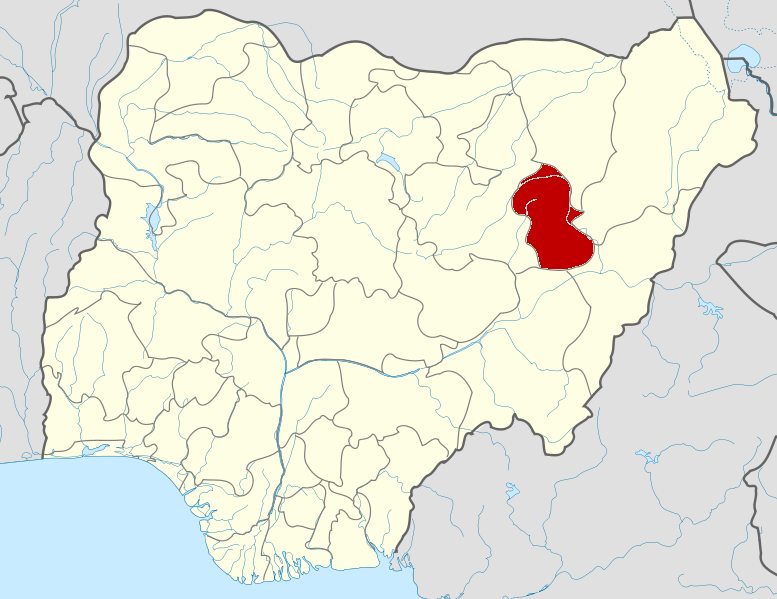
- Location of Gombe State in Nigeria
- Coordinates: 10°16′53″N 11°9′48″E
- Country: Nigeria
- LGAs: 11
- Date created: 1 October 1996
- Capital: Gombe

Government
  - Body: Government of Gombe State
  - Governor: Muhammad Inuwa Yahaya (APC)
  - Deputy Governor: Manasseh Daniel Jatau (APC)
  - Legislature: Gombe State House of Assembly
  - Senators: C: Mohammed Danjuma Goje (APC); N: Ibrahim Hassan Dankwambo (PDP); S: Anthony Yaro (PDP)
  - Representatives: List

Area
  - Total: 18,768 km^{2} (7,246 sq mi)
  - Rank: 22nd of 36

Population (2006 census)^{1}
  - Total: 2,365,040
  - Estimate (2022): 3,960,100
  - Rank: 33rd of 36
  - Density: 126.01/km^{2} (326.38/sq mi)

GDP (PPP)
  - Year: 2021
  - Total: $13.58 billion 27th of 36
  - Per capita: $3,553; 20th of 36
- Time zone: UTC+01 (WAT)
- Postal code: 771100
- ISO 3166 code: NG-GO
- HDI (2022): 0.466 low · 29th of 37
- Website: gombestate.gov.ng

Gombe State (Fula: 𞤤𞤫𞤴𞤣𞤭 𞤺𞤮𞤥𞥆𞤦𞤫 Lesdi Gommbe; Tangale: Kwambe) is a state in northeastern Nigeria, bordered to the north and northeast by the states of Borno in the vicinity of Gongola River and Lake Dadin Kowa and Yobe in the vicinity of Gongola River, to the south by Taraba State, to the southeast by Adamawa State, and to the west by Bauchi State. Gombe is the state capital of Gombe state and it was formed from a part of Bauchi State on 1 October 1996. Of the 36 states in Nigeria, Gombe is the 22nd largest in area and the 32nd most populous, with an estimated population of about 3.25 million as of 2016. The state bears a slogan "Jewel in the Savannah".

Geographically, the state is within the tropical West Sudanian savanna ecoregion. Important geographic features include the Gongola River — which flows through Gombe's north and east into Lake Dadin Kowa — and part of the Muri Mountains, a small range in the state's far south. Among the state's nature endowments are a number of snake species, including carpet viper, puff adder, and Egyptian cobra populations along with hippopotamus, Senegal parrot, and grey-headed kingfisher populations.

The state is inhabited by various ethnic groups, primarily the Fulani people living in the north and center of the state, and the Tangale, living in the Southern and Central part of the state, while the state's diverse eastern and southern regions are populated by the Cham, Dadiya, Jara, Kamo, Pero, Tangale, Tera, Lunguda and Waja peoples. Religiously, between 65% and 70% of the state's populations are Muslim while the Christian minority comprises between 30% and 35%.

In the pre-colonial period, the area that is now Gombe State was split up between various states until the early 1800s when the Fulani jihad seized much of the area to the Northern Gombe and formed the Gombe Emirate under the Sokoto Caliphate while the Tangale seized the Southern Area to establish their Maidom which has traceable history to ElKanemi - Maiduguri migration. In the 1910s, British expeditions occupied the Emirate and the surrounding areas, incorporating them into the Northern Nigeria Protectorate which later merged into British Nigeria before becoming independent as Nigeria in 1960. Originally, modern-day Gombe State was a part of the post-independence Northern Region until 1967 when the region was split and the area became part of the North-Eastern State. After the North-Eastern State was split, Bauchi State was formed in 1976 alongside ten other states. Twenty years afterwards, a group of LGAs in Bauchi's west were broken off to form the new Gombe State.

Economically, Gombe State is largely based around agriculture, mainly of sorghum, maize, groundnuts, millet, beans, rice and tomatoes mostly in the Central and Southern axis. Other key industries are services, especially in the city of Gombe, and the herding of camels, cattle, goats, and sheep which are predominantly in the Northern axis of the state. Gombe has the fourth lowest Human Development Index and one of the lowest GDPs in the country.

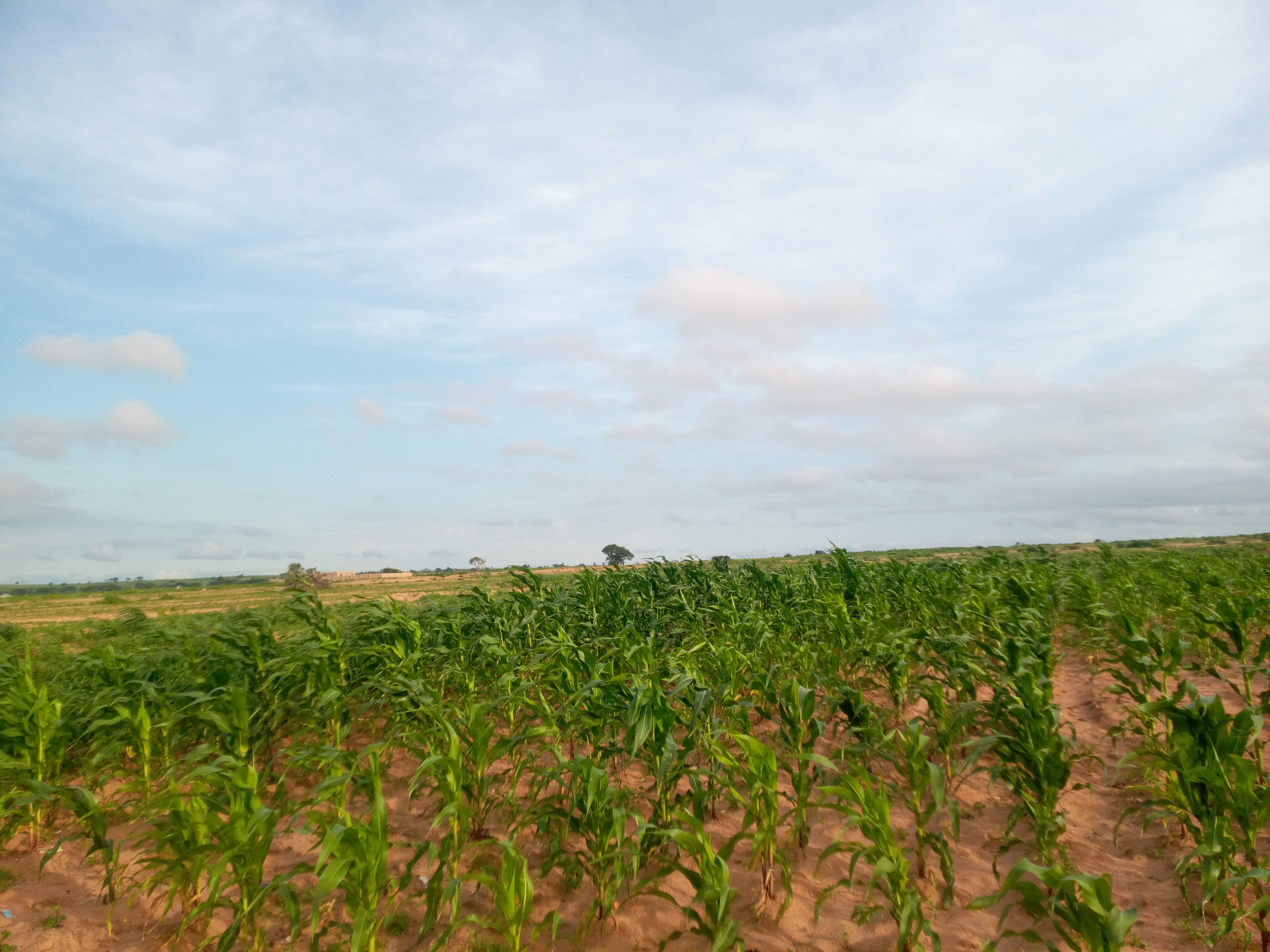
Agriculture in Gombe State, Akko LGA

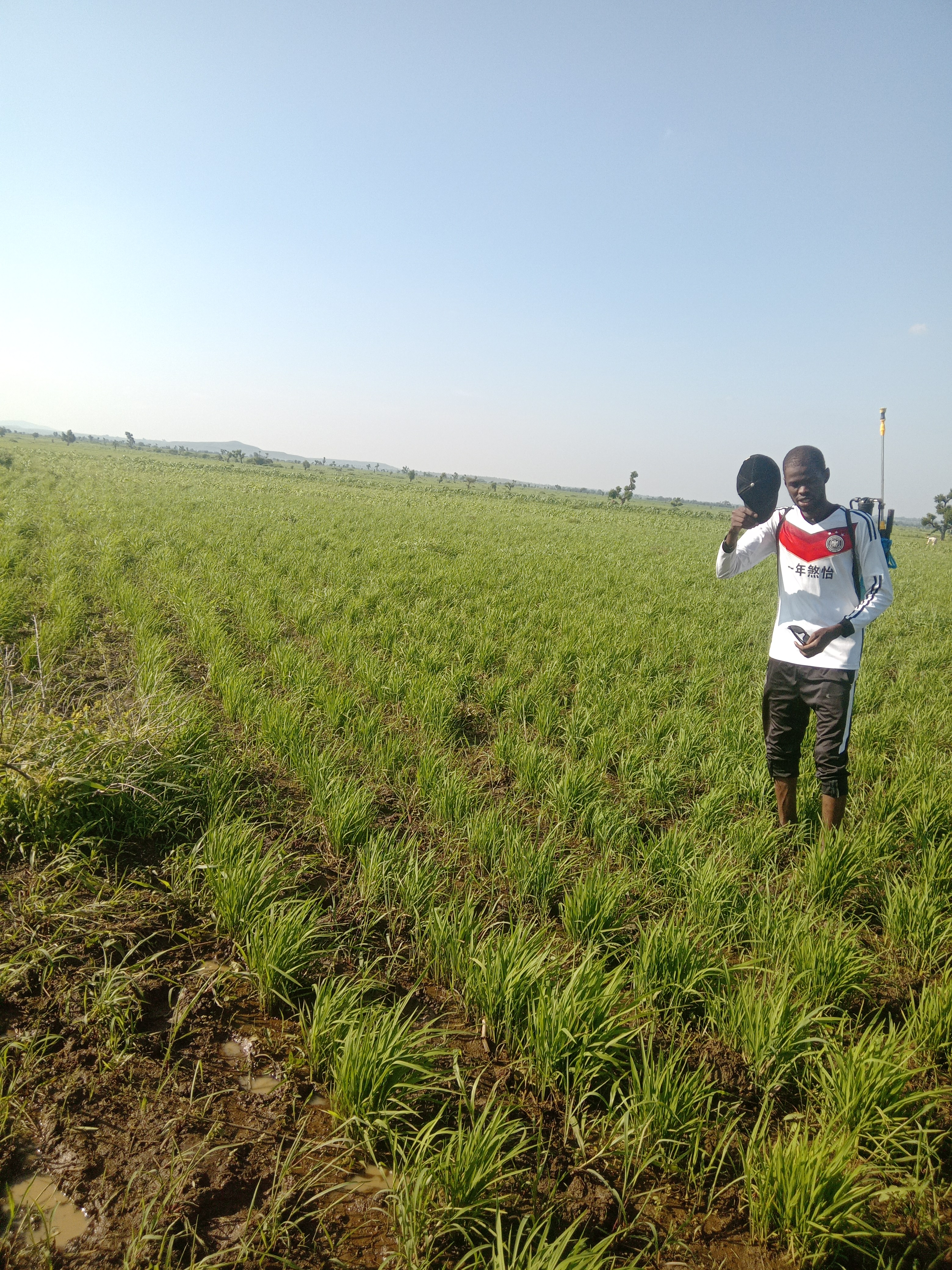
Agriculture in Gombe state

== Overview ==
The state has an area of 20,265 km^{2} and a population of around 2,365,000 people as of 2006.

It was formed in October 1996, from part of the old Bauchi State by the Abacha military government. The state is located in Nigeria's Guinea savannah and Sudan savannah belts. Undulating hills, sandy rocks, and a few volcanic rocks make up the landscape. Its location in the northeastern zone, right within the expansive savannah, allows the state to share common borders with the states of Borno, Yobe, Taraba, Adamawa and Bauchi.

== Local Government Areas ==
Gombe State consists of eleven local government areas. They are:

LGA	Area (km^{2})	Census 2006 population	Administrative capital	Postal code
Akko	2,627	337,853	Kumo	771
Balanga	1,626	212,549	Tallase	761
Billiri	737	202,144	Billiri	771
Dukku	3,815	207,190	Dukku	760
Funakaye	1,415	236,087	Bajoga	762
Gombe	52	268,000	Gombe (city)	760
Kaltungo	881	149,805	Kaltungo	770
Kwami	1,787	195,298	Mallam Sidi	760
Nafada	1,586	138,185	Nafada	762
Shongom	922	151,520	Boh	770
Yamaltu/Deba	2,181	355,248	Deba	761

== Demographics ==
Gombe State is a multi-ethnic society that consists of the majority Fulani and Tangale tribe, who inhabit the northern, southern and central parts of the state, but in reality Fulani are the largest tribe in Gombe State. The Fulani are in 6 while the Tangale are also in 2 out of the 11 Local Government Areas of the state. These include Dukku, Funakaye, Nafada, Akko, Kwami and Gombe LGAs while for Tangale it includes Billiri and Kaltungo LGAs. Apart from the Fulani and The Tangale. Other ethnicities include the Hausa, Tula, Longuda (Lunguda), Dadiya, Waja, Bangunji, Filiya, Awak, Tera (Yamaltu-Deba), Waja, Bolewa, and Kanuri, with their different cultural as well as lingual affiliations.

=== Religion ===
75-80% Muslim, 20-25% Christian, including the Anglican Diocese of Gombe (1999) led by Bishop Cletus Tambari (2020), within the Province of Jos of the Church of Nigeria. The Roman Catholic Diocese of Bauchi (1996) includes Gombe with 92,620 followers in 28 parishes under Bishop Hilary Nanman Dachelem (as of 2017).

=== Politics ===
The state government is led by a democratically elected governor who works closely with members of the state's House of Assembly.

The capital city of the state is Gombe.

The electoral system of each state is selected using a modified two-round system. To be elected in the first round, a candidate must receive the plurality of the vote and over 25% of the vote in at least two-thirds of the state local government areas. If no candidate passes the threshold, a second round will be held between the top candidate and the next candidate to have received a plurality of votes in the highest number of local government areas.

== Languages ==
Languages of Gombe State, listed by LGA:

LGA	Languages
Akko	Fulani, Jukun, Tangale
Balanga	Bangwinji, Centúúm, Dadiya, Dera, Dikaka, Dza, Kyak, Longuda, Moo, Tangale, Tso, Waja
Billiri	Tangale
Dukku	Fulani, Bolewa
Funakaye	Fulani
Kaltungo	Awak, Tangale, Tula, Kamo, Yuwar, Cham
Kwami	Fulani, Kanuri
Nafada	Fulani, Bolewa
Shongom	Tangale, Kushi, Moo, Loo, Wurkun, Pipero
Yamaltu-Deba	Tera, Fulani

== Politics ==
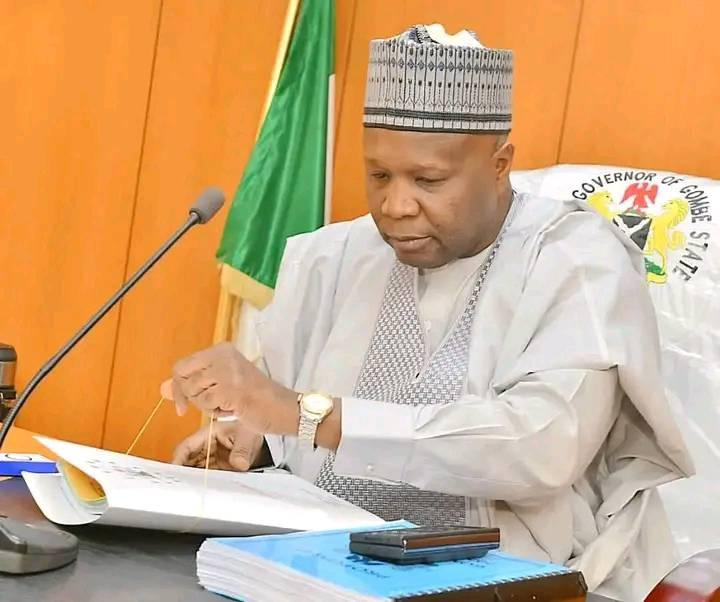
Governor of Gombe State. Muhammad Inuwa Yahya

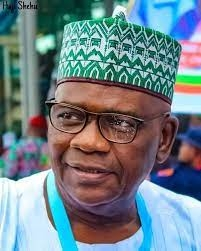
Muhammad Damjuma Goje. Past Governor of Gombe State and Current Senator

The state is headed by the Executive Governor Muhammad Inuwa Yahaya and also has 24 State House Assembly members. Gombe has 11 local government areas and 14 emirates/chiefdoms. It has three Senators and six Members in the National Assembly.

=== Governors ===
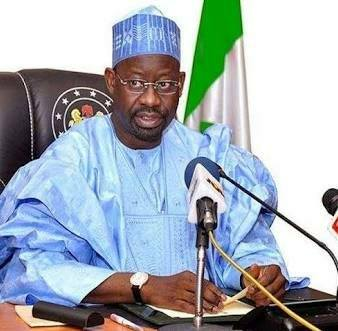
Ibrahim Hassan Dankwambo. Past Governor of Gombe State and Current in House of Assembly

This is a list of administrators and governors of Gombe State.

Name	Title	Took office	Left office	Party
Group Captain Joseph Orji	Administrator	7 October 1996	Aug 1998	Military
Abubakar Habu Hashidu	Governor	29 May 1999	29 May 2003	APP
Mohammed Danjuma Goje	Governor	29 May 2003	May 2011	PDP
Ibrahim Hassan Dankwambo	Governor	May 2011	29 May 2019	PDP
Muhammad Inuwa Yahaya	Governor	May 2019	Date	APC

== Rulers ==
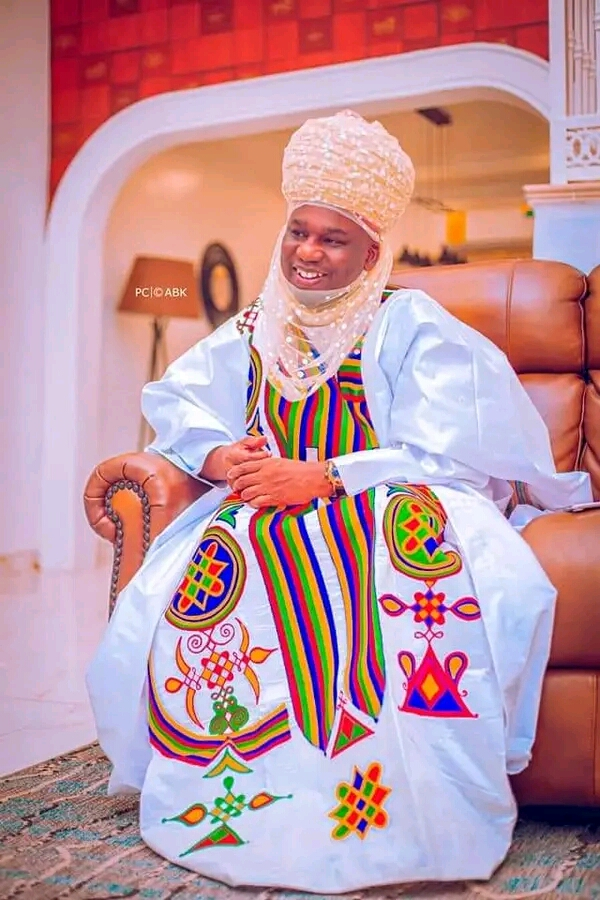
Abubakar Shehu-Abubakar The current Emir of Gombe State

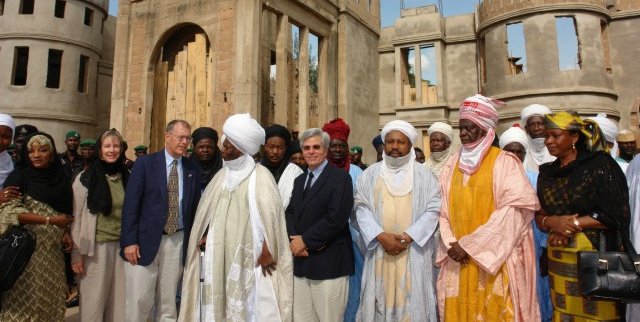
The late Emir of Gombe. His Royal Highness, Alhaji Shehu Usman Abubakar From January 1984 to May 2014

Rulers of Gombe Emirate:

Start	End	Ruler
1804	1841	Abubakar "Buba Yero" dan Usman Subande (b. c.1762 – d. 1841)
1841	1844	Sulaymanu dan Abubakar (d. 1844)
1844	1882	Muhammadu Kwairanga dan Abi Bakar (d. 1882)
1882	1888	Abd al-Qadiri Zaylani dan Muhammadu (d. 1888)
1888	1895	Hasan dan Muhammadu (d. 1895)
1895	1898	Tukur dan Muhammadu (d. 1898)
1898	1898	Jalo dan Muhammadu
1898	1922	Umaru dan Muhammadu (d. 1922)
1922	1935	Haruna dan Umaru (d. 1935)
January 1936	January 1984	Abu Bakar dan Umaru (b. 1902)
January 1984	27 May 2014	Shehu Usman Abubakar
June 2014	Present	Abubakar Shehu Abubakar III (b. 1977)

== State agencies ==
=== Water Board ===
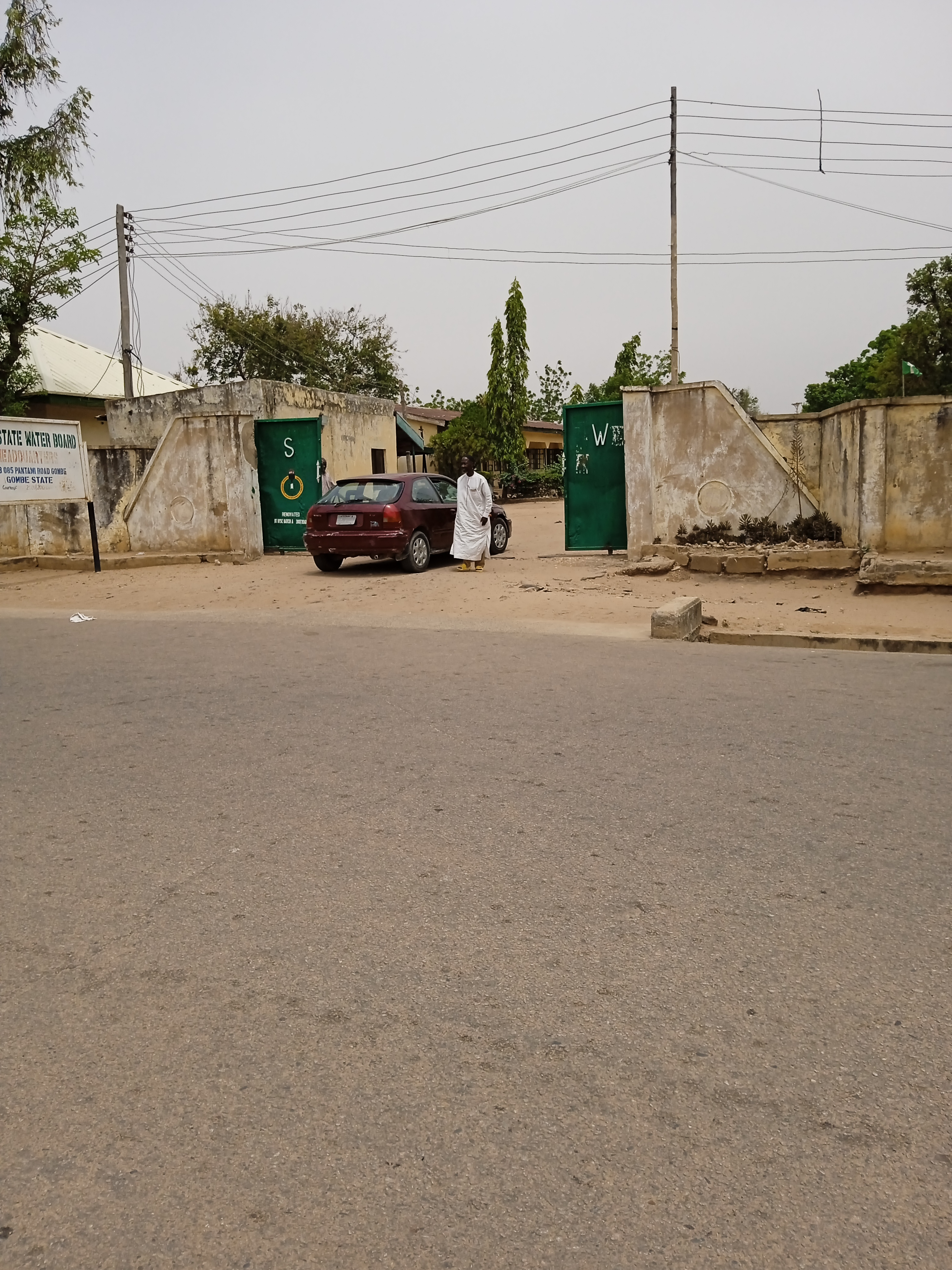
Main entrance of Gombe State Water Board

Gombe State Water Board is a state government organisation that provides water for domestic, industrial and commercial purposes. It is governed by a board of directors appointed by the state governor, with a chairman, a chief executive or chief manager, and nine other members. They all serve on a part-time basis, other than the General Manager.

=== Gombe Geographic Information System ===
Gombe Geographic Information System (GOGIS) is a digitalised land administrative system that carries out the process of determining, recording, and disseminating information about land acquisition, ownership, value and land management policies in Gombe State.

=== Gombe State Urban Planning and Development Authority ===
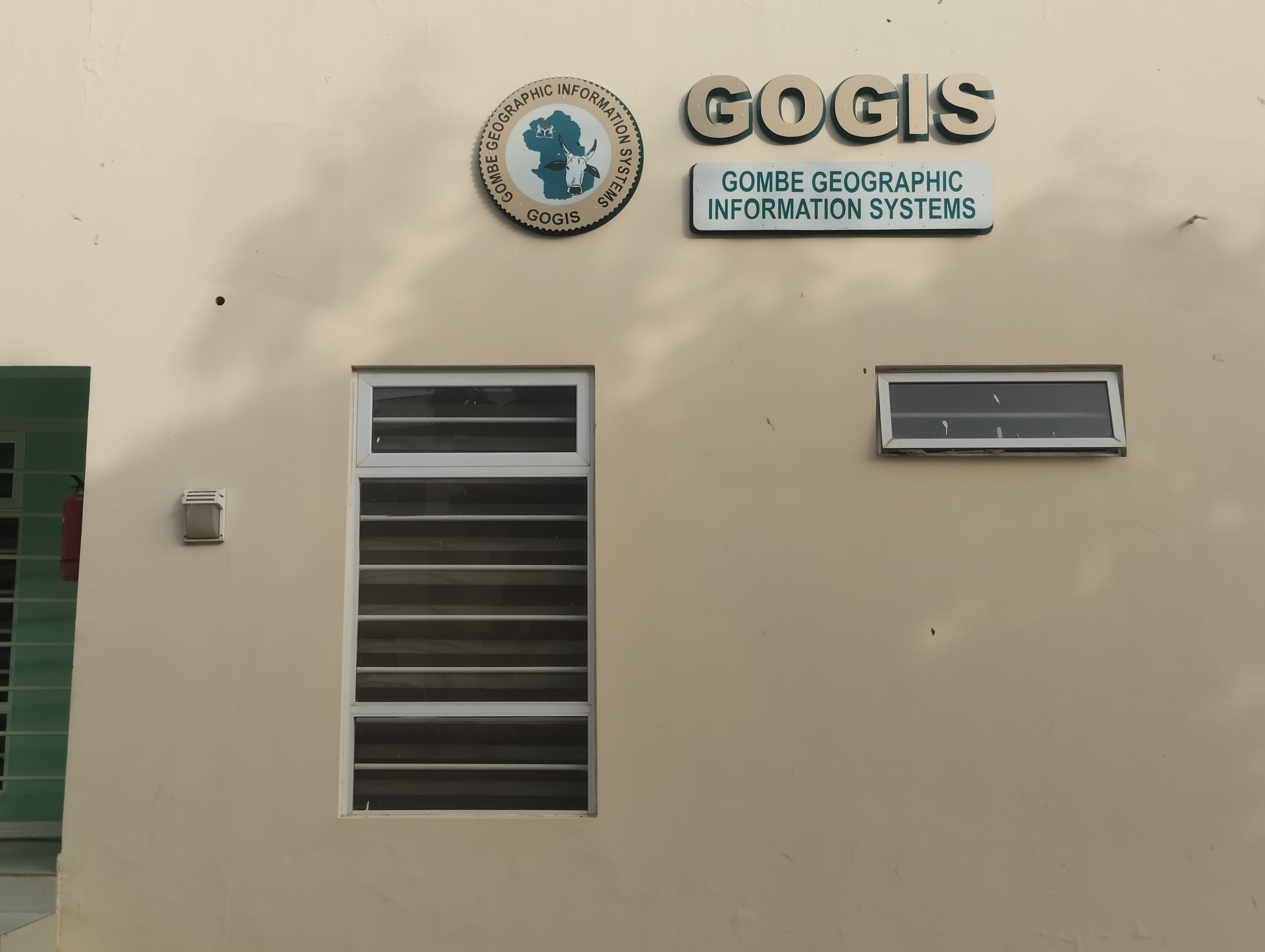
Gombe geography information system

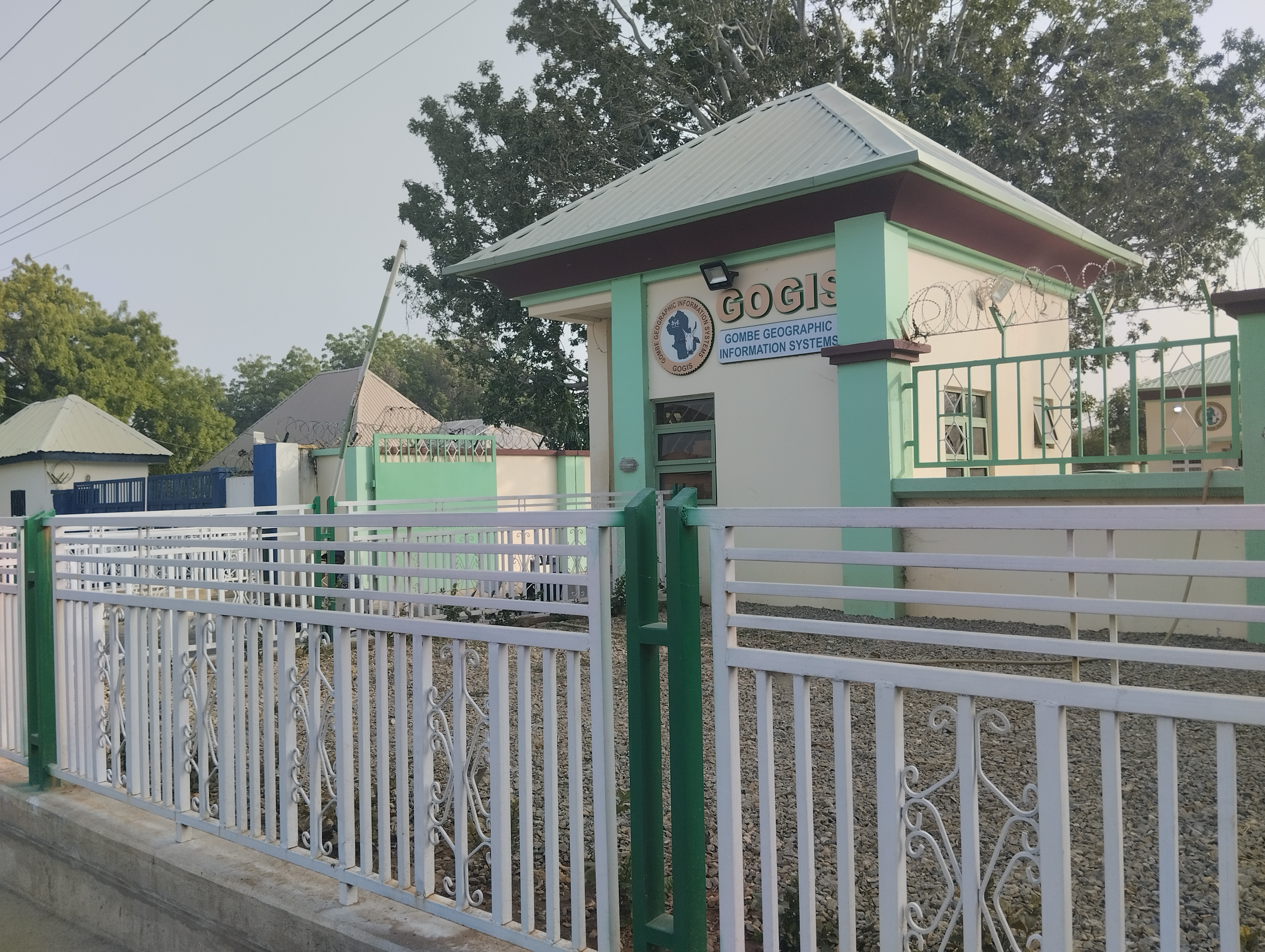
Gombe geography information system main office

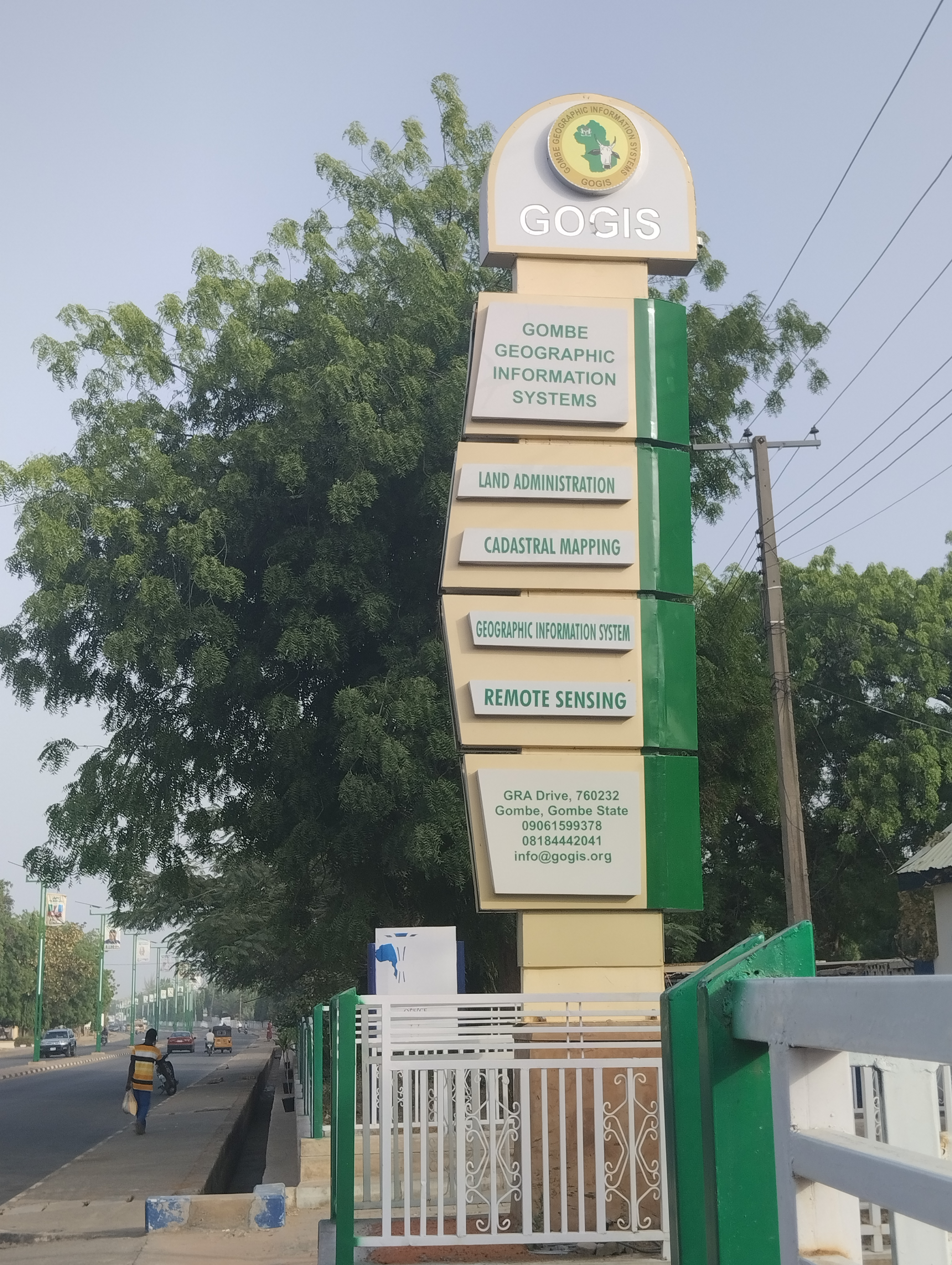
Gombe geography information system

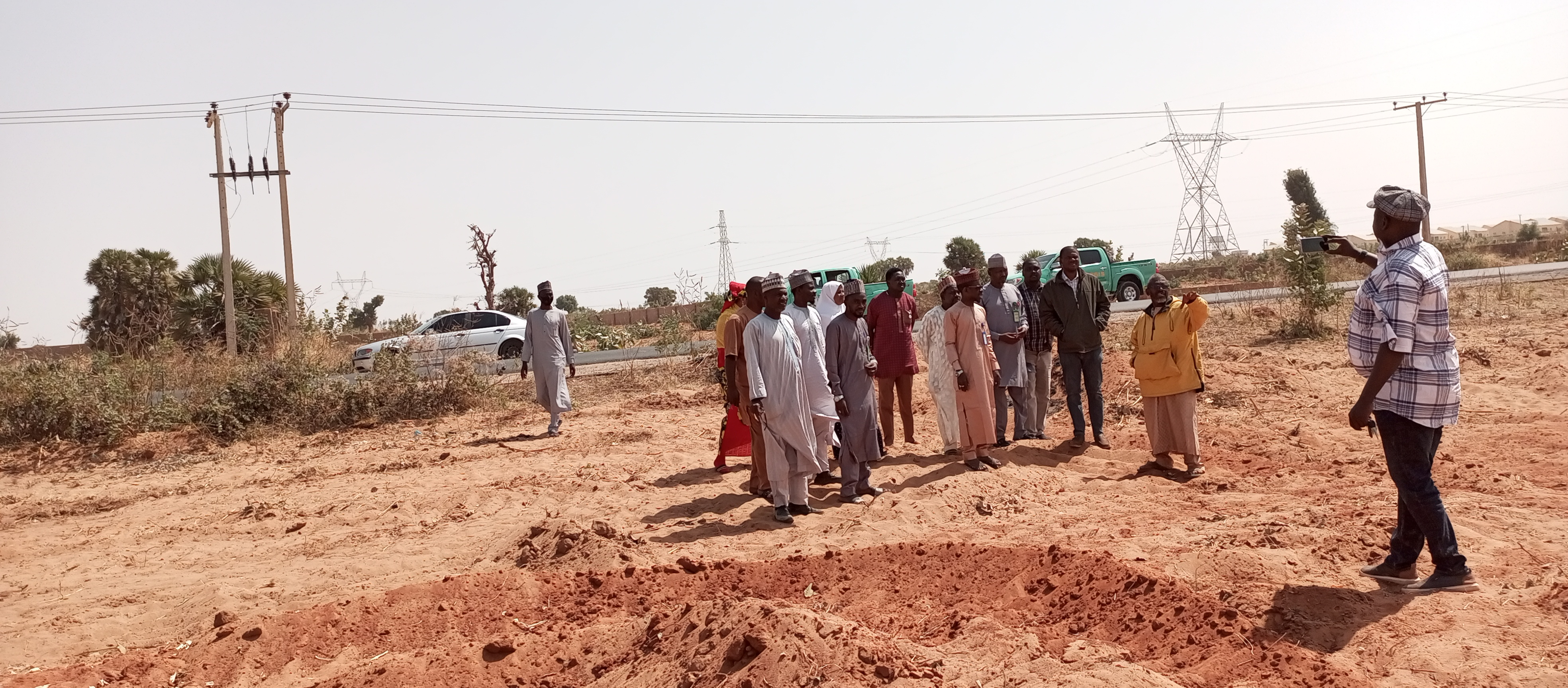
Director of Gombe geography information system and the Technical teams

Gombe State Urban Planning and Development Authority (GOSPUDA) facilitates and enforces planning regulations for the development of the Gombe State by issuing and regulating building approval for individuals or organizations that wish to develop their land.

== Climate ==
The dry season in Gombe is partly cloudy, and the city has year-round high temperatures. The wet season is unpleasant and overcast. The temperature rarely falls below 52 °F or rises over 105 °F throughout the year, often ranging from 57 °F to 100 °F.

Gombe has two distinct climates, the dry season (November–March) and the rainy season (April–October) with an average rainfall of 850 mm (2.79 ft).

=== Average Temperature ===
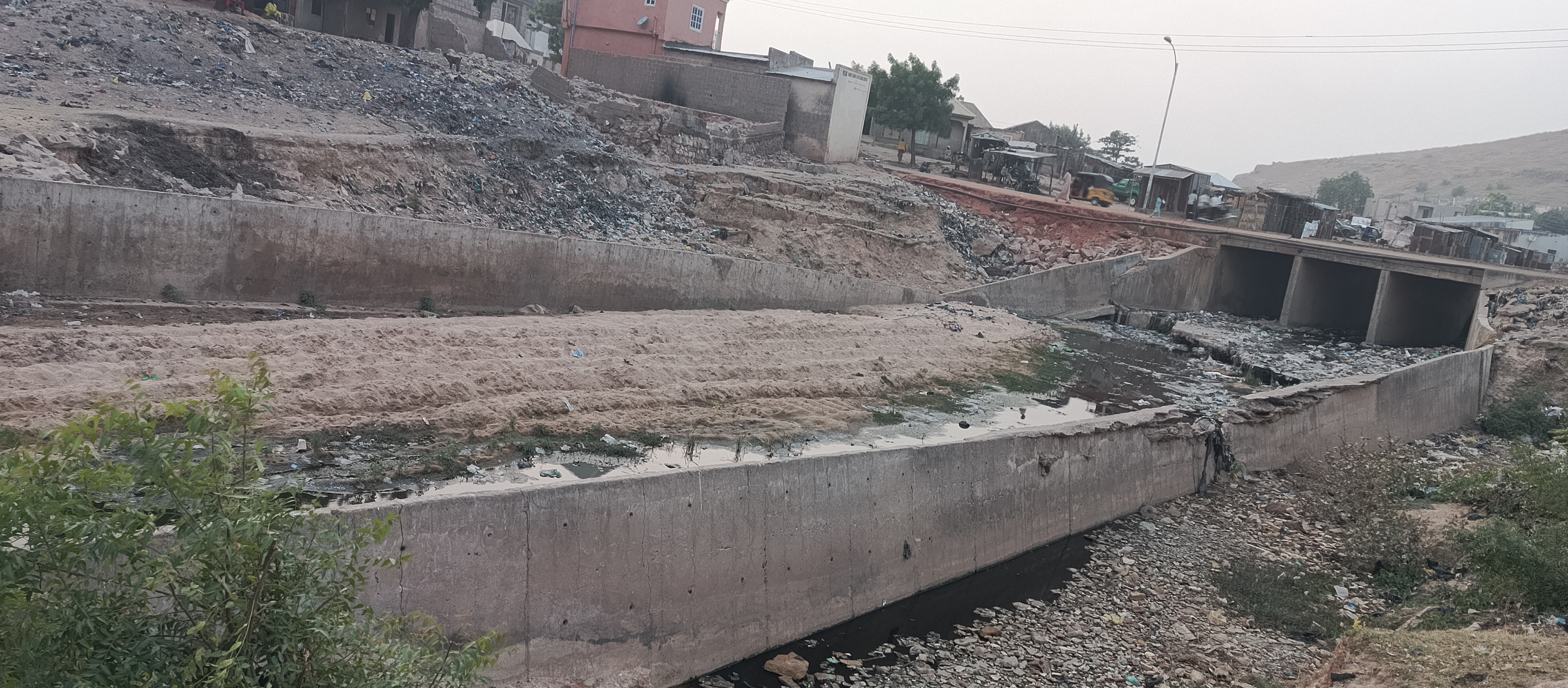
Erosion in Gombe

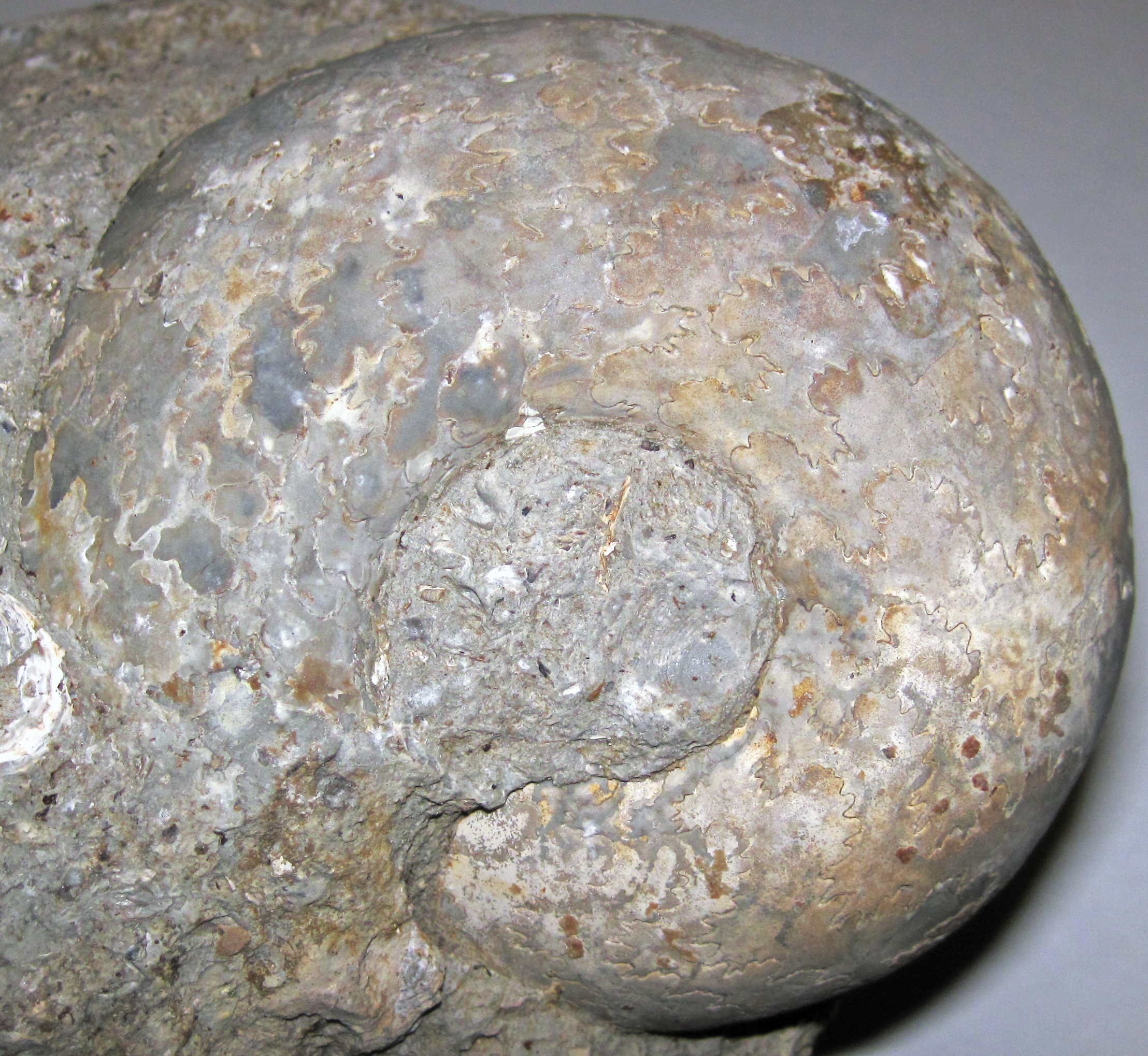
Vascoceras sp. (fossil ammonite) (Upper Cretaceous; Gombe region, Nigeria

With an average daily high temperature of 97 °F, the hot season spans 2.3 months, from 17 February to 26 April. At 98 °F on average for highs and 74 °F for lows, April is the hottest month of the year in Gombe. With an average daily maximum temperature below 86 °F, the cool season spans 3.1 months, from 6 July to 9 October. With an average low temperature of 58 °F and high temperature of 90 °F, December is the coldest month of the year in Gombe.

=== Environment ===
==== Afforestation ====
The Gombe State Government has started a four million tree planting programme as part of a renewed effort to stop deforestation in the North Central Zone.

It is anticipated that the four-year plan, which would be implemented in parts. The first part of the scheme has already seen the government plant 1.3 million tree saplings.

==== Flood Control ====
The state government has taken preventive steps to lessen the impact of the impending floods and other environmental problems that are expected to hit the state.

In order to protect people and property while minimizing the effects of upcoming weather events and their potentially fatal consequences, Governor Muhammadu Inuwa Yahaya has ordered the Ministry of Environment and Forest Resources to coordinate with pertinent stakeholders and activate state emergency response and management resources.

In a recent report, heavy flooding in the State, has caused the destruction of 171 houses within a span of two months. The floods, have displaced numerous households and disrupted lives. The Gombe State Emergency Management Agency (SEMA) confirmed that nearly 1,000 households have been affected overall since the start of the 2025 rainy season, with 15 reported deaths linked to flood-related incidents. Localities such as Jurara in Kwami LGA and Jalingon Kamu in Kaltungo LGA have recorded displacements, with residents often relying on community support for refuge. The floods have inflicted damage on infrastructure and agricultural lands, further increasing the challenges faced by the affected populations. Response efforts by state agencies and humanitarian partners continue, focusing on relief provision, including shelter, food, and medical assistance.

== Erosion ==
Gombe State is still reeling from the devastating effects of a gully erosion that destroyed farmlands worth millions of Naira and damaged more than 200 homes. Despite state government efforts to lessen its effects, the gully erosions which particularly affected the Bogo neighborhood within the city have not been fully controlled.

== Air pollution ==
In Gombe, the air quality is acceptable except for a very small number of people who are unusually sensitive to air pollution, to whom some pollutants may pose a moderate health risk.

== Education ==
Secondary Schools.

- JIBWIS Islamic Science and Secondary School, Gombe.
- Pen Resource Academy.
- Government Science Secondary School.
- Government Comprehensive Day Secondary School.
- Matrix International Academy.

Universities

- Gombe State University
- Federal University Kashere.
- North-Eastern University, Gombe
- Jewel University, Gombe

Colleges

- Federal College of Education (Tech) Gombe.
- Federal College of Horticulture Dadin-Kowa.
- College of Health Sciences and Technology Kaltungo.
- Gombe State College of Nursing and Midwifery.

== Health ==
- Federal Teaching Hospital, Gombe.
- Specialist Hospital Gombe.
- Federal Medical Center, Kumo.
- Zainab Bulkacuwa Women and Children Hospital Gombe.

== Transport ==
Federal highways are:

- A338 north from Gombe 118 km as the Ashaka-Bajago Rd and the Tonde-Ngalda-Badejo Rd to Yobe State at Ngalda as the Jangadoli-Fuka-Ngalalda Rd, and
- A345 as the Bachi-Bara-Gombe Rd east from Bauchi State at Wuro Dole and south and east from Gombe as the Gombe-Yola Rd via Kumo, Kalmai, Kaltungo Boha and Bambam as the Lafia-Ture-Wuro-Biriji Rd to Adamawa State near Tiksir.

Other major roads include:

- the Gombe-Wuyo-Biu Rd east to Borno State near Deba Kowa, and northwest from Gombe 80 km to Dukku.

Railways:

- The 1067 mm Cape gauge Eastern Line east from Bauchi State via Gombe to Borno State, and the Gombe Line into downtown Gombe.

Airports:

- Gombe Lawanti International

== Sports ==
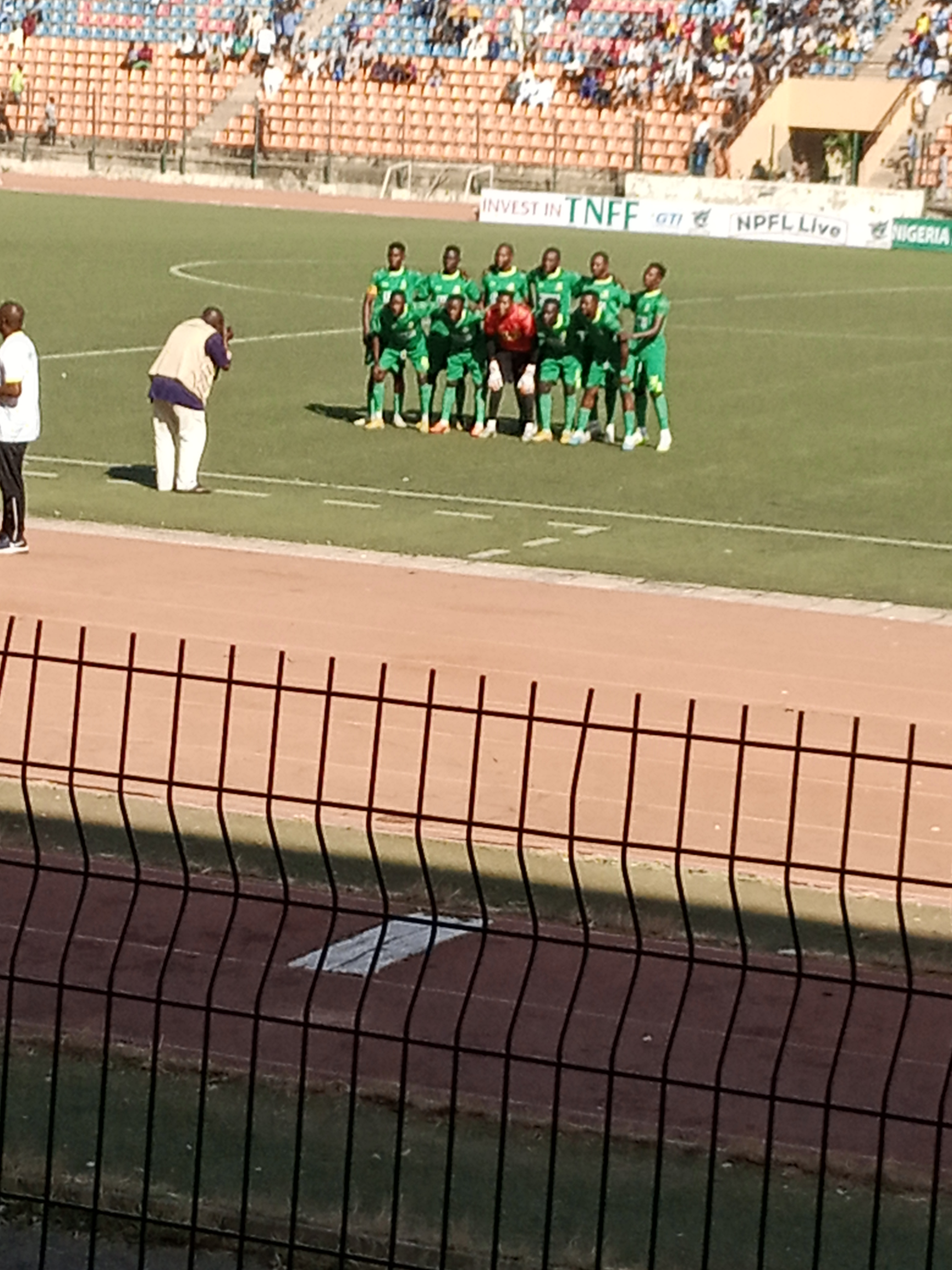
Gombe United FC

- Gombe United F.C.
- Doma United F.C Savannah Tigers.

== Notable people ==
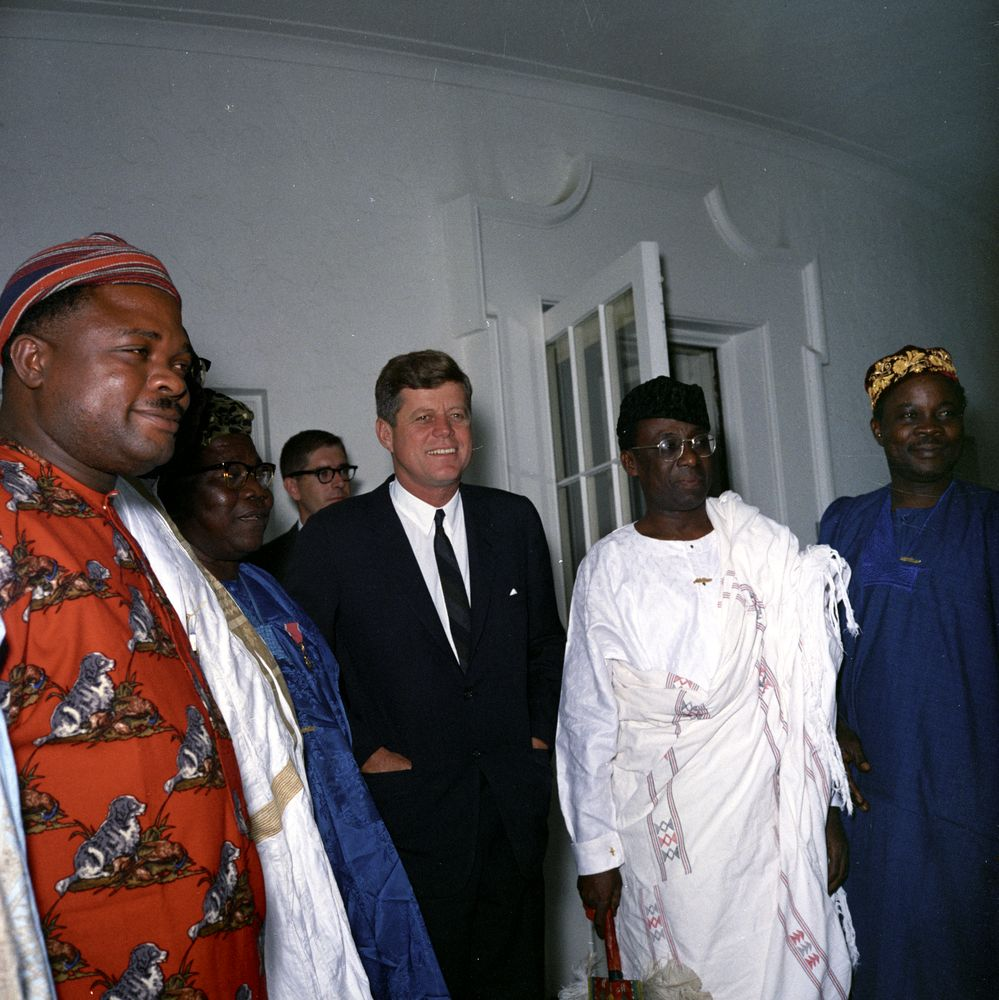
President John F. Kennedy visits with members of Parliament of Nigeria in the West Wing Colonnade of the White House, Washington, D.C. The Parliamentary delegation includes President of the Senate, Dennis Chukude Osadebay; Speaker of the House of Representatives, Ibrahim Jalo Waziri; Deputy Speaker of the House of Representatives, Emmanuel Chikere Akwiwu; members of the Senate, Dahlton O. Asemoto, Chief Z. C. Obi, and Zanna Medalla Sheriff; members of the House of Representatives, Mallam Muhammadu Sagir Umar and Chief Ohu Babatunde Akin-Olugbade; Staff Assistant to the delegation, J. O. Adeigbo.

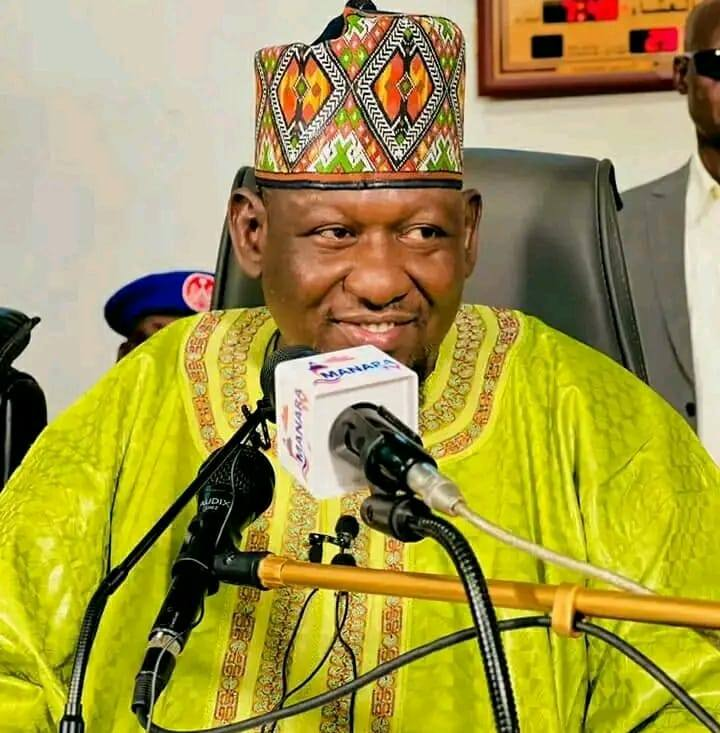
Sheikh Kabiru Haruna Gombe

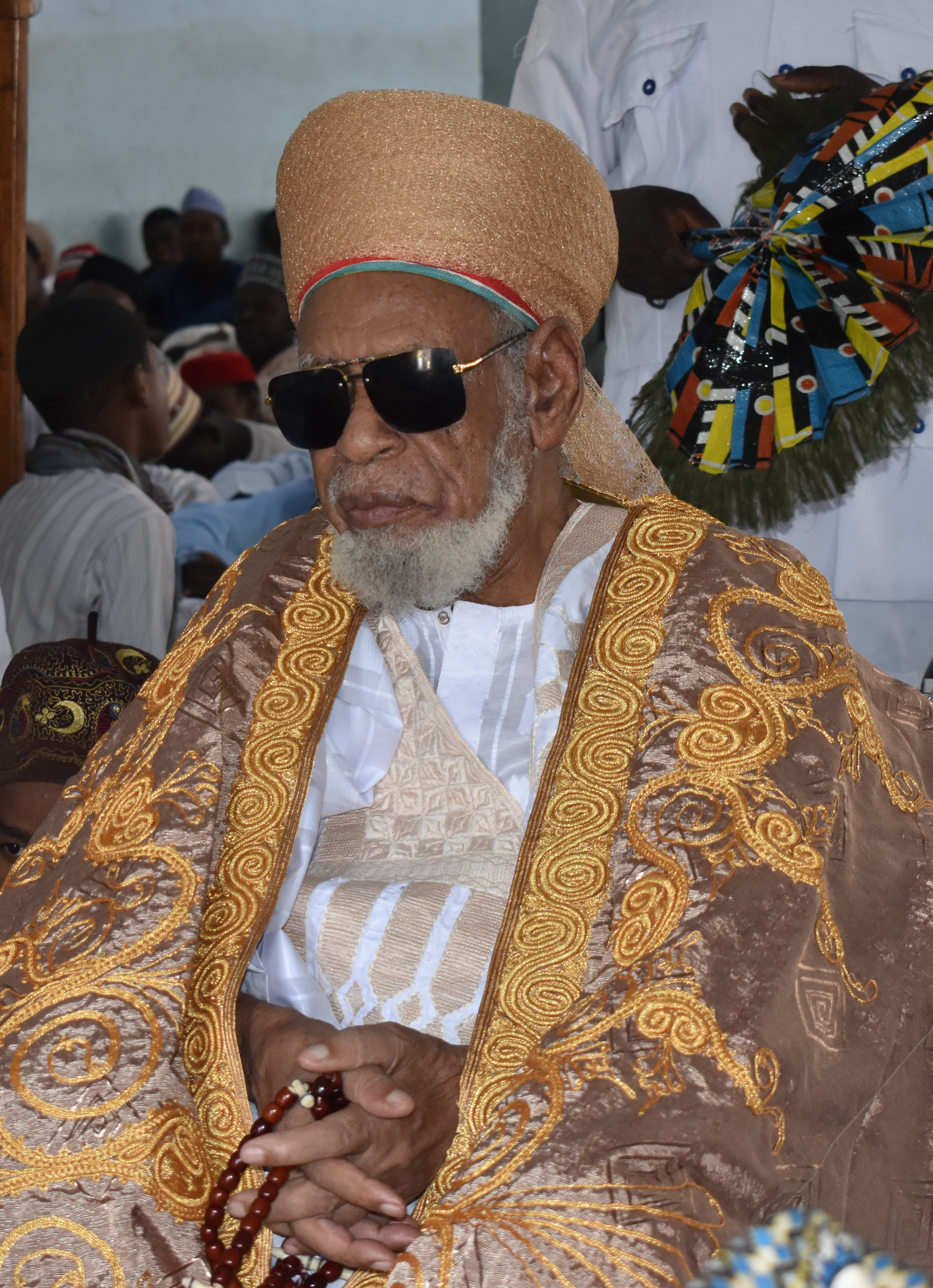
Sheikh Dahiru Usman Bauchi

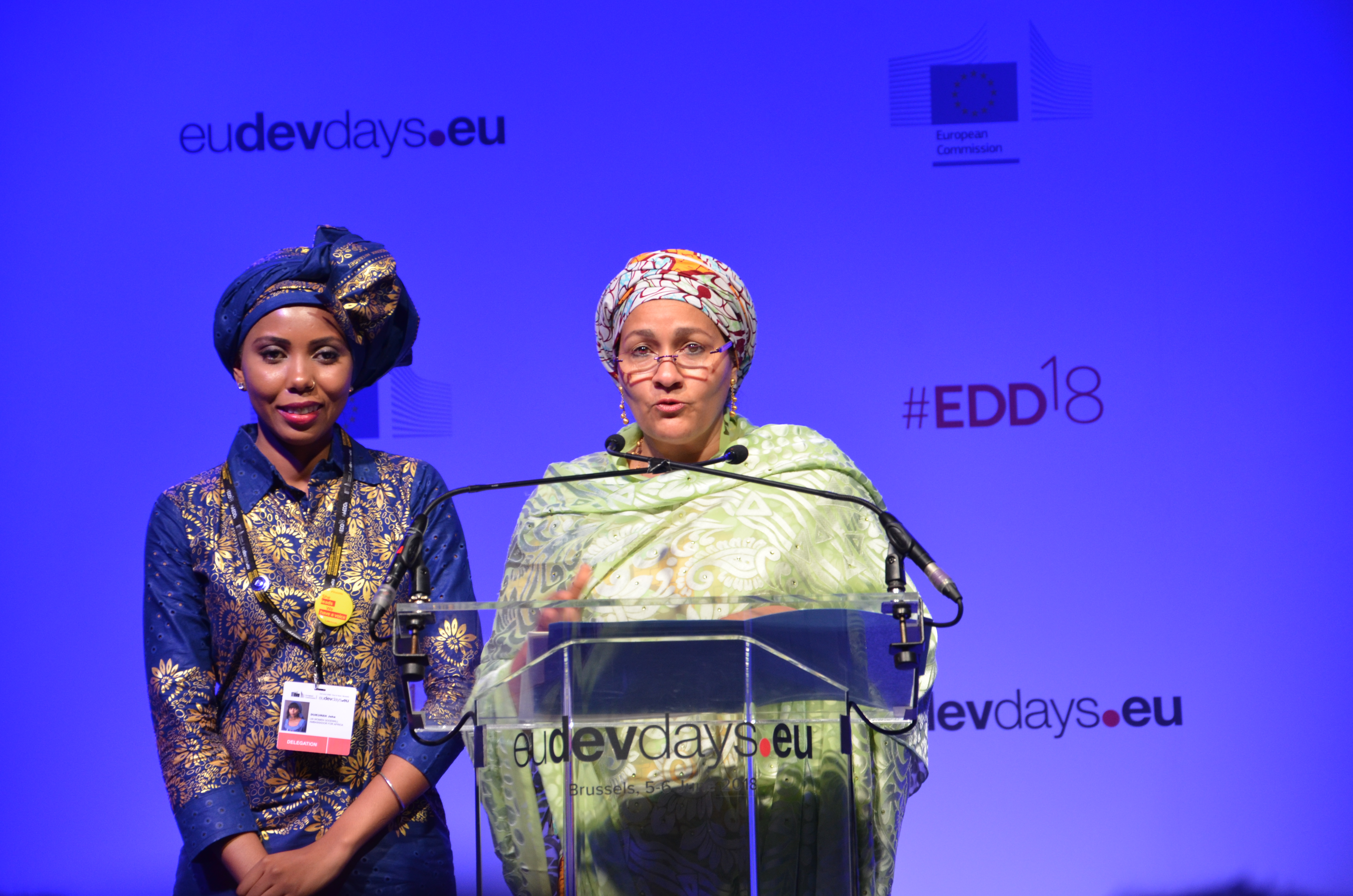
Amina J. Mohammed

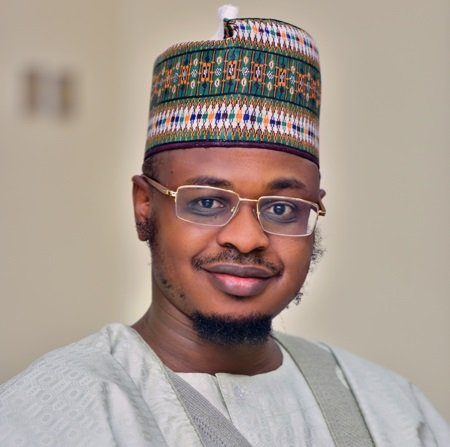
Issa Ali Pantami

- Amina J. Mohammed, (born 27 June 1961), former minister of Environment (2015-2016) UN deputy secretary
- Usman Faruk, the first military governor of the defunct northwestern state
- Sheikh Dahiru Bauchi, teacher, preacher
- Ibrahim Jalo Waziri, politician
- Sheikh Kabir Muhammad Haruna Gombe, preacher
- Isa Ali Pantami, (born 20 October 1972), preacher, a former NITDA Director-General from 26 September 2016 to 20 August 2019 and Minister of communication from 2019-2023.
- Danladi Mohammed, politician
- Joshua Lidani, (born 1 October 1957), a Nigerian politician is a former Senator for the Gombe South constituency of Gombe State, Nigeria from 2011 to 2015.
- Eli Jidere Bala, (born 19 September 1954) a mechanical engineer and Director-General of the Energy Commission of Nigeria (5 May 2013 – 5 May 2023).
- Usman Bayero Nafada, (born 2 January 1961), politician a former Deputy Speaker of the House of Representatives of Nigeria representing Dukku/Nafada Federal Constituency of Gombe state, from 2007 to 2011 and former Senator for the Gombe North senatorial district 2015.
- Samkon Gado, Nigerian-American otolaryngologist and American football player
- Zainab Adamu Bulkachuwa, (born March,1950), jurist, Former President of the Court of Appeal of Nigeria from 2014 to 2020.
- Jaaruma, entrepreneur
- Aliyu Modibbo Umar, politician
- Mohammed Danjuma Goje, (born 10 October 1952) Nigerian politician, former Gombe state Governor (2003-2011), and the senator for the Gombe central senatorial district from 2011 to date.
- Helon Habila, novelist
- Dahiru Mohammed, politician
- Abubakar Buba Atare, Emir of Tula Chiefdom
- Buba Yero, the first Emir of Gombe
- Abubakar Shehu-Abubakar, 11th Emir of Gombe
- Aliyu Usman El-Nafaty OFR, (born 25 December 1960), academic a Professor of Obstetrics & Gynaecology and Vice-chancellor of Gombe State University.
- Usman Bello Kumo
- Momee Gombe (Maimuna Gombe Abubakar)
- Saidu Ahmed Alkali. A Nigerian politician, a former Senator representing the Gombe North Senatorial District and the Minister of Transportation since 2023.
- Kawu Peto Dukku.(1958-2010) a Nigerian Politician and former Senator representing the Gombe North Senatorial District from 2007 to 2010.

== Media Stations ==
Gombe State has many media stations some of which are;

- Progress Radio and Television (97.3 MHz)
- Amana Radio FM(98.1 MHz)
- Gombe Media Cooperation Radio and Television (GMC)(91.9 MHz)
- Vision Radio FM (92.7 MHz)
- Radio Nigeria (Jewel FM)(103.5 MHz)

== Economy ==
Most of the population in Gombe State are farmers. Both food and cash crops are produced by them. Yam, cassava, maize, tomatoes, and groundnuts are some of its food crops, while cotton is grown for each.

These goods supply the raw materials for the state's agricultural industries, including the groundnut oil mill, cotton gin, and tomato plant. Cement production, furniture manufacturing, block production, and other small-scale businesses are additional industries.

Gombe has natural resources like uranium, gypsum, and limestone.

Recently, petroleum deposits were reported to have been discovered in the state.

== See also ==
- Religion in Gombe State
