= Funakaye =

- LGA
- Motto(s): Ndemen, Nduren, Njangen
- Interactive map of Funakaye
- Location in Nigeria
- Coordinates: 10°51′N 11°26′E
- Country: Nigeria
- State: Gombe State
- Headquarters: Bajoga

Government
  - Local Government Chairman: Alhaji Shuaibu Abdulrahman Adam

Area
  - Total: 1,415 km^{2} (546 sq mi)

Population (2006 census)
  - Total: 236,087
  - Density: 166.8/km^{2} (432.1/sq mi)
- Time zone: UTC+1 (WAT)
- 3-digit postal code prefix: 762
- ISO 3166 code: NG.GO.FU

funakaye.ogg

Funakaye is a Local Government Area of Gombe State, Nigeria. Its headquarters is in the town of Bajoga. Its current chairman is Alhaji Ibrahim Cheldu of the All Progressives Congress. Funakaye is bounded in the east by the Gongola River and Lake Dadin Kowa, beyond which lie Yobe State and Borno State.

It has an araa of 1,415 km^{2} and a population of 236,087 at the 2006 census. The postal code of the area is 762. The town got its name from the two Fulani words "funa" meaning "East" and "ka’e" meaning "rocks" which means "East rocks".

== Demography ==
Funakaye is inhabited dominantly by the Fulani people. Fulfulde is the most spoken language in the area. Hausa, Kanuri and Bolewa languages are also known and spoken by the inhabitants.

All indigenous people of Funakaye are Muslims . However, due to the abundant mineral resources in the area especially Limestone, there has been an influx of Christians from other part of Nigeria who had built churches in the area and are living peacefully with their hosts.

== Religion ==
Funakaye is a Local Government Area with majority of its people being Muslims and Christians are a minority.

== Mineral resources and development ==
Due to the local production of crops such sorghum, maize, beans, and millet, farming is a significant economic activity for the residents of Funakaye LGA.

Funakaye is blessed with minerals like bentonite and limestone, coal, gypsum, gold, gemstone, uranium, etc. However, Funakaye is the least developed LGA of the State. The people are living in abject poverty and the illiteracy rate is quite beyond that of all the other Local Government Areas in the state.

The French company Lafarge (company) has been operating in the area since the 1990s, mining limestone, coal, and other mineral resources amidst, though under allegations of not fulfilling its corporate social responsibility of bringing social amenities to the poor, uneducated locals whose environment has been polluted. Other allegations include the preference of employing non-indigenes over indigenes as against the state laws. The company had for so many times promised to alleviate poverty in the area but to no avail.

== Emir ==
The Emir of Funakaye, Alhaji Mu’azu Muhammad Kwairanga III, died at the age of 45 on Saturday, 27 August.

Late Alhaji Mu’azu Muhammad Kwairanga III was succeeded by Alhaji Yakubu Muhammad Kwairanga IV, appointed by the Executive Governor of Gombe State, Alhaji Muhammadu Inuwa Yahaya on 21 November 2022.

== Climate ==
In Bajoga, a town in Funakaye, the wet season is hot, oppressive, and mostly cloudy and the dry season is sweltering and partly cloudy. Over the course of the year, the temperature typically varies from 60 °F to 104 °F and is rarely below 55 °F or above 108 °F.

== Health facilities ==
Funakaye Local Government Area (LGA) in Gombe State, Nigeria, is served by a network of public primary and secondary health facilities that provide healthcare services to both urban and rural communities. Although the area has historically faced infrastructural challenges, recent health sector reforms by the Gombe State Government, supported by federal authorities and international development partners, have improved access to healthcare services across the LGA.

=== Secondary health facilities ===
Secondary health facilities in Funakaye LGA provide more advanced medical services than primary healthcare centres. These services typically include inpatient care, emergency services, surgical procedures, diagnostic support, and specialist consultations.

==== Funakaye General Hospital ====
Funakaye General Hospital (also locally known as Bajoga General Hospital) is the principal secondary health facility in Funakaye LGA. It serves as a referral centre for surrounding primary healthcare facilities within the LGA and neighbouring communities.

The hospital provides a range of services, including:

- Inpatient medical care
- Emergency and trauma services
- Surgical procedures and theatre services
- Specialist outpatient consultations

Funakaye General Hospital is part of the public health system managed by the Gombe State Government. The facility is also an approved service provider under the Gombe State Contributory Healthcare Scheme (GoHealth), which aims to improve access to healthcare and reduce out-of-pocket medical expenses for residents, particularly vulnerable populations.

=== Primary health facilities ===
Primary health facilities form the foundation of healthcare delivery in Funakaye LGA. These facilities provide preventive and basic curative services such as antenatal care, immunisation, family planning, maternal and child health services, and treatment of common illnesses. Gombe State has prioritised the revitalisation of primary healthcare centres across all LGAs to strengthen rural healthcare delivery.

==== Mutuke Maternity Clinic ====
Mutuke Maternity Clinic is a primary healthcare facility located in Funakaye LGA. The clinic focuses mainly on maternal and child health services and provides:

- Antenatal care and pregnancy monitoring
- Childhood immunisation services
- Basic maternal and newborn healthcare services

Mutuke Maternity Clinic is part of the wider network of revitalised primary healthcare facilities in Gombe State aimed at reducing maternal and infant mortality and improving community-level health outcomes.

=== Other primary health facilities in Funakaye LGA ===
In addition to Mutuke Maternity Clinic, other primary healthcare facilities serving communities within Funakaye LGA include:

- Sangaru Primary Health Centre – providing antenatal, maternal, child health, and basic curative services.
- Guiwa Primary Health Clinic, Ribadu – offering immunisation and maternal healthcare services.
- Jillahi Primary Health Centre – delivering frontline preventive and basic healthcare services at the community level.

=== Healthcare development in Gombe State ===
Gombe State has implemented major health sector reforms, including the upgrading and revitalisation of over 100 primary healthcare centres across the state through partnerships with the World Bank-supported IMPACT project. These upgrades include improved infrastructure, solar-powered facilities, medical equipment, and enhanced staffing aimed at improving maternal and child health outcomes.

The Federal Government of Nigeria has also supported healthcare delivery in the state by providing medical equipment and essential supplies to strengthen primary healthcare services across LGAs, including Funakaye.
