= List of villages in Gombe State =

This is a list of villages and settlements in Gombe State, Nigeria organised by local government area (LGA) and district/area (with postal codes also given).

== By Postal Code ==
LGA	District / Area	Postal code	Villages
Akko	Gona	771104	Akko; Auwaru; Barri; Dabawo; Gamadadi; Garko; Gokaru; Gona; Gujuba; Jangiro; Kalshingi; Lafiyawo; Lawanti; Munda; Panbo; Shulto; Tongo; Tukulma; Tunfure; Wuro Dole; Wuru Siddiki; Yankari; Zange; Zangomari
Akko	Kumo	771102	Garin Garba; Jalingo; Jauro Tukur; Kembu; Kumo; Lergo; Mararraban-Tumu; Nahuta; Panda; Shabbal
Akko	Pindiga	771103	Bubu; Dongol; Kaltanga; Kashere; Kilawa; Kombani; lara; Papa; Pindiga; Piyau; Solok; Tulmi; Tumu; Wudil; Yarda; Yelwa; Zabin Kani
Balanga	Balanga	761118	Balanga Garu; Gangaware; Jama`are; Jungwangwan; Kondi; Lauyou; Sabon Gida
Balanga	Bambam	761124	Bajoga; Bakin Kasuwa; Bare Jong; Faruku; Gada; Gadamayo; Gindin Dutse; Gwadabe; Jauro Tukur; Kashere; Kukumeti; Kwata; Lambawa; Makera; Nasarawo; Taliyayi; Tasha; Yarbawa; Yola
Balanga	Bangu	761109	Bangu Garu; Baure; Bokabundi; Daurawa; Laura; Sabon Layi; Shangi; Yobuyo; Zangayari
Balanga	Cham-mwona	761126	Bare; Buler; Dongaje; Fitilai; Kutared; Kwarge; Kwarge-Sabon-Layi; Lakun Babba; Lakun Tela; Lojah; Lojah-Fulani; Mwona Tari; Sabon Layi; Silon
Balanga	Chum- Kindiyo	761105	Buwangal; Dakawal; Dongaje; Fumur; Gwenti; Hausawa; Ketare; Kulo; Kumtur; Kwari; Kwasi; Kwata; Labun; Lwebe; Tiksir; Yadi; Yolde
Balanga	Daduya Hill	761105	Bormai Dadiya; Dogon Dutse; Dorawa; Gadan Taba; Kafin Bawa; Lobware; Lofiyo; Lokulakuli; Loluba; Loteni; Loyila; Loyilme; Maitunku; Sabara; Sabon Layi; Sabon Layi Maitunku; Unguwan Magaji; Yelwa; Yemfiyo
Balanga	Dala- Waja	761113	Batumi; Dele; Demi; Dimori; Fulani; Garu; Kodishere; Kumi; Kwasilau
Balanga	Degri	761119	Baginere; Birwe; Ching; Degri; Fulani; Gelengu; Kali; Kuki; Kwana; Lagulane; Luni; Putoki; Tudun Wada
Balanga	Dong	761108	Dong Garu; Fulani; Junge
Balanga	Gasi	761112	Daban Magarya; Gamadadi; Garin Fada; Katsinawa; Maidara; Pangilang
Balanga	Gelengu	761104	Balamsane; Dai; Felfeli; Gelengu-Fulani; Gelengu-Garu; Gonongu; Gukai; Gumsa; Jalingo; Kembi-Mainja; Kwakwari; Shijan; Takassa; Zongo
Balanga	Jessu	761121	Do`Ara; Gabekecham; Gulnyimora; Heme; Kwarawa; Sabon Layi
Balanga	Kulani	761116	Bila; Butta; Chamchiyo; Chessi; Chiffe; Gurma; Kauye; Konogwarau; Kore; Kulani Diyo; Kwangu; Laman; Pida Jawan; Sai; Swali; Swelbwalai; Tikire; Unguwan Ardo; Unguwan Batari; Unguwan Gurkuma
Balanga	Nyuwar	761117	Chunyi; Gilengitu; Gulnyimora
Balanga	Nyuwar	761123	Jakure; Pwalali; Tsibo; Tswaku; Unguwan Lilani
Balanga	Refele	761110	Bussi; Daura Babba; Daura Karami; Gufurunde; Jama`are; Jangai; Kolaku; Kumoyel; Makera; Nasarawa; Refele; Tattabaru; Tudun-Wada; Yakurutu
Balanga	Reme	761115	Dongole; Fulani; Geng; Guka; Gukurmi; Jamjara; Kolali; Nadiya
Balanga	Sikkam	761120	Birane; Bwalu; Dadiyo; Garui; Jone; Sikkam; Sikkam Kufai; Tamsuru; Tuku Garu; Walnyu; Yang
Balanga	Swa	761111	Bushen Ganki; Dasa Buzu; Desheru; Swa Garu; Wadaci
Balanga	BmTalasse	761103	Dibachingi; Jalingo; Jongri; Jurare; Nasarawa; Nyapawa; Parasole; Sabon Layi; Tindi; Wurodole
Balanga	Wala-longuda	761114	Dundunkurwa; Gwakala; Lafiya Sarki; Lebe; Sabon Layi; Tiyakunu
Balanga	Wala-waja	761122	Garu; Kwakwari; Swai
Balanga	Wala-waja	761125	Adarawa; Kabalu; Lajangara; Lawunungu; Sabon Layi
Billiri	Billiri-tangale	771101	Ayabu; Banganje; Bare; Billiri; Kalmai; Kulkul; Laberpit; Lakalkal; Lamugu; Landongor; Lanshi Daji; Pade Kungu; Pandikarmo; Pandiukude; Pokuli; Pokwangli; Popandi; Sabon Layi; Sansani; Shela; Sikirit; Tal; Tanglang; Todi; Tudu; Tudu Kwaya
Dukku	Dukku	760104	Baci Bano; Bagadaza; Bayo; Bele; Bozonshulwa; Buro Bunga; Dashi - Dukku; Dile; Gado; Galumji; Gusho; Jardade; Jarkum; Jombo; jonde; Juko; Liman; Mari; Nappe; Tinda; Tumpure; Zange
Dukku	Gombe Abba	760105	Bawa; Belikaje; Bomala; Daminya; Dawiya; Du; Jangira; Kokkobe; Kuni; Walowa; Wuro Bali; Wuro Tara; Yaufa; Zego/Kunde
Dukku	Hashidu	760106	Babagana; Bulturi; Dirongo; Dokoro; Duggiri; Gaji-Gala G/Abba; Gaye; Gode; Guza; Jamari; Kaigamari; Kaloma; Koboje; Kukan Zaure; Lafiya; Maltewo; Timbu; Wuro Tale; Yole
Funakaye	Ashaka	762102	Ashaka; B/ Falani; Badadi; Bage; Bulturi; Gulwari; Lambo Dashi; W.Nai; Yayaru; Zadawa
Funakaye	Bajoga	762101	Abuku; Baba Zur; Bodori; Bulabirim; Busum; Damawake; Damishi; Dingaya; Gadakka; Galgaldu; Ganjiro; Gassol; Gerengi; Jajiri; Koni; Marganani; Munda; Ribadu; Saleri; Tilde; Tongo; Wawa; Wurojabbe
Gombe	Gombe	760101	Doma; Gabukku; Inna; Manawashi; Pantami
Gombe	Gombe (Rural)	760101	Arawa
Kaltungo	Awak	770113	Bagaruwa; Bwara; Daura; Dodonruwa; Dundaye; Garin Bako; Garin Barau; Garin Ilyasu; Garin Jauro Gambo; Garin Korau; Garin Nasara; Garkin Alhaji Mani; Jauro Gotel; Kausur; Kunge; Kuren; Kwabilake; Lankare; Lugayidi; Momidi; Sabon Layi Awak; Salifawa; Shelin Kuwe; Soblong; Tambirame; Tanga; Tore; Tudu; Unguwan Barebare; Yari
Kaltungo	B/kaltin	770117	Bala Musa; Bankuwe; Bayutse; Bekundi; Bekune; Belari; Betese; Bewoda; Beyame; Bilakwate; Birnir Bako; Bukur; Bundubunde; Bwanbur; Garin J/Ali; Garin Jauro Bawo; Garin Jauro Jibril; Hamai; Jwabg; Kaltin; Kul; Kurin/D/Ruwa; Kwale; Kwatir; Lamuba; Nahuta; Sabon Gari; Swakal; Tabile; Takubin; Talon; Wir; Yabde; Yasale
Kaltungo	Baule	770114	Babali; Befingre; Befute; Betikwanti; Biladira; Bilafune; Bilakwale; Bilatuke; Bilkitaman; Bilkitaman Hayi; Busam; Bwatai; Chahe; Dalahe; Dilankiring; Garin Gamji; Garin Kalari; Garin Waziri; Gindindoruwa; Gwaibi; Ilori; Jalingo-Unguwar Tudun Wada; Jauro Audi; Jauro Hamidu; Jauro Mairana; Jongori Tudu; Ku-Trakwa; Kunini; Kursale; Kutuse; Kwalam; Lafiya; Lagurma; Lalunguri; Loture; Lungure; Mamman-sale; Nasarawa; Nekuntin; Silawang; Sweli; Tarabe; Telag; Tinalo-wabe; Tiye; Unguwar Bau; Unguwar Hausauwa; Unguwar Mission; Unguwar Mu`azu Boka; Urshauma; Yakwale
Kaltungo	Kaltungo East	770109	Am-Dur; Amtai; Aya; Bali Rah; Bandare; Chang-Chan; Domgom; Ka-awe; Kalakorok; Kalaku; Kalapandi; Kalarin; Kalaring; Kaleh; Kaleroh; Kalgomo; Kaluwa; Kanagunji; Kangubo; Kije village; Kokde; Korom; Kuleng-Gule; Lakwakwas; Lakweme; Laliklig; Lambirbir; Lapandimtai; Latur; Lawishi; Layiro Popandi; Layiro Poshereng; Lokolgol; Molding; Okkabore; Okkalaude; Okkije; Okkolong; Okrah; Okshili; Pandong; Podi; Pokekkerer; Poladong; Polatwali; Pondong; Popandi; Poshereng; Posia; Potena; Purmai; Shule; Tudun Alkali
Kaltungo	Kaltungo West	770101	Banganje; Kajau; Kalakanjang; Kalatede; Kaldok; Kalei; Kalgomo; Kalorgu; Kanguli; Kasar-Waje; Kwa; Ladibin; Ladwale; Lakoling; Lakuji; Lambu; Lapandintei; Latengul; Nasarawa; Okare; Okbanganje; Okdembe; Okdwale; Okrah; Okshenda; Piyangai; Pokanjang; Pokekerek; Poshongondong; Termana; Tuldibit; Tulgada; Tulumgaka; Tulumgunji
Kaltungo	Kamo	770111	Aoldo Bayo; Ardo Doya; Baba N`ere; Babewa; Baka Nyaker; Bakli; Bayan Kori; Bekitang; Beyan; Birwai; Biti-Biti; Buwosow; Dabewa; Dwale; G. Sarkin Yayi; Garin Alh. Sani; Garin Modibbo; Garin Nagge; Garin Sarkin Yaki; Garin Zauro Garba; Gindin Kuka; Gujuba; Hadarawa; J. Yahaya; Jauro Adamu; Jauro Baibo; Jauro Gale; Jauro Gidado; Jauro Sheni; Jauro Tambai; Jauro Yahaya; Jauro Yayi; Jauro-Bose; Jonga; Kalakorok; Kalikorko; Kam Sliee; Kamsila; Karsila; Kattar; Kelembeke; Kivege; Kobdong; Kuntulunge; Kur kure; Kurshumbur; Kwadda; Kwara; Labangle; Lafiya; Lah-Taramfadde; Laha; Latoddo; Lattarin; Matun Suyu; Mosso; Nakange; Nyibir; Nyila Cheng; Nyine-Diyer; Nyiti; Nyne Miuare; Nyne Tara; Patuinana; Pokwakka; Shenge Shenge Bolkidiwo; Sher shere; Shunge Shenge; Shwa; Tari Yau; Teni; Tudun Ucada Singe; Tudun Wada; Unguwan Kolo; Yalnine; Yannakata; Zalingo; Zange
Kaltungo	Tungo	770112	Anguwan Alfinti; Aya; Kala, Pandi; Kaleh; Kalgomo; Kallang; Kampandi; Kashing; Kila`kwata; Kolwa; Kukwas; Kwa; Labanlang; Ladur; Lakai; Lakaraklak; Lakidir; Lambare; Lawish Karago; Lawonglong; Limde; Opok`argo; Pokwangli II; Polagwang; Polakada; Polashuya; Pommgwallam; Potara; Sakawri; Willi; Yarwagana
Kaltungo	Ture	770110	Akbalam; Amden; Bethbere; Boto; Campi; Donka; Dwane; Kalakorok; Kalara; Kalwa; Kamlueu; Kuluneule; Kwane; Kwari; Labau; Labwilinblin; Ladur; Lakana; Lakazur; Lakdak; Lakweme; Lalme; Lamfirpir; Lamlam; Lare; Lkolin; Lue eaidi; Mararaba or Bwinbin; Okkallo; Okmana; Pakk; Panda; Pandi; Panpidok; Panrandan; Pantun; Pidrim; Pii; Pipandi; Pobauli; Pokada; Pokandaneran; Pongwalam; Poshuuge; Potipo; Potuzi; Shivi; Stock; Tabaraki; Tabwa; Tadwan; Takalala; Takara; Takubtizo; Takuvo; Takwaglik; Talmana; Tam; Tambado; Tapanmana; Taparam; Tapele; Tawalwale; Taware; Tawishi; Tawolom; Tawulank; Tayuyu; Tere; Tikdi; Tizo; Tulkwalak; Tulndindine; Ture Balam; Ture Kwe; Ture Mai; Ture Okialdi; Ture Okra; Wishi; Wolom
Kaltungo	Wange	770115	Babushe; Bakum; Balankiyan; Befili; Behamme; Bekuhe; Bekuntin; Bekwa; Bekwa Lume; Bela; Belantilante; Belodauda; Biayili; Bila; Bilanuke; Bilasuwe; Billakure; Bogara; Bujam; Buladabu; Bulange; Bule; Bwabwiyan; Bwakan; Bwayam; Bweku`u; Bwikwam; Bwitibwi; Chicnci; Dindibdn; Diyar; Falan; Fantami; Furku; Gadantaba; Gine; Kaltahe; Kalwa; Kan; Kukulbain; Kulasune; Kunini; Kuntilahe; Kusulle; Kusum; Kutube; Kutwale; Kwalka; Kwankwabe; Kwanshele; Lakele; Lakwama; Lefune; Lobwi; Lokakale; Lokulani; Loobashe; Loofe; Lookanhe; Lookeh; Luu; Maraban Tula; Sabonfegi; Store; Sumbakasi; Surkwam; Swanheh; Swattu; Tal; Tantan; Titang; Tobiri/GGSS; Twiyi; Unguwa Misslon; Unguwan Halilu; Unguwan Ma`aikata; Unguwan Manaja; Wurakukule; Yaku; Yori
Kaltungo	Yiri	770116	Bako Maikudi; Baleri; Bang; Beduwanghi; Bekum; Biladidabu; Buladi; Bwame; Bwate; Dadiye; Dandaso Bambam; Fitalang; Galadima Yiri; Haske; Kalaku; Kwai; Kwarsu; Kwen; Labwi; Lakkli; Lobashu; Lobwari; Lokukwa; Lokwajum; Maikarfi; Millin; Sabon Layiwarfum; Shel; Shilang; Swameh; Tasha; Tinbum; Tudum Wada; Ung` Kumdali; Ung`Galadima Bako; Wakili; Warfum
Kwami	Kwami	760102	Banishuwa; Bojude; Bomala; Bula; Bunu; Dawo; Diango; Gabuku; Gadam; Gamadadi; H. Dinawa; Habuja; Jabla; Jore; Kalajanga; Komfulata; Kwami; Roddo; Sabon Gari; Shongo; Tappi; Zangoma Gaji
Kwami	Malam Sidi	760103	Alagarno; Daban Fulani; Doho; Dukku; Gafara Madaki; Galadima Kadiri; Gamji; Guiwa; jambalu; Jammari; Jerkwami; Jokkire; Jurara; Kalagari; Kolori; Kufayi; Maiko; Malam Sidi; Maleri; Malko; Shani Fulani; Shani Tera; Tita; Wuro Abba; Yame; Zangoma Kyari
Nafada	Nafada	762103	Borwo; Danya; Diga; Doho; Dondole Lewe; Gadum; Garin Bulomo; Gube; Jigawa; Jolle; Kiyayo; Kuka; Lafiyawo; Langa; Mada; Maru; Papa; Shole; Shonganawo; Suka; Tondi; Wokollu; Zindir
Shongom	Bangunji	770106	Bango; Bangunji; Bikutture; Bikwala; Bishiwai; Dilange (Dutse); Kalo; Kulan; Laluwa; Najeji; Suli; Yelchen-Yelchen
Shongom	Burak	770104	Burak; Dabuki; Dajanwani; Kwanankukah; Lasanjang; Pirim; Sabonlayi; Shemyam; Tauni; Tiddi
Shongom	Filiya	770103	Chengun; Disga; Farin-Kasa; Filiya; Jauro-Sajo; Lababali; Yapandi; Yarana
Shongom	Gundale	770105	Anguwar Jauro Sule; Bebulo; Gundale; Gurwa; Kambuluk; Marke; Sakram; Swaja; Tudun Wada; Yelwa Gurwa
Shongom	Gwandum	770108	Danjigiri; Garko; Golombi; Gujuba; Gwandum; Gwanlammeche; Gwere Yelwa; Katagum; Keffi; Kukah; Lalingling; Majidadi; Pamadu; Pilame; Popandi; Sabongari; Tambau; Toro; Yabayo; Yafuto
Shongom	Kushi	770107	Dankunni; Dirang; Gomle; Kaure; Kommo; Kugwayam; Kushi; Ladongor; Lapandintai; Sabongari; Tanjania; Tatadar
Shongom	Shongom	770102	Amkolom; Boh; Kalishen; Karel; Kulishin; Labarya; Labayo; Labeke; Laduka; Lakenturum; Lakumji; Lalaipido; Lapan (Lapan); Lasadar; Lasanjang; Lasasap; Lashikoldok; Latatar; Latur; Lawishi; Layasakalak; Pokata; Tedmugzu
Yamaltu/Deba	Deba	761101	Baltongo; Baure; Boltongoyel; Dangar; Dumbu; Jannawo; Kakkau; Kanawa; Kunnuwal; Kuri; Lambam; Lano; Nasarawo; Nono; Nono M. Isa; Poli; Saruje; W. Birdeka; Wajari Jodoma; Wudil; Yelwa Kuri; Zagaina; Zamfarawa
Yamaltu/Deba	Jara	761107	Dahirma; Dasa; Nahuta; Garin Nabawa; Jagali; Jarawa; Jauro Gotel; Jigawa; Kadi; Kurjale; Maikaho; Pata; Tashar Kuka; Tsandom Dele; Tudun Wada
Yamaltu/Deba	Yamaltu	761102	Beguwa; Dakum; Difa; Gadawo; Garin Kudi; Gwani; Hinna; Kalo; Kulau; Kunji Kwadon; Kurba; Kwadon; Kwali; Laleko; Liji; Lubo; Ruwa Biri; Ruwan Biri; Sabon Gari bk; Shinga; Shuwari; Tsando; Wade; Zambuk; Dadinkowa,

== By Electoral Ward ==
Below is a list of polling units, including villages and schools, organised by electoral ward.

LGA	Ward	Polling Unit Name
Akko	Akko	Lafiya, Kofar Jauro; Marori / Wui-Wui, Kofar Jauro; Akko, Akko Pri. Sch.; S/Yaki/J. Hamma, Akko Pri. Sch.; Gamadadi T/Wada, Kofar Jauro; Lawanti, K. J. Lawanti; Jalingo, Kofar Jauro; Kombani, Kofar Jauro; Dunamari - Boggagel, Lawanti Pri. Sch.; Jalingo / Akko, K. S. Lawanti; Dolli Jilim - Dolli Kuture, Dolli Pri. Sch.; Don Doriya - Dolli Ngalda, Dolli Pri. Sch.; Katam - Guru - Modowa, Kofar Jauro; Wuro Dole - Munda, Wuro Dole Pri. Sch.; Lawo Doddo - Feshare, Kofar Jauro; Bula Kyari, Kofar S. Bula; Lamido Bagaji, Bula Pri. Sch.; Jan Gerawo - G. J. Shehu, K. J. Shehu; Gudde Saki, Kofar Jauro; Yolde Jani / Kuyuntu, Jamji Kofar Jauro; Jamji, J. Jamji; Bula - Bula, Kofar J.; Tudu Wada - K/Jauro Uban-Doma; Zongo Mari, K. S. Zongo Mari; Dagarawo - Marke, Dagarawo Pri. Sch.; Jauro Hamma, K. J. Jungudo; Malam Burari, K. J. Burari; Wuro Bogga, Akko Maternity; Zongomari, Side Of Zongomari Pri. Sch.; Jalingo, Dispensary; Zukkutu, K. J. Zukkutu
Akko	Garko	Yankari, Kofar S. Yaki; Domdomti / Yankari, Kofar Jauro; Yankari Arewa /Y. Yamma, K. J. Dajji; Kombani Baba, K. J. Bula; Kombani Isa / Ngaji, K. J. Kombani; Padaya Ardo /Padaya G., Kofar Jauro Padaya; Tabra I, Kofar S. Yaki; Tabra II, Kofar S. Yaki; Tabra Gobona, Kofar S. Gobona; Kalajanga, Kofar J. Kalajanga; Malam Izzu, Kofar Jauro; Ardo Boyi, Kofar Jauro; Galdi Mari, Kofar Jauro; Wuro Bokki, Kofar Jauro I; Wuro Bokki, Kofar Jauro II; B. C. G. A. / Bogo I, Kofar Jauro; B. C. G. A. / Bogo II, Kofar Bashar; B. C. G. A. / Bogo III, Kofar Bashar; B. C. G. A. / Bogo IV, Kofar Bashar; B. C. G. A. Bogo V, K. Mai Ung. Ummar; B. C. G. A. Bogo VI, K. Mai Ung. Ummar; B. C. G. A. Bogo VII, K. J. Gidim; B. C. G. A. Bogo VIII, K. Adamu Waziri; Jauro Bakari, K. J. Bakari; Shongo J. Bakari, Kofar Jauro; Shongo Hamma, S. Hamma Pri Sch.; Shongo Idirisa, S. Idirisa Pri. Sch.; Tumpure, K. J. Tumpure; Wuro Biriji, Wuro Biriji Pri. Sch.; J. Bose/Jada, Kofar Jauro Jada; Mazadu, Kofar J. Mazadu; Wuro Juli, Kofar Jauro; Wuro Malum, Kofar J. Malum; M. Yaya / W. Shile, Kofar Jauro; M. Usman / Hamman Dogo, Kofar Jauro; Bomala / Bappa Sira, Kofar Jauro Bomala; Hammdu Kafi / Masina, Kofar J. Hamma; Garko / Majidadi, Garko Pri. Sch.; Maji Dadi / Damba / Hamma, K. J. Damda; Sis Bako, Kofar Jauro; Hamma Golo, Kofar Jauro Hamma; Wudil /Wuro Dindi, Kofar Jauro; Maji Dadi / Kudema, Kofar Jauro; Gona Meltara, Gona Pri. Sch.; Kundulum / Madaki, Kofar J. Galadima; Beto, Kofar Jauro; Zagaina, Kondulum Pri. Sch.; Girgam, Kofar Jauro; Kundulum, Kundulum Pri. Sch.; Garin Shehu Wuro Biriji, Kofar Jauro Shehu; Barunde, Kofar Mai Anguwa Barunde; Garko, Dispensary
Akko	Kalshingi	Tudun Wada, Kalshingi Pri. Sch.; Pukuma, Kalshingi Pri. Sch.; Batari, Kofar Sarki; Kulum / Wuro Wakili, Kofar Jauro; Yolo Liman, Kofar Jauro; Wuro Sherif, Kofar Jauro; Abbas / H / Buzu, Kofar Jauro; Batari / G / Tugga, Kofar Jauro; Wuro Wakili / Baku, Kofar Jauro; Shilo Waziri, Shilo Pri. Sch.; Shilo Mamuda, Kofar Jauro; Abba Kalu / Abba Kayel, Kofar J. Ibrahim; Laro Tum Aure, K. Jauro Ibrahim; Shilo J. Ibrahim, Kofar Abare; Shilo Abore, Kofar Jauro; Lariye J. Audi, Kofar Jauro Audi; Pukura / Baroroji, Kofar Jauro; Taudoma / Alhaji, Kofar Jauro; Shilo M. Umaru, Kofar Jauro; Baguwa / Abbas, Kofar Jauro; Gujuba, Gujuba Pri. Sch.; Nayinawa Koroji, Kofar Jauro; Barri/Galo, Kofar Jauro; Iyabu/Pare, Near Pare Pri. Sch.; Pare / Kalbaya / Buba, Kofar Jauro; W/Golo Kagana, Temporary Shade/G. Jabba; Wudil/W. Dole, Kofar Jauro; Gabukka/Jamtari, Kofar Jauro; Dagaran Kero, Kofar Jauro; Sarki Shanu, Kofar Jauro; Pandaya/Madaki/P. Boyi, Kofar Jauro; Pandaya Hajina/Pandaya Tukuma, Kofar Jauro; Zoro/Tukulmayel J., Kofar Jauro; Kumu Waja, Kofar Jauro Dauda
Akko	Kashere	Kashere Gabas, K. Tafida; Kanon Kashere, Pri. Sch.; Kanon Kashere, Manun Hayi; Jama'Are, Kofar Jauro; Jama'Are, Kofar Waziri; Tumburu Yuduga, Kofar Jauro; Kai Gamari, Pri. Sch.; Layari, Kofar Jauro; Kafin Sulei, Kofar Jauro; Gamadadi, Kofar Jauro; Gwaram, Primary School; Kaya, Kofar Jauro; Panguru, Primary School; Dongol Chadi, Primary School; Dongol Alewa, Kofar Jauro; Wada Jauro Goje, Kofar Jauro; Jimpiti Gajere, Kofar Jauro; Rai Alhaji, Kofar Jauro; Manaru, Manaru Primary School; Guda Lamido, Kofar Jauro; Kesu J./Lamido, Kofar Jauro; Farin Bongo, Farin Bongo Pri. Sch.; Kaltanga Fulani, Kofar Jauro; Kaltanga Bakano, Kofar Jauro; Yalwa Fada, Primary School; Badari Yidi Kawu, Primary School; Tungo Manaru, Kofar Jauro; Ardo Sulei, Kofar Jauro; Barri, Kofar Jauro; Wuro Jaji, Kofar Jauro; Kufa, Kofar Jauro; Kesu Ardo, Kofar Jauro; Sakarambu, Primary School; Kesufattude, Kofar Jauro; Yelwa, Kofar Sarki; T. Wada, Kofar Jauro; Sambori G. Madu, Jauro Baba Sule; Wudil, Kofar J. Wudil
Akko	Kumo Central	Kumo S. Yaki, K. S. Yaki; Kumo Galadima, Lib. View Centre; Kumo Sardauna, Dos Office; Kumo B-Kasuwa, Kofar S. Yaki; Kumo S/Yaki, Kumo Martenity; Kumo Sardauna, Kumo Sardauna; Kumo Fuloti, Kofar Danfulani; Kumo Fuloti, Gofar Dankomishi; Kumo Bakoshi, Central Pri. Sch.; Kumo Fuloti, Kofar Adamu; Kumo Fulot, Kofar Liman Shuibu; Kumo Fulani, Jauro Tukur Pri. Sch.; Nayinawa, Kofar J. Dauda; Kumo Fulani East, K. J. Magaji; Chiroma Dawa, K. Chiroma Dawa; Gaudare, Shabbal Pri. Sch.; Dakkiti, Kofar Jauro; Lamba J. Musa, Kofar Jauro; Lergo, Legro Pri. Sch.; Lambo J. A. Bose, Kofar Jauro; Kombaniyel, Kofar Jauro; Ngaudare, Kofar Jauro; Garin M. Ba, Garin M. Ba Pri. Sch.; Wuro Bappa, Jauro Bappa
Akko	Kumo East	Buba Waziri, Kofar Mai Ang. Seyoji; Kumo Tera, Kofar Jauro Ummaru; Akkoyel I, Akkoyel Pri. Sch.; Akkoyel II, Akkoyel Pri. Sch.; Bangu Bantashi, Kofar Manu Bangu; Garkoyel, Kofar Jauro; Garaza, Nomadic Education Primary School; Wuro Giye, Kofar Jauro; Buba Waziri, Kofar Jauro; Kumo Shadori, Kofar Marafa; Kunji J. Lawan, Kofar Jauro I; Kunbi J. Lawan, Kofar Jauro II; Zange A. Baba, Kofar Jauro; Kembu Waziri, A. Waziri Pri. Sch.; Kembu Ung. Waziri, Kofar Sarki; Garin Lawal, Kofar J. Lawal; Kembu A. Didiel, Kofar Amadu Didiel; Kembu Zelani, Kofar Jauro Zelani; Kembu Madaki, Kembu Farm Srv. Cnt.; Bello Tine, Kofar Bello Tine; Kembu Audug, Kembu Vet. Clinic; Garkin Lawal, Kofar Jauro; Bula Bajja, Kofar Jauro; Malam Bakari, K. J. G. Bakari; Jauri Kudiri, K. J. Kudiri; Malam Manu, G. Madaki Primary School; Jauro Lamela, K. J. Lamela; Jauro Gale, Jauro G. Pri. Sch.; Lembiyel, Lembiyel Pri. Sch.; Ardo Kadiri, K. J. Ardo; Hamma Bani, K. Hamma Bani; Yerima Shehu, K. J. Yerima Shehu; Garin S. Noma, Kofar Jauro; Kidda I, Kidda Pri. Sch.; Kidda II, Kidda Pri. Sch.; Kumboyel, Kofar Jauro; Bula, Kofar Jauro; Panda I, Panda Pri. Sch.; Panda II, Panda / Pri. Sch.; Sabon Gari, Kofar Jauro; Late I, Late Pri. Sch.; Late II, Late Pri. Sch.; Boltongo, Kofar J. Moh'D; Danyawa I, K. Jauro Ibrahim; Danawa II, K. Jauro Ibrahim; Wanzamai, Kofar Jauro; Jigawa G. Alh., Kofar Jauro Alhaji; Jigawa G. Alh., K. Jauro Isa Tutoti; Buba Waziri, Teburin M. Habu
Akko	Kumo North	Lembi, Lembi Pri. Sch.; Lembe Weddare, Kofar Jauro; Gamawa, Kofar Jauro; Nahuta W/Yaya, Kofar Jauro; Yelwa Mararraba, K. Jauro; Wuro Sale Lembi, K. Jauro; Wuro Yaya, K. Jauro; Barambu I, Barambu Pri. Sch.; Barambu II, Barambu Pri. Sch.; Garin Garba, K. Jauro; Wuro Baka, K. Jauro; Maidugu, Maidugu Pri. Sch.; Tongo Sambo, Kofar Jauro; Koroti, Kofar Jauro; Hamma Shanu, Kofar Jauro; Londo, Kofar Jauro
Akko	Kumo West	Tashar Magariya, K. Galadima A.; Ung. Jauro Bose, K. J. Bose; Jauroji, Jauroji Pri. Sch.; Garin Alkali, Kofar Jauro; Jauro Boltongo, K. Mai Ung.; Kumo Sarkin Tangale, Central Pri. Sch.; Kumo J/ Mija, K. Jauro Usman; Kumo Bamrur, K. T. Tsohon Tasha; Kumo Bamrur, Kofar Magaji; Tambe, Junior Sec. Sch.; Kumo Bambur / Kumo Tanko; Lawo Malum, Kumo West; Wurojada, Govt. Tech. College Kumo; Kobuwa Fulani, Kofar Jauro; Kayel Baga, Kayel B. Pri. Sch.; Tudun Kuka, Kofar Jauro; Zange Bello, Adult Education Office; Zange Bello, Kofar Jauro; Lugge Rewo, Kofar Jauro; Sabon Garin Bappa, Bappa I. Pri. Sch.; Kobuwan Nadiya, Kofar Jauro; Jauro Malam, Kofar Jauro Malam; Taliyaje, Kofar Jauro; Baka Hashimu, K. J. Hashimu; Lafiya, K. S. Gadawo; Gadawo, Gadawo Pri. Sch.; Ardo Jobbo, Kofar J. Jobbo; Barri, Near J. Jobbo; Barri G. Baraya, Near Barri Pri. Sch.; Wuro Yola, Wuro Yola Pri. Sch.
Akko	Pindiga	Ubandoma, Pindiga District Office; Dan Buram, Kofar Dan Buram; Makama, Pindiga Pri. Sch.; Sumbe, Kofar Jauro; Nasarawo, Kofar Jauro; Sarkin Yaki, K. Sarki Yaki; Galanwo, Kofar Jauro; Abbayo, Dev. Area Office; Galadima, Maternity Clinic; Baka, K. Mai Ung.; W/Bogga, G. Alkali Pri. Sch.; Gujubawo, Kofar Jauro; Jauro Wal, Kofar Jauro; Shaiska, Kofar Jauro; W. Bundu Hamza, W. Bundu Pri. Sch.; Lafiyo, Kofar Jauro; Wurobundu Baba, Kofar Jauro; Bagadaza, Kofar Jauro; Kombani S/Arewa, K. S/Kombani; Jalingo Kombani, Kofar Jauro; Birniwa, Kofar Jauro; Kaltanga S/Gari, Kofar Sarki; Dumbe, Kofar Jauro; Kolmani Musari, Kofar Jauro; Kulum Kaltanga, Kofar Jauro; Tai Kaltanga, Kofar Jauro; Solok, K. Jauro Solok
Akko	Tumu	Zabin Kani, Kofar Jauro; Warra, Kofar Jauro; Kalmai West, Piyau Pri. Sch.; Mai Shanu, Piyau Pri. Sch.; Mai Ganga, Mai Ganga Pri. Sch.; Gulmari, Kilawa Pri. Sch.; Wuro Poli, Wuro Poli Pri. Sch.; Tumu Yamma, Vet. Clinic; Tumu Arewa, Pri. Sch.; Tumu Gabas, Kofar Sarki; Kombani Yaya, Kombani Pri. Sch.; Bada Waire, Kofar Jauro; Tulmi Ala Gabi, Tulmi Pri. Sch.; Gaudare Feshare, Feshare Pri. Sch.; Sabon G/Tijjani, Pry. Sch.; Sabon G/Bose, Kofar Bose; Jabba Sambodaji, Jabba Pri. Sch.; Tumu Central, Bakin Kasuwa
Akko	Tukulma	Gokaru, K. J. Dan Buram; Tukulma Magaji, Tukulma Pri. Sch.; Gamawa, Gamawa Pri. Sch.; Tukulma Yerima, K. S/Tukulma; Papa Mango, K. A. Amadu; Nagaudare, Kofar J. Babayo; Jurara, Kofar J. Mallam Bappa; Auwaru, Kofar Jauro Boyi; Dakkiti I, Kofar J. Sintali; Dakkiti II, Kofar J. Sintali; S/Gari Galadima, Kofar Galadima; W/Hausa Mijinyawa, K. Wuro Hausa; W/Hausa, K. Wuro Hausa; Taliyana, Kofar Jauro; Wadai, Kofar Jauro; Wuro Derto I, Kofar Jauro; Wuro-Derto II, Kofar Jauro; G. Adamu Magaji, Kofar Jauro
Balanga	Bambam	Bakin Kasuwa, Kofar Mai Ung.; Ung. Faruk, Dispensary; Taliyayi, Court House; Bajoga Gadamayo, Kofar Adamu; Godobe Yulo, Post Office; Bajoga Nasarawo, Bambam Pri. Sch.; Yarabawa/Galadima, K. Sarki; Kakur, Gidan Gona; Gadamayo, Gadamayo Pry. Sch.; Gadamayo, Gadamayo K. J.; Jauro Tukur, K. Jauro Tukur; Gangare, K. Mai Ung. Usman
Balanga	Bangu	Goruruwa, Bangu Pri. Sch.; Goruruwa, Kofar Sarki; Zongo Yari, Dispensary; Laura Daurawa, K. Jauro Sallau; Yobuyo, K. Ali G.; B/Gonamba, Bangu Pri. Sch.; Deluwa, Dala Waja Pri. Sch.; Nadiya, Dala Waja Pri. Sch.; Gurkuma, K. Galadima; Dundukurwa, K. Mai Ang.; Lafiya Sarki, Lafiya Pri. Sch.; Tiyakunu, K. Mai Ung. Tiyakunu; Lafiya, Dispensary Lafiya; Lafiya, Lafiya Pri. Sch.
Balanga	Dadiya	Lokula Sanga, Dadiya K. Mai Ung.; Latakulan, Dadiya Pri. Sch.; Maitunku, Maitunku; Yamfiyo, K. Bawa; Gindin Dorowa, Kofar Dawa; Lodedi, Dadiya; Lokwila, Yelwa; Logolwa, Maternity; Lobati, K. Mai Kalo; Lokula Kuli, Dadiya Pri. Sch.; Lokula Kuli, Dadiya Pri. Sch.; Lobware, Dispensary; Dalipila, Maternity; Lobware, K. Mai Ung.; Lofiyo, K. Mai Ung; Loluba, K. Mai Ung; Begilan, Kofar Ayuba; Sabara, Sabon Pri. Sch.; Loyolme, K. Mai Ung.
Balanga	Gelengu / Balanga	Bakasi North I, Bakasi Pri. Sch.; Bakasi North II, Bakasi Pri. Sch.; Bakasi South I, Bakasi Pri. Sch.; Bakasi South II, Bakasi Pri. Sch.; Balan Sane I, Kofar Mai Ung.; Balan Sane II, Kofar Mai Ung.; Garin Kuka, Kofar Jauro; Kembu Matinja, Kembu Pri. Sch.; Kembu, Kembu Pri. Sch.; Garu East I, Gelengu Pri. Sch.; Garu East II, Gelengu Pri. Sch.; Garu West, Maternity; Gumsa, Gumsa Pri. Sch.; Takasa I, J. S. S. Gelengu; Takasa II, J. S. S. Gelengu; Jurara Jula, Jule Gelengu; Jurare, Maternity; Garu I, Kofar Kalau; Garu II, Kofar Kalau; Balanga South, Balanga Pri. Sch.; Balanga North, Balanga Pri. Sch.; Ganga Ware, Kofar Mai Ung.; Jongwam Gwam, Kofar Adari
Balanga	Kindiyo	Kulo I, Cham Pri. Sch.; Kulo II, Cham Pri. Sch.; Kwasi I, Kwasi Pri. Sch.; Kwasi II, Kwasi Pri. Sch.; Yadi, Yadi Pri. Sch.; Ung. Hausawa, Old Dispensary; Ung. Hausawa, Motor Park; Ung. Hausawa, Kofar Hassan; Dakawal/Yimang, Kofar Jauro; Lakun, Lakun Pri. Sch; Buwangal/Gulanti, Kofar Mai Ung.; Yolde, Yolde Pri. Sch.; Tiksir, Tiksir Pri. Sch.; Kumtur, Kumtur Pri. Sch.; Kulo, Kofar Mai Ung.
Balanga	Kulani / Degre /Sikkam	Jono Buta I, Kulani Pri. Sch.; Jono Buta II, Kulani Pri. Sch.; Chessi Chamciyo I, Chessi Pri. Sch.; Chessi Chamciyo II, Chessi Pri. Sch.; Kwande Tikire, Yang Pri. Sch.; Gurma I, Gurma Pri. Sch.; Gurma II, Gurma Pri. Sch.; Gubili, Kore Pri. Sch.; Kalami Dio, Kofar Misah; Tihu, Kofar Mai Kalande; Kwande, Kofar Kakinde; Laman Buta, Kofar Ma'Aji; Ching Chillage, Kofar J. S.; Ching, Ching Pri. Sch.; Fulani Kadi, Putoki Pri. Sch. I; Fulani Kadi, Putoki Pri. Sch. II; Luki, Kofar Jauro; Suri, K. Jauro Ali; Sikkam Jone, K. Bitrus; Sikkam Mayo, K. Kaulala; Kware Dadiyo, K. Mai Ung.; Taku Garu, K. Mai Ung. Dadiyo; Taku Garu Bwalu, K. Mai Ung. Taku; Taku Garuk/Sarki, K. Mai Ung. Sarki
Balanga	Mwona	Loyel, Loyel Pri. Sch. I; Loyel, Loyel Pri. Sch. II; Jublang I, Mwona Pri. Sch.; Jublang II, Mwona Pri. Sch.; Bare, Bare Pri. Sch.; Dungaje, Dangaje Pri. Sch.; Dungaje, K. Daukadi; Fitilai, Fitilai Pri. Sch.; Kutare, Kutare Pri. Sch.; Bular, Bula Pri. Sch.; Lakum, Lakum Pri. Sch.; Kwarge, Kwarge Pri. Sch. I; Kwarge, Kwarge Pri. Sch. II; Tashan Kwani, Kwani Tasha; Silon, Silon K. Mai Ung.; Fumur, K. Mai Ung. Toma
Balanga	Nyuwar / Jessu	Chunyi I, Nyuwar Pri. Sch.; Chunyi II, Nyuwar Pri. Sch.; Bwaza, K. Buba Dogo; Gilangitu, Gilangitu Pri. Sch.; Gulyimora, K. Dan Pri. Sch. I; Gulyimora, K. Dan Pri. Sch. II; Tsibo, K. Mai Ung.; Sabon Layi, Jessu Pri. Sch. I; Sabon Layi, Jessu Pri. Sch. II; D/Gulyimora, J. S. S. Jessu I; D/Gulyimora, J. S. S. Jessu II; Gabikishau I, Dispensary; Gabikishau II, Dispensary; Do'Ara I, K. Wando; Do'Ara II, K. Wando; Do'Ara III, K. Wando
Balanga	Swa / Ref / W. Waja	Bappara, Swa Pri. Sch.; Desheru, K. Mal. Abdu; Desheru, Swa Pri. Sch.; Wadaci, Dispensary; Wadaci I, Gidan Gona; Wadaci II, Gidan Gona; Wadaci, Kofar Yasa; Nadiya, Wala Waja Pri. Sch.; Bakwaina I, K. Mai Ung.; Bakwaina II, K. Mai Ung.; Kabalu, K. Mai Ung.; Lajangara, Lajangara Pri. Sch.; Juwa, Kofar Galadima; Refele, Dispensary; Ayaba, Kofar M. Sale; Kolmi, Project; Kolaku I, K. Jauro Kolaku; Kolaku II, K. Jauro Kolaku; Tudun Wada, K. Jauro T/Wada; Maidara, K. Alh. Isa; Jangai, Dispensary; Panglang, K. Mai Ung.; Magarya, Dispensary D/M
Balanga	Talasse / Dong / Reme	Wuro Dole I, Talasse Pri. Sch.; Wuro Dole II, Talasse Pri. Sch.; Wuro Dole, Upper Area Court; Duibashingi, K. Azumi Dan; Nasarawa, Project; Nasarawa, K. Batari; Nasarawa, K. Waziri; Nasarawa, K. Barkama; Jurara, Dispenary; Jurara, K. Abdullahi; Jongiri, K. Charles; Bakwera, Dong Pri. Sch.; Nadiya I, Dong Pri. Sch.; Nadiya II, Dong Pri. Sch.; Junge I, Junge Pri. Sch.; Junge Pri. Sch. Junge II; Guka, Reme Pri. Sch.; Kokali/Nadiyo, K. Mai Ung.; Gukurmi, K. Mai Ung.; Geng/Ga, K. Sallau Idi; Dogole/Jamjara, K. Kalla
Billiri	Baganje North	Laworkondo, Pri. Sch. Laworkondo; Lafurut, Kofar Jauro Lafurut; Popandi, Popandi Pri. Sch.; Lakukdu I, Kofar Jauro Lakukdu; Lakukdu II, Kofar Jauro; Sabon Layi, Sabon Kafor. Jauro; Lamugu, Lamugu Pri. Sch.; Kilapandi, Kofar Jauro Kilapandi; Lapan Shedde, K. Jauro L/Shedde; Popandi Lankaka, K. Jauro Peter Dani
Billiri	Baganje South	Kalkunji I, Kofar Jauro Kalkunji; Kalkunji II, Kofar Jauro Kalkunji; Polapandi, Kwaya, Polapandi Kwaya Pri. Sch.; Kanduro, Kofar Jauro Kanduro; Banganjenting, Kofar Sarki Banganje; Bore, Kofar Jauro Bore; Sesser, Kofar Jauro Sesser; Latu, Kofar Jauro Latu; Lawishi, Layafi, Kofar Jauro Lawishi I; Lawishi Layafi, Kofar Jauro Layafi II; Kengreng, Kofar Jauro Kengreng; Lakarai, Kofar Jauro Lakarai; Latur, K. Danladi Adamu
Billiri	Billiri North	Lakwalak, Kofar Jauro Lakwalak; Pokwangli/Belkamto, Dangwaram Pri. Sch.; Ladongor, Ladongor Pri. Sch.; Lasale I, Lasale Market; Lasale II, Lasale Market; Sansani, Sansani Pri. Sch.; Sasani, Kofar Jauro Toyi; Lawiltu, Kofar Jauro Lawiltu; Popandi, Kofar Jauro Popandi; Payi Tangale, Kofar Jauro Payi Tangale; Amutha Tangale I, Amutha Pri. Sch.; Amutha Tangale II, Amutha Pri. Sch.; Amutha Fulani, Kofar Jauro Fulani; Lakwakka, Kofar Jauro Lakwakka; Lareka, Kofar Jauro Lareka; Ung. Fulani, Kofar Jauro Ung. Fulani
Billiri	Billiri South	Maital Daju, District Office; Kufai/Yelwa, Kufai Pri. Sch.; Ung. Hausawa, Viewing Centre; Ladukansha, K. Jauro Ladukansha; Labwini, Central Pri. Sch.; Kandali, Kofar Jauro Kandali; Koltanga/Ung. Wurkun, Kofar Jauro Ibrahim; Tasha I, Kofar Sale Raph; Tasha II, Kofar Latumba; Pisi Uko, Pri. Sch. Lawishi Daji; Pakla, Pri. Sch.; Latoddo, Kofar Jauro Latoddo; Kwiba, Pri. Sch.; Kalindi, Pri. Sch.; Komta, K. Mai. Ung. Akawu; Pandi Kungu, K. Jauro Pandi Kungu; Kwilapandi, Pri. Sch.; Komta, K. J. Zakari Rambi
Billiri	Kalmai	Kalmai, K. Sarki; Kalmai, K. Polmo; Labatene/Powishi, Pri. Sch.; Amtawalam, Pri. Sch.; Pobawure, K. Jauro Pobawure; Kaltango, K. J. Kaltango; Wuro Ladde, K. Jauro Ladde; Lakelembu, K. Jauro Lakelembu
Billiri	Tal	Bekeri, K. Sarki; Bekeri, Kofar Jauro Daniel; Kolong, Kofar Jauro Kolong; Tal Duka, Kofar Jauro Tal Duka; Tal Pandi, Kofar Jauro Nitte; Dongor, Kofar Jauro Dongor; Popandi/Pokata, Kofar Jauro Pandi; Kiwulang, Pri. Sch.; Pandi Kame/T. Fulan, Kofar Jauro Kame; Kurum/Laberfito, Pri. Sch.; Kalbore, K. Jauro Kalbore; Buye, Pri. Sch. Tal; Pandin Kude, Kofar Jauro Pandin Kude; Tangale Ayaba, Ayaba Pri. Sch.; Hausawa Ayaba, K. Sarki Ayaba; Palsesse, Kofar Jauro Palsesse; Lawampe, Kofar Jauro Lawampe; Lasani/Lasuklo, Pri. Sch.; Kolok Kwannin, Kofar Jauro Kolok - Kwanin; Latugat, K. J. Latugat
Billiri	Tanglang	Kampandi Kwaya, K. Peace Atiku; Kampandi Kwaya, Kofar Sarki; Kalkulong, Pri. Sch. Kalkulong; Lawishi Tg I, K. Jauro Lawishi; Lawishi Tg II, J. Lawish; Poyali, K. Jauro Poyali; Lakalkal, K. Jauro Lakalkal; Kulgul I, Pri. Sch.; Kulgul II, Pri. Sch.; Bassa, Pri. Sch.
Billiri	Todi	Dongor I, Pri. Sch.; Dongor II, Pri. Sch.; Lakule, K. Jauro Latana; Latana, K. Jauro Latana; Yan Sari, K. Jauro Yan Sari; Shela I, Pri. Sch.; Shela II, Pri. Sch.; Layer, K. Jauro Layer; Lakollo, K. Jauro Lakollo; Wuro Doya, K. Jauro Wuro Doya
Billiri	Tudu Kwaya	Tudu Kwaya I, Pri. Sch. Kwaya; Tudu Kwaya II, Pri. Sch. Kwaya; Tudu Kwaya III, K. Sarki Tudu; Yolde, K. Jauro Yolde; Lawishi, K. Jauro Lawishi; Lakondo, Kofar Jauro Lakondo; Layona, Kofar Jauro Layona; Fulani Jilo, K. Jauro Fulani Jilo; Latana I, K. Jauro Latana; Latana II, K. Jauro Latana; Poshalo K. J Poshalo; Panguru, Bakin Tasha
Dukku	Gombe Abba	Hinna G/Abba, G/Abba Pri. Sch.; Hinna G/Abba, Kofar Ajiya G/Abba; Sarki Kogi, G/Abba Maternity; Bayan Dutsi, Kofar S. Ba/Dutsi; Pakkar, Kofar S. Pakkar; Girtiba, Kofar S. Girtiba; Gajigala, Gajigala Pri. Sch.; Yole/Wuro Wamba, Yole Pri. Sch.; Agana Dawaki, Kofar Dawaki; Agana Salimanu, Kofar Salimanu; Wuro Jada/Waloji, Waloji Pri. Sch.; Wuro Tara, Kofar S. W./Tara; Wuro Dama, Kofar S. Wuro Dama; Lule Dabe, Kofar S. L. Dabe; Lulemaji Sego, K. S. Sego; Lamba Gande, Sarki Gande; Lamba Iyaka, Sarki Iyaka; Gale, Gale Pri. Sch.; Gale, Gale Dispensary; Wuro Kom, Kofar S. Kom
Dukku	Hashidu	Madaki East, Hashidu Central Pri. Sch.; Madaki West, Hashidu Dispensary; Madaki West, Hashidu Maternity; Madaki Central, Kofar S. Hashidu; Wuro Bundu, Kofar S. Wuro Bundu; Jauro Jalo, Kofar Jauro Jalo; Jauro Yauta, Kofar Jauro Yauta; Wuro Nareje, Kofar S. Wuro Nareje
Dukku	Jamari	Ung. Sardauna, Jamari Pri. Sch.; Ung. Sardauna, Kofar Mai Ung. Sardauna; Ung. Madaki, Jamari Maternity; Kaloma, Kofar Sarki; Kafiyel, Kofar Sarki; Garin Bulama, Kofar Bukama; Bada Oshi, Kofar Sarki; Bame Lafiya, Kofar Sarki; Gagra Bami, Kofar Sarki; Mamini, Kofar Mamini; Dige, Dige Pri. Sch.; Gadum, Gadum Pri. Sch.; Wuro Dole, Kofar Sarki; Bolari Dugi, Kofar Bolari; Maru, Maru Pri. Sch.; Kamba, Kamba Pri. Sch.; Tafida Mai Rafi, Kofar Tafida; Maina Baba, Kofar Maina; Dugo, Kofar Sarki Dugo; Narabi, Kofar Sarki; Alh. Malle, Kofar Sarki; Katsira, Kofar Sarki; Dinchi Zeyawan, Kofar S. Dinchi; Chambalu, Kofar S. Chambalu; Dokoro, Dokoro Pri. Sch.; Tsangaya/Daya, Kofar Alaramma; Alagarno, Kofar Sarki; Farin Bongo, Kofar Sarki; Kukadi, Kofar Sarki; Babagana, Kofar Babagana; Jauro Musa, Kofar Jauro; Yelwa, Kofar Yelwa; Kaigamari, Kofar Sarki; Wuro Haire, Kofar Sarki; Lafiya Dokoro, Kofar Sarki
Dukku	Kunde	Chiroma, Kunde Pri. S Ch.; Jagaliwol, Kunde Maternity; Bawa, Bawa Pri. Sch.; Bawa, Kofar Mai Ung. Jibo; Zego, Zego Dispensary; Sebidu, Pri. Sch.; Sebidu, Kofar Dan Buram; Daminya, Dan Buram; Kokkobe, Kofar S. Kokkobe; Walowa Ardo, Kofar Ardo; Walowa Maude, Kofar Maude; Jangira, Jangira Pri. Sch.; Jangira, Kofar Sarki Gaskahe; Wuro Bali, Kofar S. Wuro Bali; Wuro Nyolde, Kofar Ardo
Dukku	Malala	Ung. Baba Hassan, Malala Area Court; Ung. Galadima, Malala Maternity; Ung. Bauchi, Malala Dispensary; Ung. Madaki, Malala Pri. Sch.; Auyakari, Kofar Mai Ung.; Chiroma Bakau, Kofar Chiroma; Kowagol, Primary School; Dokoroyel, Kofar Sarki; Ganawaji, Primary School; Jauro Abbu, Kofar Jauro; Jauro Goje, Kofar J. Goje; Wuro Bundu, Kofa Sarki; Birishe, Kofar Sarki; Waloji, Primary School; Gadum Bawa, Kofar Sarki; Lariski, Kofar Sarki; Burari, Primary School; Burari, Kofar Mai Ung.; Gadum Mala, Kofar Sarki; Duggiri, Primary School; Bakau Tambajam, Kofar Sarki; Tilde, Kofar Sarki; Dalari/Betori, Kofar Betori; Jauro Bako, Kofar Jauro
Dukku	Waziri North	Ung. Chiroma, District Office; Ung. Chiroma I, Central Pri. Sch.; Ung. Chiroma II, Central Pri. Sch.; Ung. Tudun Wada, Manga Pri. Sch.; Tudun Wada, Kofar Mai Ung.; Karel Daccu, Health Centre; Balu, Maternity Clinic; Balu, Dispensary Clinic; Lafiya, L. G. A. Secretariat; Lafiya, Veterinary Clinic; Guza, Kofar S. Guza; Ngamdu, Kofar S. Nagambu; Guli J. Bappa, Kofar Jauro Bappa; Guli Bappah, Guli Pri. Sch.; Jamtamida, Kofar Sarki; Ponga/Kazuba, Kofar Kazuba; Goringo, Kofar Sarki; Bagadaza, Kofar Sarki; Gode, Gode Pri. Sch.; Maiunguwa Gode, Kofar Mai Ung.; Guli Sabo, Kofar Sarki; Ngaldo, Kofar Sarki; Bada, Kofar Sarki; Jarkum, Pri. Sch.; Jauro Gidado, Kofar Sarki; Suka, Suka Pri. Sch.; Jauro Oshe, Kofar Sarki; Barra, Kofar Sarki; Jarkum, Kofar Sarki
Dukku	Waziri South / Central	Lafiya, Dukku West Pri. Sch.; Tilel, Kofar Sarki Tilel; Nayelwa, Kofar S. Nayelwa; Nayelwa, Kofar Buba Zassa; Nayelwa, Kofa S. Aska; Dugge, Kofar M. Dugge; Dugge, Magistrate Court; Dugge, Wakilin Dugge; Gona, Dukku Central Pri. Sch.; Gona, G. S. A. D. P.; Gona, Gona East Sch.; Shabewa, Shabewa Pri. Sch.; Nakuja, Kofar S. Nakuja; Wedu-Kole, Kofar Sarki; Wakalo, Kofar Sarki; Shalludi, Kofar Sarki; Dashi, Pri. Sch.; Dashi, Dispensary Clinic; Bulbul Tongoyel, Kofar S. Bulbul; Bulbul Tongoyel, Kofar S. Bulbul Lafiyawo; Wuro Amale, Kofar Sarki; Gabulu, Kofar Sarki; Yarra/Nakaya, Kofar Sarki Yarra; Gambe/Galumji, Kofar S. Gambe; Yarra Nakaya, Kofar Sarki Yara; Jonde, Kofar Sarki Jonde; Damba, Kofar Sarki Damba; Dile, Kofar S. Dile; Tarau, Kofar Sarki Tarau; Gombe Doggize, Kofar Sarki Gombe Doggize; Bozonshulwa, Kofar Sarki Bozonshulwa; Wakili Adamu, Kofar Sarki Wakili; Tinda, Kofar Sarki Tinda; Banigayi, Banigayi Pri. Sch.; Yado, Kofar Yado; Jardade, Kofar Sarki Jardade; Malalayel, Pri. Sch.; Shuwe, Pri. Sch.; Nappe, Kofar Sarki; Birni, Pri. Sch.
Dukku	Wuro Tale	Wuro Tale, Pri. Sch.; Numpaso Hashiduwo, Kofar S. Numpaso; Kalam Gaye, Kalam Pri. Sch.; Gadum/Fulatari/Falangaya, Kofar S. Gadum; Gabciyari Mabami, Kofar S. Gabciyari; Gudemunu, Pri. Sch.; Kole /Shabewawo, Kofar S. Kole; Alagarno/Chikauje, Kofar S. Chikauje; Gojongori, Kofar Sarki; Ngalto, Kofar Sarki; Tinbu/Badanbo, Kofar Bamai; Mayo Lamido, Pri. Sch.; Mayo Madaki, Pri. Sch.; Kabade, Pri. Sch.; Wuro Waziri Batoyi, Kofar Wuro Waziri; Wuro Bogga, Kofar Sarki
Dukku	Zange	Tumpure, Kofar Sarki; Wangi, Kofar Sarki; Zagala, Pri. Sch.; Jombo, Kofar Sarki; Seyum, Kofar Sarki; Damba Dabe, Kofar Sarki; Kuni, Pri. Sch.; Kobini Zange, Zangi Pri. Sch.; Kobin, Kofer S. Kobini; Balaje, Kofar Sarki Balaje; Damba Dukku, Kofar Sarki; Gusho, Kofar Sarki; Bagadaza, Kofar Sarki; Bani, Kofar Sarki; Jale, Kofar Sarki; Bomala, Kofar Sarki; Dabewo, Kofar Sarki; Wawa Zange, Kofar Jauro; Bokkiru, Pri. Sch.; Bokkiru, Kofar Sarki; Nasarawo Da'U, Kofar S. Nasarawo; Wuro Kudu, Kofar Sarki; Pavya Fulbe, Kofar Jauro; Koblo, Kofar S. Koblo
Dukku	Zaune	Tafida Zaune, Pri. Sch.; Santuraki, Dispensary; Bauchi/Madaki, Kofar Sarki; Jambalde, Kofar Sarki; Alaramma, Kofar Alaramma; Garin Atiku, Kofar Atiku; Dukkuyel, Kofar Sarki; Dukkuyel, K/Mai Ung. Santuraki; Malumri/Yelwa, Kofar Sarki
Funakaye	Ashaka / Magaba	Ung. Yerima Ashaka, Kofar Yerima; Ung. Chiroma, Kofar Chiroma; Ung. Malumri, Kofar Mai Ung.; Bula Gaidam, Kofar Sarki; Bula Gaidam, Pri. Sch.; Mannari, Kofar Jauro; Manawashi, Kofar Jauro; Jalingo, Pri. Sch.; Dayayi, Kofar J. Dayayi; Jalingo, Kofar Jauro; Jalingo, Kofar Waziri; Jalingo, Bakin Tasha; Workers Village, Primary School; Workers Village, Maintenance; Workers Village, Bakin Kasuwa; Jauro Bappah, Kofar Jauro; Magaba, Primary School; Mabani, Kofar Sarki; Jauro Kadiri, Kofar Jauro; Kademi, Kofar Jauro; Garin Alh. Bello, Kofar Jauro; Wuro Na'I, Kofar Jauro; Wuro Zarma, Kofar Jauro; Mutukel, Jauro Mutukel
Funakaye	Bage	Ung. Shamaki, Kofar Shamari; Ung. Shamaki, Pri. Sch.; Santuraki, Kofar Santuraki; Santuraki, Dispensary; Badabti, Kofar Sarki; Bulturi, Kofar Sarki; Feshingo J. Bose, Kofar Jauro Bose; Wuro Yayaru, Pri. Sch.; Fufajamna, Kofar Jauro; Wurodole, Kofar Jauro Boyi; Wuro Accama, Kofar Jauro Boyi; Manawashi, Kofar Jauro; Hamma Kolori, Kofar Jauro; Wuro Bapparu, Kofar Jauro; Malam Madu, Kofar Jauro; Gube, Kofar Jauro; Juggol Borkono, Primary School; Juggol Borkono, Kofar Sarki; Gongila, Kofar Sarki; Feshingo Yerima, Kofar Jauro; Kafiwol Ardo, Kofar Ardo; Kafiwol, Primary School; Koyaya, Kofar Jauro; Kerziki, Kofar Jauro; Ashaka Coastain, Estate Housing; Darumfa, Kofar Jauro; Bungum, Primary School; Dindi Jauro Damji, Kofar Jauro Damji; Ung. Katako, Ginbin Aduwa; Gardawashi, Kofar Babayo Sintari
Funakaye	Bajoga West	Ung. Wakili Bajoga, District Office; Ung. Sarkin Yaki, Kofar Sarkin Yaki; Ung. Sarkin Yaki, Kofar Ali Ado; Ung. Sarkin Yaki, Prison Yaro; Ung. Sarkin Yaki, Kofar Zongo; Ung. Danjajo, Central Pri. Sch.; Ung. Danjajo, Kofar Musa Mai Yabe; Ung. Isa, G. S. S. S. Bajoga; Ung. Isa, Kofar Isa; Ung. Barde, Kofar Barde; Ung. Barde, Women Centre; Ung. Madaki, Dispensary; G. G. S. S., Veternary; G. G. S. S. Bajoga, G. G. S. S. Bajoga; Ung. Maiduguri, Central Pri. Sch.; Sharifuri, Kofar Sarki; Sharifuri, Primary School; Bogga Rabo, Kofar Jauro; Zadawa, Kofar Jauro; Zagaina, Kofar Jauro
Funakaye	Bajoga East	Ung. Mai Gana, Kofar Maigana; Ung. Mai Zara, Kofar Maizara; Ung. Mai Zara, Kofar Bukari; Ung. Makama, Kofar Makama; General Hospital, Post Office; General Hospital, General Hospital; Ung. Bamalum, Kofar Bamalum; Ung. Bamalum, Kofar A. G. Z.; Ung. Bamalum, Railway; Sabon Layi, Kofar Dandara; Ung. Ari, Kofar Mai Ung.; Ung. Bello, Kofar Mai Ung.; Sangaru, Primary School; Sangaru, Kofar Sarki; Garin Aba, Kofar Sarki; Shuwarin, Kofar Jauro; Jauro Yuguda, Primary School; Nayinawa, Kofar Jauro; Dindi Jauro Baba, Kofar Jauro; Jajami, Muhammed Bukar
Funakaye	Bodor / Tilde	Ung. Madaki Tilde, Kofar Madaki; Ung. Madaki Tilde, Dispensary; Ung. Chiroma, Kofar Chiroma; Ung. Chiroma, A. Arewa; Ung. Tafida, Kofar Tafida; Ung. Tafida, Primary School; Gadawo, Kofar Jauro; Gadawo, Kofar Sanda; Ung. Zarma, Kofar Zarma; Ung. Zarma, Kofar Daniya; Ung. Malam Yayaru, Kofar Jauro; Siddi Kiwo Wuro Nareje, Wuro Nareje; Siddi Kiwo Wuro Nareje, Lamido Buba; Siddi Kiwo Wuro Nareje, Kofar Kwairanga; Bodor, Kofar Sarki; Ung. Waziri, Kofar Waziri; Ung. Galadima, Pri. Sch.; Ung. Madaki, Dispensary; Chiroma Saleri, Kofar Jauro; Ardo Yaya, Kofar Ardo Yaya; Jauro Ali, Kofar Jauro Ali; Jauro Dandaso, Kofar Jauro Dandaso; Jauro Gidado, Kofar Jauro Gidado
Funakaye	Jillahi	Ung. Bauchi Jillahi, Kofar Sarki; Ung. Madaki, Pri. Sch.; Ung. Galadima, Dispensary; Busum, Kofar Jauro; Wuro Arsi, Pri. Sch.; Dubbel, Pri. Sch.; Primary / School / Marmagani; Jagabali, Kofar Jauro; Kacacciya, Kofar Jauro; Jarkum, Kofar Jauro; Fetila, Kofar Jauro; Mutuke, Kofar Jauro; Bodoryel, Kofar Jauro; Jamtari, Kofar Jauro; Mangari, Kofar Jauro; Duga Sabo, Kofar Damji
Funakaye	Kupto	Ung. Sarki Kupto, Kofar Babadala; Ung. Galadima, Dispensary; Ung. Chiroma, Primary School; Ung. Bolari, Kofar Jauro; Ung. Jangade, Dispensary; Jauro Mati, Kofar Jauro; Danniski, Kofar Sarki; Hashimari, Kofar Jauro; Gasol, Kofar Jauro; Winde, Kofar Jauro; Malam Goni, Kofar Jauro; Kuka Bakwai, Kofar Jauro; Garin Almakashi, Kofar Jauro; Wuro Kolong, Kofar Jauro; Dan Galadima, Kofar Jauro; Garin Abba, Kofar Jauro; Garin Abare, Kofar Abare
Funakaye	Tongo	Ung. Bauchi Tongo, Tongo Area Court; Ung. Yerima, Primary School; Ung. S/Tingabu, Sarkin Tingabu; Ung. Ardo Takasa, Ardo Takasa; Ung. Sarkin Yaki, Sarki Yaki; Ung. Ajigin, Ajigin; Ung. Ardo Adu, Ardo Adu; Ung. Nasarawa, Veterinary; Ung. Ardo Baddi, Kofar Ardo Adu; Yarda, Kofar Ardo Sarki; Yardo, Primary School; Sisbako, Kofar Jauro; Damawake, Kofar Jauro; Gadari, Kofar Jauro; Wuro Dole, Kofar Jauro; Gerengi, Kofar Jauro; Ngol Katari, Kofar Jauro; Wuro Kohel, Jauro Alkali
Funakaye	Wawa / Wakkulutu	Ung. Madaki Wawa, Primary School; Ung. Galadima, Kofar Galadima; Ung. Fulani, Kofar Mai Ung.; Ung. Sarki Yaki, Kofar Sarki Yaki; Komi Bolewa, Primary School; Komi Bolewa, Kofar Sarki; Zongoma Kari, Kofar Sarki; Zongoma Kari, Primary School; Wakkaltu, Primary School; Zazimari, Kofar Jauro; Bogga Reduwa, Kofar Jauro; Garin Alkali, Kofar Jauro; Komi Kufayi, Kofar Haruna
Gombe	Bajoga	Jibir Dukku, Bus Stop; Babayo Bello, Idi Primary School; Babayo Bello, Kofar Sale Kafinta; Usman Memorial, Usman Memorial; M/Ung. Jabbo, Kofar M/Ung. Jabbo; Federal Low Cost I, Federal Low Cost; Federal Low Cost II, Federal Low Cost; Wuro Ledde, Kofar Jauro Ledde; Mallam Shehu, Kofar Mallam Shehu; Zurkallaini, Idi Primary School; Zurkallaini, Kofar Zurkallaini
Gombe	Bolari East	Ajayi Fatumbi, Kofar Ajayi Fatumbi; Usman Faruk I, Kofar Usman Faruk; Usman Faruk II, Kofar Usman Faruk; Usman Faruk, Kofar Yaya Arabi; Audu Biu, Kofar Audu Biu; Audu Biu, Kamara Pri. Sch.; Magaji Saidu, Kamara Pri. Sch.; Magaji Saidu, Kofar Babaru Bolari; Magaji Saidu, Kofar Malam Saidu; Magaji Saidu, Tsamiya; Army Children School, Army Children School; Army Children, Army Children School; Waziri Bolari, Bolari Maternity; Waziri Bolari, Kofar Ali Dogo; Wakili Goni, Bolari Area Court; Co-Operative Stores, Co-Operative Stores; Bamusa, Kofar Jauro Bamusa
Gombe	Bolari West	Kofar A. B. Bomala / A. B. Bomala; A. B. Bomala, Kofar Audu Kwado; A. B. Bomala, Kofar Danladi Jalo; Kadiri Mai Tabarma, Kofar Mai Tabarma; Galadima Umaru, Kofar Umar; Galadima Umaru, Gidan Rimi; Balulu, Temp. House Of Assembly; Balulu, Kofar Balulu; Balulu, Kofar Audu Wuyo; Kasuwa Zana, Kasuwar Zana; Waziri Bolari, Kofar W. Bolari; Kasuwa Chiroma, Kofar J. K. Chiyawa; A. A. Haruna, Kofar A. A. Haruna
Gombe	Herwagana	Bunu, Kofar S. Bunu; Ma'Aji Abba, Kofar M. Abba; Kogga I, Hassan Pri. Sch.; Kogga II, Hassan Pri. Sch.; Manzo, Hassan Pri. Sch.; Yakubu, Kofar Yakubu; Adamu Damanda, Kofar A. Damanda; Herwagana, Herwagana Pri. Sch.; Alh. Kawu Adamu, Kofar Dan Maliki; Usman Kafinta, Kofar U. Kafinta; Dan Daura I, Kofar Dan Daura; Dan Daura II, Kofar Dan Daura; Alh. Malami, Kofar A. Malami; Ibrahim Sokoto, K/I Ibrahim Sokoto; Kalshingi, K/Ali Kalshingi; Aliyu Dala, K/Aliyu Dala; Yusuf Bayarbe, Kofar Y. Bayarbe; Ibrahim Penta, Kofar I. Penta; Maudo I, Kofar Maudo; Maudo II, Kofar Maudo
Gombe	Jeka Dafari	Goni Ali, Kofar Goni Ali; Sarkin Fata, Kofar Sarkin Fata; Hassan Kwadon, Kofar H. Kwadon; Ung. Doma, Doma Area Court; Kani, Kofar Kani; Umaru Adamu, Kofar U. Adamu; Saidu Mangu, Kofar S. Mangu; Buzu, Kofar Buzu; Magaji Rumbudi, Kofar Magaji R.; Yahaya Umaru, Kofar Y. Umaru; Usman Asibity, Kofar U. Asibity; Mele Mai Gishiri, K. M. Mai Gishiri; Ibrahim Nayaya, K. Ibrahim Nayaya; Malma Mamman, K. M. Mamman; Malam Mamman, K. M. Mamman; Modibo Tukur, K. M. Tukur; Alh. Sarki, Kofar Alh. Sarki; Checheniya, K. Bappayo Jamjam; Nayaya, Min. Of Education; Namadi, Kofar Namadi; Tsamiya, Kofar J. Tsamiya; Buhari Estate, Buhari Estate; Immigration Office, Immigration Office; Immigration Quarters, Immigration Quarters; Wanzam, K. Adamu Wanzam; Upper Benue, K. Upper Benue; Bappah Tirebo, K/Bappah Tirebo; Mai Saka, Kofar Mai Saka; J. I. Orji, J. I. Orji Quarters
Gombe	Kumbiya - Kumbiya	Goje, Kofar Goje; Alh. Yakubu, Hassan Pri. Sch.; Hassan Pri. Sch., Hassan Pri. Sch.; Sarkin Doka, Kofar S. Doka; Audu Bojude I, Kofar A. Bojude; Audu Bojude II, Kofar A. Bojude; Nepa Office, K. Nepa Office; Ishiyaku, K. Nepa Office; Chiroma, Kofar Chiroma; Adamu Masinja, Kofar A. Masinja; Umaru Mabuga, K. U. Mabuga; Mai Gishiri, Kofar Mai Gishiri; Mijinyawa, Adult Education
Gombe	Nasarawa	Yalah Guruza, K. J. Yalan Guruza; Jauro Nasarawa I, K. Nasarawa Pri. Sch.; Jauro Nasarawa II, K. Nasarawa Pri. Sch.; Malam Bappa, Kofar M. Bappa; Julde, Kofar Julde; Sodengi, Kofar J. Sodengi; Sabon Gari Danlami, Kofar M. Danlami
Gombe	Pantami	Sarkin Pantami, Kofar S. Pantami; Wakili Hamza, Kofar W. Hamza; Abba, Kofar Abba; Zakarawa, Kofar J. Zakarawa; Parasha, Kofar Parasha; Malam Maina, Kofar M. Maina; Sarkin Gabukka, Kofar S. Gabukka; Gabukka Pri. Sch., Gabukka Pri. Sch.; Jauro Bappi, Kofar J. Bappi; Jauro Mamuda, Kofar J. Mamuda; Malam Kuri I, Pantami Pri. Sch.; Malam Kuri II, Pantami Pri. Sch.; Moh'D Mai Siminti, K/M. Mai Siminti; Wakili Madu, Kofar Wakili Madu; Maternity, Pantami Maternity; G. S. A. D. P., Kofar G. S. A. D. P.; L. Dambam, Kofar L. Dambam; Manawashi, K/J Manawashi
Gombe	Shamaki	Musa Hadeja, Kofar M. Hadeja; Lamido Magaba, Kofar L. Magaba; Moh'D Bojude, Kofar M. Bojude; Moh'D Bojude, Pilot Junior Sec. Sch.; Yayajo I, Veterinary Office; Yayajo II, Veterinary Office; Sarkin Shanu, Kofar S. Shanu; Shamaki, Kofar Shamaki; Jauro Abare I, Kofar J. Abare; Jauro Abare II, Kofar J. Abare; K. Gana, Kofar K. Gana; Jauro Babayo, Jauro Kuna; A. T. C. Gombe, A. T. C. Gombe; T. C. Gombe I, T. C.; T. C. Gombe II, T. C.; Sani Pindiga, Kofar S. Pindiga; Yerima Jalo, K. Yerima Jalo; Koron Giwa, Kofar Minna; Lamido, Kofar Lamido; Sarkin Rakuma, Kofar S. Rakuma; Usman Malala, K. Usman Malala; Idi Nakaka, Kofar Idi Nakaka; Idi Nakaka, Gandu J. S. S.; Musa, Kofar Musa; Bubayero, Kofar Bubayero; Bogga Shawara I, T/Wada Pri. Sch.; Bogga Shawara II, T/Wada Pri. Sch.; Alh. Garba Mai Magani, K. G. Maimagani; Kaga Rawol Pri. Sch (Kaga Rawol K. Maikudi Usman)
Kaltungo	Awak	Dogon Ruwa, Kofar S. Rafi; Kwalashine, Kofar Fada; Kan Gari, Kofar J. Musa; Kan Gari II, Kofar J. Musa; Ubandoma, Primary School; Garin Korau, Kofar J. Korau; Garin Bako, Kofar J. Bako; Dogon Ruwa, K/ J /Dan Zaria; Jauro Abdu, K/ J/ Abdu; Kwabi Lake / Fun / J. Abdu, K/J Samaila; Dundaye, K. Namadi; Dogon Ruwa, Kofar Jauro Mani; Dogon Ruwa, K. M. Hussaini; Garin Barau, Kofar Jauro Barau; Garin Bako Kofar Jauro Damance; Kwalashine, Kwalashine Pri. Sch.; Kwalashine, K. Galadima; Kwalashine, Ung. Fulani; Soblong, Primary School; Tanga, Annex Primary School; Kunge, K. Galadima; Jauro Gotel, K. J. Umaru; Saliyawa, K. J. Saliyawa; Daura, K. J. Daura; Luggayidi, K. J. Luggayidi; Yeri Bwara, Primary School; Tayo Primary School; Laitatshine Kofar Jauro Yabawo
Kaltungo	Bule / Kaltin	Balamusa / Kway, K/J Balamusa; Bayunse / Bindidbin, K/J Yaya; Kaltin, Kaltin Pri. Sch.; Nahuta, Nahuta Pri. Sch.; Yabde / B. Baka, Kofar J. Yelman; Yakubu/Kwale Kofar J Ladir; Bankgwe, Kofar Jauro Abubakar; Jauro Ali / J. Hashimi, Kofar Jauro Ali; J. Abdu / J. Dinya / Jauro Umaru, Kofar Jauro Umar; J / Madaki / J/ Nadaba, K. G. Gibir; Sabon Gari, S. G. Pri. Sch.; Bule, Bule Pri. Sch.; Kaltin \B\" Kaltin Pri. Sch."""
Kaltungo	Kaltungo West	Nasarawa \A\" Kaltungo Area Court"""; Nasarawa \B\" Viewing Centre"""; Nasarawa \C\" Kaltungo Pri. Sch."""; Nasarawa \D\" L. E. A. Dispensary"""; Nasarawa \D\" Kaltungo Area Court"""; Ladibin \A\" General Hospital"""; Ladibin \B\" L. G. Secretariat"""; Pondingding, Tul - Kambido; Laikuli, Tul - Mangoro; Kalambu, Poma Daura; Pidimmotong, Tul - Kunji; Kale Kwa, Kambidlabeliswa; Korong, K. Bashari; Okdembe, Tul Kunji; Pokwara, Tulkambido; Pokajang, Poma Abnow; Okbaganje, Poma Baba Inuwa; Dwale, Tul - Dwang; Pidmoki \A \" I T. / Waja Area Court"""; Pidmoki \B \" II T. / Waja Area Court"""; Pidmoki \C \" II Tul Dwang"""; Lakoling \A\" Kalorgu Pri. Sch."""; Lakoling \B\" Lakunji"""; Lakoling \C\" I K. Baba Dauda"""; Lakoling \D\" II K. Baba Dauda"""; Kasarwaje, K. M. Alpinti; Kalorgu, Kaguli; Mahauta, K. Sarkin Pawa
Kaltungo	Kaltungo East	Kalaring \A\" I Kalaring Pri. Sch"""; Kalaring \B\" II Kalaring Pri. Sch."""; Kalaring \C\" Kofar M. Jibir"""; Kalaring \D\" Kofar Waziri"""; Okra \A\" K. Baba Yakubu"""; Aya, K. Mai Ang.; Okra \B\" K. Mai Ang."""; Kaleh \A\" I Kaleh Pri. Sch."""; Kaleh \B\" II Kaleh Pri. Sch."""; Popandi \A\" Popandi Pri. Sch."""; Popandi \B\" K. Mai Anguwa"""; Poshereng \A\" K. M. Galadima"""; Poshereng \B\" K. Kwara"""; Kije, R. C. M. School; Layiro, Layiro Pri. Sch.; Popandi \C\" K. Mai Anguwa"""; Molding, K. Mai Anguwa; Layiro P. / Molding, K. Galadima; Kaluwa, K. M. Kaluwa; Podi, K. M. Podi; Kogde, K. M. Kogde; Bandara, Bandara Pri. Sch.; Purmai, Purmai Pri. Sch.; Lakweme, Lakweme Pri. Sch.; Layiro / Gujuba, K. Mai Anguwa; Layiro / Posheren, Dispensary; Kaluwa, K. Makera
Kaltungo	Kamo	Shenge / Shenge, K. J. Mai Tumbi; Kundulum / Potwana, Yelwa Pri. Sch.; Yelwa, Kofar Sarki; Birwai, K. J. Shaibu; Yelwa Birwai, J/ K Turmi; Konnu, Jalingo Pri. Sch.; Jalingo, Kofar Sarki; Jauro Baba, K/J Baba; Jauro Yerima, Kofar Yerima; Jauro Gale, K/ J Gale; Jauro Saini, K/ J Saini; Zange, K/ J Yahya; Gujuba \A\" K. Sarki"""; Gujuba \B\" K. J. Bose"""; Gujuba \C\" Dinge"""; Kundulu, Latarin Pri. Sch. / Datibo; Nyiti Nyibir, Mosso Pri. Sch.; Dabewa, J/ K Bakari; Yelmine, K. Jauro; Beltibo, Kofar Sarki; Potwana, K. M Ari
Kaltungo	Tula Baule	Bilki Taman, K. Jauro; Kwallam, Baule Pri. Sch.; Bwaitai, Baule Pri. Sch.; Yakwale, Baule Pri. Sch.; Biladira, Baule Pri. Sch.; Jongri /J/Audi, Kofar Jauro; Lungeri / Yelwa, Lungeri Pri. Sch.; Jalingo, Jalingo Pri. Sch.; Kutushe, Jalingo Pri. Sch.; Lafia / Taule, Lafia Pri. Sch.; Taule / Dalan, Lafia Pri. Sch.; Bilatuku, Filantimeh; Lojuro, Filantimeh; Silawanghe, Kofar Jauro; Bilakware I, Kasuwa Fwiti; Bilakware II, Kasuwa Fwiti; Garin Waziri/ Kalari, Jauro Hamidu; Tiye / Bussam, Baswale; Bussa / Bayale, Basuwale
Kaltungo	Tula Wange	Bayam Up I, K/ J Ishiyaku; Bayam Up II, K. J. Ishiyaku; Bayam Down, K/ J Audi; Mararraba, Mararraba; Bekwalume, Bekwalume; Yoriyo, Yoriyo / Lobwi; Fantami, Kofar Jauro Fantami; Kunini, Kofar Jauro Kunini; Bekuntin, K/J Bekunti; Ung. Ma Aikata, Ung. Ma Aikata; Kula Shine / Bwabwi Yang, Tula Pri. Sch.; Kutube I, K. J. Kutube; Kutube II, K. J. Kutube; Butami, K/J Butam; Ung. Halilu / Mission, K. Halilu; Falang, K. J. Falang; Surkwam, K/ J Surkwam
Kaltungo	Tula - Yiri	Ung. Sarki I, Yiri Pri. Sch.; Ung. Sarki II, Yiri Pri. Sch.; Bwane, K. M/ Kma; Baba Galadima, K. Galadima; Kwen, K. M. Kwen; Dadiye, K. M. Kwen; Sabon Layi, K. M. Kwen; Bambam, K. Bako; Galadima Yiri, K. Sarki; Galadima Yiri, G. Yiri Pri. Sch.; Kwarsu \A\" G. Yiri Pri. Sch."""; Kwarsu, K. Yerima; Kwarsu, K. M. Kalaku
Kaltungo	Tungo	Pokwangli \A\" Poma Baba Bula"""; Pokwangli \B\" Tul Lati"""; Limde \A\" Pri. Sch."""; Limde \B\" Tul Dong"""; Wuli \A\" Kal Gomo"""; Wuli \B\" Tul Twal"""; Kampandi \A\" Dispensary"""; Kampandi \B\" Tul Lati"""; Kolwa, Poma B. Yakubu; Tanduru, Poma B. Yakubu; Lawonglong, Tul - Dong; Kashing`, Tul - Dong; Lambara, Tul - Kwalak; Pongwaram, Tul -Kambido; Sakauri, K. Jauro
Kaltungo	Ture	Ture Pandi \A\" I Pandi Pri. Sch."""; Ture Pandi \B\" II Pandi Pri. Sch."""; Ture Mai, Ture Mai Pri. Sch.; Ture Okra, K. M. Ung; Ture Kwe \A\" K. M. Ung. Kwe"""; Ture Balam \A\" I Balam Pri. Sch."""; Ture Balam \B\" II Balam Pri. Sch."""; Kalakorok, K. M. Unguwa; Store, K. M. Unguwa; Bedbere, Kofar Waziri; Ture Okwaldi, K. Mai Unguwa; Ture Okwaldi, Dwang
Kwami	Bojude	Babadala, Kofar Babadala; Madaki, Kofar Madaki; Sarki Jore, Kofar Sarki Jore; Jauro Sabo, Kofar Jauro Sabo; Jauro Kawu, Kofar Jauro Kawu; Malam Bappah, Kofar Jauro Bappah; Babadala, Kofar Kosuma; Gabanni, Kofar Sarki Gabanni Kofar Jauro; Bamayi I, Kofar Jauro Bamayi; Bamayi II, Kofar Jauro Bamayi; Tafida Musa, Kofar Tafida Musa; Durokono, Durokono Pri. Sch.; Diri, Kofar Sarkin Diri; Jauro Mauwada, Jauro Mauwda Pri. Sch.; Jauro Yaya, Kofar Jauro Yaya; Bele, Kofar Sarkin Bele; Zambe, Kofar Moh'D. S / Zambe
Kwami	Daban Fulani	Ung. Galadima, Kofar Galadima; Ung. Makwalla, Kofar Musa Mallam; Ung. Makwalla, Kofar M / Ung. Makwalla; Ung. Dan Buran, Daba Pri. Sch.; Ung. Yerima, Maternity; Ung. Yerima, Daba Pri. Sch.; Jauro Yaya, Kofar Jauro Yaya; Nasarawa, Kofar Jauro Nasarawa; Yerima, Kofar M/Ung. Yerima; Dan Buram, Kofar Sarkin Daba; Wuro Jabe, Wuro Jabe Pri. Sch.; Mettako, Kofar M/Ung. Mettako; Ung. Waziri, Primary School; Madaki, Kofar Shugaba Adamu; Hamma Lule, Primary School; Ardo Daba, Kofar Aji; Ardo Daba, Kofar Ardo Daba; Wuro Koha (Mettako), Kofar Jauro Yahaya
Kwami	Doho	Wuro Dole, Wuro Dole Pri. Sch.; Wuro Dole, Dispensary; Mai Ung., Kofar Sarkin Dohe; Mai Ung., Kofar Ajiya; Jauro Bello, Kofar Jauro Bello; Gerema, Kofar Gerema; Ung. Galadima, Doho Pri. Sch.; Ung. Yerima, Maternity; Jalingo, Jalingo Pri. Sch.; Malko, Malko Pri. Sch.; Sharifuri, Kofar Jauro; Jauro Gabdo, Kofar Jauro Gabdo; Lantaiwa, Kofar Jauro Lantaiwa; Alagarno, Alagarno Pri. Sch.; Wuro Tara, Wuro Tara Pri. Sch.; Zangoma Abba, Kofar Zangoma Abba; Jauro Ahmadu / Wuro Tann, Kofar Jauro Ahamadu
Kwami	Gadam	Kobozo, Kobozo Pri. Sch.; Bafuya, Bafuya Pri. Sch.; Gamadadi, Kofar Jauro Baita; Zangoma Gaji, Kofar Jauro Yabu; Bamayi Birin, Bamayi Birin; Bulama Dauda, Sabon Gadam Pri. Sch.; Ganjuwa, Ganjuwa; Ngaji, Kofar Sarkin Dawo; Ngaji Majjoru, Kofar Jauro Abdu; Ngaji Majjoru, Kofar Jauro Gambo; Babadala, Maternity; Babadala, Kofar Babadala; Yalwa Yame, Kofar Yelwa Yame; Yelwa Tafida, Kofar Yelwa Tafida; Ung. Chiroma, Kofar Chiroma Tappi; Iyma Kalajanga, Kofar Sarkin Kalajanga; Bomala, Bomala Pri. Sch.; Yelwa Umaru, Kofar Yelwa Umaru; Sarkin Tappi, Kofar Sarkin Tappi; Zongoma Adamu, Zongoma Adamu; Wuro Dole, Wuro Dole Pri. Sch.; Mallam Bappah, Kofar Mallam Bappa; Tedo Gadam, Kofar Mai Ung. Kosuma
Kwami	Komfulata	Damba Barde, K. Sarkin Damba Barde; Bomala, Kofar M. Unguwa; Bomala J. Hamidu, Kofar Jauro Hamidu; Jauro Malam, Jauro Malam; Dinawa Bakka, K. J. Dinawa Bakka; Garin Wakili, K. J. Garin Wakili; Bula Barde, Bula Pri. Sch.; Garin Abbas, K. J. Garin Abbas; Gabuka, Gabukka Pri. Sch.; Garin Bunu, K. J. Garin Bunu; Dokari, Kofar Jauro Dokari; Jada, Kofar Jauro; Jamji I, Kofar Sarkin Jamji; Jamji II, Kofar Sarkin Jamji; Jamji I, Jamji Pri. Sch.; Jamji II, Jamji Pri. Sch.; Jamji Zongoma Amsani, Kofar Zongoma Amsan; Shong S / Yaki, Shongo Pri. Sch.; Jauro Manga, Kofar Jauro Manga; Jauro Yaro, Kofar Jauro Yaro; Garin Tuguji, Kofar Jauro Tuguji; Malam Dalli, Kofar Mallam Dalli; Garin Alkali, Kofar Jauro; Garin Yuguda, Kofar Jauro Yuguda; Wudel, Kofar Jauro Wudel; Daniya Sarki, Kofar Sarki Daniya; Daniya Sarki, Kofar Daniya Sarki; Sarkin Dinawa, Dinawa Pri. Sch.; Bappate, Kofar Jauro; Garin Dalla, K / Dallai Bapeto; Dinawa Pantami, Kofar Jauro; Sarkin Kom, Kom Dispensary; Girgam, K/ Sarkin Girgam; Kan Giwa, K/ Sarkin Kan Giwa; Bemi, Bemi Maternity; Dumbona, Dunbona; Bappa Tukur, Kofar Bappa Tukur; Abba Nanami, K. / Mai Unguwa
Kwami	Kwami	Sarkin Kwami, K/ Sarkin Kwami; Tudun Wada, Pri. Sch. Kwami; Baba Dala, Kwami Pri. Sch.; Pawo, Kofar Galadima; Shongo Dirango, Shongo Dirango; Girema, Kofar Galadima; Babadala, Kwami Pri. Sch.; Sarkin Kulum, Kofar Sarkin Kulum; Zongoma Mamman, Zongomza Pri. Sch.; Ganjuwa, Kofar S/ Ganjuma; Sarkin Noma Kulum, Kofar S/ Noma; Yerima Kagum, Kofar Yerima Kagum; Shangayari, Kofar Shangayari; Titi, Titi Pri. Sch.; Yerima Goje, K. /Yerima Goje; Wuro Bundu, K. Jauro; Yerima Gomboni, K. Yerima Gambo; Jauro Dalil, Kofar Jauro Dalil; Ardo Abdu, K. Ardo Abdu; Sabon Garin Kwami, K. Jauro; Tale, K. Jauro Tale; Garin Wakili, Garin Wakili Pri. Sch.; Yankari, K. Sarkin Yankari; Malam Jamji, Madukellumi; Malam Maji, K. Malam Maji; Galadima Gerkwami, K. Galadima; Kolori, Kolori Pri. Sch.; Sarkin Kufayi, Kufayi Dispensary; Gerkwami, Gerkwami Pri. Sch.; Galadima, Kofar Jauro
Kwami	Malam Sidi	Mai Ung. Madu, Kofar Madugu; Mai Ung. Yerima, Kofar Yerima; Kofar Ajiya, M/ Sidi Pri. Sch.; Kofar Ajiya, M/ Sidi Area Court; Madaki Jamji, Kofar Jauro; Kofar Ajiya, Adult Educ. Office; Garin Jauro Bayo, Kofar Jauro Bayo; Zangoma Kurugu, Kurugu Pri. Sch.; Madugu Yashi, Madugu Yashi Pri. Sch.; Magumari, Kofar S/ Magumari; Zangoma Kyari, Zangoma Pri. Sch.; Kyari Madaki, Kofar S/ Kyari; Nahuta Kanuri, Kofar J/ Nahuta; Jauro Ahmadu, Kofar J/ Ahmadu; Sabon Gari, Kofar J/ Sabon Gari; Tanna, Kofar Tanna; Majeri, Kofar Majeri; Zangoma West, Zangoma West; Bukkati, Kofar Bukkati; Dawaki, Kofar J/ Dawaki; Kurugu ( Malam Tafida), Pri. Sch.
Kwami	Malleri	Chiroma, Kofar Chiroma; Madaki, Malleri Pri. Sch.; Masuri, Kofar Masuri; Yerima, Kofar Yerima; Galadima, Dispensary; Makera, Makera; Yayari, Kofar Alh. Yayari; Jauro Tinda, Kofar Jauro Tinda; Jauro Haji, Kofar Jauro Haji; Tinda Bappa, Kofar Jauro Bappa; Tinda Sabuwa, Kofar Jauro Tinda Sabuwa; Feshare, Kofar Jauro Baba
Nafada	Barwo / Nasarawo	Ung. Yerima, Kofar Sarki; Ung. Madaki, Pri. School; Ung. Madaki, Kofar Madaki; Barwo S/ Gari, Kofar Sarki; Barwo S/ Gari, Kofar Majidadi; Kanji, Kofar Galadima; Wakkaltu, Kofar Sarki; Kukawari, Kofar Sarki; Feshingo, Kofar Sarki; Lafiyawo, Kofar Jauro Shehu; Zadawa, Kofar Jauro Ahmadu; Dadinkowa, Kofar Jauro Jeiyo; Lumputi, Kofar Jauro Mamuda
Nafada	Barwo Winde	Ung. Madaki, Kofar Madaki; Ung. Galadima, Kofar Galadima; Ung. Madaki / Primary School; Gani Yana, Kofar Sarki; Kaki Yawa, Kofar Sarki; Zadawa, Kofar Sarki; Guriya, Kofar M. Gidado; Daba, Kofar M. Gidado; Wuro Jabbi, Kofar Sarki; Wuro Jabbi, Kofar Jauro; Wuro Juli, Kofar J. Musa
Nafada	Birin Bolewa	Ung. Galadima, Kofar Galadima; Ung. Dawaki, Kofar Chiroma; Buraru, Kofar J. Buraru; Tashan Kargo, Kofar J. Ali; Wuro Abba, Kofar Alh. Manu; Gulmari, Kofar Sarki; Dange, Kofar J. Abba; Munda, Kofar J. Munda; Mai Dukuli, Kofar Sarki; Dange, Kofar J. Dura; Kunkururi, Kofar J. Gimba; Dawaki, Kofar J. Dawaki; Madakiri, Kofar J. Garga; Abba Isari, Kofar Mai Isari
Nafada	Birin Fulani East	Ung. Galadima, Kofar Ubandoma; Ung. Barde, Primary School; Ung. Ubandoma, Kofar Sarki; Sodingo, Primary School; Sorodo, Kofarn J. Gani; Gurajawa, Kofar Mal. Abdu; Gadi, Kofar J. Gadi; Lumbo Dashi, Kofar J. Lumbo / Dashi
Nafada	Birin Fulani West	Ung. Madaki, Veterinary Office; Wuro Bundu, Kofar J. Ashau; Shaganawa I, Kofar J. Usman; Shaganawa II, Kofar J. Usman; Madaki Lamu / Wagule, Kofar J. Ahmadu; Daba, Kofar J. Jungudo; Wali, Kofar J. Abdulkadir; Jauro Alh., Kofar J. Alh.
Nafada	Gudukku	Ung. Chiroma, Kofar Sarki; Ung. Ubandoma, Kofar Ubandoma; Gashinge, Kofar J. Adamu; Wuro Bege, Kofar J. Moh'D; Gadum, Kofar J. Saidu; Lariski, Kofar J. Idrisa; Walowal, Kofar J. Ahmadu; Yelwa, Kofar J. Usman; Zange Sule, Kofar J. Ali; Garin Zangi, Kofar J. Mai Dabara; Sabon Sara, Sabon Sara
Nafada	Jigawa	Ung. Yerima, Kofar Sarki; Kuka, Kofar J. Musa; Takai, Kofar J. Boka; Dendele, Kofar Sarki; Denlele, Kofar Denlele; Suko, Kofar J. Yahai; Gudukku Yamma, Kofar Gudukku Yamma; Kiyayo, Kofar Sarki; Jolle, Kofar Usman Jolle; Jolle, Kofar Madaki; Ung. Yerima, Kofar S. Fawa; Jangama, Kofar J. Angama; Lange, Kofar J. Lange
Nafada	Nafada Central	Ung. Madaki, Kofar Madaki; Ung. Madaki, Disrrict Head Office; Njalkam, Kofar J./Idrisa; Papa, Kofar Jauro Musa; Yabulas. Kofar Jauro Ali; Wuro, Kofar J/ Maji; Ardo Abba, Kofar Dafa Shama; Ardo Siddi, Kofar J. Sidi; Maruwa, Kofar J. Abduwa; Papa, K/J/ Papa
Nafada	Nafada East	Ung. Maagaji I, Dauda Bola; Ung. Maagaji II, Dauda Bola; Ung. Ubandoma, Kofar Ubandoma; Dallati, Central Pri. Sch.; Dallati, Viewing Centre; Shole Mango, Primary School; Shole Goi-Goi, Kofar J. Manu; Gadari Chesderi, Kofar J. Gadari; Shole Jada, Kofar J. Alh. Ali; Ubandoma, Central Pri. Sch.
Nafada	Nafada West	Ung. Galadima, Kofar Galadima; Makidibu, Kofar Makidibu; Makidibu, Kofar Musa Dada; Ardo Hari, Kofar Alh. Tsoho; Mada, Kofar Sarki; Mada, Kofar J. Barde; Mada, Mande Pri. Sch.; Ung. Bauchi, Kofar Bauchi; Ung. Bauchi, Kofar Abba Jani; Wuro Boggga, K/J/ Wuro Bogga
Shongom	Bangunji	Galadimaru, Kofar J/Hamma; Nabang, Bagunji Pri. Sch.; Kaloh, Kofar J/ Danbaki; Kaloh, Kofar J. / John; Bangy, Kofar J. Danfe
Shongom	Boh	Kalkuto, Kofar Jauro; Layange, Karel Dispensary; Kalbulak, Kofar J/ Joram; Kinawe, Chiefs Palace; Kikwaka, L. G. A. Secretariat; Labeke, Kofar J/ Labeke; Agbun/ Lataki, Kofar J/ Agbun; Pokata, Pokata Pri. Sch.; Lawishi, Kofar J/Dila
Shongom	Burak	Sabon Layi Bukar; Dejam / Lasanjang, Burak Pry. Sch.; Kaloh K. J Danbaki; Tidi, Kofar J/ Liman; Kwanan Kuka, Pry. Sch.; Nywalima, Kofar J/Hassan
Shongom	Filiya	Yakwandi / Filiya Pri. Sch.; Unguwa Rogo, Kofar Maiung.; Dodimo / Hausawa, Kofar J. /Tukur; Dodimo / Hausawa, Kofar Alh. Audu; Ankonbo F. Kasa, Kofar J/ Danbiram; Ankonbo F. Kasa, Kofar J/ Mati; Anyakubi / Choge, Kofar M. Agadi; Anyakubi / Choge, Pero Pri. Sch.; Jauro Sajo / Lababale, Jauro Sajo Pri. Sch.; Diga / Yaganga / Yabandi, Kofar J/Maikudi; Yapilo / Yanga / Yelwa, Kofar J/Adamu / Diga; Yarwana, Kofar J/Alhassan; Yapandi / Chewege, Kofar Miya
Shongom	Gundale	Ampokboje, Kofar J/Ampokboje; Kambuluk, Gundale Pri. Sch.; Gurwa, Kofar J/Gurwa; Dwaja, Dwaja Pri. Sch.; Dwala, Kofar J/Sale; Dwaja / Kofar J/Dahiru
Shongom	Gwandum	Kurmi, Gwandum Pri. Sch; Balade, Kofar Sarki; Garko, Kofar Magaji Bunu; Damjigiri / Kuka / Kodile, Kukar Pri. Sch.; Keffi, Keffi Pri. Sch.; Toro, Kofar Iliyasu; Majidadi, Kofar J. / Ajuyi; Yelwa, Yelwa K./ Jauro; Popandi / Katagum, Kofar J. / Buba; Pamadu / Kwale / Janye, Pamadu Pri. Sch.; Gujuba, Kofar J/ Nakashere; Pokulun, Pri. Sch. Pokulun; Gwarah / Gahamari, Kofar J/ Danladi; Lalingling, Kofar J/ Babayo; Tambau / Gwalanmachi, Kofar J/ Dansomoro; Garu / Golombi, Kofar Dan Asali
Shongom	Kulishin	Kulishin, Kofar J/ Baka; Kalishin / Kul, Kofar Nuhu; Kulishin I, Kulishin Pri. Sch.; Kulishin II, Kulishin Pri. Sch.; Lashi Koldok, Kofar Ajiya Shongom; Lashi Koldok, Kofar J/ Ezira; Pokwanli Shongom / Lakai, Kofar Pokwanli
Shongom	Kushi	Gomle, Kushi Pri. Sch.; Ladangor, Kofar J/ Ladangor; Gomle, Kofar J/ Bulus; Kauri, Kofar Mohammed; Kauri, Kofar J/ Kachalla; Kommo, Kofar J/ Bulus; Dirang, Kofar J/ Bala; Lapandimtai, Lapandimtai Pri. Sch.
Shongom	Lalaipido	Lalaipido I, Lalaipido Pri. Sch.; Lalaipido II, Lalaipido Pri. Sch.; Kamtiktik, Kofar J/Kamtiktik; Shagu, Kofar J/ Salaki; Lakenturum, Lakenturum Pri. Sch.; Lakenturum / Kullung, Kofar J/ Kullung; Lasadar, Kofar J/ Abiu; Latatar, Latatar Pri. Sch.; Tedmukzu, Kofar Kefas; Laur / Kwaipipi, Kofar J/Latur; Polakwang, Kofar J / Sa'Ude; Polakata, Kofar J Polakata
Shongom	Lapan	Mango I, Kofar J / Akwage; Mango II, Kofar J / Akwage; Kwalkwari I, J. S. S. S. Lapan; Kwalkwari II, J. S. S. S. Lapan; Kalaku, Kofar Alh. Mohammed; Kalaku, Kofar Laratu; Lalektar I, Lalatar Pri. Sch.; Lalektar II, Lalatar Pri. Sch.; Lassasap, Kofar J./ Peter; Labayo, Lassasar Pri. Sch.; Lasanjang,. Lasangjang Pri. Sch.
Yalmaltu/ Deba	Deba	Dalti, Central Pri. Sch. Deba; Ung. Dalti, Kofar Mai Ung.; Jauro Isa, Kofar J. Isa; Bagin J. Madi, Kofar J. Madi; Dalti II, Kofar Dandami; Jauro Shawuya, Kofar J. Shawuya; Jauro Baba, Kofar J. Baba; Parkuma I, Kofar Hakimi; Parkuma II, Kofar Galadima; Kubat Jauro Sule, Kofar J. Sule; Tudun Wada, Kofar Mai Ung. Janar; Jauro Alh., Kofar Alh.; Yalwan Garko, Kofar Jauro Garko; Pandaya, Kofar J. Pandaya; Zange Ali, Kofar J. Ali; Pukuma I, Kofar Yerima; Pukuma II, Kofar Yerima; Fage I, Cent Store Deba; Fage II, Old Dispensary; Fage III, Kofar Jauro; Poli Jauro Baba, Kofar Jauro; Jauro Jinka, Kofar J. Jinka; Kadavur, Kofar Malam Leka; Kadavur, Kofar Birni Jeka Musa; Gulmari, Kofar J. Gulmari; Tudun Wada Ilu, Kofar J. Ilu; Saruje, Kofar Jauro Saruje; Dangi J. Manu, Kofar Jauro Manu; Bakari, Kofar J. Bakari; Poli J. Baba, Kofar Jauro Baba; Dakamna, Kofar J. Dakamna; Zongomari, Kofar J. Zongomari; Dangi J. Dabo, Kofar J. Dabo; Butari, Kofar J. Butari; Baka Sulei, Kofar Baka Sule; Saminaka / Wakili, Kofar J. Saminaka; Wuro Laude, Kofar J. Laude
Yalmaltu/ Deba	Difa / Lubo / Kinafa	Galadima, Primary Sch. Difa; Yerima, Kofar Yerima; Hamma Jamaare, Kofar Jauro; J. Kudi, Kofar J. Kudi; Keldima, Kofar Keldima; Yerima II, Difa Dispensary; Jauro Aminu, Kofar J. Aminu; Kofar Sarkin Kinafa, Kofar S. Kinafa; Inde Barwa, Kofar Jauro; Jauro Garba, Kofar J. Garba; Galadima, Pri. Sch. Lubo; K. Sarkin Lubo, Kofar Sarki; Kesuwa, Kofar / Jauro; Garin Malam Umaru (Lubo), Kofar J. Umaru; Nahuta Dauda I, Kofar Jauro; Nahuta Dauda \A\" II Kofar Jauro"""; Jauro Bappi, Kofar Jauro Bappi; Mallam Maude, Kofar Jauro; Gammadi, Kofar J. Gammadi; Mallam Baba, Kofar Jauro Baba; Nahuta J. Baba, Kofar J. Nahuta
Yalmaltu/ Deba	Gwani / Shinga / Wade	Galadima I, Kofar Galadima; Galadima II, Kofar Galadima; Mishelkala I, Pri. Sch. Wade; Mishelkala II, Pri. Sch. Wade; Gadam, Kofar Jauro; Garin Koshi, Kofar Sarki; Kofar Liman, Kofar Liman; Bera Zarma, Pri. Sch. Garin Koshi; Lafiya Garba, Kofar Jauro; Tero, Kofar Jauro; Yelwa, Kofar Jauro; Zarma, Pri. Sch. Shinga; Gurda Kofar Jauro, Kofar Jauro; Mallamawa, Kofar Jauro; Danaje Isa, Kofar Jauro; Magaji Bakin Kasuwa, Bakin Kasuwa Shinga; Jauro Umaru, Kofar Jauro Umaru; Alh. S. Maje, Kofar S. Maje; Ung. Sarkin Kubu, Kofar Sarkin Kubu; Wakili Kubu, Kofar Jauro; Ardo Gajere, Kofar Ardo Gajere; Kofar S. Kalo, Kofar S. Kalo; Anguwan Yarima, Kofar Sarki Shinga; Waziri Kalo, Kofar J. Waziri; Danaje Liman, Kofar Liman; Galadima Shetima, Kofar Galadima; Daluku Kubu, Kofar Sarki; Damai, Kofar J. Damai; Babale, Kofar J. Babale; Alh. Mai Goro, Kofar Alh. Mai Goro; Daluku Gwani, Kofar Ardo; Galadima, Kofar Galadima; Kofar Alh. Umaru Shinga / Kofar Alh. Umaru; Lafiya Bature, Kofar J. Lafiya; Saminaka Zoto, Kofar Jauro; Nasarawa, Kofar Jauro; Garin Waziri, Kofar Waziri; Kalgari, Kofar Jauro; Murna, Kofar Jauro; Tudun Wada, Kofar Jauro
Yalmaltu/ Deba	Hinna	Ung. Galadima, Hinna Pri. Sch.; Ung. Batari, Kofar Batari; Tasha Hinna, Kofar Mai Ung.; Kanti Hinna, Kofar Mai Ung.; Yaranduwa I, Kofar Jauro; Yaranduwa II, Kofar J. Mai Giya; Tasha Hinna II, G. . S. A. D. P.; Ung. Zarma, Kofar Zarma; Murhu Uku, Kofar Jauro; Yanranduwa Iliyasu, Kofar Iliyasu; Dadin Kowa, Kofar Mai Ung.; Dadin Kowa, Dispensary; Tunga Isa, Kofar Mai Ung.; Jata Kadima, Kofar J. Kadima; Galadima, Kofar Galadima; Dakum K. Sarki, Kofar Sarki; Makera, Kofar Mai Burodi; Dakum Alh. Ibrahim, Kofar Ibrahim; Garin Sarki, Bello Pri. Sch.; Mamman Sale, Kofar Mamman; Colony, Kofar Jauro; Kofar J. M. Ibrahim, Kofar Jauro; Jangargari, Kofar Mai Ung; Rafin Samu, Kofar Mai Gari; Tsando, Kofar Maiunguwa; Tsando II, Kofar Chilaya; Bangu Jangargari, Kofar Jauro; Ung. Lawan, K. M Lawan; Tsando Maiung. Habu, Pri. Sch. Tsando; Tsando B/ Kasuwa, Market Stall; Kukawa, Kofar Mai Ung.; Garin Abdullahi, Kofar J. Abdullahi; Gwalfade, Kofar J. Gwalfade; Makera, Kofar Makera; Ardo Bahago, Kofar J. Bahago; Kukawa II, Kukawa Pri. Sch.
Yalmaltu/ Deba	Jagali North	Sarkin Jagali Zarma, Kofar Sarkin Jagali; Jauro Gotel, Kofar Sarkin J. Gotel; Bachadi, Kofar J. Bachadi; Dampala, Kofar J. Dampala; Jauro Dano, Kofar J. Dano; Dandela, Kofar Mai Gari; Tuwirma, Tuwirma Pri. Sch.; Maikaho I, Kofar Sarki; Sabon Layi, K/Mai Ung. Maikaho; Sabon Gari, Vet Office Mai Kaho; Jauro Musa Kadi, Kofar J. Musa Kadi; Jauro Bello, Kofar J. Bello; Maikaho II, Pri. Sch. Maikaho; Ardo Ali, Kofar Ali Ardo; Dasa, Pri. Sch. Dasa; Tashan Kuka, Kofar Mai Gari; Kofar Jauro Isa; Jauro Lawan, Kofar Jauro Lawan; Jauro Umaru Yahya, Kofar J. Umaru Yahya; Gobirawa, Kofar Jauro; Mallam Garba, Kofar M. Garba; Dombulon, Kofar J. Dombulon
Yalmaltu/ Deba	Jagali South	Ung. Mahdi, Kofar Sarki; Ung. Kala, Kofar Kala; Jauro Saleh, Kofar Jauro; Pata, Kofar S. Pata; Jauro Yamu, Kofar J. Yamu; Dahirma, Kofar J. Dahirma; Jauro Sule, Kofar J. Sule; Pata, Pata Pri. Sch.; Dan Galadima, Kofar Dan Galadima; Dogon Kawo, Kofar J. Mahdi; Jigawan Bature, Kofar J. Isa; Jauro Mu'Azu, Kofar Mu'Azu; Jauro Ahmadi, Kofar J. Ahmadi; Jauro Tukur, Kofar J. Tukur; Kurjale Pri. Sch., Pri. Sch. Kurjale
Yalmaltu/ Deba	Kanawa / Wajari	Kanawa / Bagurum, Pri. Sch. Kanawa; Kundulum, Kofar J. Kundulum; Wuro Tale, Kofar J. Tale; Jannawo, Kofar J. Jannawo; Sabon Birni, Kofar J. Sabon Birni; Garin Yerima, Kofar Jauro Yerima; Kachallari, Kofar J. Kachalari Wuro Nai; Jauro Kadiri, Kofar J. Kadiri; Tubule, Kofar J. Tubule; Kachallari, Pri. Sch. Kachalari; Wajari Jodoma, Kofar J. Jodoma; Wajari Lakkau, Pri. Sch. Wajari; Wajari Pillam, Kofar J. Pillam; Gajali, Kofar J. Gajali; Tudun Wada Isa, Kofar J. Isa; Yola J. Hammadu, Kofar J. Hammadu; Kundulum, Pri. Sch. Kundulum; Kundulum, Kofar J. Gambaki; Zagaina, Kofar J. Zagaina; Alagarno, Kofar J. Alagarno; Madaki Kundulum, Kofar J. Kundulum; Dangar Tera, Kofar Tera Jibir; Baraya Waja, Kofar J. Waja; Jauro Dunama, Kofar J. Dunama; Jamari Zangala, Kofar J. Zangala
Yalmaltu/ Deba	Kuri /Lano / Lambam	Moh'D Lambam, Kofar S. Lambam; Ung. Sarki, Dispensary Lambam; Ung. Galadima, Temporary Shade; Yelwa Lambam, Temporary Shade; Ung. Waziri, Kofar Waziri; Jigawa Kawo, Kofar Jauro; Ung. Shanawa, Kofar J. Bawa; Hamma Tatu, Kofar J. Hammatatu; Jauro Tukur, Kofar J. Tukur; Tsamiya J. Dawa, Kofar J. Dawa; Ge- Lambam, Kofar J. Gelambam; Daurawa, Kofar Jauro; Alawa Lambam, Kofar J. Lawan; Maiduguri, Kofar Jauro; Jauro Hammadu K/ Jauro Hammadu; Ngoroje, Kofar Jauro; Jigawa Kawu, Kofar Jauro Iliyasu; Jigawa G/ Makera, Kofar Jauro Makera; Lafiya Isa, Kofar J. Isa; Mundul Nuhu, Kofar J. Nuhu; Daurawa, Kofar J. Daurawa; Lano Sarki, Kofar Sarki; Lano Yamma, Kofar Alh. Audu; Ilela Lano, Kofar Jauro; Boggo, Kofar Ibrahim; Kala Lano, Kofar Kala; Jigawa Kawu Bello, Kofar J. Bello; Ge - Lano, Kofar J. Ge - Lano; Jigawa Magaji, Kofar J. Magaji; Dan Alti, Kofar Jauro; Tudun Wada Hassan, Kofar J. Hassan; Ge - Lano, Pri. Sch.; Kuri M. Ahmadu, Kofar Sarki; Kuri Abdullahi, Kofar Sarki; Kuri S. Noma Gabas, Kofar J. Gabas, Gabas; Kuri M. Buba I, Kofar M. Buba; Kuri M. Buba II, Kofar M. Buba; Sabon Layi Yamma, Kofar Dan Jauro; Sarki Noma Yamma, Kofar S. Noma; Kuri M. Umaru, Kofar M. Umaru; Shimel Umaru, Kofar J. Shimel Umaru; Garin Baushe, Kofar Jauro; Shimel Gidado, Kofar Jauro; Ung. Nasarawo, Kofar J. Nasarawo; Ung. M. Buba, Kofar M. Buba; Kuri Jihadi, Kofar Jauro
Yalmaltu/ Deba	Kwadon / Liji / Kurba	Galadima Kwadon I, Kofar Sarki Kwadon; Galadima Kwadon II, Kofar S. Kwadon; Galadima I, Primary Sch00l; Galadima II, Pri. Sch. Tukulma; Tukulma, Pri. Sch. Tukulma; Kunji, Pri. Sch. Kunji; Gadawo, Kofar J. Gadawo; Yelwa, Pri. Sch. Gadawo; Ngalawo, Kofar J. Ngalawo; Galadima, Pri. Sch. Kurba; Gawari, Kofar Waziri Gawari; Dala, Kofar Sarki; Ung. Hausawa, Kofar Mai Unguwa; Waziri Baba, Kofar Waziri Baba; Batari, Kofar S. New Liji; Batari, Kofar Waziri Gidim; Ung. Birma, Pri. Sch. New Liji; Dala, Kofar S. Old Liji; Garin Kaskuma, K/J Garin Kaskuma; Jauro Ahmadu, Kofar J. Ahmadu; Shongoyel, Kofar J. Shongoyel; Garin M. Jibril, Kofar M. Jibril; Dombolum, Kofar J. Dombolum; London, Kofar J. London; Ardo Salatu, Kofar Ardo Salatu; Lafiya, Kofar J. Gulmari; Kaltanga, Kofar J. Sani; Goneri, Kofar J. Gonery; Wuro Ibba, Ibba Pri. School
Yalmaltu/ Deba	Nono / Kunwal / W. Birdeka	Wudil A. Rafi, Kofar Rafi; Sabon Gari Umaru, Kofar J. Sa'Adu; Wudil M. Isa, Kofar J. Wudil; Mai Jama'A, Kofar Jauro; Garin Magaji, Kofar Magaji; Garin Umaru Bayu, Kofar Umaru Bayu; Mai Ung. Nono, Kofar Mai Ung.; Tafida Daniya, Kofar Tafida; Rarab Kala, Kofar Kala; Baka Sule, Kofar Baka; Dangeza, Kofar Dangeza; Bagin S. Shanu, Kofar J. Shanu; Yerima Mala, Kofar Yerima; Kidda, Kofar J. Kidda; Nahuta Ardo, Kofar Ardo; Nahuta Bello, Kofar Jauro; Nahuta Julde, Kofar J. Julde; Dampami, Kofar Dampami; Nahuta Ardo II, Ardo Deba Pri. Sch.; Madaki, Kofar J. Jamari; Jamari, Kofar J. Jamari; Nahuta Hamma, Kofar J. Hamma; Dakkiti Adamu, Kofar J. Adamu; Jauro Haram, Kofar J. Haram; Jauro Yaya, Kofar J. Yaya; W/ Birdeka Nahau, Kofar Jauro Nahau; Beni J. Sambo, Kofar J. Sambo; Yelwa Gajali, Kofar J. Gajali; Tila, K. Jauro Tila; Yelwa Kufa, Kofar J. Yelwatila Kufa I Yelwatila II; Yelwa Tafida, Kofar Tafida; Wuro Malami, Pri. Sch. Malami; Wuro Malami, Kofar Jauro; Yelwa Madaki, Kofar Madaki; Yelwa Hamza, Kofar Hamza; Boltongo, Kofar J. Boltongo; Boltongo, Pri. Sch. Boltongo; Buba Waja, Kofar J. Waja; Yelwa Mado, Kofar J. Mado
Yalmaltu/ Deba	Zambuk / Kwali	Galadima, Pri. Sch. Kwali; Dabewo, Pri. Sch. Kwali; Ngare, Pri. Sch. Kwali; Batari, Kofar Batari; Wuro Shitta, Kofar Jauro; Galadima, Kofar Sarki Zambuk; Galadima, Bakin Kasuwa; Dala, Kofar Dala; Dala/Kofar Dala I; Dala/Kofar Dala II; Gasi, Pri. Sch. Zambuk I; Gasi, Pri. Sch. Zambuk II; Jauro Sumaye, Kofar J. Sumaye; Jauro Lafiya Beguwa, Kofar Jauro; Gurajawa, Kofar Jauro; Wuro Bokki, Kofar Jauro; Laleko Lai - K. Jauro; Danaje, Kofar J. Danaje; Wakata, Kofar Jauro; Dumbe, Kofar J. Dumbe; Sabon Gari, Kofar Jauro; Kaigamari, Kofar J. Kaigamari; Mallamawa, Kofar J. Mallamawa; Shuari, Kofar Jauro Shuari

Climate
