= Lakai =

Lakai may refer to:

- Lakai Limited Footwear, a company based in Torrance, California
- Lakai (tribe), a tribe of ethnic Uzbeks in Tajikistan
- Peter Lakai (born 2003), New Zealand rugby player
- "Lakai", a song by Casiopea from the 1981 album Eyes of the Mind
- Lakai, a village in Gombe State, Nigeria

== See also ==
- Lakai Lakai, a village in Timbun Mata, Malaysia
