= Tumu =

Tumu may refer to:

== Places ==
- Tumu, Ghana, town in Ghana, upper west region.
- Tumu, Libya, a checkpoint on the Libya–Niger border
- Tumu, Nigeria, a town in Gombe state
- Tumu Fortress, a fortress in the Great Wall of China

== Other ==
- Tumu Crisis, a frontier conflict between the Oirat Mongols and the Chinese Ming dynasty
