= Gwandum =

Gwadum
- Town
- Location within Nigeria
- Coordinates: 9°34′N 11°5′E

Government

Population
  - Total: 139,494
- Time zone: UTC+1 (WAT)

Gwandum is a town in Gombe State, Nigeria. It has a relatively small population.

== Climate ==
The weather in Gwandu is semiarid. The climate is warm to hot all year round, and the drought prevents trees from growing. Sand dominates the landscape, along with scattered grasses and occasionally bushes. Gwandu receives about 485 mm (19.1 in) of precipitation. With an average humidity of 31% and a UV-index of 8, it is dry for 273 days out of the year.
