= Tukulma, Nigeria =

Tukulma
- town
- Location in Nigeria
- Coordinates: 10°07′56″N 10°58′40″E
- Country: Nigeria
- State: Gombe State
- Headquarters: Akko

Government
  - Type: Democratic

Area
  - Total: 1,122 km^{2} (433 sq mi)

Population (2006 census)
  - Ethnicities: Fulani Tangale
  - Religions: mostly populated are Muslims and some few Christians
- Time zone: UTC1 (WAT)

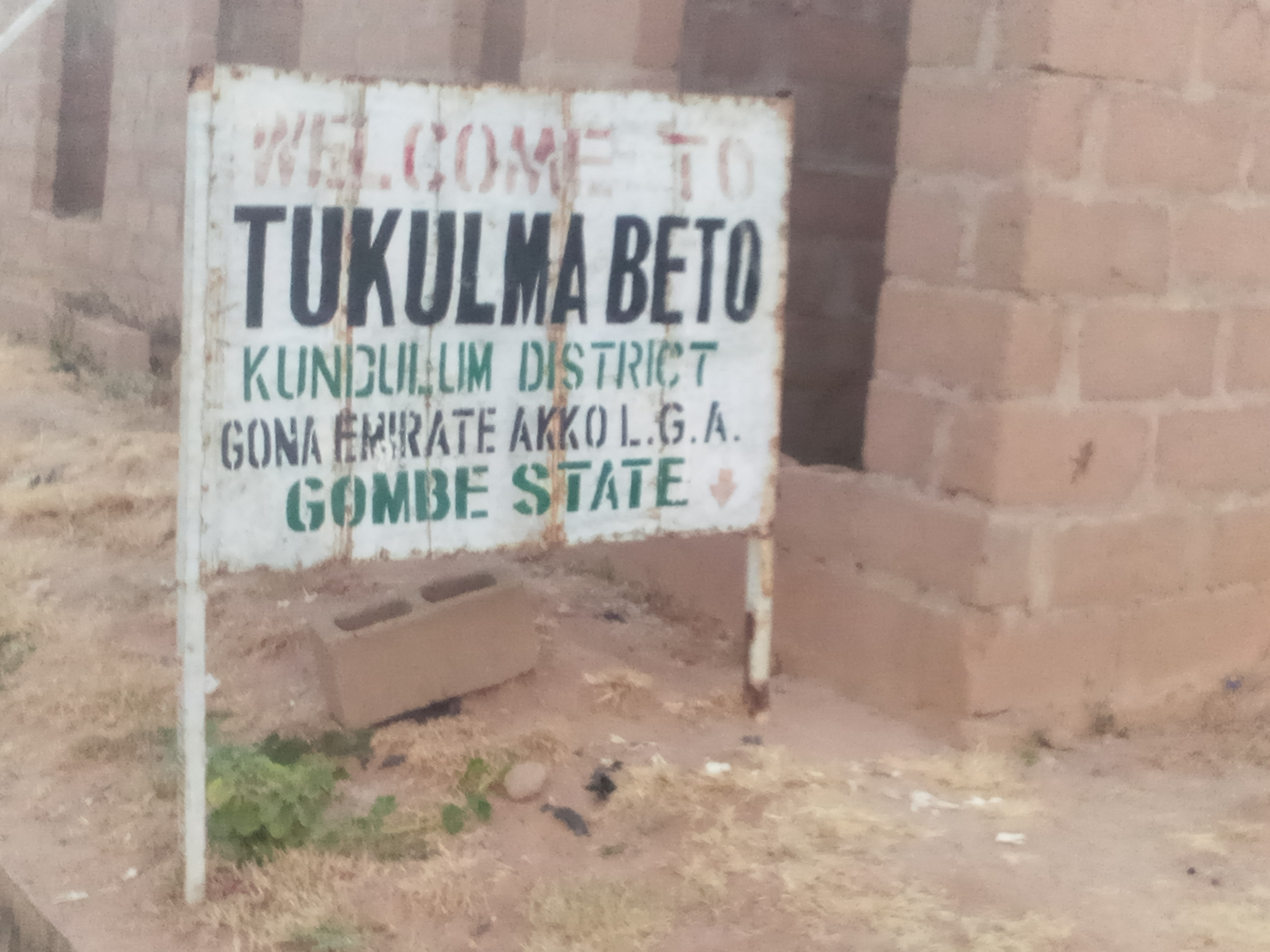
Tukulma Beto Community

Tukulma is a town located in Gombe State, Nigeria's Akko Local Government Area. About 27 kilometres or 17 miles, from Tukulma. The distance of about 400 kilometres (249 mi) separates Tukulma from Abuja, the capital of Nigeria.

The postcode of the area is 771104.

== School in Tukulma ==
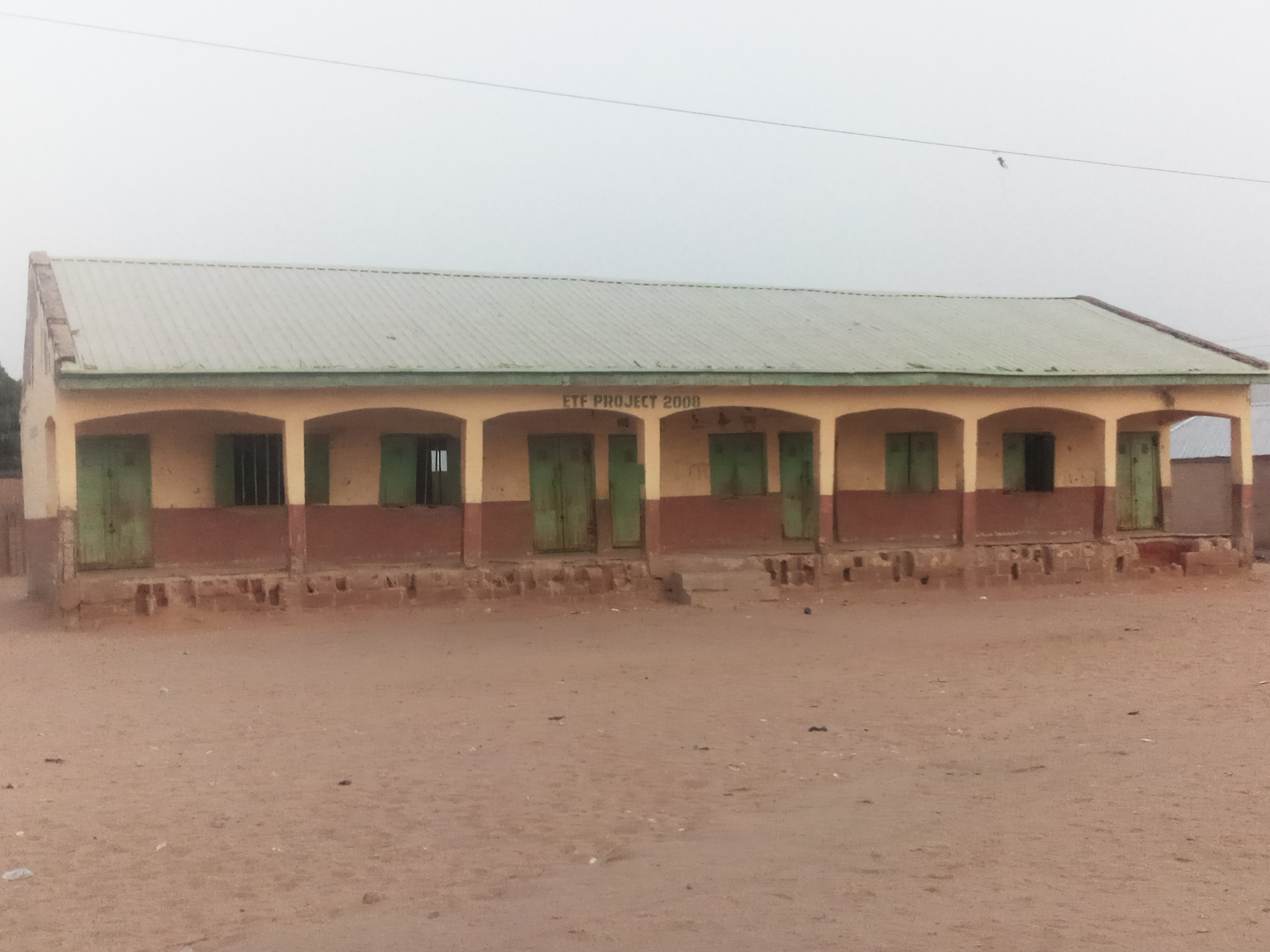
Tukulma Beto Primary School

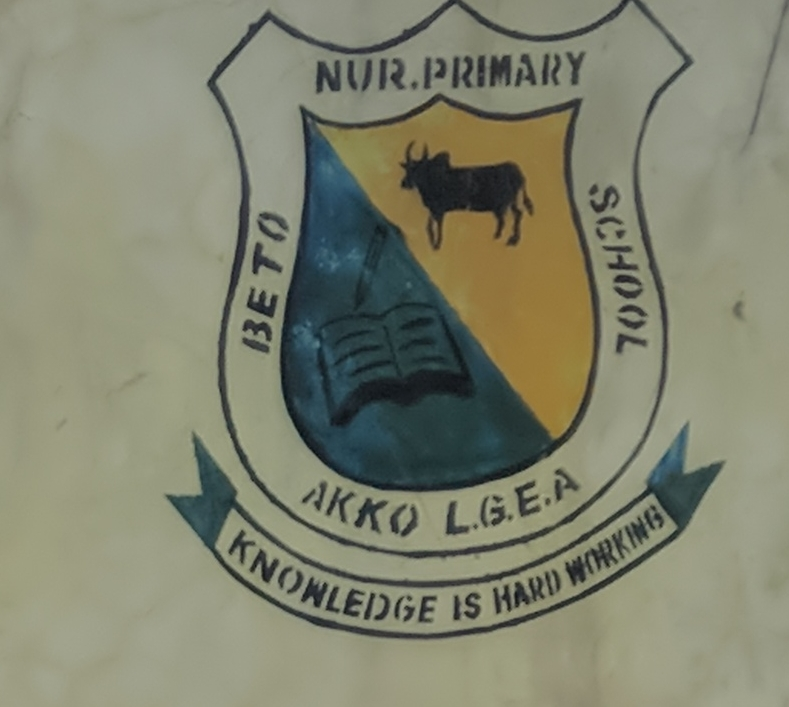
Tukulma Primary School Badge

Tukulma Primary School

Bappayo Tukulma Government Science Secondary School Gombe

== Climate ==
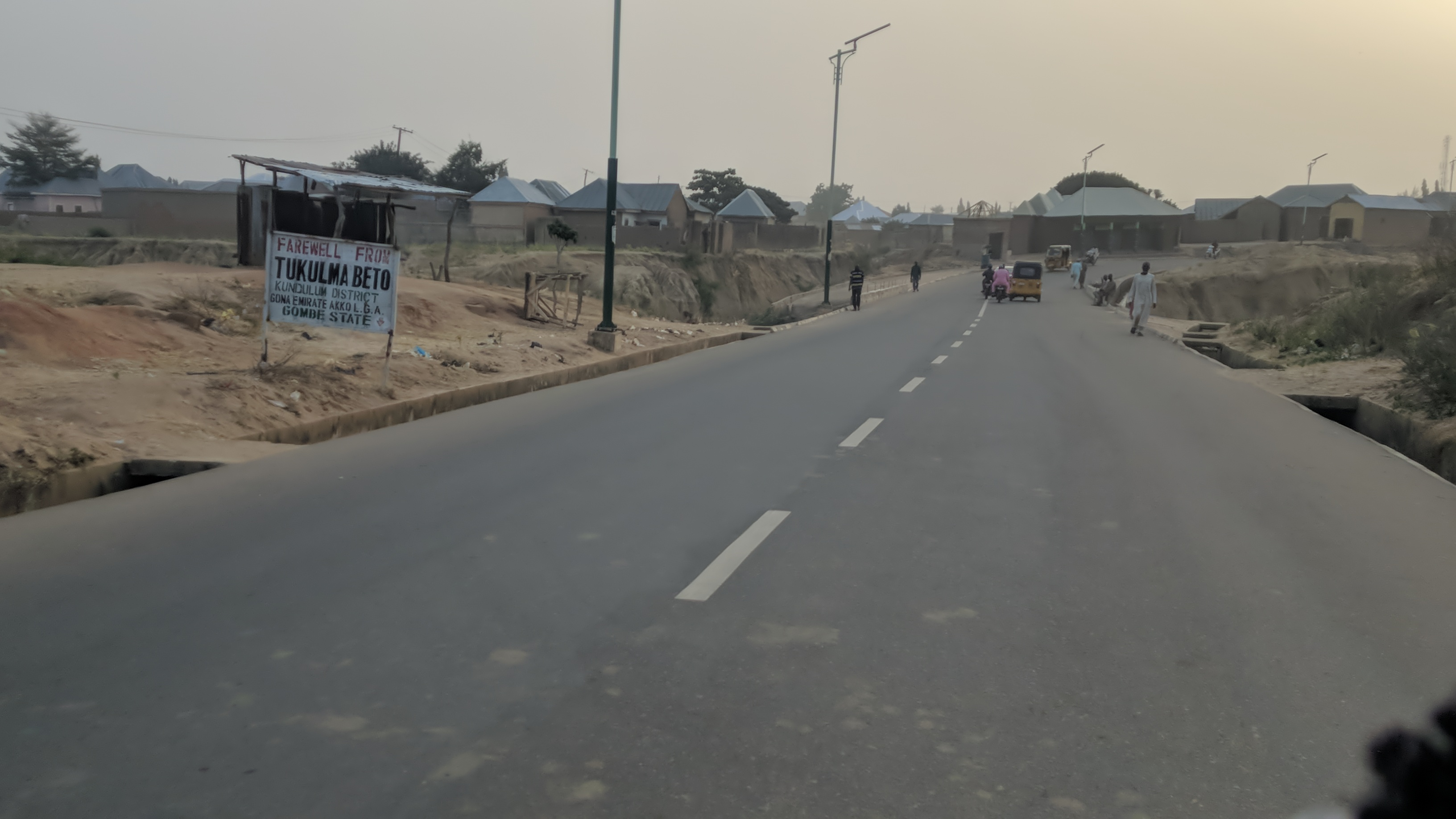
Iyaka, Tukulma district way, AKkko LGA, Gombe State

In Tukulma, the year-round heat is accompanied by an uncomfortable and overcast wet season and a partially cloudy dry season.
