= Gujuba, Nigeria =

Gujuba
- town
- Location in Nigeria
- Coordinates: 9°56′29″N 11°19′36″E
- Country: Nigeria
- State: Gombe State
- Headquarters: Akko

Government
  - Type: Democratic

Area
  - Total: 212.0 km^{2} (81.9 sq mi)

Population (2006 census)
  - Ethnicities: Fulani Tangale
  - Religions: mostly populated are Muslims and some few Christians
- Time zone: UTC+1 (WAT)

Gujuba is a town located in Gombe State, Nigeria's Akko Local Government Area. Gombe is roughly 42 kilometres or 26 miles from Gujuba. Gujuba and Abuja, the capital of Nigeria, are separated by around 432 kilometers (268 mi).

The postcode of the area is 117704.

== Healthcare ==
The Gujuba Primary Healthcare Centre was built in 1995 and remodeled in 2012. As of 2022, the centre had three Community Health Extension Workers, one Community Health Officer, and one midwife. A Premium Times report that same year found that the centre did not have adequate supplies, staff, or infrastructure to support its patients, and described it as "one of Nigeria’s worst" Primary Healthcare Centres.

== Climate ==
Gujuba has a consistent temperature, an unpleasant and cloudy wet season, and partially cloudy dry season.
