= Panda (town) =

- ward
- Location in Nigeria
- Coordinates: 9°59′08″N 11°26′45″E
- Country: Nigeria
- State: Gombe State
- LGA: Akko

Government
  - Type: Democratic

Area
  - Total: 466 km^{2} (180 sq mi)

Population (2006 census)
  - Ethnicities: Fulani Tangale
  - Religions: mostly populated are Muslims and some few Christians
- Time zone: UTC1 (WAT)

Panda is a settlement in the Akko Local Government Area, Gombe State, Nigeria. Panda and Gombe are almost 45 kilometres (28 miles) apart. Panda is 446 km (277 mi) away from Abuja, the Nigerian capital. The postcode of the area is 771102.

== Climate ==
In Panda, the dry season is partly cloudy, the wet season is oppressive and overcast, and the weather is hot all year round.
