= Shinga, Gombe State =

Town in Gombe state, Nigeria

Coordinates: 10°27′48″N 11°33′04″E

Shinga is a town in Gombe State of Nigeria. It lies at an elevation of 425 metres (1,394 feet) between the Bima Hills and the left (east) bank of the Gongola River.
