= Gamadadi =

- town
- Location in Nigeria
- Coordinates: 10°18′20″N 10°57′10″E
- Country: Nigeria
- State: Gombe State
- LGA: Akko

Government
  - Type: Democratic

Area
  - Total: 404 km^{2} (156 sq mi)

Population (2006 census)
  - Ethnicities: Fulani Tangale
  - Religions: mostly populated are Muslims and some few Christians
- Time zone: UTC+1 (WAT)

Gamadadi is a town located in Akko Local Government Area, Gombe State, Nigeria. Gamadadi is around 24 km / 15 mi away from Gombe's capital. About 404 kilometres or 251 miles, separate Gamadadi from Abuja, the capital of Nigeria.

The Postcode of the area is 771104.

== Climate ==
The weather in Gamadadi is steady, with partly cloudy skies throughout the parched, dry season and miserable, overcast wet season.
