= Tumu, Nigeria =

Tumu
- town
- Location in Nigeria
- Coordinates: 10°00′14″N 11°00′01″E
- Country: Nigeria
- State: Gombe State
- LGA: Akko

Government
  - Type: Democratic

Area
  - Total: 1,207 km^{2} (466 sq mi)

Population (2006 census)
  - Ethnicities: Fulani Tangale
  - Religions: mostly populated are Muslims and some few Christians
- Time zone: UTC1 (WAT)

Tumu is a town located in Gombe State, Nigeria's Akko Local Government Area. The distance between Gombe and Tumu is roughly 36 kilometres / 23 miles. The capital of Nigeria, Abuja, is located about 399 kilometres (248 miles) away from Tumu.

The postcode of the area is 771103.

== Climate ==
In Tumu, the weather is hot all year round, with a partly cloudy dry season and an unpleasant, overcast wet season.
