= List of colleges of education in Nigeria =

There are 205 accredited colleges of education and other NCE Certificate-Awarding institutions in Nigeria, consisting of 27 federal, 82 private, and 54 state colleges of education.

== Federal colleges ==
This is a list of approved federal colleges of education in Nigeria.

Institution	Location	Type	Host state	Year of establishment	Notes
Federal College of Education (Special), Oyo	Oyo	Federal	Oyo State	1977	
Adeyemi College of Education	Ondo	Federal	Ondo State	1964	
Federal College of Education, Iwo	Iwo	Federal	Osun State	2020	
Federal College of Education, Ididep	Ididep	Federal	Akwa Ibom State	2023	
Federal College of Education (Technical), Asaba	Asaba	Federal	Delta State	1987	
Federal College of Education, Abeokuta	Osiele-Abeokuta	Federal	Ogun State	1976	
Federal College of Education, Kano	Kano City	Federal	Kano State	1961	
Federal College of Education, Eha-Amufu	Eha-Amufu	Federal	Enugu State	1981	
Federal College of Education, Okene	Okene	Federal	Kogi State	1974	
Federal College of Education (Technical), Gombe	Gombe	Federal	Gombe State	1977	
Federal College of Education (Technical), Omoku	Omoku	Federal	Rivers State	1989	
Federal College of Education, Kontagora	Kontagora	Federal	Niger State	1958	
Federal College of Education, Zaria	Zaria	Federal	Kaduna State	1962	
Federal College of Education, Pankshin	Pankshin	Federal	Plateau State	1974	
Alvan Ikoku Federal College of Education	Owerri	Federal	Imo State	1963	
Federal College of Education, Yola	Yola	Federal	Adamawa State	1974	
Federal College of Education (Technical), Potiskum	Potiskum	Federal	Yobe State	1976	
Federal College of Education (Technical), Gusau	Gusau	Federal	Zamfara State	1990	
Federal College of Education (Technical), Akoka	Akoka	Federa	Lagos State	1967	
Federal College of Education, Katsina	Katsina	Federal	Katsina State	1976	
Federal College of Education (Technical), Bichi	Bichi	Federal	Kano State	1987	
Federal College of Education, Obudu.	Obudu	Federal	Cross River State	1983	
Federal College of Education (Technical), Umunze	Umunze	Federal	Anambra State	1989	

== Private colleges ==
This is a list of approved private colleges of education in Nigeria.

Institution	Location	Type	Host state	Year of establishment	Notes
Piaget College of Education.	Abeokuta	Private	Ogun State	2015	
St. Augustine College of Education	Akoka	Private	Lagos State	1971	
Our Saviour Institute of Science and Technology	Enugu	Private	Enugu State	1989	
Delar College of Education	Ibadan	Private	Oyo State	1990	
Yewa Central College of Education	Ayetoro	Private	Ogun State	2004	
Institute of Ecumenical Education, (Thinkers Corner), Enugu	Enugu	Private	Enugu State	190	
Ansar-Ud-Deen College of Education	Isolo	Private	Lagos State	1953	
African Thinkers Community of Inquiry College of Education.	Enugu	Private	Enugu State	1990	
City College of Education, Mararaba	Mararaba Gurku	Private	Nasarawa State		
Muftau Olanihun College of Education	Ibadan	Private	Oyo State	2003	
Havard Wilson College of Education	Aba	Private	Abia State	2001	
College of Education Ilemona.	Ilemona	Private	Kwara State	1987	
Nigerian Army School of Education (NASE), Ilorin	Ilorin	Federal	Kwara State	1970	
Nana Aishat Memorial College of Education.	Ilorin	Private	Kwara State	2009	
AJETUNMOBI College of Education Irra.	IRAA	Private	Kwara State	2022	

== State colleges ==
- Abia State College of Education (Technical)
- Adamawa State College of Education
- Adamu Augie College of Education
- Adamu Tafawa Balewa College of Education
- Adeniran Ogunsanya College of Education
- A.D. Rufa'i College of Education, Legal and General Studies
- Akwa Ibom State College of Education
- Aminu Saleh College of Education
- Bilyaminu Othman College of Education
- College of Education and Legal Studies, Nguru
- College Of Education, Akamkpa
- College of Education, Akwanga
- College of Education, Billiri
- College of Education, Ekiadolor
- College of Education, Gindiri
- College of Education, Katsina-Ala
- College Of Education, Lanlate
- College of Education, Oju
- College of Education, Waka-Biu
- College of Education, Warri
- Ebonyi State College of Education
- Enugu State College of Education (Technical)
- FCT College of Education
- Imo State College of Education
- Isa Kaita College of Education
- Jigawa State College of Education
- Jigawa State College of Education and Legal Studies
- Kano State College of Education and Preliminary Studies
- Kaduna State College of Education
- Kashim Ibrahim College of Education
- Kogi State College of Education, Ankpa
- Kogi State College of Education (Technical), Kabba
- Kwara State College of Education, Ilorin
- Kwara State College of Education (Technical), Lafiagi
- Kwara State College of Education, Oro
- Michael Otedola College of Primary Education
- Mohammed Goni College of Legal and Islamic Studies
- Moje College Of Education
- Niger State College of Education
- Nwafor Orizu College of Education
- Osun State College of Education, Ilesa
- Sa'adatu Rimi College of Education
- Shehu Shagari College of Education
- Umar Suleiman College of Education
- Yusuf Bala Usman College of Legal and General Studies
- Zamfara State College Of Education

== See also ==
- List of polytechnics in Nigeria
