= List of higher institutions in Gombe State =

The National Universities Commission (NUC) is the major accreditation and regulatory body that enforces uniform standard and sets admissions capacity of every university in Nigeria.National Universities Commission

The list comprises colleges, polytechnics, and universities owned by Federal Government, State Government and Private Individuals.

== Colleges ==
- Gombe State College of Legal Studies, Nafada.
- Gombe State College of Education, Billiri
- Federal College of Education(Technical), Gombe
- Federal College of Horticultural Technology, Dadin Kowa.
- Gombe State College of Nursing and Midwifery
- Umma College of Health Science and Technology
- JIBWIS College of Education.
- JIBWIS College of Arabic and Islamic Education.
- Abubakar Garba Zagada - Zagada College of Education.
- Fountain College of Health Sciences and Technology, Gombe
- Performance College of Health, Science and Technology, Billiri
- Garkuwa College of Health, Science and Technology Gombe
- Dukku International College of Health, Science and Technology
- Haruna Rasheed College of Health, Science and Technology, Dukku
- Ilimi College of Health Science and Technology, Gombe
- Gombe State College of Health Sciences and Technology, Kaltungo
- Lamido School of Hygiene, Liji
- Gombe city college of science and technology, Gombe.

== Polytechnics ==
- Federal Polytechnic, Kaltungo
- Gombe State Polytechnic Bajoga

== University ==
- Federal University Kashere
- Gombe State University
- Gombe State University Of Science & Technology
- North-Eastern University
- National Open University of Nigeria
- Jewel University
