= Banknotes of the Nigerian naira =

Nigerian naira notes are the banknotes of Nigeria, issued as part of the Nigerian naira (NGN), which is subdivided into 100 kobo. The Central Bank of Nigeria (CBN) is the sole authority responsible for issuing legal tender in the country.

== History ==
The naira was introduced on 1 January 1973, replacing the Nigerian pound. The Central Bank of Nigeria has since overseen the issuance and regulation of naira notes. Early series included national symbols and portraits of political leaders. At its introduction, one Nigerian pound was exchanged for two naira, with the new currency divided into 100 kobo.

== Coins versus notes ==
One hundred kobo is equivalent to one Naira (similar to one hundred cents equaling a dollar). The kobo were generally minted as coins, with the notable exception of the 50-Kobo note. Over time, the 50-Kobo and the 1-Naira notes were converted to coins, and a 2-Naira coin was introduced.

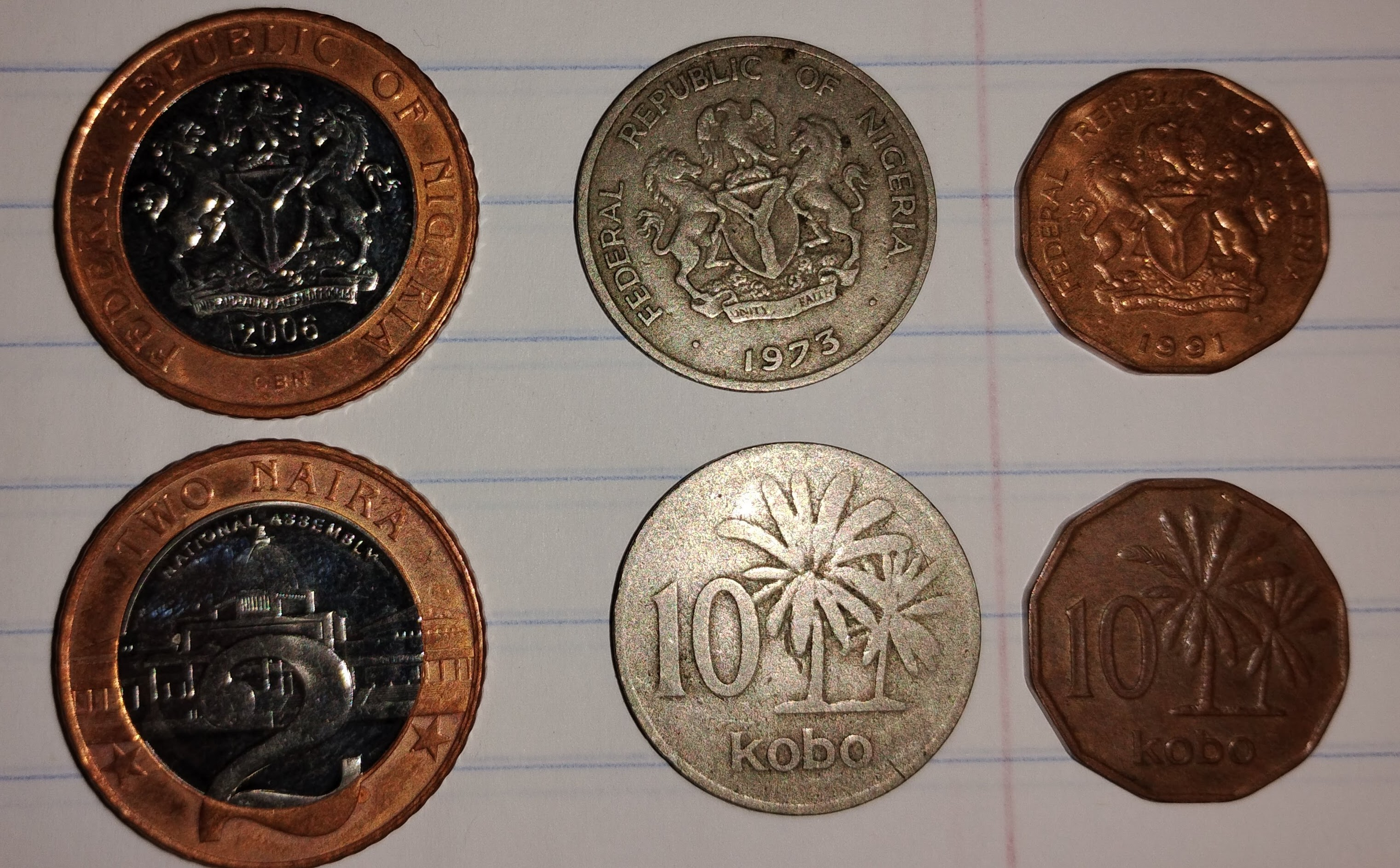
nigerian naria and kobo coins

However, as the purchasing value of the Nigerian currency has fallen over the years, the kobo is no longer commonly encountered, thus coins are hard to come by. Likewise, the lower naira denominations are not often seen as they have become impractical for most purchases.

== Naira denominations ==
The naira is issued in several denominations, each with distinct designs and portraits of Nigerians of historical or cultural significance. As of 2023, the following notes are in circulation:

=== ₦5 ===
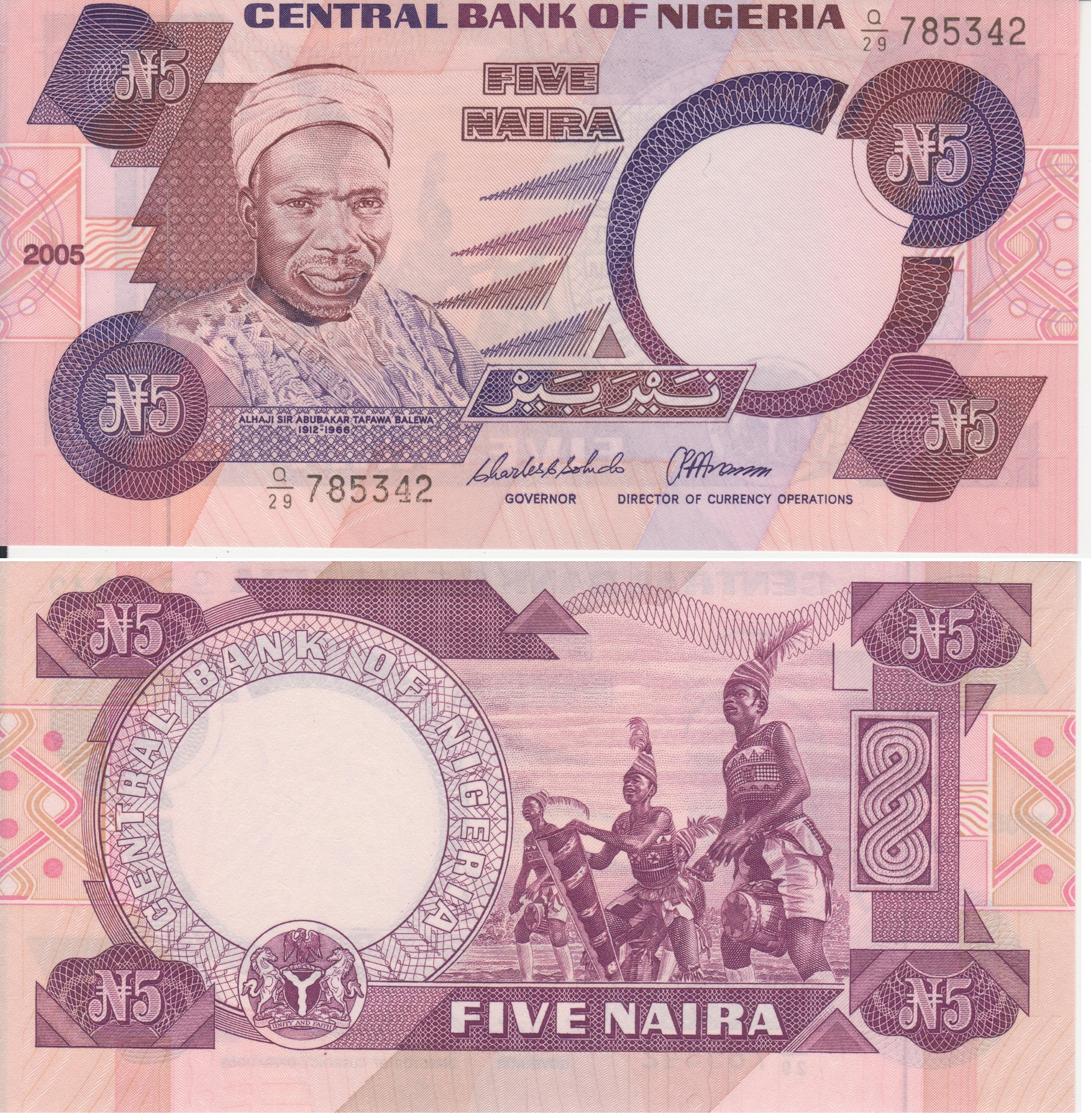
Five naira note

The ₦5 note depicts Sir Abubakar Tafawa Balewa, Nigeria's first prime minister. The reverse shows three Yoruba drummers.

=== ₦10 ===
The ₦10 note features Alvan Ikoku, noted for his contributions to Nigerian education. The reverse depicts two women carrying calabashes, representing northern cultural practices.

=== ₦20 ===
The ₦20 note portrays Murtala Muhammed, head of state from 1975 to 1976. The reverse features Ladi Kwali, a Nigerian potter.

=== ₦50 ===
The ₦50 note shows four figures in traditional attire, representing Nigeria's cultural diversity. The reverse depicts fishermen at work.

=== ₦100 ===
The ₦100 note, introduced in 1999, depicts Obafemi Awolowo. The reverse depicts Zuma Rock.

=== ₦200 ===
The ₦200 note features Sir Ahmadu Bello, the Sardauna of Sokoto. The reverse depicts agricultural produce and livestock.

=== ₦500 ===
The ₦500 note portrays Nnamdi Azikiwe, Nigeria's first president. The reverse shows an offshore oil rig.

=== ₦1000 ===
The ₦1000 note depicts Aliyu Mai-Bornu and Clement Isong, the first two indigenous governors of the Central Bank of Nigeria. The reverse shows the CBN headquarters in Abuja.

== Design and security features ==
Naira notes incorporate portraits, cultural motifs, and national landmarks. Security features include holographic strips, watermarks, and microprinting, which are updated periodically to deter counterfeiting.

=== Redesigns ===
In 2022, the ₦200, ₦500, and ₦1000 notes were redesigned by the Central Bank of Nigeria.

== Abuse of the naira ==
Abuse of the naira refers to practices such as defacing, mutilating, or misusing banknotes. Common forms include spraying notes at social events, using them for decoration, or deliberately damaging them. The Central Bank of Nigeria considers such acts offences, citing increased replacement costs and reduced confidence in the currency. Measures against abuse include public education, penalties, and promotion of digital payments.

In April 2024, Nigerian social media personality Bobrisky was arrested by the Economic and Financial Crimes Commission (EFCC) for defacing naira notes at a public event. She pleaded guilty to four counts of currency abuse and was sentenced to six months in prison without the option of a fine.

Later in 2024, the CBN fined several banks for releasing newly printed notes to street vendors, part of efforts to curb currency abuse and ensure proper distribution channels.

== See also ==
- Nigerian Naira
- Central Bank of Nigeria
