= Nigerian one-hundred-naira note =

Denomination of Nigerian currency

One Hundred Naira
- Country: Nigeria
- Value: ₦ 100 naira
- Width: 151 mm
- Height: 78 mm
- Security features: Security thread, watermark, color shifting ink, embossed portrait, embossed lettering, embossed denominational numerals
- Years of printing: 1999 – present

Obverse
- Design: Obafemi Awolowo (old & new), palm fruit (new), cotton (new)

Reverse
- Design: Zuma Rock (old), traditionally dressed people (new)

The Nigerian one hundred-naira bill (₦100) is a denomination of Nigerian currency. The first Nigerian note with this value was issued in December 1999 and the Centenary version was launched in 2014. Obafemi Awolowo, a nationalist and statesman who played a key role in Nigeria's independence movement, has been featured on the obverse of the bill since 1999. An image of Zuma Rock in Niger State once appeared on the reverse of the banknote, but was replaced by a group of traditionally dressed people in the Centenary note issued on 19 December 2014. The bills are also commonly referred to as "10 faiba," "Awo," in reference to the use of Awolowo's portrait on the denomination.
