= Ernest Emenyonu =

Nigerian academic

- Born: Ernest Nneji Emenyonu; Imo State, Nigeria
- Occupations: African literature critic and professor

Chief Sir Ernest Emenyonu is a Nigerian academic, who is an African literature critic and professor. He was formerly head of the department of English and Literary Studies, Dean of the Faculty of Arts, and Deputy Vice-Chancellor of the University of Calabar, in that order, through the 1980s and 1990s. He was also Provost of Alvan Ikoku College of Education, now Alvan Ikoku Federal College of Education, Owerri, in Imo state, Nigeria (1992–1995).

Ernest Nneji Emenyonu is one of the preeminent scholars in the world on African Literature. He has published biographies on notable writers such as Chinua Achebe and Cyprian Ekwensi. He is also the author of The Rise of the Igbo Novel While at the University of Calabar, Emenyonu founded and chaired the Calabar annual International Conference on African Literature and the English Language (ICALEL). This promoted interaction of African writers and critics with visiting international scholars.

Emenyonu is a research professor at University of Michigan. He held the position of Head of Department of Africana Studies. Presently, he is the Editor of the oldest journal in the world on African literature, African Literature Today. He has made notable contributions to the University of Michigan-Flint, such as bringing Nobel Prize-winner in Literature Wole Soyinka, to the campus, as well as women's rights activist Nawal El Saadawi.

Emenyonu is a Knight of Saint Christopher, Anglican Communion. He is also a Chief in his hometown of Imo State, Nigeria. He was given the title Ugwu Mba 1 of Mbieri, meaning in translation "pride of his people". He is married to his longtime wife Patricia Emenyonu, with four children and three granddaughters.

== Bibliography ==
- "Introduction", Goatskin Bags and Wisdom: New Critical Perspectives on African Literature, Trenton: AWP 2000. ISBN 0-86543-670-3 (hb) ISBN 0-86543-671-1 (pb)
- Tales of our Motherland, Ibadan: Heinemann Educational Books, 1999.
- The rise of the Igbo novel, Oxford University Press, 1978 ISBN 978-154-023-0, ISBN 0-19-575447-6
- (Editor) New Women's Writing in African Literature, Department of Africana Studies, University of Michigan-Flint
- Literature and society: selected essays on African literature, Oguta, Nigeria: Zim Pan African Publishers, 1986
- (Editor) A Companion to Chimamanda Ngozi Adichie, James Currey/Boydell and Brewer, 2017, ISBN 978-1847011633
