= Moje =

Moje may refer to:

== People ==
- Dick Moje, American American football player
- Klaus Moje (1936–2016), German-Australian glass artist
- Moje Forbach (1898–1993), German operatic soprano and actress
- Moje Menhardt (born 1934), Austrian painter
- Moje Östberg (1897–1984), Swedish naval officer

== Other ==
- Moje 3, a Serbian girl group
- Moje College Of Education, Nigeria
