= Nigerian two-hundred-naira note =

Denomination of Nigerian currency

Two Hundred Naira
- Country: Nigeria
- Value: ₦200 naira
- Width: 151 mm
- Height: 78 mm
- Security features: Security thread, watermark, color shifting ink, embossed portrait, embossed lettering, embossed denominational numerals
- Years of printing: 1 November 2000 – present

Obverse
- Design: Ahmadu Bello

Reverse
- Design: pyramid of agricultural commodity, livestock farming, the National Coat of Arms, yellow trumpet flowers, and the denomination

The Nigerian two hundred-naira bill (₦200) is a denomination of Nigerian currency. The first Nigerian note with this value was issued in November 2000.

Sardauna of Sokoto Ahmadu Bello has been featured on the obverse of the bill since 2000. On the reverse of the banknote is a pyramid of agricultural commodity, livestock farming, the National Coat of Arms, yellow trumpet flowers, and the denomination. The bills are also commonly referred to as 20 faiba, indicating that it is ₦10 in 20 places.

== Redesign ==
On 23 October 2022, the governor of the Central Bank of Nigeria, Godwin Emefiele announced that the ₦200, ₦500, and ₦1000 notes would be redesigned to reduce counterfeiting and corruption. The new notes were unveiled on 23 November 2022. No changes were made on the existing features, only the overall colour of the note was changed. President Muhammadu Buhari said that the old 200 notes could be used till 10 April 2023. The notes are still in use.
