= Nigerian five-hundred-naira note =

Denomination of Nigerian currency

Five hundred Naira
- Country: Nigeria
- Value: 500 naira
- Width: 151 mm
- Height: 78 mm
- Years of printing: 2001-2022 (first issue) 2022-present(second issue)

Obverse
- Design: Nnamdi Azikiwe

Reverse
- Design: Off-shore oil rig

The five hundred naira Nigerian note is a denomination of Nigerian currency. It was introduced in April 2001, and it was the highest currency in Nigeria when it was introduced until the 1000 naira was introduced.

The obverse of the note features a portrait of Nnamdi Azikiwe. The reverse features an off-shore oil rig and the Coat of arms of Nigeria.

The original 2001 series of the ₦500 note was scheduled to cease being legal tender on 10 February 2023 as part of the Central Bank of Nigeria's currency redesign programme and was replaced by a redesigned predominantly green version introduced in December 2022. Following a Supreme Court ruling, both the old and redesigned ₦500 notes continued to circulate as legal tender.

Security features of the ₦500 banknote include a portrait watermark, a windowed security thread, colour-changing ink, latent images visible when the note is tilted, and raised intaglio printing.
