= FCT College of Education =

College of Education in Nigeria

- Type: Public
- Established: 1996
- Provost: Mohammed Gambo Hamza
- Location: Zuba, Federal Capital Territory, Nigeria; 9°05′04″N 7°12′28″E
- Affiliations: Ahmadu Bello University

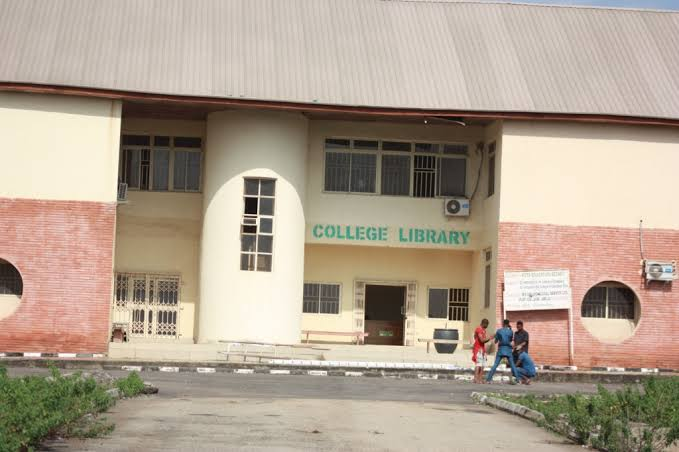

The FCT College of Education is a state government owned institution of higher education located in Zuba, Federal Capital Territory, Nigeria. The current Provost is Mohammed Gambo Hamza.

== History ==
The FCT College of Education was established in 1996. It was formerly known as Teachers College, Zuba.

== Courses ==
The institution offers the following courses;

- Biology Education
- Christian Religious Studies
- Hausa
- Agricultural Science
- Economics
- Education and Mathematics
- Education and Geography
- Education and Arabic
- Islamic Studies
- Mathematics/Physics
- Social Studies
- Integrated Science
- Business Education
- English
- Computer Education
- Chemistry Education
- Geography
- Home Economics and Education
- Education and Social Studies
- Fine And Applied Arts
- Early Childhood and Care Education
- Physical And Health Education
- Igbo
- French
- Human Kinetics and Health Education
- Education and Islamic Studies
