= Federal College of Education, Zaria =

College in Zaria, Nigeria

Coordinates: 11.084°N 7.732°E

Federal University of Education, Zaria
- Motto: To train teachers for the service of the dynamic society through renewed research.
- Type: Public
- Established: 1962
- Affiliations: Ahmadu Bello University and Usmanu Danfodiyo University
- Provost: Prof. Yahaya Isa Bunkure
- Location: Zaria, Kaduna State, Nigeria
- Website: fuez.edu.ng

Federal College of Education, Zaria now Federal University of Education, Zaria, was a college of science and art in Zaria, Nigeria. It was established by the then Northern Region Government of Nigeria in November 1962. It was initially named Northern Secondary Teachers College and later known as Advanced Teachers' College Zaria, under the administrative and policy control of Ahmadu Bello University Zaria, until 1991. The institution was initially located at the present site of Nuhu Bamalli Polytechnic (Annex) before it was moved to Gyallesu, opposite Ahmadu Bello University, Kongo Campus - Zaria in 1973. It was later disarticulated from ABU, Zaria and renamed Federal College of Education, Zaria.

== Operations ==
In May 2015, the institution was converted into a university, along with several other colleges in the country, by the PDP government of Goodluck Jonathan. However, in August of the same year, the APC government reversed the conversion, restoring its former status as the Federal College of Education, Zaria, along with the others.

In May 2023, the APC-led government of Muhammadu Buhari initiated the process of formalizing the college's upgrade to university status. However, the process was not completed until September 2024, when a new government, led by Bola Tinubu, finalized the upgrade.

Following the expiration of Dr. Abdullahi Ango Ladan's tenure in February 2021, Dr. Suleiman Balarabe, was appointed vice chancellor and provost.

== Offerings ==
The college library contains journals, books, and internet connectivity for staff and students. The College of Education is affiliated to the Ahmadu Bello University Zaria (ABU) and Usman Dan Fodio University Sokoto (UDUS).

The courses offered by the institution are:

=== School of Arts & Social Sciences ===
- Christian Religious Studies (NCE & ABU Degree)
- Geography (NCE & ABU Degree)
- Islamic Religious Studies (NCE & ABU Degree)
- Social Studies (NCE & ABU Degree)
- Economics (NCE & UDUS Degree)
- Cultural and Creative Art
- Theatre Art
- Political Science

=== School of Education ===
- General Studies in Education
- Pre-NCE & Remedial Studies
- Curriculum and Instruction
- Foundation of Education
- Educational Psychology
- Educational Administration and Planning (ABU Degree)
- Library and Information Science (ABU Degree)
- Guidance and Counselling (UDUS Degree)

=== School of Languages ===
- Arabic (NCE & ABU Degree)
- English (NCE & ABU Degree)
- French
- Yoruba
- Hausa (NCE & ABU Degree)
- Igbo

=== School of Sciences ===
- Biology (NCE & ABU Degree)
- Computer Science (NCE & UDUS Degree)
- Chemistry (NCE & ABU Degree)
- Integrated Science (NCE & ABU Degree)
- Mathematics (NCE & ABU Degree)
- Physical & Health Education(PHE) (NCE & ABU Degree)
- Physics

=== School of Vocational and Technical education ===
- Agric Education (NCE & ABU Degree)
- Business Education (NCE & ABU Degree)
- Home Economics (NCE & ABU Degree)

=== School of Early Child Care and Primary education ===
- Primary Education (NCE & UDUS Degree)

=== School of Special education ===
- Adult and Non-Formal Education (NCE & UDUS Degree)
- Special and Non-Formal Education

== See also ==
- List of colleges of education in Nigeria
