= Nigerian one-thousand-naira note =

Denomination of Nigerian currency

One Thousand Naira
- Country: Nigeria
- Value: Naira
- Years of printing: October 2005 – present

Nigerian One Thousand Naira Note ( ₦1000 or NGN1000) is a denomination of the Nigerian currency. The one thousand naira note was introduced in October 2005. It is currently the highest Naira denomination.

On 12 October 2005, Olusegun Obasanjo launched the ₦1000 note. A redesign, really just a color scheme change, was introduced in late 2022 which resulted in some cash scarcity and hardship for citizens.
