= Federal College of Education (Technical), Akoka =

Post-secondary school in Akoka, Nigeria

- Motto: Knowledge, Skill and Service
- Type: Public
- Established: 1967
- Affiliations: Federal University of Technology, Minna
- Provost: Dr Wahab Ademola Azeez
- Location: Akoka, Yaba, Lagos State, Nigeria; 6.5225°N 3.3841°E
- Website: Official website

The Federal College of Education (Technical), Akoka (formerly National Technical Teachers College) is a Nigerian technical tertiary institution located in Akoka, a suburb of Yaba in Lagos. Founded in 1967 by the Federal Government of Nigeria, the institution was founded with the aim of "grooming and producing teachers in technical, vocational and commercial academic disciplines". The Federal College of Education (Technical), Akoka is approved by the National Universities Commission and offers the award of Nigeria Certificate in Education (NCE) and undergraduate first degree courses in technology education, having affiliated to the Federal University of Technology, Minna.

== Courses ==
The following courses are offered by the College of Education;

- Agricultural Science
- Agricultural Science and Education
- Automobile Technology Education
- Biology/Integrated Science
- Building Education
- Business Education
- Chemistry/Integrated Science
- Computer Education/Physics
- Computer Education/Chemistry
- Computer Science Education/Integrated Science
- Computer Science Education/Mathematics
- Social science

The institution also participates in the SIWES programme where students are attached to practitioners in the industry to gain practical experience.

== Affiliation ==
The institution is affiliated with the University of Benin, Benin City for offering bachelor's degree programmes in the following areas:

Department of Vocational and Technical Education

- Agriculture Education
- Business Education
- Home Economics Education
- Technical Education with options in;

- Automobile Technology Education

- Building/Woodwork Technology Education

- Metal Work Technology Education

- Electrical/Electronics Technology Education

Department of Curriculum and Instructional Technology

- Biology Education
- Chemistry Education
- Computer Science Education
- Mathematics Education
- Physics Education
- Integrated Science Education
- Educational Technology Education

Department of Educational Foundation

- Fine and Applied Arts Education

The institution is affiliated with federal University of Technology, Minna.

== Notable alumni ==
- Adetunwase Adenle
- Ude Oko Chukwu

== See also ==
- List of colleges of education in Nigeria
- National Commission for Colleges of Education
