= Adetunwase Adenle =

Nigerian art educator

- Born: Adetunwase Akanni Adenle
- Education: Federal College of Education (Technical), Akoka
- Occupation: Art educator
- Known for: Guinness World Records
- Website: https://www.adetunwase.com/

Adetunwase Adenle is a Nigerian art educator, artist and a former holder of Guinness World Records. He is the co-founder of Slum Art Foundation, and of Ecole de Dessin School of Art.

== Education ==
Adetunwase studied Fine and Applied Art at the Federal College of Education (Technical) Akoka, Lagos.

== Achievements ==
Adetunwase once held the record for the most children reading aloud with an adult at a single location. The record was set by Adetunwase Adenle, Adejoke Orelope-Adefulire and the Ecole De Dessin alongside 4,222 children in Oregun, Ikeja, Lagos, Nigeria on 8 September 2011 in commemoration of the International Literacy Day. The aim for the feat was to encourage reading among young children. This record was surpassed when 4,695 children read aloud with an Aamer Naeem and Salma Patel at the Bhimber Stadium, Azad Kashmir, Pakistan on 28 April 2013.

Adetunwase also once held the record was for the world's largest special stamp, which measured 2.448 m^{2} (26 ft^{2} 50 in^{2}). Adenle and his School of Art created the stamp at Top Laurel School in Lagos on 17 November 2016. The project was to commemorate the 50th anniversary of the creation of Lagos State. The record was beaten by The Walt Disney Company Italy in Lucca, Italy on 30 October 2019 which painted a large special stamp measuring 4.11 m^{2} (44 ft^{2} 34 in^{2}) to celebrate the 85th anniversary of Donald Duck's birth. The current holder of the record is Saudi Post with its special stamp which measures 5.95 m^{2} (64 ft^{2} 7 in^{2}). The record was achieved in Riyadh, Kingdom of Saudi Arabia on 14 February 2022.

Adetunwase's Ecole De Dessin facilitated and still currently holds the Guinness World Record for the highest number of people washing their hands at the same time. 37,809 schoolchildren were brought together to set the record at an event organized by Unilever Nigeria Lifebuoy Team and the Federal Government of Nigeria at Tafawa Balewa Square, Onikan in Lagos, Nigeria on 14 October 2011. The intent was to teach children good hand hygiene as a way to defeat diarrhea.

Adetunwase's Ecole De Dessin also once held the record for the largest painting painted by the highest number of people. The painting, which measured 3,130.55 m^{2} (63.5 meters x 49.3 meters, or 33,696 ft^{2} 138.2 in^{2}) was completed on 10 October 2020, by the Ecole de Dessin in Lagos State as part of the Nigeria at 50 celebration. The painting was created by 350 volunteers. It depicted, among others, the Nigerian Flag painted around the country's map. It was unveiled by Ecole de Dessin in partnership with the Lagos State Government on 17 November 2010 in celebration of Guinness World Records Day 2010. The painting was created to celebrate Nigeria's 50th Independence anniversary. It was also intended to draw awareness to issues of climate change in Nigeria, while teaching less privileged kids how to draw and paint. The record has since been overturned at the Punjab Youth Festival in Lahore, Punjab, Pakistan on 14 March 2013 when 1,557 participants contributed to a painting measuring 3,717 m^{2} (40,009.29 ft^{2}) over 6 hours.
