= Calabar International Conference on African Literature and the English Language =

ICALEL is an acronym for the Calabar International Conference on African Literature and the English Language founded and chaired by African scholar and critic Ernest Emenyonu. At the centre of the conference are African writers and critics from all over the world. The first conference entitled “The Woman as a Writer in Africa” was held at the University of Calabar auditorium in May 1981 and Ghanaian writer Ama Ata Aidoo was a keynote speaker. The themes of 1982, namely "Literature in African Languages" and "Writing Books for Children", featured Ngũgĩ wa Thiong'o and Bessie Head as keynote speakers. The many notable African writers who have featured at the conference over the years include Cyprian Ekwensi, Chinua Achebe, Wole Soyinka, Chinweizu, Dennis Brutus, Buchi Emecheta, Flora Nwapa, Elechi Amadi, Ken Saro Wiwa, Chukwuemeka Ike, Nuruddin Farah, Syl Cheney-Coker, to mention a few.
