= Nigerian fifty-naira note =

Denomination of Nigerian currency

Fifty Naira
- Country: Nigeria
- Value: naira
- Years of printing: October 1991– present

The Nigerian fifty-naira note (₦ 50 or NGN 50) is a denomination of the Nigerian currency. When the note was introduced in October of 1991, it was the banknote with the highest denomination in Nigeria at the time. The front of the note features four portraits of ordinary Nigerians: three men representing the major ethnic groups (Hausa, Igbo, and Yoruba) and a woman symbolising the Middle Belt. While the back features a depiction of three fishermen at work, symbolizing Nigeria's agriculture and industry, often with a catch of fish, representing hard work and economic activity, in rural areas.

The bill is commonly referred to as "wa zo bia" in reference to the losse translation of "come" in the major ethnic groups languages.
