= Nigerian naira =

Currency of Nigeria

ISO 4217
- Code: NGN (numeric: 566)
- Subunit: 0.01

Units of account
- Plural: naira
- Symbol: ₦
- Subunit
- ^{1}/_{100}: kobo
- Plural
- kobo: kobo

Denominations
- Banknotes: ₦5, ₦10, ₦20, ₦50, ₦100, ₦200, ₦500, ₦1000
- Coins: 50 kobo, ₦1, ₦2

Demographics
- Date of introduction: 1 January 1973
- Replaced: Nigerian pound
- User(s): Nigeria

Issuance
- Central bank: Central Bank of Nigeria
- Website: www.cenbank.org
- Printer: Nigerian Security Printing and Minting Company Limited
- Website: www.mintnigeria.com
- Mint: Nigerian Security Printing and Minting Company Limited
- Website: www.mintnigeria.com

Valuation
- Inflation: 15.9%
- Source: June 2026

The naira (sign: ₦; code: NGN; Yoruba: náírà, Hausa: نَيْرَ, romanized: naira, Igbo: naịra, Tyap: nera) is the currency of Nigeria. One naira is divided into 100 kobo.

The Central Bank of Nigeria (CBN) is the sole issuer of legal tender money throughout the Federal Republic of Nigeria. It controls the volume of money supplied in the economy to ensure monetary and price stability. The Currency Operations Department of the CBN is in charge of currency management, through the designs, procurement, distribution and supply, processing, and reissue and disposal or disintegration of bank notes and coins.

A major cash crunch occurred in February 2023 when the Nigerian government used a currency note changeover—delivering too few of the new notes into circulation—to attempt to force citizens to use a newly created, government-sponsored central bank digital currency. This led to extensive street protests.

== History ==
The naira was introduced on 1 January 1973, replacing the Nigerian pound at a rate of £1 = ₦2. The coins of the new currency were the first coins issued by an independent Nigeria, as all circulating coins of the Nigerian pound were all struck by the colonial government of the Federation of Nigeria in 1959, with the name of Queen Elizabeth II on the obverse. This also made Nigeria the last country in the world to abandon the £sd currency system in favour of a decimal currency system. The government planned to redenominate the naira at 100:1 in 2008, but the plan was suspended. The currency sign is U+20A6 ₦ NAIRA SIGN.

The name "naira" was coined from the word "Nigeria" by Obafemi Awolowo. However, naira as a currency was launched by Shehu Shagari as minister of finance in 1973.

The naira was pegged to the US$ between 1993 and 1998.

The Central Bank of Nigeria claimed that it attempted to control the annual inflation rate below 10%. In 2011, the CBN increased key interest rate six times, rising from 6.25% to 12%. On 31 January 2012, the CBN decided to maintain the key interest rate at 12% to reduce the impact of inflation due to a reduction in fuel subsidies.

From 20 June 2016, the naira was allowed to float, after being pegged at ₦197 to US$1 for more than a year (since March 2015). Trade speculated the natural range of the naira would be between ₦280 and ₦350 to the dollar.

In October 2021, the eNaira, the digital version of the state currency, was officially launched by President Muhammadu Buhari.

The 2023 Nigerian currency crisis was precipitated in January 2023 by a shortage of naira cash amid an attempt by the Nigerian government to force citizens to use newly designed notes, which the government said would help stem the tide of vote-buying in the lead-up to the 2023 general elections. This led to extensive street protests throughout January and February 2023. The country's Supreme Court later invalidated the government's pronouncement that the previous notes had ceased to become legal tender.

On 14 June 2023, the naira fell 23% in a day, to a rate of ₦600 to US$1, as the central bank abandoned its currency peg (that started in 2017) and allowed the naira to trade freely. On 19 July 2023, the Naira fell to a new record low of ₦853 to US$1.

Between 1 February 2024 and 5 February 2024, the currency fell again, more than 50%, from NGN 898 to NGN 1,400, before drifting down to NGN 1,600 as of 30 July 2024.

=== Coins ===
Nigerian central bank information as of 2022 is in this source:

In 1973, coins were introduced in denominations of 1/2, 1, 5, 10 and 25 kobo, with the 1/2 and 1 kobo in bronze and the higher denominations in cupronickel. The 1/2 kobo coins were minted only that year. In 1991, smaller 1-, 10-, and 25-kobo coins were issued in copper-plated steel, along with nickel-plated steel 50-kobo and ₦1. On 28 February 2007, new coins were issued in denominations of 50 kobo, ₦1 and ₦2, with the ₦1 and ₦2 bimetallic. Some Nigerians expressed concerns over the usability of the ₦2 coin. The deadline for exchanging the old currency was set at 31 May 2007. The central bank stated that the 1/2 to 25 kobo coins were withdrawn from circulation with effect from 28 February 2007. The 2006-dated coin series comprises 50 kobo, ₦1 and ₦2 pieces, with Herbert Macaulay depicted on the ₦1 coin and the National Assembly building on the ₦2 coin.

- 1/2 kobo
- 1 kobo
- 5 kobo
- 10 kobo
- 25 kobo
- 50 kobo
- 1 naira
- 2 naira

=== Banknotes of Nigeria ===
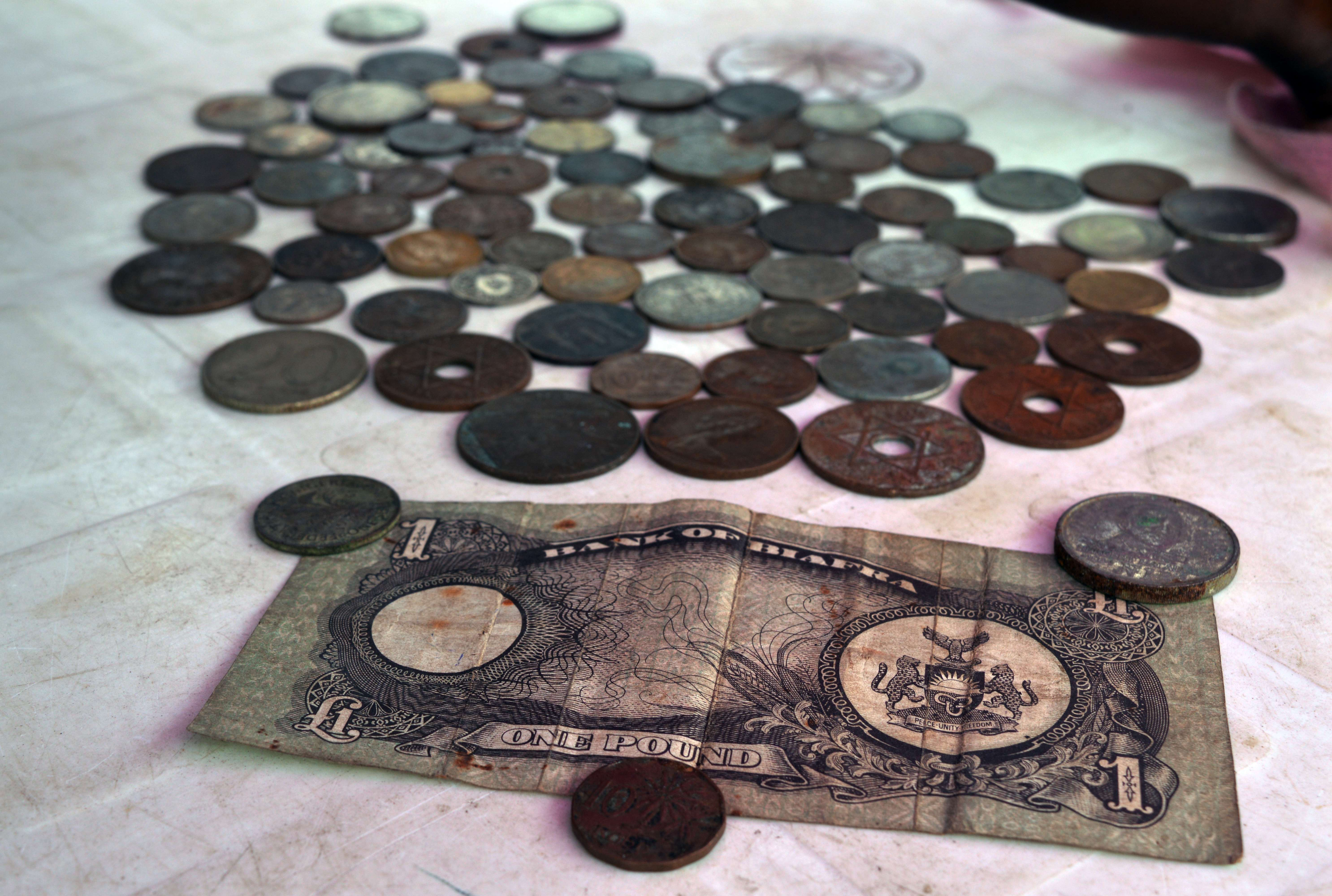
Old Nigerian currency

On 1 January 1973, the Central Bank of Nigeria introduced notes for 50 kobo, ₦1, ₦5, ₦10 and ₦20 (the £1 note did not continue as a ₦2 note): in April 1984, the colors of all naira banknotes were changed in an attempt to control money laundering. In 1991, ₦50 notes were issued, while the 50 kobo and ₦1 notes were replaced by coins in 1991. This was followed by ₦100 in 1999, ₦200 in 2000, ₦500 in 2001 and ₦1,000 on 12 October 2005.

On 28 February 2007, new versions of the ₦5 to ₦50 banknotes were introduced. Originally the ₦10, ₦20 and ₦50 were to be polymer banknotes, but the ₦5, ₦10 and ₦50 were delayed to late 2009 and only the ₦20 was released in polymer. The notes are slightly smaller (130 × 72 mm) and redesigned from the preceding issues. In mid-2009 when Sanusi Lamido Sanusi took over as CBN Governor, The Central Bank of Nigeria changed the ₦5, ₦10 and ₦50 to polymer notes.

On the ₦1,000 notes, there is a subtle shiny strip running down the back of the note to prevent counterfeiting. The strip is a shimmery gold color showing ₦1,000 and has a triangular shape in the middle of the front of the note which changes its color from green to blue when tilted. The main feature on the front is the engraved portraits of Alhaji Aliyu Mai-Bornu and Dr. Clement Isong, both of which are former governors of the Central Bank of Nigeria.

On the first prints of the ₦100 notes issued starting 1 December 1999, Zuma Rock was captioned as located in Federal Capital Territory, while actually it is situated in Niger State. Later prints removed the reference to FCT, ABUJA.

In 2012, the Central Bank of Nigeria was considering the introduction of new currency denominations of ₦5,000. The bank also made plans to convert ₦5, ₦10, ₦20 and ₦50 into coins which are all presently notes.

The Central Bank of Nigeria announced that it would no longer issue banknotes on polymer citing higher costs and environmental issues.

On 12 November 2014, the Central Bank of Nigeria issued a ₦100 commemorative note to celebrate the centennial of Nigeria's existence. The notes are similar to its regular issue with the portrait of Chief Obafemi Awolowo on the front, but are redesigned to include a new color scheme, revised security features, and the text "One Nigeria, Great Promise" in microprinting. On the back is a QR code (Quick Response code) which when scanned leads users to a website about Nigeria's history.

In 2019, the naira attained a landmark when it featured the signature of Priscilla Ekwere Eleje, the new Director of Currency operations of the Central Bank of Nigeria and the first woman to hold the post. Currently, Nigeria has two ₦200 notes, two ₦500 notes, and two ₦1000 notes in circulation.

Currently circulating banknotes
1999–2005 series
Image	Value	Dimensions	Main colour	Description			Date of	
Obverse	Value	Dimensions	Main colour	Obverse	Reverse	Watermark	First printing	Issue
	₦100	151 × 78 mm	Purple and multicolour	Chief Obafemi Awolowo	Zuma Rock	As portrait(s), "CBN", value	1999	1 December 1999
	₦200	151 × 78 mm	Cyan and multicolour	Sir Ahmadu Bello	Pyramid of agricultural commodity and livestock farming	As portrait(s), "CBN", value	2000	1 November 2000
	₦500	151 × 78 mm	Blue and multicolour	Dr. Nnamdi Azikiwe	Off-shore oil rig	As portrait(s), "CBN", value	2001	4 April 2001
	₦1000	151 × 78 mm	Brown	Alhaji Aliyu Mai-Bornu, Dr. Clement Isong	CBN's corporate headquarters in Abuja	As portrait(s), "CBN", value	2005	12 October 2005
2006 series (paper and polymer banknotes)
	₦5	130 × 72 mm	Brown	Alhaji Abubakar Tafawa Balewa	Nkpokiti dancers	Central Bank of Nigeria logo, "CBN"	2006	28 February 2007
	₦10	130 × 72 mm	Red	Alvan Ikoku	Fulani milk maids	Central Bank of Nigeria logo, "CBN"	2006	28 February 2007
	₦20	130 × 72 mm	Green	General Murtala Mohammed	Ladi Kwali	Central Bank of Nigeria logo, "CBN"	2006	28 February 2007
	₦50	130 × 72 mm	Blue	Hausa, Igbo and Yoruba men and a woman	Local fishermen	Central Bank of Nigeria logo, "CBN"	2006	28 February 2007
For table standards, see the banknote specification table.

== Proposed redenomination ==
The naira was scheduled for redenomination in August 2008, although this was cancelled by then-President Umaru Musa Yar'Adua, with 100 old naira to become 1 new naira. The Nigerian Central Bank stated that it would make the naira fully convertible against foreign currencies by 2009. Currently, the amount of foreign currency is regulated through weekly auctions, while the Central Bank sets the exchange rate. The naira appreciated against the dollar through 2007 due to high oil revenues. Also, the then-Bank Governor, Professor Chukwuma Soludo noted the weekly central bank auctions of foreign currency will gradually be phased out, and that the bank would "only intervene in the market as may be required to achieve defined policy objectives".

Coins and banknotes, and their security features, are described on the website of the Central Bank of Nigeria.

=== Coins ===
Coins were to be issued in denominations of:

- 1 kobo (₦0.01)
- 2 kobo (₦0.02)
- 5 kobo (₦0.05)
- 10 kobo (₦0.10)
- 20 kobo (₦0.20)
- 50 Kobo (₦0.50)
- 1 Naira (₦1)

Due to inflation, Nigerian coins are all essentially worthless now.

=== Banknotes ===
Banknotes were to be printed in denominations of:

- 5 naira (₦5)
- 10 naira (₦10)
- 20 naira (₦20)
- 50 naira (₦50)
- 100 naira (₦100)
- 200 naira (₦200)
- 500 naira (₦500)
- 1000 naira (₦1000)

== 2022 redesign ==
In 2022, a policy was implemented by the Central Bank of Nigeria (CBN) to redesign and replace the highest denomination banknotes: the ₦200, ₦500, and ₦1,000 notes. Announced in October 2022 by the then-Governor of the CBN, Godwin Emefiele, the policy also included a strict deadline for the demonetization of the old notes, which led to a severe currency crisis in the country in late 2022 and early 2023.

=== Background and rationale ===
The Central Bank of Nigeria cited several reasons for the currency redesign and the associated demonetization policy, noting that, by global best practice, currency should be redesigned every 5 to 8 years, and the Naira was long overdue. The key stated objectives were:

- The Central Bank of Nigeria (CBN) aimed to disrupt the activities of individuals engaged in currency fraud and to compel the return of large volumes of illegally acquired cash hoarded outside the banking system.
- A primary objective was to undermine the financing of criminal activities, such as kidnapping-for-ransom and banditry, which rely heavily on cash transactions for illicit funding.
- The redesign was intended to help ease inflationary pressures by reducing the excessive amount of money supply held outside the formal banking sector.
- The policy sought to enhance the CBN's visibility and control over the money supply, thereby strengthening the effectiveness of its monetary policy decisions.

=== Implementation and timeline ===
The policy was rolled out with a tight deadline for the withdrawal of the old notes, which was subsequently subject to several extensions and legal challenges.

Date	Event
October 26, 2022	The CBN announces its naira redesign policy. Sets January 31, 2023, as the swap deadline for the public.
November 17, 2022	The CBN instructs commercial banks to extend working hours to Saturdays.
November 23, 2022	New notes unveiled by President Muhammadu Buhari.
December 15, 2022	Commercial banks start dispensing new notes.
January 7, 2023	The CBN suspends over-the-counter (OTC) withdrawal of new notes to aid fairness in distribution.
January 29, 2023	Swap deadline extended to February 10, 2023, and the CBN says 1.9 trillion naira has been recovered.
February 2, 2023	The CBN orders commercial banks to resume payment of new notes OTC.
February 8, 2023	The Supreme Court restrains the CBN from enforcing February 10 deadline.
February 15, 2023	The CBN launches the old naira collection portal.
February 16, 2023	Buhari extends the validity of the old 200 naira to April 10.
March 3, 2023	The Supreme Court rules that the old naira denominations of 200, 500, and 1,000 shall remain the legal tender until December 31, 2023.
March 7, 2023	Commercial banks resume dispensing old notes.
March 13, 2023	The CBN confirms the Supreme Court ruling that old notes shall remain legal tender until December 31, 2023.
November 14, 2023	The Supreme Court rules that the old 200, 500, and 1,000 naira notes will remain legal tender and coexist with the new notes until further notice.

=== Design changes ===
The redesign primarily focused on changing the colour palette and enhancing the security features of the affected denominations. Unlike some previous currency changes, the core images (portraits of national figures and other symbols) on the front and back of the notes remained largely the same, though the aesthetic details were modernised. The redesigned denominations featured significant colour changes: the ₦1,000 banknote adopted a blue colour, the ₦500 note was issued in green, and the ₦200 note changed to a reddish hue (similar to the previous ₦500 note).

=== Consequences and impact ===
Despite the CBN's stated objectives, the implementation of the policy generated significant and widely criticised consequences, primarily due to a severe shortage of the new banknotes in circulation, coupled with the tight demonetization deadlines.

- Cash scarcity and economic disruption: The scarcity of both old and new notes led to a prolonged cash crunch across Nigeria, severely impacting the economy. Businesses, particularly those in the informal sector which relies heavily on cash, suffered significant losses. Many citizens endured long queues at banks and automated teller machines (ATMs).
- Rise of a black market for cash: The scarcity led to the emergence of a black market where point of sale (PoS) agents charged exorbitant fees to dispense cash to desperate citizens.
- Digital infrastructure strain: The sudden shift to digital payments overwhelmed the capacity of electronic banking channels, leading to a high rate of failed transactions and system downtime across commercial banks.
- Controversy and legal challenges: The policy was highly controversial, with critics arguing the timing (just before the 2023 general elections) and implementation were flawed. Several state governments took the federal government to the Supreme Court to challenge the CBN's imposed deadlines.
- Inflation and GDP impact: The disruptive nature of the policy contributed to a slowdown in economic activities; Nigeria's GDP growth rate decreased from 3.5% in the fourth quarter of 2022 to 2.3% in the first quarter of 2023.

Ultimately, while the policy led to a significant amount of cash being deposited into the banking system, it also triggered an unprecedented cash crisis, leading to widespread hardship before the Supreme Court and presidential directives restored the legal tender status of the old notes for an extended period.

== Hidden naira notes ==
In 2022, Nigeria's central bank expressed the scarcity of the currency due to high volume of the naira kept outside the banking system and attributed to be hoarded by politicians.

== Exchange rates ==
When the naira was introduced, it had an official exchange rate of US$1.52 for ₦1, though a currency black market existed in which the naira traded at a discount relative to the official exchange rate.

As of August 27, 2025, the official CBN NAFEM rate stood at approximately ₦1,537.07 per $1, while aboki dollar parallel market rate averaged ₦1,545 - ₦1,550 per $1, reflecting a modest spread of ₦8 - ₦13 between both markets.

The official exchange rate set by the Central Bank of Nigeria: naira to U.S. dollar is approximately ₦1480.15 per 1 US dollar as of September 2025.

According to a recent (June 2024) report by Naija News, the parallel market exchange rate of the naira to the U.S. dollar is around ₦1483 per 1 USD, significantly higher than the official Central Bank of Nigeria rate. This disparity highlights underlying economic challenges and market pressures.

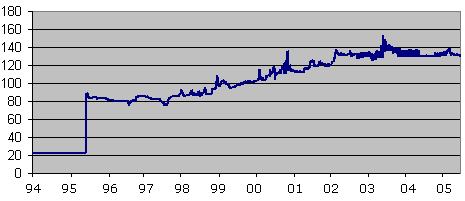
Rate of the Nigerian naira for US$1 (1994–2005)

Rate of the Nigerian naira for US$1 (2000–June 2025)

This table shows the historical value of one U.S. dollar in Nigerian naira. PM = parallel market.

Date	₦ per US$	Date	₦ per US$	Date	₦ per US$
1972	0.658	1993	17.30 (21.90 PM)	2014	170–199
1973	0.658	1994	22.33 (56.80 PM)	2015	199–300
1974	0.63	1995	21.89 (71.70 PM)	2016	390–489
1975	0.616	1996	21.89 (84.58 PM)	2017	333
1976	0.62	1997	21.89 (84.58 PM)	2018	360
1977	0.647	1998	21.89 (84.70 PM)	2019	305
1978	0.606	1999	21.89 (88–90 PM)	2020	361
1979	0.596	2000	85.98 (105.00 PM)	2021	399
1980	0.550 (0.900 PM)	2001	99–106 (104–122 PM)	2022	423
1981	0.61	2002	109–113 (122–140 PM)	2024	1483
1982	0.673	2003	114–127 (135–137 PM)	Jan 2025	1555
1983	0.724	2004	127–130 (137–144 PM)		
1984	0.765	2005	132–136		
1985	0.894 (1.70 PM)	2006	128.50–131.80		
1986	2.02 (3.90 PM)	2007	120–125		
1987	4.02 (5.90 PM)	2008	115.50–120		
1988	4.54 (6.70 PM)	2009	145–171		
1989	7.39 (10.70 PM)	2010	148.21–154.8		
1990	7.39 (10.70 PM)	2011	151.05–165.1		
1991	8.04 (9.30 PM)	2012	155.09–161.5		
1992	9.91	2013	153.21–162.9		

Current NGN exchange rates
From Google Finance:	AUD CAD CHF CNY EUR GBP HKD JPY USD XOF
From Yahoo! Finance:	AUD CAD CHF CNY EUR GBP HKD JPY USD XOF
From XE.com:	AUD CAD CHF CNY EUR GBP HKD JPY USD XOF
From OANDA:	AUD CAD CHF CNY EUR GBP HKD JPY USD XOF

== See also ==
- Economy of Nigeria
