= Federal College of Horticultural Technology, Dadin Kowa =

Public College, Nigeria

Federal College of Horticultural Technology
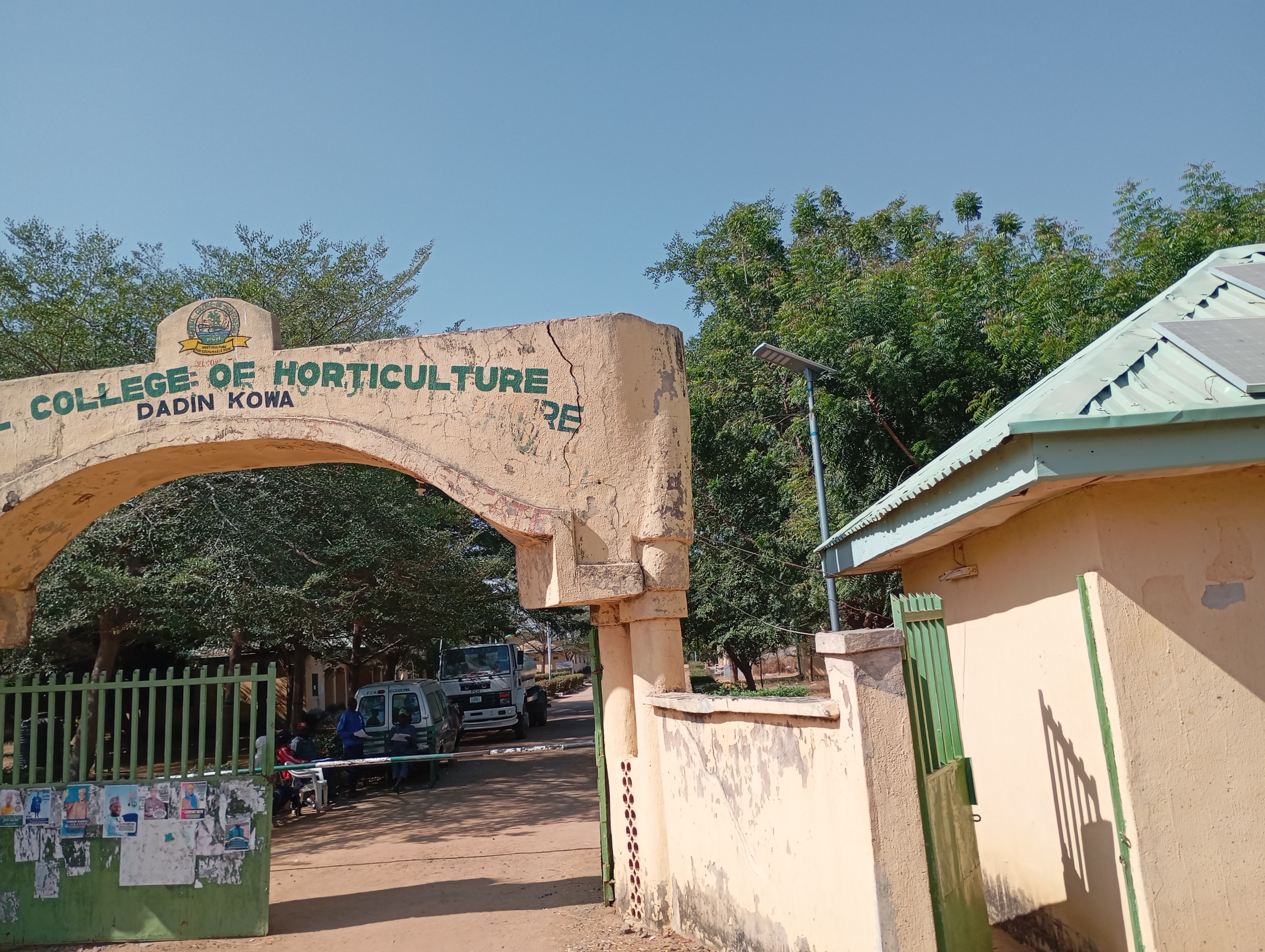
- Main gate of the college, 2023

Location
- Dadin Kowa, Yamaltu Deba, Gombe State; Nigeria
- 10.3145°N 11.5308°E

Information
- Established: 19 April 2002
- Founder: Gombe State government
- Website: fchdk.edu.ng

Federal College of Horticultural Technology is a government-owned tertiary institution of learning located at Dadin Kowa, Yamaltu Deba local government area of Gombe State, Nigeria.

The college is a research institution under the Agricultural Research Council of Nigeria with the mandate to train and improve manpower in Horticultural and Landscaping Technology.

== Background ==
The college with approval from National Board for Technical Education, is a National Diploma and Higher National Diploma awarding institution and had graduated over 1,354 students.

On 19 April 2002, the administration of President Chief Olusegun Obasanjo approved its establishment becoming the first of its kind in sub-Saharan Africa.

As at 2017, the institution with funding from the Ministry of Agriculture and Rural Development trained 1500 youths drawn from the 36 States of the federation in the area of agriculture and plant production. As of 2016/2017, the college matriculated 603 students.

=== Bill for Conversion ===
A House of Representative member, Hon. Abubakar Yunus Ahmad Ustaz, submitted a bill to the 8th Assembly for the establishment of a Federal University of Agriculture, Dadin Kowa. However, the bill suffered set back in the Senate.

In 2019, after the 9th Assembly was constituted the bill was reintroduced to the house through the House Committee of Whole and adopted by February 2020. And subsequent transmission to Senate for concurrent legislature on the bill.

The bill survived the first reading in the Senate in June, 2021 and consequently second reading on the Senate Order Paper on 15 December 2021 and third reading before passage on 9 February 2022. The bill if assent to by the administration of President Muhammadu Buhari the institution will be converted from college to Federal University of Agriculture, Dadin Kowa.

== Schools ==
The institution offers the following programs:

=== Higher National Diploma HND (2 years) ===
The programs in higher diploma are as follows:

1. Horticultural Technology
2. Agricultural Extension & Management
3. Pest Management Technology
4. Crop Production
5. Animal Health Technology
6. Animal Production Technology
7. Cooperative Economics And Management
8. Agric Business Management

=== National Diploma ND (2 years) ===
1. Horticultural Technology
2. Agricultural Technology
3. Animal Health &Production Technology
4. Cooperative Economics &Management
5. Fishery Technology
6. Science Laboratory Technology
7. Computer Science
8. Library and Information Science
9. Social Development

=== Certificate Courses ===
1. Certificate In General Horticulture, Floriculture, Vegetable Production, Orchard Establishment, Agro-Forestry etc.-1 Year duration.
2. Certificate in Animal Health, Fisheries, Poultry Production, Beef And Dairy Production, Small Ruminants Production
  - Animal Health and Production
  - Statistics
  - Horticulture Management
  - Agriculture Extension Management
  - Cooperative Economic Management
  - Science Laboratory Technology
  - Fishery Technology
  - Health and Production Technology
  - Cooperative Economics and Management
