= Federal University of Education, Pankshin =

Federal government higher education institution in Pankshin, Plateau State, Nigeria

- Motto: Excellence in Service
- Type: Public
- Established: 1974
- Vice-Chancellor: Prof. Noel Nenman Wannang
- Location: Pankshin, Plateau State, Nigeria; 9.3414°N 9.3939°E
- Website: Official website

The Federal University of Education, Pankshin is a federal government higher education institution located in Pankshin, Plateau State, Nigeria. It was affiliated to University of Jos for its degree programmes while it was Federal College of Education, Pankshin. The current Vice chancellor is Prof. Noel Nenman Wannang.

== History ==
The Federal University of Education, Pankshin was established in 1974. It was originally known as Federal Advanced Teachers College (FATC) but was later named Federal College of Education, Pankshin. On 23 September 2024 Federal College of Education Pankshin was upgraded to Federal University of Education Pankshin with the mandate to produce higher quality graduate teachers of international standard and to be a centre of excellence in research in education.

== Library ==
The college library has information resources that support the courses offered in the school with teaching and learning.

== Courses ==
The institution offers the following courses:

- College of Adult, Non-Formal, and Special Needs Education
  - Adult and Continuing Education
  - Special Needs Education
- College of Arts and Social Sciences
  - Religious Studies (Christian Religious Studies)
  - Islamic Studies
  - Music Education
  - History Education
  - Political Science Education
  - Economics Education
  - Geography Education
  - Social Studies and Civic Education
- College of Early Childhood Care and Primary Education
  - Early Childhood Education
  - Primary Education
  - Sustainable Development Studies
- College of Education
  - Guidance and Counselling
  - Library and Information Science
  - Educational Management
- College of Sciences
  - Physics Education
  - Chemistry Education
  - Computer Science Education
  - Biology Education
  - Environmental Education
  - Integrated Science Education
  - Health Education
  - Human Kinetics Education
  - Mathematics Education
- College of Vocational and Technical Education
  - Agricultural Science Education
  - Business Education
  - Creative Arts Education (Fine and Applied Arts)
  - Entrepreneurship Education
  - Home Economics Education
  - Technology Education
- College of Languages
  - English Language Education
  - French Language Education
  - Hausa Education
  - Arabic Language Education
  - Language Arts and Communication

== Affiliation ==
The institution was affiliated with the University of Jos and it offered programmes leading to Bachelor of Education, (B.Ed.); Bachelor of Science Education, (B.Sc. Ed.); Bachelor of Arts Education, (B.A. Ed.) in:

- Adult and Non-Formal Education
- Agricultural Science Education
- Arabic Education
- Biology Education
- Business Education
- Chemistry Education
- Computer Science Education
- Early Childhood and Care Education
- Educational Planning and Administration
- English Language Education
- Fine and Applied Arts Education
- French Education
- Guidance and Counselling
- Home Economics Education
- Integrated Science Education
- Islamic Studies
- Mathematics Education
- Music Education
- Physics and Health Education
- Physics Education
- Primary Education Studies
- Religious Studies
- Social Studies
- Special Education
- Technical Education
