= College of Education, Waka-Biu =

College in Borno State, Nigeria

Coordinates: 10.63649°N 12.19565°E

- Type: Public
- Established: 1986
- Provost: Dr. Gambo salbaja
- Location: Biu, Borno State, Nigeria
- Website: coewakabiu.edu.ng

The College of Education, Waka-Biu is a state government higher education institution located in Biu, Borno State, Nigeria. The current Provost is Mohammed Alhaji Audu.

== History ==
The College of Education, Waka-Biu was established in 1986. It was formally known as Advanced Teachers' College, Waka-Biu.

== Courses ==
The institution offers the following courses:

- Computer Education
- Economics Education
- Integrated Science Education
- Early Childhood Education
- Geography
- Education and Chemistry
- Home Economics
- Education and Geography
- Education and Physics
- Education and Biology
- Islamic Studies
- English Education
- Agricultural Science Education
- Arabic
- Mathematics Education
- Biology Education
- Physical And Health Education
