= Adamawa State College of Education =

State government higher education institution in Adamawa State, Nigeria

Coordinates: 9.2156424°N 11.272964°E

- Type: Public
- Established: 1970
- Provost: Benson Yusuf Baha
- Location: Hong, Adamawa State, Nigeria
- Affiliations: Ahmadu Bello University

The Adamawa State College of Education is a state government higher education institution located in Hong, Adamawa State, Nigeria.

The Adamawa State College of Education Hong was established in 1981 as Advanced Teachers College in the defunct Gongola State Government under the Educational Programme of a five–year development Plan (1980–1985) in the state. Edict Law No.4 of 1982, in Gazette No.3 volume10 of 1985. It has a total land mass of 1,522 hectares.

The college commenced its maiden academic session in January 1983 with NCE programmes offered in the school of education, humanities, languages and pure and applied sciences with a total of sixteen courses of different combinations and a total of ninety-five (95) students.

The nomenclature of the college was changed from Advanced Teachers College Hong to Adamawa State College of Education, Hong by a gazette published by Adamawa State Government ADS Law No. 42015, which also captures the retirement age of college staff to be sixty-five years and no more thirty-five years of service. This is done in order to retain qualified and well-trained lecturers and administrators, especially with the introduction of the degree programme affiliated to Ahmadu Bello University Zaria (ABU) and Taraba State University, Jalingo and the diploma in Information and Communication Technology affiliated to Modibbo Adama University Yola (MAU).

The current Provost is Prof. Benson Yusuf Baha.

== History ==
The Adamawa State College of Education was established in 1981.

== Courses ==
The institution offers the following courses;

- Biology Education
- Physical And Health Education
- Christian Religious Studies
- Fine And Applied Arts
- Education and Social Studies
- Education and English
- Chemistry Education
- Geography
- History
- French
- Islamic Studies
- Home Economics
- Primary Education Studies
- Arabic
- Agricultural Science and Education
- Education and Mathematics
- Integrated Science
- Hausa

== Affiliation ==
The institution is affiliated with the Ahmadu Bello University and Taraba State University, Jalingo to offer programmes leading to Bachelor of Education, (B.Ed.) in;
