= Federal Polytechnic, Kaltungo =

Nigeria Federal government-owned higher institution

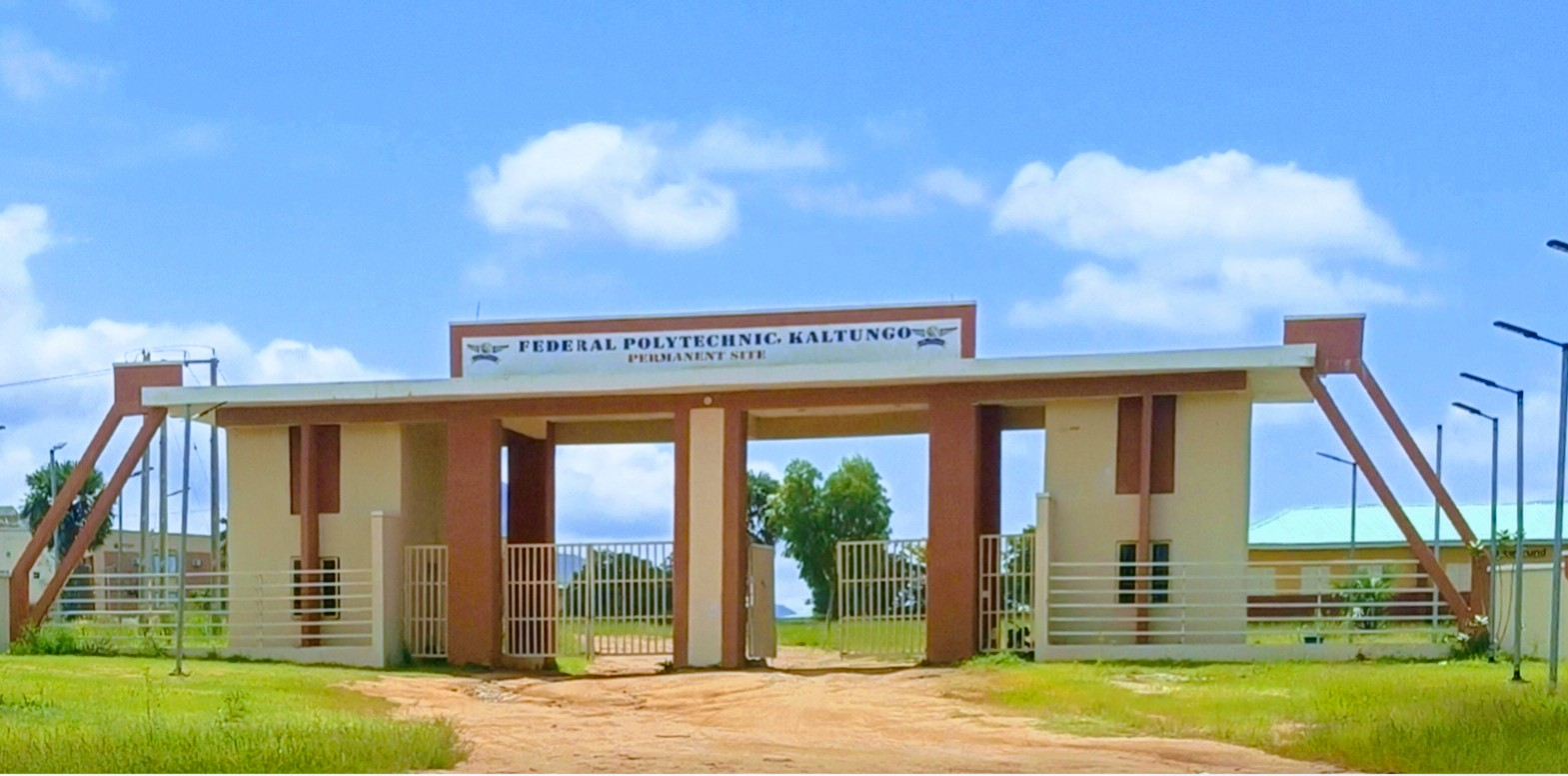
- Motto in English: With Vision, We Explore Potentials
- Type: Public
- Established: 2019
- Founder: Federal Government of Nigeria
- Rector: Dr Ibrahim Babale Gashua
- Location: Kaltungo, Gombe State, Nigeria
- Website: https://fedpolyklt.edu.ng/

The Federal Polytechnic, Kaltungo is a Nigeria federal government-owned higher institution located in Kaltungo, a local government area in Gombe State, North-Eastern Nigeria and one of the eight (8) newly established Polytechnics in Nigeria.

== History ==
Federal polytechnic, Kaltungo was established with the Federal Polytechnic Establishment Act of 2019 and it is currently running its academic activities on a take-off site at the premise of Model School in Kaltungo. However, the community has allocated double of the parcel of land, 100 hectares of land, instead of the 50 hectares of land requested by the government for the permanent site.

== Faculties/Schools ==
=== A. School of Engineering ===
I. National Diploma in Electrical and Electronics Engineering Technology:

II. National Diploma in Computer engineering Technology,

=== B. School of Science and Technology ===
III. National Diploma in Science Laboratory Technology:

IV. National Diploma in Computer science,

V. National Diploma in Statistics,

VI. National Diploma in Leisure and Tourism Management;

=== C. School of Management Studies ===
VII. National Diploma in Accountancy

VIII. National Diploma in Business Administration and Management;

IX. National Diploma in Public administration.

=== D. School of General Studies ===
X National Diploma in Crime Management and Control

XI. National Diploma in Library and Information science.

== Governing councils ==
On 11 January 2022, the Federal Government of Nigeria via the Minister of Education, Adamu Adamu, announces the inauguration of the Governing Councils of eight newly Federal Polytechnics founded by the President, Major General Muhammadu Buhari(retd.) led administration.

Below are the list of the governing councils of the polytechnic

Mr. L. Micah Kamat cna.( Chairman )

Dr Lydia Umar (Member)

Abdul Maizabi (Member)

Mr Jide Akinleye (Member)

Labour M. Lele (Member)

== Principal officers ==
The Rector of the school is Dr Ibrahim Babale Gashua who got the position after serving as the Acting rector of Federal Polytechnic Damaturu in Yobe state.

Educational background

Dr Ibrahim Babale Gashua had his first degree, Masters and PhD at University Of Maiduguri, Modibbo Adama Federal University Of Technology, Yola and University of Wolverhampton, England respectively.

== Admission process ==
The Jamb cut-off mark for applicants was pegged at 160 and above as at last year with the post Utme 50% meaning that anyone who scored 50/100 were considered for admission.

The final admission cut-off mark was derived from O'level grades, Jamb and Post-utme score which were all dependent on admission quota for each department
