= Umar Suleiman College of Education =

State government higher education institution in Gashua, Nigeria

Coordinates: 12.87718°N 11.01072°E

Umar Suleiman College of Education, Gashua
- Type: Public
- Established: 1986
- Affiliations: University of Maiduguri
- Provost: Abdurahman Danladi
- Location: Gashua, Yobe State, Nigeria
- Website: Official website

The Umar Suleiman College of Education is a state government higher education institution located in Gashua, Yobe State, Nigeria. It is affiliated with the University of Maiduguri (UNIMAID) for its degree programmes. The current Provost is Dr. Abdurahman Danladi.

== History ==
The Umar Suleiman College of Education was established in 1986. It was formerly known as Advanced Teacher's College, Gashua.

Having been the first higher institution of learning in Yobe, Umar Suleiman College of Education was home to many great teachers in the state and Nigeria at large. Thus, the need to increase enrollment in order to meet the state's requirement for a large number of teachers in post-primary schools led the then-Borno State Government, led by Lt. Col. Abdulmimini Aminu, to approve the establishment of three more colleges at Gashua, Biu, and Bama. The following goals guided the establishment of the College:

- To offer research, study, and training programs in the humanities, sciences, and languages that lead to the Nigeria Certificate in Education.
- To support NCE holder who will work as teachers in the state primary and post-primary schools.
- Providing academic and professional courses for the college's students as well as other students.

== Library ==
The school has modern Library that support teaching and research among students and lecturers.

== Courses ==
The institution offers the following courses;

- Biology Education
- Physical And Health Education
- Islamic Studies
- Primary Education
- Education and Economics
- Kanuri
- Home Economics
- Education and Mathematics
- Integrated Science
- Chemistry Education
- Agricultural Science
- Fine And Applied Arts
- Social Studies
- Education and English Language
- Education and Physics
- Education and French
- Business Education
- Education and History
- Primary Education Studies
- Special Education
- Early Childhood Care Education
- Arabic
- Education and Hausa
- Education and Geography
- Christian Religious Studies
- Computer Science Education
- Education and Islamic Studies

== Affiliation ==
The institution is affiliated with the University of Maiduguri (UNIMAID) to offer programmes leading to Bachelor of Education, (B.Ed.).
