= Kwara State College of Education (Technical), Lafiagi =

Higher education institution in Nigeria

Coordinates: 8.83682°N 5.39852°E

- Type: Public
- Established: 1991
- Affiliations: Adekunle Ajasin University, Akungba-Akoko, Ondo State, Nigeria
- Provost: Dr Mohammed Dede Ibrahim
- Location: Lafiagi, Kwara State, Nigeria
- Website: kwacoetl.edu.ng

The Kwara State College of Education (Technical), Lafiagi is a state government higher education institution located in Lafiagi, Kwara State, Nigeria. The current Provost is Dr. Mohammed Dede Ibrahim .

== History ==
The Kwara State College of Education (Technical), Lafiagi was established in 1991.

== College Library ==
The college library is equipped with information resources that support all the courses offered in the school. The college Librarian named Muhammed Abbas Ibrahim.

== Courses ==
The institution offers the following courses;

- Education and Political Science
- Business Education
- Education and Christian Religious Studies
- Mathematics
- Education and English Language
- Computer Education
- Economics
- Integrated Science
- Library and Information Science
- Biology Education
- Technical Education
- Education and Social Studies
- Chemistry Education
