= Alvan Ikoku Federal College of Education =

Federal University in Owerri

Alvan Ikoku Federal University of Education
- Type: Public
- Established: April, 1963
- Affiliations: University of Nigeria, Nsukka
- Location: Owerri, Imo State, Nigeria; 5°30′1″N 7°1′27″E
- Website: www.alvanikoku.edu.ng

Alvan Ikoku Federal University of Education, Owerri, formerly known as the Alvan Ikoku Federal College of Education, is located in Owerri, the capital of Imo State, Nigeria. It was established in April 1963 as the Advanced Teachers' Training College by the defunct Eastern Nigeria Government on the grounds of the Old Shell Camp in Owerri. Since then, the institution has expanded across Orlu Road on the banks of the Nworie River. The university awards the National Certificate in Education (NCE) and the Professional Diploma in Education (PDE) and, in affiliation with the University of Nigeria, Nsukka, has been awarding Bachelor of Education (B.Ed.) since 1984. The university is headed by Dr. (Mrs.) Stella Ngozi Lemchi, the Acting Vice-Chancellor (Administration), who was the former Provost of the college. She took over from Dr. Dan C. Anyawu in 2022. Dr. Lemchi is the second female Provost of the college, after Professor Blessing C. Ijioma.

== History ==
The college was founded in 1963 as the Advanced Teachers Training College with technical assistance from UNESCO. It was charged with the responsibility of training teachers in line with the Ashby report on Higher Education in Nigeria. In 1973, via Edict No. 11 promulgated by the Administrator of East-Central State of Nigeria, Ukpabi Asika, the Teachers College became a College of Education and was named in honour of Alvan Ikoku, a teacher and educationist, founder of the first African owned secondary school in Nigeria (Aggrey Memorial Grammar School) and President of the Nigerian Union of Teachers (NUT) for many years.

The college started with 150 students and by 2012 the student population had grown to over 13,000, with over 600 academic staff. The students include regular undergraduates, sandwich course students, evening and weekend students and post-graduates studying the Professional Diploma in Education. In 1976, a campus of the college catering to the Department of Agriculture was established in Umuahia, now the capital of Abia State. Next was the establishment of an Orlu campus in 1981, but the multi-campus system was ended in 1987, and the college reverted to a single campus institution.

In 2007, the Federal Government took over the college and it metamorphosed into Alvan Ikoku Federal College of Education, Owerri. The Federal Government take-over brought improved financial aid, and the college has become able to renovate old structures, build large classrooms, laboratories and hostels and expanded the staff strength. It also enabled the college to start new departments and Schools and establish new ventures. On May 20, 2015, the Federal Government of Nigeria under President Goodluck Jonathan upgraded the school to a university to be called Alvan Ikoku University of Education. However, a few months later, the Muhammadu Buhari administration put the upgrade "on hold." In October 2023, the college was finally upgraded to a University of Education by the Bola Tinubu government.

=== Faculties ===
The college has six Faculties which include the:

1. Faculty of Vocational and Technology
2. Faculty of Specialized Education
3. Faculty of Professional Education
4. Faculty of Sciences
5. Faculty of Arts
6. Faculty of Social and Management Sciences

== Principals/Provosts ==
- Mr. A. J. Brooks
- Mr. Jonah O. Wachuku (1970)
- Mr. John Munonye (1970–1974)
- Prof. B. O. Ukeje (First Provost: 1974 – 1980)
- Prof. S. N. Nwosu (1980 – 1985)
- Prof. N. A Nwagwu (1986 – 1992)
- Prof. E. N. Emenyonu (1992 – 1995)
- Dr. Dan Onwukwe (Acting: 1995)
- Prof. A. E. Afigbo (Sole Administrator: 1996 – 1997)
- Prof. L. E Amadi (1997 – 1999)
- Dr. Dan Onwukwe (1999 – 2004)
- Prof. Ngozi Uwazurike (2004 – 2009)
- Dr. H. C. Amadi (Acting: 2009 – 2010)
- Dr (Mrs.) Blessing C. Ijioma (2010 – 2017)
- Dr. Dan C. Anyanwu (2017 – 2022)
- Dr. (Mrs.) Stella N. Lemchi (2022 - 2023)
- Dr. (Mrs.) Stella N. Lemchi (Ag. Deputy Vice-Chancellor (Admin): 2022 - Date)

== Academics ==
The establishment of the Alvan Ikoku Federal College of Education, Owerri in 1963, just three years after Nigeria's independence was a milestone in the annals of education in Nigeria, especially the South-East. In 1984, the college became affiliated with the University of Nigeria, Nsukka to award the bachelor's degree in various subject areas. In 2023, it was upgraded to a University of Education.

The institution houses the students in hostels named alphabetically from A-G. The college has students from all over the country and several countries from West Africa, especially the Spanish speaking countries whose citizens come to study English at the International Centre for English Studies (ICES). The college has a predominantly female student population with females making up over 80%.

The Sandwich Programme caters for people pursuing a teaching career who want to improve their education. These students study during the holidays when the full-time Regular undergraduate students have dispersed, and primary and secondary schools are on break. The students have a Student Union Government (SUG) led by an elected president and a Students Representative Council (SRC), a body of elected student legislators. In spite of the dominant female population, the SUG Presidents have been males, except for 2019–2020 academic session when Comrade Ugonna Gloria Alozie won the Presidency.

The institution runs demonstration centres. They are Department of Early Childhood Care Kindergarten/Nursery School, Department of Primary Education School and the School of Education Demonstration Secondary School. The Primary School was set up in 1983 and the Secondary School started in October 1994.
