= Zuma Rock =

Monolith in Madalla, Niger State, Nigeria

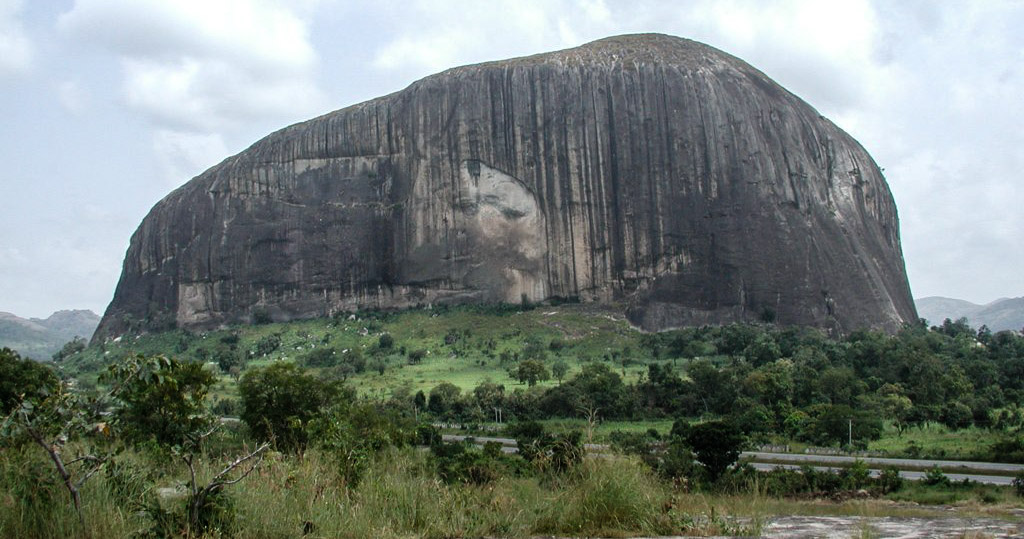

Highest point
- Elevation: 725 m (2,379 ft)
- Prominence: 300 m (980 ft)
- Coordinates: 9°7′49″N 7°14′2″E

Naming
- English translation: Big rock
- Language of name: Koro

Geography
- Location within Nigeria

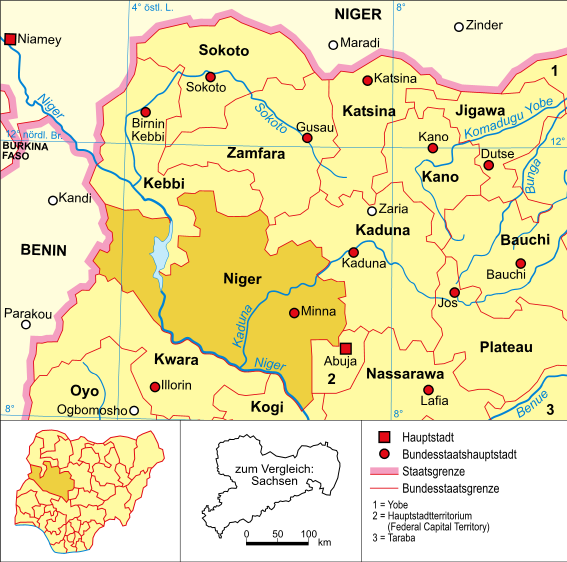
- Location: Madalla, Niger State, Nigeria

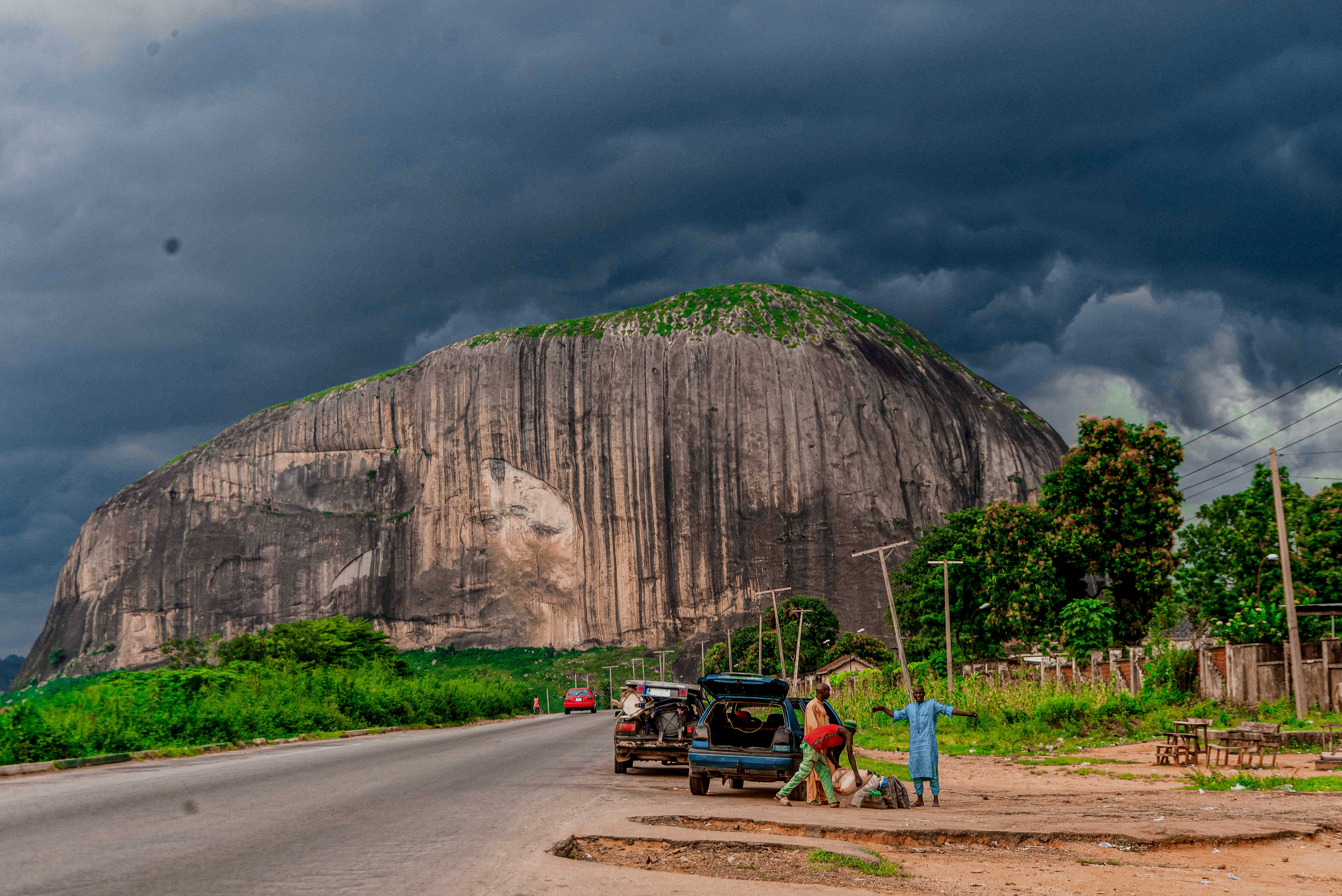
Zuma Rock

Zuma Rock is a large natural monolith, or inselberg, an igneous intrusion composed of gabbro and granodiorite and of Precambrian age, located in Madalla, a town in Niger State, Nigeria. It is situated in the west of Nigeria's capital, Abuja, along the main road from Abuja to Kaduna, off Madalla, and is sometimes referred to as the "Gateway to Abuja from Suleja". Zuma Rock rises approximately 725 metres (2,379 ft) above sea level. It was once thought to be in the Federal Capital Territory but is actually located at the upper end of Madalla, a rural settlement in Suleja Local Government Area of Niger State.

Zuma Rock is depicted on the 100 naira note. It was used for a defensive retreat by the Gbagyi people against invading neighbouring tribes during intertribal wars.

== Discovery ==
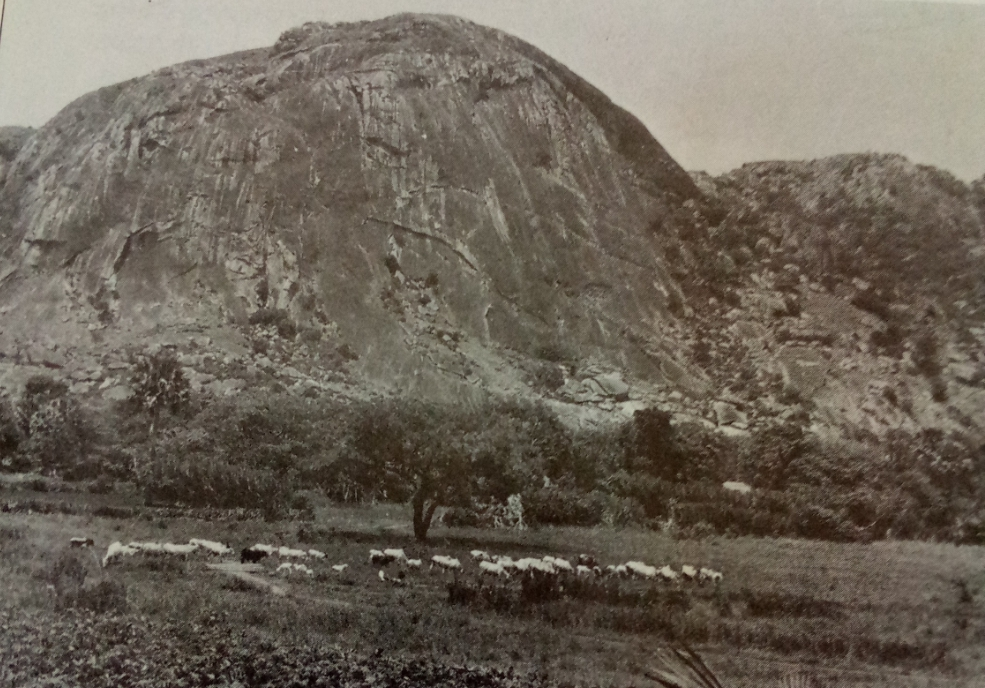
The rock in 1960

The rock was found in the 15th century by the Zuba people of Niger State, who called it zumwa, which could translate to “a place of guinea fowls”. It had been known that by the 15th century the Kwararafa (Kororofa) had started to spread all over the northern areas of Nigeria. The people of Zuba today were part of the Kwararafa that are called or identified today as Koro. They are part of the Jukun that are in diaspora. The forefathers spread from the Kwararafa empire, travelled to the western direction through Lafia (but Lafia was not there as at that time), then through Keffi area (but there was nothing like Keffi as at that time), then into the old Abuja area which was not in existence then too. But before they reached the Zuma Rock, their soothsayers told them that they are not to settle down permanently until they reached one wonderful rock, far ahead of them. They continued to move approaching the Zuma rock till they came to meet the Zuma rock in the middle of a thick forest. When they entered into the forest, they settled within a mile radius around it and founded settlements like Shinapa (where their leadership was), Chaci, Luki, Esa, Zumwa, Yeku, Huntu, Wagu of the upperland and Wagu of the lowerland.

== Local legends ==
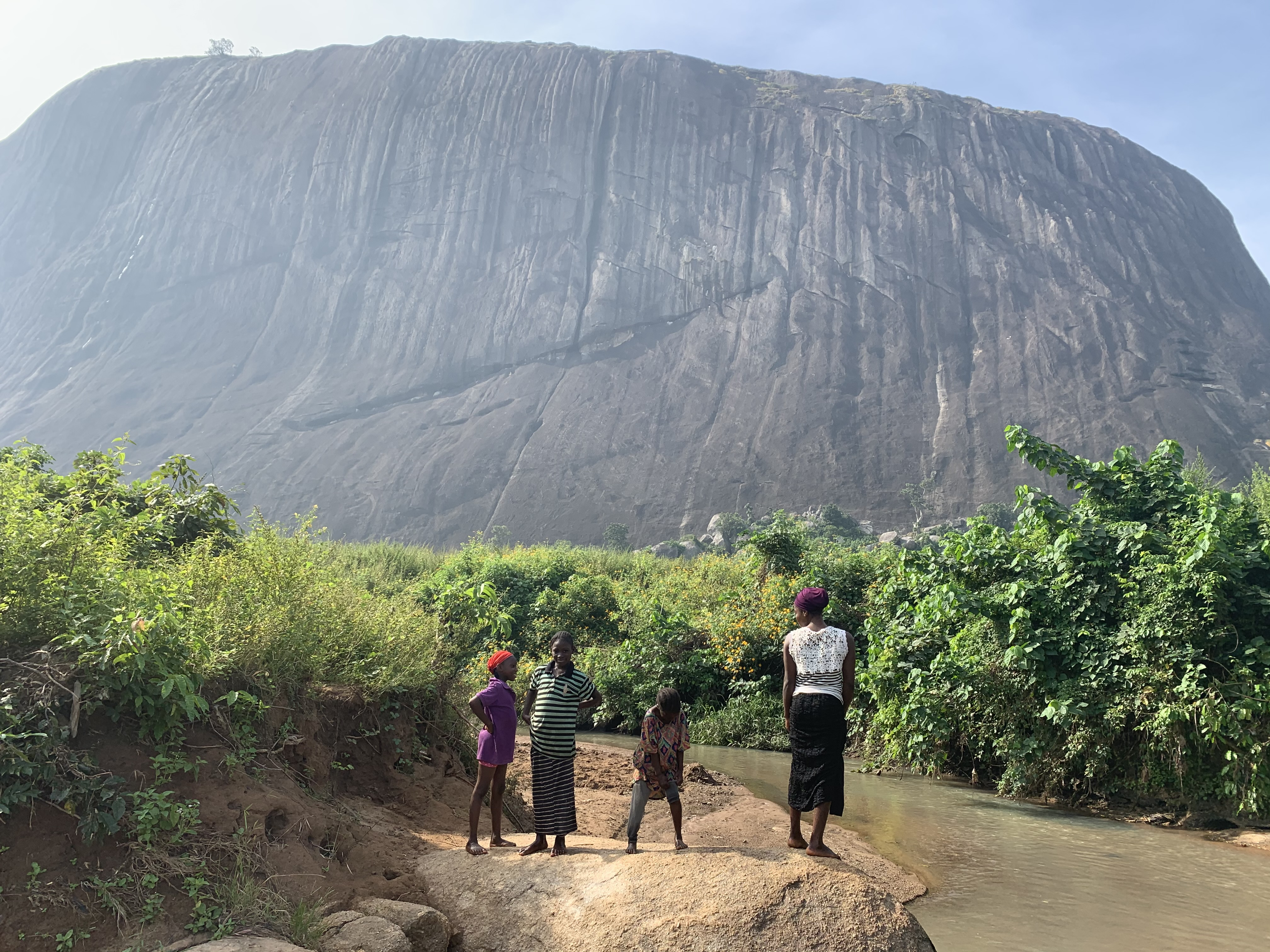
Zuma rock

=== 'Fetish' village ===
In the forest surrounding the rock, there existed a village inhabited by the Koro people, whose chief served as the priest of the rock's deity. This deity was associated with a small rock within the village where sacrifices were believed to occur. The inhabitants of this forest village were said to protect the rock, preventing 'outsiders' from reaching it. There was a prevailing belief that no person had ever reached the rock's base due to superstitions and the fear of a curse. Additionally, it was believed that the village itself was hidden from sight. Historically, the Emir of Abuja sent annual sacrifices—a black ox, a black he-goat, and a black dog—to the guardians of the rock as offerings to the deity. These sacrifices were delivered by villagers from Chachi, who were permitted to interact with the guardians due to their shared tribal connections.

During the 1940s, the District Officer of Abuja, the Sarkin Malamai and Sulaimanu Barau, who later became the Emir of Abuja, joined the then Chief of Zuba to visit the rock and the fetish village "to find out the truth about the rock". Locals strongly advised against the journey, cautioning about curses and refusal by the priest to meet with them. The priest was described as unkempt and naked, while the villagers were known for making human sacrifices to appease their deity. Ignoring these cautions, the party began their journey by first visiting Chachi. The people of the village refused to lead them to the fetish village but agreed to show them the directions there. Upon reaching the village, they encountered welcoming inhabitants, who spoke 'proper' Hausa. Unlike the descriptions they had heard earlier, the priest "was just like other men, properly clothed and shaved as we were". When questioned about human sacrifices, he denied knowledge but admitted it might have been practiced in the past. However, he clarified that animal sacrifices were still practiced and were directed towards their ancestors and the spirits of past priests, not to the rock itself.

=== Modern day ===
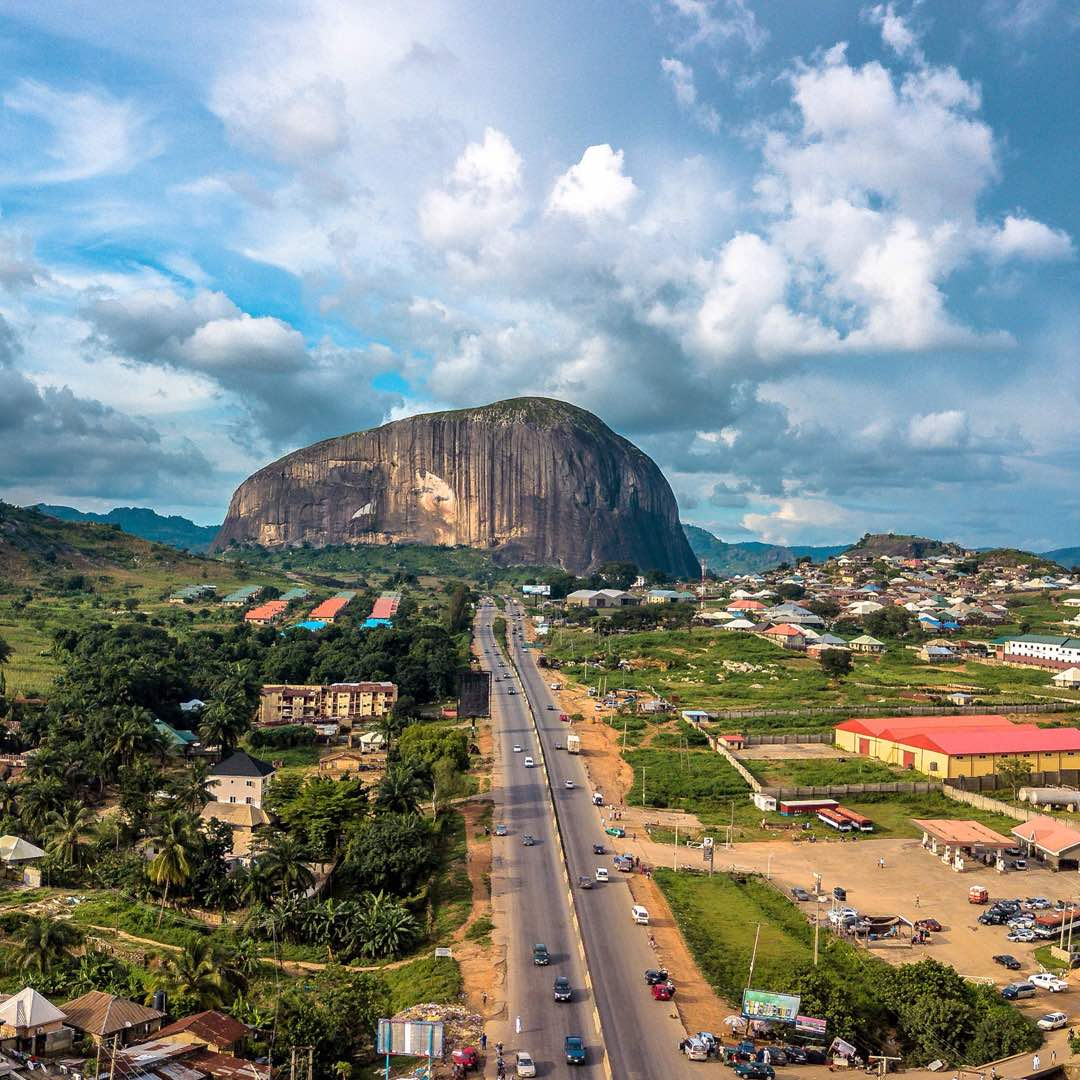

Several centuries down the line, Zuma Rock still has multiple mysterious stories woven around it. Some natives have tales of unseen evil spirits dwelling in the belly of the rock. Others regard it as a den for ritualists, a hidden temple for initiation into the world of the occult and an abode for daredevil armed robbers who seek temporary refuge there whenever they conclude a successful operation and want to share their loot or when security agencies are on their trail.

Not far from the rock is an uncompleted white edifice known as the Zuma Rock Hotel. Some residents of the area believe that the hotel was a haunted zone, hence it was abandoned by its owners. In the course of exploring the area and trying to fix the jig-saw puzzles of the rock, residents living within the radius of the rock gave varying accounts. Some are of the opinion that the evil spirits had relocated, giving people a respite to now begin farming on the parcels of land near the rock. Yet some residents said the evil spirits were still living in the bowels of the rock and do exhibit strange powers especially during odd hours of the night.

== See also ==
- Volcanic plug
