= College of Education and Legal Studies, Nguru =

Higher education institution in Nguru, Nigeria

- Type: Public
- Established: 2000
- Provost: Abba Idris Adam
- Location: Nguru, Yobe State, Nigeria
- Website: Official website

The College of Education and Legal Studies, Nguru is a state government higher education institution located in Nguru, Yobe State, Nigeria. The current Provost is Abba Idris Adam.

== History ==
The College of Education and Legal Studies, Nguru was established in 2000. It was formerly known as Atiku Abubakar College of Legal and Islamic Studies Nguru. The College currently offers 20 NCE and 10 Diploma programmes in Sciences, Law, Education, Management Studies, Art and Social Sciences.

== Courses ==
The institution offers the following courses;

- Islamic Studies
- Hausa
- English
- Economics
- Mathematics
- Integrated Science
- Computer Science
- Social Studies
- Arabic
- Cooperative and Community Development
- Accounts and Audits
- Social Work and Administration
- Peace and Conflict Resolution
- Public Administration
- Business Administration
- Library and Information Science
- Qur’anic Science Education
- Civil Law
- Sharia and Civil Law
