= Akoka =

Suburb of Yaba, Lagos State, Nigeria

Coordinates: 6.5284°N 3.3869°E

Akoka is a suburb of Yaba in Lagos State. It is the site of major tertiary institutions in Lagos including the University of Lagos and Federal College of Education (Technical), Akoka.
