= Federal College of Education, Kontagora =

W.B.Govt. Secondary Education

- Type: Public
- Established: 1978
- Affiliation: Ahmadu Bello University
- Provost: Faruk Rashid Haruna
- Location: Kontagora, Niger State, Nigeria
- Website: Official website

The Federal College of Education, Kontagora is a federal government higher education institution located in Kontagora, Niger State, Nigeria. It is affiliated to Ahmadu Bello University for its degree programmes. The current Provost is Faruk Rashid Haruna.

== History ==
The Federal College of Education, Kontagora was established in 1978.

The geopolitical zone of Nigeria's Niger State is home to the Federal College of Education (FCE) Kontagora. During the military regime of General Olusegun Obasnjo (GCFR), the college was founded in September 1978 as the Federal Advanced Teacher College (FATC). This is in accordance with the recommendations made in the 1970 Sir Eric Ashby report, which was followed by the major act's promulgation, which is known as Federal College of Education decree no. 4 of 1986 and its amendments in decree no. 6 of 1993.

First connected to the University of Ilorin, the college gained independence in 1987 and fell under the direction of the National Commission for College of Education (NCCE). Nigeria Certificate in Education (NCE) teacher preparation is one of the goals of the Federal College of Education, Kontagora, among other institutions.

== Courses ==
The institution offers the following courses;

- Christian Religious Studies
- English Language Education
- Integrated Science Education
- Chemistry Education
- French
- Igbo
- Arabic
- Hausa
- Computer Education
- Mathematics Education
- Agricultural Science
- Business Education
- Home Economics
- Islamic Studies
- Biology
- Physical and Health Education
- Primary Education Studies
- Political Science
- Social Studies

Fine and Applied Art

== Schools ==
- School of science
- School of Language
- School of Vocational studies
- School of Arts and social sciences
- School of General studies

== Affiliation ==
The institution is affiliated with the Ahmadu Bello University to offer programmes leading to Bachelor of Education, (B.Ed.) in;

- Education And Agricultural Science
- Education And English Language
- Education And Mathematics
- Home Economics And Education
- Business Education
- Education And Biology
- Education And Chemistry
- Education & Islamic Studies
- Education And Social Studies
- Education & Arabic
- Physical And Health Education
- Education And Hausa
- Education & Christian Religious Studies
- Education & Physics
- Education And Integrated Science
