= College of Education, Akamkpa =

- Type: Public
- Established: 2008
- Provost: James Archibong
- Location: Akamkpa, Cross River State, Nigeria
- Affiliations: University of Cross River State
- Website: https://crs-coeakamkpa.edu.ng

The College of Education, Akamkpa is a state government higher education institution located in Akamkpa, Cross River State, Nigeria.

The Provost is James Archibong. The Deputy Provost is Ugbong Benedict Igboh while the Registrar is Bernard Okon. The Bursar is Daniel Abip while the Librarian is James Odu.

== History ==
The College was established in 2008.

The present COE is an offshoot of the CRS college of education, Akamkpa. This former college eventually folded up with the emergence of the Cross River University of Technology and until early 2008 served as a university campus of the faculty of education.

By June 2008, Cross River University Faculty of education was relocated to calabar with the view to re-establish a college of education. This materialized when the principal officers led by Prof, A Owan Enoh, were appointed for the new college of education, Akamkpa, in December 2008. The new college was established by the CRS Edict No. 4 promulgate by his Excellency, senator Liyel Imoke, Executive governor of CRS. with CRUTECH, the college is now one of the 2 state-owned tertiary institutions that offer higher but complementary programmes.

The college of education provides the man power needs of the state in the training of highly motivated, diligent and conscientious teachers, especially in the science, for the universal Basic Education (UBE) scheme in the state. The new college of education took off in the 2009/2010 session with 1,372 students for the NCE programme and 300 students for the pre-NCE. Apart from the pre-NCE programme, general and remedial studies, and the center for continuing education, the college has busy academic programmes run by six (6) schools:

- School of Arts and social science
- School of Education
- School of Languages
- School of Science
- School of Vocational and Technical studies
- School of Early childcare and primary education

== Courses ==
The institution offers the following courses;

- English Education
- Chemistry Education
- Geography
- Music
- Biology Education
- Home Economics
- History
- Economics Education
- Education and Mathematics
- Integrated Science Education
- Early Childhood Care Education
- French
- Political Science Education
- Christian Religious Studies
- Agricultural Science and Education

== Librarian ==
The College Librarian is James Odu. He was born on the 6th day of May, 1966 in Bankpor Irruan, (His home town) Boki L.G.A of Cross River State. He had his first Degree in Library Science/History from the University of Nigeria, Nsukka in 1992 where He graduated with second class Honour, (Upper division). He had his master's degree in the University of Calabar in Library and Information Science in 2003 and Ph.D. in Library and Information Science in University of Uyo, in 2012. He joined the services of the University of Calabar in 1997 as graduate assistance. He has published in both Local and Foreign Journal. He is a Member of Nigeria Library Association, Cross River State chapter and has attended several conferences.
