= Imo State College of Education =

College of Education in Nigeria

Coordinates: 5.6229°N 7.3424°E

- Type: Public
- Established: 2010
- Provost: Dr Nwachukwu Chinyere Maryrose
- Location: Ihitte/Uboma, Imo State, Nigeria

The Imo State College of Education is a state government higher education institution located in Ihitte/Uboma, Imo State, Nigeria. The current acting Provost is Dr Nwachukwu Chinyere Maryrose.

== History ==
The Imo State College of Education was established in 2010.

== Courses ==
The institution offers the following courses;

- Economics
- Igbo
- French
- English Education
- Christian Religious Studies
- Computer Science Education
- Environmental Health Technology
- Social Studies
- History
- Special Education
- Political Science Education
