= Federal College of Education, Okene =

Public Institution in Nigeria

- Type: Public
- Established: 1974
- Affiliations: University of Ibadan
- Provost: Umar Hassan
- Location: Okene, Kogi State, Nigeria
- Website: Official website

The Federal College of Education, Okene is a federal government higher education institution located in Okene, kogi State, Nigeria. It is affiliated to University of Ibadan for its degree programmes. The current Provost is Umar Hassan.

== History ==
The Federal College of Education, Okene was established in 1974. It was originally known as Federal Advanced Teachers College, Okene but was later named Federal College of Education, Okene in 1985.

== Courses ==
The institution offers the following courses;

- Economics
- Christian Religious Studies
- Biology
- English
- Agricultural Science
- Chemistry
- Early Childhood Care Education
- French
- Geography
- Guidance and Counseling
- Hausa
- History/Social Studies
- Adult and Non-Formal Education
- Home Economics
- Igbo
- Arabic
- Business Education
- Integrated Science
- Islamic Studies
- Mathematics
- Music
- Primary Education Studies
- Social Studies
- Music
- Physical And Health Education
- Computer Education
- Fine and Applied Arts

== Affiliation ==
The institution is affiliated with the University of Ibadan to offer programmes leading to Bachelor of Education, (B.Ed.) in;

- Education/Biology
- Education/Chemistry
- Human Kinetics (Physical) & Health Education
- Guidance & Counseling
- Education/French
- Education/Mathematics
- Education/Christian Religious Studies
- Education/Islamic Studies
- Education/Social Studies
- Educational Management
- Education/English Language
