= Bilyaminu Othman College of Education =

Higher education in Dass, Bauchi State, Nigeria

Coordinates: 9.95320°N 9.50555°E

- Type: Public
- Established: 2013
- Location: Dass, Bauchi State, Nigeria
- Campus: Rural
- Website: Official website

The Bilyaminu Othman College of Education is a state government higher education institution located in Dass, Bauchi State, Nigeria.

== History ==
The Bilyaminu Othman College of Education was established in 2013.

== Courses ==
The institution offers the following courses;

- Integrated Science Education
- Education and History
- Business Education
- Computer Education
- Education and Economics
- Special Education
- Education and Biology
- Education and English
- Social Studies
- Education and Geography
- Arabic Medium

== Merging with college of education ==
In May 2024 The Bilyaminu Othman College of Education was merged with the college of education technical in Bauchi state.

== See also ==
Academic libraries in Nigeria
