= Alvan Ikoku =

Nigerian educationist, statesman and politician

- Born: Alvan Azinna Ikoku; August 1, 1900; Arochukwu, Nigeria
- Died: November 18, 1971 (aged 71); Aba, Nigeria
- Education: Hope Waddell Training Institution
- Political party: United National Independence Party
- Children: S.G. Ikoku, Chimere, Ekanem, Gloria, Enyinna and Fide

Alvan Azinna Ikoku // (August 1, 1900–November 18, 1971) was a Nigerian educationist, statesman, activist and politician.

== Life ==
Born on August 1, 1900, in Amanagwu Arochukwu, in present-day Abia State, he was educated at Arochukwu Government Primary School from 1911 to 1914. From 1915 to 1920, he attended Hope Waddell College, Calabar where he was a student under James Emmanuel Aggrey and was classmates with Akanu Ibiam and Eyo Eyo Esua. In 1920, he received his first teaching appointment with the Presbyterian Church of Nigeria and the Church of Scotland at Itigidi. Two years later, he became a senior tutor at St. Paul's Teachers' Training College, Awka, Anambra State. While teaching at Awka, Ikoku earned his University of London degree in Philosophy in 1928 through its external program.

In 1932, Ikoku established a Co-Educational Secondary School in West Africa: the Aggrey Memorial Secondary School, located in Arochukwu and named after his mentor James E.K. Aggrey, an eminent Ghanaian educationist. In 1946, after several constitutional changes allowing more Nigerians in the legislative chambers, he was nominated to the Eastern Nigeria House of Assembly and assigned to the ministry of education. In 1947, he became part of the Legislative Council in Lagos as one of three representatives of the Eastern Region.

Ikoku fostered considerable government interest in the Nigeria Union of Teachers (NUT), becoming instrumental in the Legislative Council's acceptance of 44 NUT proposals amending various educational ordinances. He did encounter resistance through much of the 1950s, when the Colonial Government repeatedly rejected his NUT recommendations to introduce uniform education in Nigeria. After national independence, Ikoku and his union were vindicated, when these recommendations became the basis for education policy in the new nation.

In 1962, he called for an 'Education Bill of Rights' for primary school education to be free for six years nationwide in Nigeria. This was later accepted by the Federal Military Government as from 1976. Today free education to all primary school has been granted. Dr Ikoku still remains a great icon in Nigerian academic and educational development and a notable educationist in Nigeria history.

Upon retiring from government politics, Ikoku served on various educational bodies in Nigeria. Ikoku was a Council Member of WAEC: West African Examinations Council and Governing Council Member at University of Ibadan; as well as Chairman: Board of Governors: Aviation Training Centre.

== Honours ==
Honours for his contribution to education in Nigeria include an honorary Doctorate in Law (1965) at a special convocation of the University of Ibadan, the establishment of the Alvan Ikoku Federal College of Education, a major road, Alvan Ikoku Way, in Maitama, Abuja (Capital of Nigeria) and his commemoration on a bill of Nigerian currency, the Ten Naira note. He died on November 18, 1971.

He is also featured in the 10 Naira banknote since 1979.
