= Moje College of Education =

Government higher education institution

Coordinates: 8°6′10.25″N 4°42′13.29″E

Moje College Of Education
- Type: Public
- Established: 2017
- Location: Erin Ile, Kwara State, Nigeria
- Website: Official website

The Moje College Of Education is a state government higher education institution located in Erin Ile, Kwara State, Nigeria.

== History ==
The Moje College Of Education was established in 2017.

== Courses ==
The institution offers the following courses;

- Economics
- Computer Education
- Geography
- French
- Political Science
- Biology
- Social Studies
- Islamic Studies
- Christian Religious Studies
- English
- Yoruba
- Arabic
- Primary Education Studies
- Integrated Science
