= College of Education, Billiri =

Higher education institute in Nigeria

College of Education, Billiri (COE Billiri)
- Type: Public
- Established: 2012
- Provost: Langa Hassan
- Location: Billiri, Gombe State, Nigeria; 9°54′45″N 11°12′36″E

The College of Education, Billiri also known as COE Billiri is a state government higher education institution located in Billiri, Gombe State, Nigeria. The current provost is Dr Bertha Abdu Danja.

== History ==
The College of Education, Billiri was established in 2012 during governor Dr. Ibrahim Hassan Dankwabo's regime.

== Courses ==
The institution offers the following courses:

- Christian Religious Studies
- Integrated Science and Education
- Economics
- Computer Science Education
- History
- Biology Education
- Education and Mathematics
- Political Science
- Primary Education Studies
- Special Education
- Arabic
- Education and French
- Early Childhood Care Education
- Education and English
- Social Studies
- Cultural and Creative Art
- Islamic Studies
- Hausa
- Education and Geography
