= Zuba, Nigeria =

Community in Federal Capital Territory, Nigeria

Zuba
- Town
- Zuba
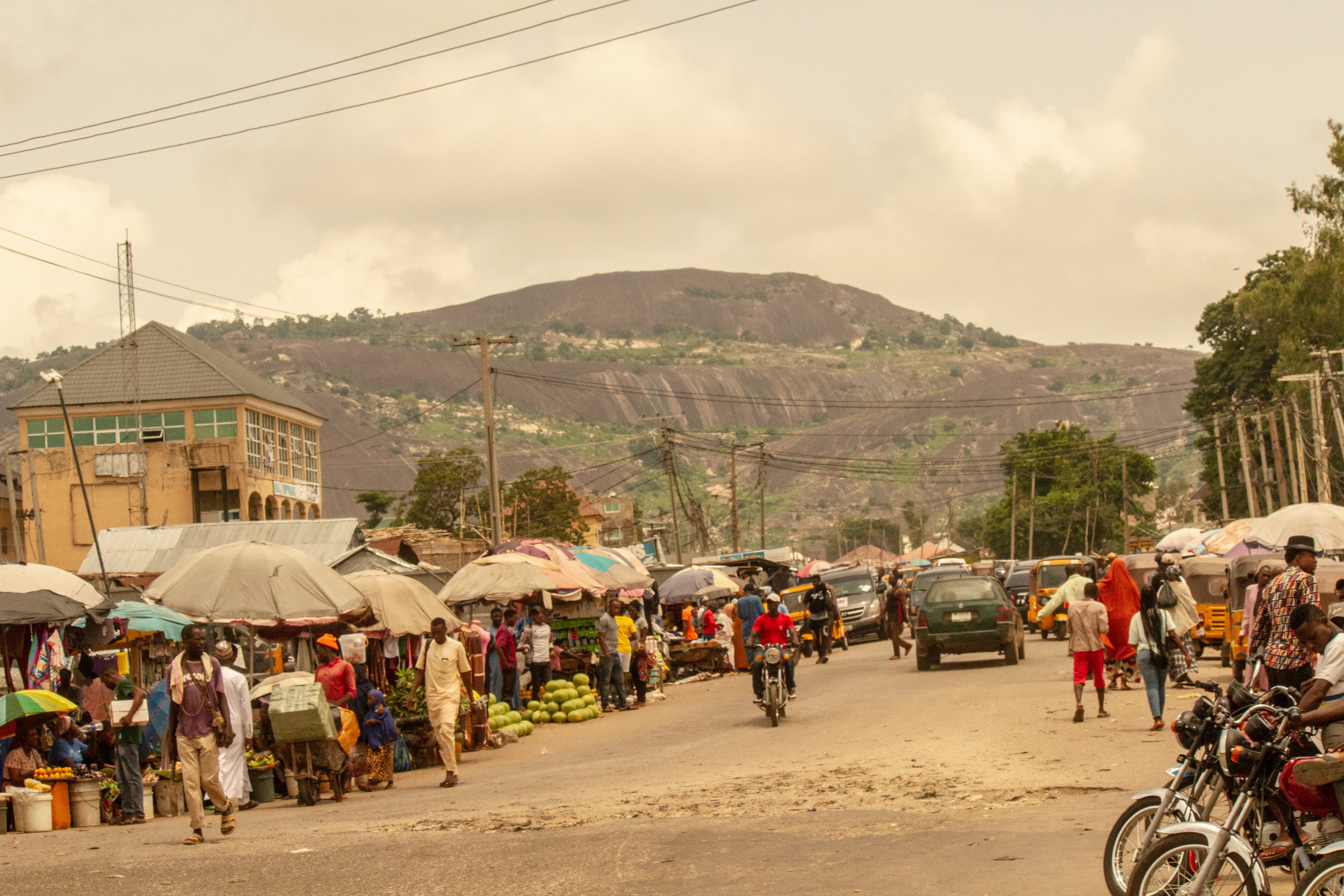
- Mini Market at Zuba

- Map showing Zuba location in Nigeria
- Coordinates: 9°5′47″N 7°12′46″E
- State: Abuja
- Local Government Area: Gwagwalada
- Time zone: UTC+1 (WAT)

Zuba is a community in Gwagwalada Local Government Area of the Federal Capital Territory (FCT), Nigeria. It is located in the border of Abuja central city and shares the same boundary Madalla with Niger State. Other than being the gateway to Abuja, Zuba is also on a primary highway that connects to Kaduna-Kano as well Kogi State, to major cities of the south.

Language

Koro is the native language of Zuba people. However, being a commercial and transit area, it records a large number of other tribes like Hausa, Yoruba, Igbo, Igala, Ebira, Nupe etc.
