= Jina language =

Chadic language spoken in Cameroon

Jina
- Zina
- Native to: Cameroon
- Native speakers: 1,500 (2004)
- Language family: Afro-Asiatic: Chadic; Biu–Mandara; East–Central; Mida’a; Jina
- Dialects: Muxule

Language codes
- ISO 639-3: jia
- Glottolog: jina1244

Jina (Zina) is an Afroasiatic language of Cameroon. The Muxule variety may be a distinct language.

Jina is spoken in Zina commune, located just to the south of Logone-Birni commune. Muxule is spoken in a few villages to the north of Logone-Birni (department of Logone-et-Chari, Far North Region) by 1,500 speakers. The people of Zina claim to understand Lagwan and Munjuk better than Muxule.

== Phonology ==
Consonants
	Labial	Alveolar	Palatal	Velar		Glottal
	Labial	Alveolar	Palatal	plain	labialized	Glottal
Plosive	p b	t d	c ɟ	k g	kʷ gʷ	ʔ
Ejective		s’		k’		
Implosive	ɓ	ɗ				
Fricative	f v	s z		x ɣ	xʷ ɣʷ	
Nasal	m	n		ŋ	ŋʷ	
Approximant	w	l, r	j			

Jina is analysed as only having two phonemic vowels; /a/ and /ə/.
