= Tsuvan language =

Afro-Asiatic language spoken in Cameroon

Tsuvan
- Native to: Cameroon
- Region: Far North Province
- Native speakers: (2,300 cited 2000)
- Language family: Afro-Asiatic: Chadic; Biu–Mandara; Bata (A.8); Tsuvan

Language codes
- ISO 639-3: tsh
- Glottolog: tsuv1243

Tsuvan (also known as Matsuvan, Motsuvan, Terki, Telaki, Teleki, Tchede) is an Afro-Asiatic language spoken in Cameroon in Far North Province.

Tsuvan is spoken in the village (in fact, the massif) of Téléki by a group known as the Tchédé, who are often classified with the Gude. It is spoken east of the canton of Tchévi, commune of Bourrha, department of Mayo-Tsanaga, Far North Region. Like Sharwa, it is also spoken the Northern Region, in the department of Mayo-Louti (commune of Mayo-Oulo). There are 2,300 speakers.
