= Mada (disambiguation) =

Mada is a term from Hindu theology and mythology.

Mada, MADA, or variants may refer to:

- Acetyl-S-ACP:malonate ACP transferase (MadA), an enzyme
- Mada (beetle), a genus of insects in the family Coccinellidae
- Mada (Buddhism), an unwholesome factor in Buddhism
- Mada, a village in the Balșa commune in Hunedoara County, Transylvania, Romania
- Mada language, Niger-Congo
- Maɗa language, Afro-Asiatic
- Monash Art, Design and Architecture, a faculty at Monash University, Melbourne, Australia
  - MADA Gallery, an exhibition space at the faculty
- Palestinian Center for Development and Media Freedoms, Palestinian press freedom organization
- Saudi Payments Network, or mada, the major and only payment system in Saudi Arabia
