= Mbuko language =

Afro-Asiatic language of Cameroon

Mbuko
- Native to: Cameroon
- Region: Far North Region
- Native speakers: 15,000 (2008)
- Language family: Afro-Asiatic: Chadic; Biu–Mandara; Wandala–Mafa; Mafa (A.5); Northeast; Mbuko

Language codes
- ISO 639-3: mqb
- Glottolog: mbuk1243

Mbuko is an Afro-Asiatic language spoken in the canton of Doulek, Méri subdivision, department of Diamaré, and also in parts of the canton of Serawa, Tokombéré subdivision, department of Mayo-Sava, in the Far North Region of Cameroon.

The Mbuko (6,700 speakers) traditionally inhabit the Mbuko massif, located east of Meri. They also live in the neighbouring plain of Mayo-Ranéo (in the canton of Doulek, arrondissement of Meri, department of Diamaré, Far North Region).
