= Jimi language (Cameroon) =

Chadic language spoken in Cameroon

Jimi
- Jimjimən
- Native to: Cameroon
- Region: Far North Province
- Native speakers: 10,000 (2019)
- Language family: Afro-Asiatic: Chadic; Biu–Mandara; Bata (A.8); Jimi

Language codes
- ISO 639-3: jim
- Glottolog: jimi1254
- ELP: Jimi (Cameroon)

Jimi (Djimi), also known as Jimjimən and 'Um Falin, is a Chadic language spoken in Cameroon in Far North Province on the Nigerian border in and around Bourrha. Dialects are Djimi, Jimo, Malabu, Wadi, and Zumo.

The Gude use the term Fali to refer to the Jimi, which means 'slave' in several languages of the area. It is also used to refer to other ethnic groups, such as the Fali of Mubi, Fali of Mucella, and Fali of Jilvu.

Jimjimén is spoken in Bourrha, Mayo-Tsanaga department, Far North Region.
