= Fali =

Fali may refer to:

== Language ==
- Fali languages (Cameroon), a Niger–Congo language or languages of Cameroon
- Fali of Baissa, an unclassified Niger–Congo language of Nigeria

Various Chadic languages of Nigeria:

- Fali of Mubi
- Fali of Kirya
- Fali of Mijilu
- Fali of Jilbu

== People ==
- Fali people
- Rafael Brieva Primo (born 1983), Spanish former footballer
- Rafael Romero Serrano (born 1986), Spanish former footballer
- Rafael Jiménez Jarque (born 1993), Spanish footballer
- Fali Sam Nariman, Indian lawyer
- Fali Homi Major, former chief of the Indian Air Force
- Rohinton Fali Nariman, former judge of the Supreme Court of India
- A tribal name amongst the Margi people of Borno State, Nigeria
