= Zulgo-Gemzek language =

Chadic language spoken in Cameroon

Zulgo-Gemzek
- Native to: Cameroon
- Region: Far North Province
- Native speakers: 26,000 (2002)
- Language family: Afro-Asiatic: Chadic; Biu–Mandara; Wandala–Mafa; Mafa (A.5); South (b); Zulgo-Gemzek
- Dialects: Zəlgwa-Minew; Gemzek

Language codes
- ISO 639-3: gnd
- Glottolog: zulg1242

Zulgo-Gemzek is an Afro-Asiatic language spoken in northern Cameroon. Dialects are Gemzek, Mineo, and Zulgo (Zəlgwa). Blench (2006) considers Zəlgwa-Minew and Gemzek to be distinct languages.

Zulgo-Gemzek only possesses two vowel phonemes: ə and a, one of the smallest vowel inventories of any language in the world.

== Phonology ==
=== Consonants ===
Consonants
		Labial	Alveolar	Palatal	Velar	Glottal
Implosive		ɓ	ɗ			
Plosive	tenuis	p	t		k	ʔ
Plosive	voiced	b	d		g	
Affricate	tenuis		ts			
Affricate	voiced		dz			
Fricative	voiceless	f	s			h
Fricative	voiced	v	z			
Lateral fricative	voiceless		ɬ			
Lateral fricative	voiced		ɮ			
Nasal		m	n		ŋ	
Approximant		w	l	j		

=== Vowels ===
Vowels
	Central
Mid	ə
Open	a

=== Tones ===
Zulgo-Gemzek has three phonemic tones: high, mid, and low.

== Dialects ==
According to the Linguistic Atlas of Cameroon (2012), Zelgwa and Minew make up a single language called Zelgwa Minew. The Zelgwa and Minew varieties are very close to each other. Gemzek is rather different from these two languages and is treated as a separate language by the Linguistic Atlas of Cameroon.

The Zelgwa, as well as the Gemzek, inhabit the massifs of the same name that form the eastern edge of the Mandara Mountains, north of Meri, as well as the neighboring plain to the east and the plateau to the west (Sérawa canton, Tokombéré commune, Mayo-Sava department, Far North Region). The Minew inhabit the western edge of the Mandara Mountains (Gaboua canton, Koza commune, Mayo-Tsanaga department, Far North Region), some 10 kilometers from Sérawa.

Gemzek and Zelgwa are two distinct languages, although there is some mutual intelligibility between them. The Gemzek (8,000-10,000 speakers) inhabit the Gemzek massif, which forms the eastern edge of the Mandara Mountains north of Méri, as well as the adjacent plain to the east and the plateau to the west (Sérawa canton, Tokombéré commune, Mayo-Sava department, Far North Region).
