= Muyang language =

Afro-Asiatic language of Cameroon

Muyang
- Native to: Cameroon
- Region: Far North Province
- Native speakers: 30,000 (2007)
- Language family: Afro-Asiatic: Chadic; Biu–Mandara; Wandala–Mafa; Mafa (A.5); South (a); Muyang

Language codes
- ISO 639-3: muy
- Glottolog: muya1243

Muyang is an Afro-Asiatic language spoken in and near the town of Tokombéré in the department of Mayo-Sava in northern Cameroon.

The Muyang (15,000 speakers) traditionally inhabit the Muyang massif and the neighboring massifs of Mougouba, Gouadagouada, and Palbarar, which are inselbergs in the plain northeast of Tokombéré (in Mouyengué and Palbara-Goudouba cantons of Tokombéré arrondissement, Mayo-Sava department, Far North Region).
