= Maɗa language =

Chadic language spoken in Cameroon

Maɗa
- Native to: Cameroon
- Region: Far North Region, Cameroon
- Native speakers: (17,000 cited 1982)
- Language family: Afro-Asiatic: Chadic; Biu–Mandara; Wandala–Mafa; Mafa (A.5); South (a); Maɗa

Language codes
- ISO 639-3: mxu
- Glottolog: mada1293

Maɗa is a Chadic language spoken in northern Cameroon. It has 17,000 speakers.

The Maɗa (17,000 speakers) inhabit the Maɗa massif, on the eastern edge of the Mandara Mountains, between the Wuzlam massif to the north and the Zélgwa massif to the south. They live in the canton of Madakalkoss, arrondissement of Tokombéré, department of Mayo-Sava, Far North Region.

== Vowels ==
Maɗa has seven vowels.

| | Front | Middle | Back |
|---|---|---|---|
| High | i | | u |
| Middle | e ø | ə | o |
| Low | | a | |

== Consonants ==
Maɗa has 25 consonants in total, including implosives, lateral fricatives, and prenasalized stops.

| | | Labial | Labiodental | Alveolar | Palatal | Velar | Velar | Glottal | Rounded Glottal |
|---|---|---|---|---|---|---|---|---|---|
| Stop | Tenuis | p | | t | | k | kʷ | | |
| | Voiced | b | | d | | g | ɡʷ | | |
| | Implosive | ɓ | | ɗ | | | | | |
| | Prenasalized | ᵐb | | ⁿd | | ᵑg | | | |
| Nasal | | m | | n | | ŋ | | | |
| Fricative | Tenuis | | f | s | | | | h | hʷ |
| Fricative | Voiced | | v | z | | | | | |
| Lateral fricative | Tenuis | | | ɬ | | | | | |
| Lateral fricative | Voiced | | | ɮ | | | | | |
| Affricate | Tenuis | | | ts | | | | | |
| Affricate | Voiced | | | dz | | | | | |
| Affricate | Prenasalized | | | ⁿdz | | | | | |
| Rhotic | | | | r | | | | | |
| Approximate | | w | | | j | | | | |
| Lateral approximate | | | | l | | | | | |
