= Moloko language =

Afro-Asiatic language spoken in Cameroon

Moloko
- Məlokwo
- Native to: Cameroon
- Region: Far North Province
- Native speakers: (8,500 cited 1992)
- Language family: Afro-Asiatic: Chadic; Biu–Mandara; Wandala–Mafa; Mafa (A.5); South (a); Moloko

Language codes
- ISO 639-3: mlw
- Glottolog: molo1266
- ELP: Baka (Far North Region, Cameroon)

Moloko is spoken in northern Cameroon; Cameroon is highlighted on this map.

Moloko (Məlokwo) is an Afro-Asiatic language spoken in northern Cameroon.

The highly endangered Baka is either a dialect or a closely related language.

The Melokwo (8,500 speakers) traditionally inhabit the Moloko massif, an inselberg isolated in the plain, east of the Mandara Mountains, between the Mayo-Mangafé River and Mayo-Ranéo River. They live in the village of Mokyo and the surrounding areas of Makalingay canton, Tokombéré arrondissement, Mayo-Sava department.

According to local oral history, the Moloko communities are made up of three distinct ethnic groups, rather than a singular one. During the Fulani invasions of the 19th century, these groups sought refuge near the Moloko mountain, where they would eventually come to speak the same language.

== Usage ==
A small number of Moloko speakers speak only one language. Most will speak three to five other languages. Those with several years of education also speak French. Men often marry women from neighboring language groups, so families may be multilingual, but the spoken language in the home is often the father's language. Friends often switch languages when talking, perhaps when talking in different areas, but also just to bond. Transactions in the market may be conducted in the language of trade, but people prefer to bargain in the language of the seller if possible. Language viability in Moloko is only at risk in communities where Moloko is not the dominant language, especially in cities such as Maroua or Yaoundé. In cities, children grow up in communities where there are many different languages, so they tend to speak Fulfulde. In these kinds of places, there is a risk that Moloko will disappear in the next generation. Otherwise, where Melokwo people congregate, Moloko language use is strong in every age group and in every area of family life.

== Phonology ==
=== Vowels ===
There exists one underlying vowel in Moloko, /a/, with four surface realizations. The insertion, or epenthesis, of a schwa, /ə/, is required to break up clusters of consonants lacking a vowel. This epenthetic sound accounts for an additional six possible surface realizations.

The status of the epenthetic, as to whether it should be considered its own vowel, is contested. Some analyses consider the epenthetic to be its own unique vowel, thus making Moloko a two-vowel system.

The phonetic realization of both phonemes can vary depending on a number of factors: roundedness, labialization (roundedness), palatalization, or closeness to certain consonants. Each phoneme and its corresponding allophones are listed below.

Moloko vowel realization
	/a/	/ə/
No variation	[a]	[ə]
Rounded	[ɔ]	[ʊ]
Palatalized	[ɛ]	[ɪ]
Adjacent to [j]	[a]	[i]
Adjacent to [w]	[a]	[u]
Adjacent to an inherent labialized velar or /j/	[œ]	[ø]

=== Consonants ===
Despite only having one vowel phoneme, there are 32 consonants in Moloko.

Moloko phonemes
		Labial	Alveolar		Palatal	Velar/Glottal	
		Labial	plain	sib.	Palatal	plain	lab.
Nasal		m	n			(ŋ)	
Plosive/ Affricate	voiceless	p	t	ts	(tʃ)	k	kʷ
Plosive/ Affricate	voiced	b	d	dz	(dʒ)	g	gʷ
Plosive/ Affricate	prenasal	ᵐb	ⁿd	ⁿz	(ⁿʒ)	ᵑg	ᵑgʷ
Plosive/ Affricate	implosive	ɓ	ɗ				
Fricative	voiceless	f	ɬ	s	(ʃ)	h	hʷ
Fricative	voiced	v	ɮ	z	(ʒ)		
Approximant			l		j		w
Flap		ⱱ	ɾ				

Allophones are noted in parentheses. The alveolar sibilants /s z ts dz ⁿz/ can be realized as postalveolar sibilants [ʃ ʒ tʃ dʒ ⁿʒ] and the alveolar nasal /n/ is realized as velar [ŋ] word-finally. The glottal fricative /h/ may be realized as velar [x], but the labialized fricative /hʷ/ does not appear to be realized as velar [xʷ].

== Morphology ==
=== Noun morphology ===
Moloko nouns are placed at the head of a noun phrase. No case markers are found in Moloko’s morphology. Instead, case markers are indicated through word order and the use of markings in verbs and adpositions (prepositions and postpositions).

Some characteristics of Moloko nouns are:

- Nouns can be pluralized using =ahaj.
- Possessive pronouns may be used.
- Nouns are able to be counted.
- The derivational morpheme ga modifies a noun into an adjective.

Proper nouns in Moloko are commonly compounding, but may also be morphologically simple. People's names often have something to do with the circumstances or events around the time when they were born. A certain person’s name could be a noun, verb, compound, prepositional phrase, or even an entire clause. The names of twins are even determined based on their birth order.

=== Verb morphology ===
Verbs in Moloko are formed through a partially agglutinative process. To form a verb, prefixes and suffixes are attached to a consonantal skeleton. The resulting “verb complex” can be several phonological words in length. Differences in tense are expressed through alteration of the subject prefix.

Verbs have a spatial frame of reference in addition to a temporal frame of reference. Both of these can be defined by the speaker through changing the vowel realization, changing tone, or using verbal extensions.
