= Mpade language =

Chadic language spoken in Cameroon and Chad

Mpadə
- Native to: Cameroon, Chad
- Region: Far North Province, Cameroon; west Chad
- Native speakers: 16,000 in Cameroon (2004)
- Language family: Afro-Asiatic: Chadic; Biu–Mandara; Kotoko (B.1); North; Mpadə

Language codes
- ISO 639-3: mpi
- Glottolog: mpad1242 Mpade ngal1301 Ngala

Mpadə is an Afro-Asiatic language spoken in northern Cameroon and southwestern Chad. Dialects are Bodo, Biamo, Digam, Mpade (Makari), Shoe (Shewe), and Woulki.

The language is sometimes known as Makari, after one of the towns where it is spoken. Ngala further west (as described by Barth) once spoke a dialect similar to Makari, but it was moribund by the 1920s, the people having shifted to Kanuri.

== Distribution ==
In Cameroon, Mpade is spoken throughout the northern end of the Logone-et-Chari department (Far North Region), adjacent to Lake Chad and centered on Makari (the northern part of Makari arrondissement as well as in Fotokol and Hilé Alifa arrondissements, and the northern part of Goulfey arrondissement). It is also spoken in Chad and Nigeria, it has a total population of 12,000 speakers (SIL 2000).

== Phonology ==
=== Consonants ===
Mpade has the following consonants.

		Labial	Coronal	Palatal	Velar		Glottal
		Labial	Coronal	Palatal	Plain	Labialized	Glottal
Stops and affricates	Voiceless	p	t	tʃ	k	kʷ	
Stops and affricates	Voiced	b	d	dʒ	ɡ	ɡʷ	
Stops and affricates	Ejective		tsʼ	tʃʼ	kʼ	kʷʼ	
Stops and affricates	Implosive	ɓ	ɗ				
Stops and affricates	Prenasalized	mb	nd		ŋɡ		
Fricatives	Voiceless	f	s	ʃ			h
Fricatives	Voiced		z				
Nasals		m	n				
Lateral			l				
Trill			r				
Semivowels				j		w	

=== Vowels ===
Mpade has the following vowels.

	front	back unrounded	back rounded
High	i	ɨ	u
Non-High	e	a	o
