= Jera language =

Jera may be:

- Jere language (as in Ethnologue 13)
- Jara language
