= NGX =

NGX or ngx can refer to:

- Nigerian Exchange Group, a stock exchange in Nigeria
- Nggwahyi language, a threatened language spoken in Nigeria, by ISO 639-3 code
- Manang Airport, an airport in Manang, Nepal, by IATA code
- Neo Geo X, a brand of hybrid video game console
- Nueva Generation Xtrema, which Mexican wrestler Tigre Uno previously worked for
- Nigerian Global, an airline based in Nigeria, by ICAO code; see List of airline codes (N)
- National Gallery X, a British museum exhibit co-directed by Ali Hossaini
