= CUV =

CUV may refer to:

- Crossover utility vehicle, or crossover SUV, a motor vehicle combining features of a sport utility vehicle and a passenger car
- Chinese Union Version, a translation of the Bible into Chinese
- Cuvok language (ISO 639-3 code: cuv)

== See also ==
- CUVS, Central Utah Vocational School, a former name of Utah Valley University, United States
- CUVS, or Chinese Union Version in Simplfied Chinese
