= Ga'anda language =

Afro-Asiatic language spoken in Nigeria

Ga'anda
- Ga, Ganda
- Native to: Nigeria
- Region: Adamawa State, Borno State
- Ethnicity: Ga'anda people
- Native speakers: (43,000 cited 1992)
- Language family: Afro-Asiatic: Chadic; Biu–Mandara; Tera languages (A.1); Ga'anda
- Dialects: Ga’anda; Gabin; Fartata
- Writing system: Latin

Language codes
- ISO 639-3: gqa
- Glottolog: gaan1243

Ga'anda (also called Ga) is a language spoken in northeastern Nigeria, particularly in Adamawa State. Its principal area is associated with Gombi Local Government Area. The language belongs to the Biu–Mandara branch of the Afro-Asiatic language family.

Ga'anda has been documented in linguistic research since at least the early twentieth century. Its grammatical structure was examined extensively by Roxana Ma Newman in her 1971 doctoral dissertation, while her separate study of the language investigated its tonal system.

== Classification ==
Ga'anda belongs to the Chadic branch of the Afro-Asiatic language family and is classified within the Biu–Mandara branch. Newman (1971) identifies Hona, Tera and Jara as its closest linguistic relatives, describing Ga'anda and these languages as forming a distinct cluster within Biu–Mandara. Roger Blench's An Atlas of Nigerian Languages places Ga'anda within the Tera group of the Biu–Mandara branch. The language is identified by the ISO 639-3 code gqa and the Glottocode gaan1243.

== Geographic distribution ==
Ga'anda is spoken in northeastern Nigeria, principally in Adamawa State. Its traditional centre is in Gombi Local Government Area. Other areas in Adamawa State where Ga'anda speakers have been reported include Song, Guyuk and Mubi Local Government Areas. During Newman field research identified Ga'anda, Gabin and Boga language as principal villages associated with the language. She recorded the local pronunciation of Ga'anda as kààndà, Gabin as kábùn and Boga as pòkà. Ga'anda speakers have also been reported in Biu Local Government Area of Borno State, which borders Adamawa State. These locations are documented in the geographical information associated with the language in Ethnologue.

In addition to these areas, Ga'anda speakers are reported to live in different parts of Nigeria, including outside their traditional homeland. However, available sources do not provide a reliable list of all the towns and communities where migrant Ga'anda speakers currently reside. The language is therefore associated primarily with Adamawa State, with documented speaker communities extending into Borno State and other parts of Nigeria.

== History and ocumentation ==
One of the earliest published linguistic records associated with Ga'anda appeared in Charles K. Meek's 1931 work, Tribal Studies in Northern Nigeria. The second volume contains a section on the Gabin language, including a vocabulary, together with an appendix containing a short vocabulary of the Boga variety.

Later, Newman conducted linguistic fieldwork on Ga'anda, beginning in 1965. Her principal research was undertaken in 1969, with further work in 1970. The research resulted in her doctoral dissertation, A Case Grammar of Ga'anda, submitted to the University of California, Los Angeles, in 1971. Newman's dissertation provided a detailed description of Ga'anda syntax, including its verb system, noun phrases, sentence construction, negation and other grammatical features.
