= Parkwa language =

Chadic language spoken in Cameroon

Parkwa
- Podoko
- Native to: Cameroon
- Native speakers: (30,000 cited 1993)
- Language family: Afro-Asiatic: Chadic; Biu–Mandara; Wandala–Mafa; Wandala (A.4); Parkwa

Language codes
- ISO 639-3: pbi
- Glottolog: park1239

Parkwa (Parəkwa), also Podoko, is an Afro-Asiatic language of Cameroon.

The Parekwa traditionally inhabit the Parekwa massifs, located to the west and southwest of Mora, Cameroon, in the cantons of Gouvaka, Godigong, and Oudjila (Mora commune, Mayo-Sava department, Far North Region). However, like all the ethnic groups of the Mandara Mountains, the Parekwa have spread widely to the surrounding plains and towns. They number about 30,000 speakers.
