= Musgu language =

Afro-Asiatic language spoken in Cameroon and Chad

Musgu
- Mulwi
- Native to: Cameroon, Chad
- Ethnicity: Musgum
- Native speakers: (160,000 cited 1993–2005)
- Language family: Afro-Asiatic: Chadic; Biu–Mandara; East–Central; Munjuk (B.2); Musgu
- Dialects: Mpus; Beege (Jafga); Vulum (Mulwi); Ngilemong; Luggoy; Maniling; Muzuk
- Writing system: Latin

Language codes
- ISO 639-3: mug
- Glottolog: musg1254

Musgu is a cluster of closely related language varieties of the Biu–Mandara subgroup of the Chadic languages spoken in Cameroon and Chad. The endonym is Mulwi. Blench (2006) classifies the three varieties as separate languages. Speakers of the extinct related language Muskum have switched to one of these.

== Names ==
Muzuk is another name for the language. Another term, Mousgoum, is not used by the speakers themselves.

== Munjuk languages ==
Munjuk languages:

- Munjuk
  - Muzuk
  - Beege
  - Mpus
  - Vulum

Munjuk, from manjakay (H. Tourneux), refers to the a group of four related languages, not only Muzuk. Munjuk languages are spoken in northern Mayo-Danay Department (arrondissements of Maga, Yele, and Kai-Kai in the Far North Region).

Beege and Mpus are found in the flood plains of the Logone River, in (Logone-et-Chari department, Zina district); Diamaré department (Bogo district). Beege is found in the south (Djafga and Begué) and Mpus in the north (in Pouss). Vulum is found mainly in Chad.

== Phonology ==
=== Consonants ===
		Labial	Alveolar		Palatal	Velar	Glottal
		Labial	plain	lateral	Palatal	Velar	Glottal
Nasal		m	n		ɲ	ŋ	
Stop/ Affricate	voiceless	p	t		tʃ	k	
Stop/ Affricate	voiced	b	d		dʒ	ɡ	
Stop/ Affricate	prenasal	ᵐb	ⁿd		ⁿdʒ	ᵑɡ	
Stop/ Affricate	implosive	ɓ	ɗ				
Fricative	voiceless	f	s	ɬ		(x)	h
Fricative	voiced	v	z	ɮ			
Approximant		w		l	j		
Trill			r				

- Sounds /tʃ, dʒ/ and prenasal sounds /ᵐb, ⁿd, ⁿdʒ, ᵑɡ/, may occur across different dialects.
- /h/ can be heard as either glottal [h] or velar [x] among dialects.
- Sounds /b, k, ɡ/ occur as labialized [bʷ, kʷ, ɡʷ] when preceding a glide /w/.
- A glottal stop [ʔ] may also occur in different positions, but its phonemic status is unclear.

=== Vowels ===
	Front	Central	Back
Close	i		u
Mid	e	ə	o
Open		a	

- Other sounds as /y, ø/ may occur across different dialects.
