= Cuvok language =

Afro-Asiatic language of northern Cameroon

Cuvok
- Native to: Cameroon
- Region: Far North Province
- Native speakers: 13,500 (2021)
- Language family: Afro-Asiatic: Chadic; Biu–Mandara; Wandala–Mafa; Mafa (A.5); South (d); Cuvok

Language codes
- ISO 639-3: cuv
- Glottolog: cuvo1236

Cuvok (French: Tchouvok) is an Afro-Asiatic language spoken in northern Cameroon.

Cuvok is spoken by about 5,000 speakers (ALCAM 1983) in and around Tchouvok, near Zamay (Mokolo commune, Mayo-Tsanaga department), Far North Region. Cuvok is about as closely related to Mefele (especially the Muhura dialect) as North Mofu is to South Mofu.

Cuvok's vowel inventory only contains two phonemes: ə and a, one of the smallest of any language.
