= SWQ =

SWQ or swq may refer to:

- ICAO code for iAero Airways, a defunct United States charter airline
- ISO 639-3 code for Sharwa language, Far North Province, Cameroon
- IATA code for Sultan Muhammad Kaharuddin III Airport, Sumbawa Besar, Indonesia
- Postal code for Swieqi, Malta
