= Maslam =

Maslam may be,

- Maslam language
- Maslam ibn Ahmed al-Majriti
