= MXF =

MXF or mxf may refer to:

- Material Exchange Format, a container format for professional digital video and audio media
- MXF, the IATA and FAA LID code for Maxwell Air Force Base, Alabama, United States
- mxf, the ISO 639-3 code for Malgbe language, Cameroon and Chad
