= Zumu language =

Zumu or Zumo may refer to:

- Bata language
- Jimi language (Cameroon),
- Jimi language (Nigeria),

all Chadic. It is the last which is generally considered a separate language.
