= FKK =

FKK may refer to:

- Freikörperkultur (FKK), a German naturist social movement and health culture
- FKK sauna clubs, a type of German prostitution club that erroneously or falsely refers to itself as the German FKK 'Freikörperkultur' naturist culture
- Falkirk High railway station, in Scotland
- Kirya-Konzəl language, spoken in Nigeria
- Futbolnyy Klub Krasnodar, a Russian football club, see FK Krasnodar
