= Mbara language =

Mbara may refer to:

- Mbara language (Chad), a Chadic language
- Mbara language (Australia), an extinct Pama–Nyungan language

== See also ==
- Mbabaram language, a language of Australia
- Bambara language, a language of Mali
