= Matal language =

Chadic language spoken in Cameroon

Matal
- Muktele
- Native to: Cameroon
- Region: Far North Province
- Native speakers: (18,000 cited 1982)
- Language family: Afro-Asiatic: Chadic; Biu–Mandara; Wandala–Mafa; Mafa (A.5); Matal

Language codes
- ISO 639-3: mfh
- Glottolog: mata1306

Matal, also known as Muktele and Balda, is an Afro-Asiatic language spoken in northern Cameroon.

The Matal inhabit the western edge of the Mandara Mountains, from the Parékwa massif southwards to the Méri. They also live the neighboring plain of Mayo-Ranéo (Baldama and Zouelva cantons in Mora arrondissement, Mayo-Sava department, Far North Region). They number 18,000 people.
