= Mser language =

Afro-Asiatic language of Cameroon and Chad

Msər
- Kuseri
- Native to: Cameroon, Chad
- Region: Far North Province, Cameroon; west Chad
- Native speakers: 500 in Cameroon (2004)
- Language family: Afro-Asiatic: Chadic; Biu–Mandara; Kotoko (B.1); South; Msər

Language codes
- ISO 639-3: kqx
- Glottolog: mser1242
- ELP: Mser

Mser (Msər), or Kousseri (Kuseri), is a moribund Afro-Asiatic language spoken in northern Cameroon and southwestern Chad. Dialects are Gawi, Houlouf, Kabe, Kalo, Mser (Kuseri).

In Cameroon, Mser is spoken in Kousseri (Kousséri and Logone-Birni communes, Chari Department, Far North Region). It is also spoken in Chad. There is a total of 2,100 speakers (in both Cameroon and Chad).
