= MBAR =

MBAR, Mbar or mbar may refer to:

== Arts and entertainment ==
- Mbar Ndiaye (born 1983), French taekwondo athlete
- Musée des Beaux-Arts de Rennes

== STEM and medicine ==
- Millibar (mbar), a unit of pressure
- Megabar (Mbar), a unit of pressure
- Multistate Bennett acceptance ratio

== Other uses ==
- Mbar (rural district), a rural district in the Gossas Department, Senegal
- mbar1260, Glottolog code of the Mbara language (Chad)
- mbar1261, Glottolog code of the Mbara language (Australia)
