= Afade language =

Afro-Asiatic language spoken in eastern Nigeria and northwestern Cameroon

Afade
- Afaɗə
- Native to: Cameroon, Nigeria
- Region: Far North Province, Cameroon; Borno State, Nigeria
- Native speakers: 5,000 in Cameroon (2004) unknown number in Nigeria
- Language family: Afro-Asiatic: Chadic; Biu–Mandara; Kotoko (B.1); North; Afade

Language codes
- ISO 639-3: aal
- Glottolog: afad1236

Afade (Afaɗə) is an Afro-Asiatic language spoken in eastern Nigeria and northwestern Cameroon.

== Classification ==
Afade is a member of the Biu-Mandara group of the Afro-Asiatic family of languages. It is related to the Cameroonian languages Mpade, Maslam, Malgbe, Mser, and Lagwan.

== Geographic distribution ==
=== Ethnologue ===
The speakers of Afade are the indigenous Kotoko people of Cameroon and Nigeria. According to Ethnologue, in Cameroon, it is spoken in the far North region: Logone-and-Chari division, south Makari subdivision, Afade area. The language is spoken by 6,700 Cameroon speakers. In Nigeria, Afade is spoken by 40,000 speakers in Borno State, Ngala LGA, 12 villages. There are no known dialects.

=== ALCAM (2012) ===
In Cameroon, Afade is spoken in the southern part of Makari commune, centered on the town of Afade and extending into Logone-Birni (Logone-et-Chari department, Far North region). It is spoken mainly in Nigeria.

== Phonology ==
Consonants
	Labial	Dental	Alveolar	Postalveolar	Palatal	Velar	Labial-velar	Glottal
Nasal	m		n					
Tenuis plosive	p		t			k	kp	ʔ
Voiced plosive	b		d		ɟ	ɡ	ɡb	
Ejective	pfʼ	t̪θʼ			cʼ	kʼ		
Implosive	ɓ		ɗ					
Fricative	f		s ɬ	ʃ				h
Resonant			l r		j		w	

Afade has a large inventory of consonants, including ejectives, implosives, and labial-velar stops. The vowels of Afade are /i u e ɤ o ɛ ɔ a ɑ/. /a/ is front, rather than central.
