= Vemgo-Mabas language =

Afro-Asiatic language of Cameroon and Nigeria

Vemgo-Mabas
- Native to: Nigeria, Cameroon
- Native speakers: (11,000 cited 1993–2004)
- Language family: Afro-Asiatic: Chadic; Biu–Mandara; Wandala–Mafa; Wandala (A.4); West; Vemgo-Mabas
- Dialects: Vemgo; Mabas

Language codes
- ISO 639-3: vem
- Glottolog: vemg1240

Vemgo-Mabas is an Afro-Asiatic language of Cameroon and Nigeria. Dialects are Vemgo, Mabas. Blench (2006) considers these to be separate languages. Ethnologue lists a third dialect, Visik in Nigeria, which is not well attested; Blench suspects it may be a dialect of Lamang instead.

In Cameroon, Mabas is spoken only in one village on the Nigerian border, namely Mabas village (Mokolo arrondissement, Mayo-Tsanaga department, Far North Region) by about 5,000 speakers (ALCAM 1984). Although closely related, Mabas is distinct from Hdi (78% lexical similarity, 36% mutual intelligibility).
