= MDCA =

MDCA may refer to:

- Acetyl-S-ACP:malonate ACP transferase, an enzyme
- Manchester and District Cricket Association
