= GDU =

GDU may refer to:

- Ganja State University, in Azerbaijan
- Garbage disposal unit
- Gelatin digesting unit
- Growing degree unit
- Gudu language
