= Putai language =

Afro-Asiatic language of Nigeria

Putai
- Marghi West
- Native to: Nigeria
- Region: Borno State
- Native speakers: (undated figure of 50)
- Language family: Afro-Asiatic: Chadic; Biu–Mandara; Bura–Higi; Bura (A.2); Putai

Language codes
- ISO 639-3: mfl
- Glottolog: puta1243
- ELP: Putai
- Linguasphere: 18-GBB-c

Putai also known as Marghi West is a nearly extinct Afro-Asiatic language spoken by the Margi Putai people in northeastern Nigeria. The language is dying out and being replaced by Kanuri.

== See also ==
- Marghi Central
- Marghi South
