= Sukur language =

Biu–Mandara language of Nigeria

Sukur
- Sakwun
- Native to: Nigeria
- Region: Adamawa State
- Native speakers: (15,000 cited 1992)
- Language family: Afro-Asiatic: Chadic; Biu–Mandara; Wandala–Mafa; Wandala; (A.6); Sukur

Language codes
- ISO 639-3: syk
- Glottolog: suku1272
- ELP: Sukur

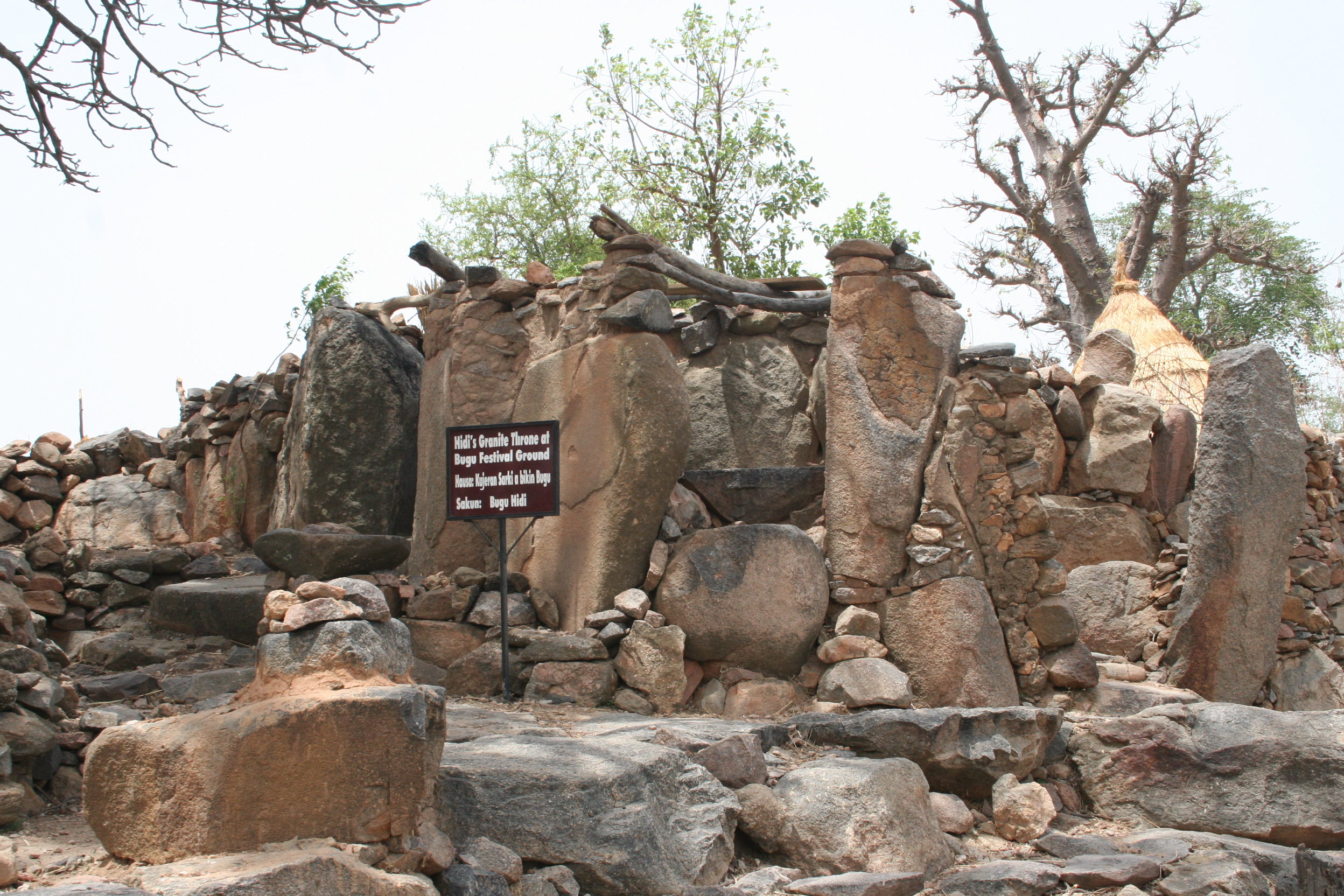
Sukur Adamawa Nigeria

Sukur (Adikimmu Sukur, Gemasakun, Sakul, Sugur, Sakun) is a Biu–Mandara language of Madagali LGA, Adamawa State, Nigeria.

== Phonology ==
Consonants
	Labial	Alveolar		Palatal	Velar	Glottal
	Labial	plain	lateral	Palatal	Velar	Glottal
Plosive	p b	t d			k g, kʷ	ʔ
Affricate		ts dz		tʃ dʒ		
Prenasalized	ᵐb	ⁿd, ⁿz		ⁿdʒ	ᵑg	
Implosive	ɓ	ɗ				
Fricative	f v	s z	ɬ ɮ	ʃ ʒ	x ɣ	
Nasal	m	n			ŋ	
Approximant	(ⱱ)	r	l	j	w	

- /ⱱ/ is only found intervocalically in ideophones.
- /ɬ/ is often pronounced [x] word-initially.
- /tʃ dʒ/ are often lenited to [ʃ ʒ] in fast speech.
- /k/ can vary to [x~kʷ~w~g].

Vowels
	Front	Central	Back
High	i		u
Mid		(ə)	
Low		a	

- /a/ can be raised to either [e] or [o].
- /ə/ is epenthetic. It is heard as [ə̥] if following an unvoiced consonant and if it does not bear any tone, and can also unpredictably be realized as [u̥] in fast speech.

Sukur also has two tones; high and low.
