= Dghwede language =

Chadic language of Nigeria

Dghweɗe
- Native to: Nigeria
- Region: Borno State
- Native speakers: (30,000 cited 1980)
- Language family: Afro-Asiatic: Chadic; Biu–Mandara; Wandala–Mafa; Wandala (A.4); West; Dghweɗe

Language codes
- ISO 639-3: dgh
- Glottolog: dghw1239

Dghweɗe (also known as Hude, Johode, Traude, Dehoxde, Tghuade, Toghwede, Wa'a, Azaghvana, Zaghvana) is a Chadic language spoken in Borno State, Nigeria in the Gwoza LGA.
