= Majera language =

Chadic language spoken in Chad and Cameroon

Majera
- Native to: Chad, Cameroon
- Native speakers: 500 (2004)
- Language family: Afro-Asiatic: Chadic; Biu–Mandara; East–Central; Mida'a; Majera

Language codes
- ISO 639-3: xmj
- Glottolog: maje1243
- ELP: Midah

Majera (Maz^{e}ra) is a minor Afro-Asiatic language of Chad and Cameroon.

In Cameroon, Majera is spoken in and around Majéra in the arrondissement of Zina, Logone-et-Chari Department, Far North Region. In the 1980s, there were 5,000 speakers or slightly less in Cameroon (ALCAM 1984). It is also spoken in Chad.
