= Ɗugwor language =

Chadic language of northern Cameroon

Ɗugwor
- Native to: Cameroon
- Region: Far North Province
- Native speakers: 5,000 (2001)
- Language family: Afro-Asiatic: Chadic; Biu–Mandara; Wandala–Mafa; Mafa (A.5); South (b); Ɗugwor
- Dialects: Mikere

Language codes
- ISO 639-3: dme
- Glottolog: dugw1239

Ɗugwor is a Chadic language spoken in northern Cameroon. Blench (2006) considers Mikere dialect to be a separate language.

The Dugwor have historically lived in two small massifs known as Dugwor and Mékéri, located in the south of Mayo-Ranéo. They now inhabit the neighboring plain of Tchakidjeke (west of Tchéré canton, Méri commune, Diamaré department, Far North region). They are part of the Mofu ethnic group; their neighbors call them Mofu-Dugwor.
