= Hya language =

Afro-Asiatic language spoken in Cameroon

Hya
- Native to: Cameroon, Nigeria
- Region: Far North Province and neighboring Nigeria
- Native speakers: 3,000 (2002–2008)
- Language family: Afro-Asiatic: Chadic; Biu–Mandara; Bura–Higi; Higi (A.3); Hya

Language codes
- ISO 639-3: hya
- Glottolog: hyaa1239

Hya is an Afro-Asiatic language spoken in northern Cameroon and neighboring regions of Nigeria.

== Distribution ==
The Hya language is spoken only in Amsa, a locality situated about 10 km south of Rumsiki where Psikya is spoken, on the border with Nigeria (Mogodé commune, Mayo-Tsanaga department, Far North Region). It may be the same as the "Higi" dialect Ghyá as listed by R. Mohrlang.

== Classification ==
Higi (spoken in Nigeria), Psikya, and Hya are three distinct but close languages belonging to the Margi group of languages.
