= Maslam language =

Afro-Asiatic language spoken in Chad and Cameroon

Maslam
- Maltam
- Native to: Cameroon, Chad
- Region: Far North Province, Cameroon; west Chad
- Native speakers: 250 (2004)
- Language family: Afro-Asiatic: Chadic; Biu–Mandara; Kotoko (B.1); North; Maslam

Language codes
- ISO 639-3: msv
- Glottolog: masl1241
- ELP: Maslam

Maslam is an Afro-Asiatic language spoken in northern Cameroon, with a few in southwestern Chad. Dialects are Maslam and Sao. Maslam is in rapid decline.

== Distribution ==
Maslam is spoken in Maltam. Sahu (Sao), a closely related variety, is spoken in Saho, a few kilometers to the north in southern Makari commune, and also in Goulfey and Kousseri communes in the department of Logone-et-Chari. It is also spoken in Chad. In the 1980s, there were 5,000 speakers or slightly fewer in Cameroon (ALCAM 1984).
