= Ngwaba language =

Afro-Asiatic language

Ngwaba
- Native to: Nigeria
- Region: Adamawa State
- Native speakers: (10,000 cited 1993)
- Language family: Afro-Asiatic: Chadic; Biu–Mandara; Tera (A.1); Ngwaba

Language codes
- ISO 639-3: ngw
- Glottolog: ngwa1251
- ELP: Ngwaba

Ngwaba (also known as Gombi, Goba) is an Afro-Asiatic language spoken in Nigeria in Adamawa State in the Gombi and Hong LGAs.
