= Holma language =

Extinct Afro-Asiatic language of Nigeria

Holma
- Native to: Nigeria
- Region: Adamawa State
- Extinct: Early 1990s
- Language family: Afro-Asiatic: Chadic; Biu–Mandara; Bata (A.8); Holma

Language codes
- ISO 639-3: hod
- Glottolog: holm1250

Holma (also known as Da Holmaci, Bali Holma) is an extinct Afro-Asiatic language formerly spoken in Nigeria in Adamawa State, near the Cameroon border. Speakers switched to Nigerian Fulfulde.

Holma people were believed to be of Yemenite origin. Their forefathers were said to have migrated from Yemen around 110 of Hijrah, corresponding to 728 Gregorian. The Yemenites, in pursuit of spreading Islam, after having been highly attended to by the prophet of Islam, sending his companions to teach them even without him stepping foot in the land, felt the urge to expand their knowledge and faith to other lands, especially in Africa. These Yemenis, some of whom have intermarried with some of those companions of the prophet, moving from one region to another, reached northern Nigeria on Islamic evangelism, reaching a region that is now called Adamawa and settling in its provinces.

Later, after the demise of the evangelical forefathers of Holma, generations returned to non-Islamic practices of idolatry and other atrocities until the emergence of Usman Dan Fodio and his Jihad (strive). Around 1754-1817, the founder of the Sokoto caliphate Usman Dan Fodio launched his Jihad (strive) to establish Islamic empire through preaching and fighting wars. At the realisation of that move, leaders of the Holma people made a consensus to reclaim their lost Faith from the Islamic evangelist Dan Fodio, without fighting wars. Holma leaders sent to Dan Fodio announcing their allegiance and support. At that, Dan Fodio commented, "Holma én hòlabe" noting that (Holmans are worth trust). With that, Holma people were not fought, and none was enslaved.

After some time, the Holma leaders sensed that some members kept to the pagan traditions associated with the Holma language and the worship of idols. As a remedy, the leaders threatened that "anyone who keeps a pagan tradition and the language of the idols, after accepting Islam, will die because the gods are angry". For that reason, Holma people sacrificed both the language and the traditions of the idols in order to keep their Islamic faith and their allegiance with Usman Dan Fodio.
