= Lagwan language =

Chadic language spoken in Central Africa

Lagwan
- Logone
- Native to: Cameroon, Chad
- Region: Far North Province, Cameroon; west Chad
- Ethnicity: Kotoko
- Native speakers: 10,000 in Cameroon (2004)
- Language family: Afro-Asiatic: Chadic; Biu–Mandara; Kotoko (B.1); South; Lagwan

Language codes
- ISO 639-3: kot
- Glottolog: lagw1237
- ELP: Lagwan

Lagwan (Logone) is a Chadic language spoken in northern Cameroon and southwestern Chad. Dialects include Logone-Birni and Logone-Gana.

Lagwan is spoken in the northern part of Logone-Birni, from the banks of the Logone River to the Nigerian border (Logone-et-Chari Department, Far North Region). It is also spoken in Chad and Nigeria. It has 38,500 speakers in Cameroon.

== Phonology ==
Consonants
		Labial	Alveolar	Lateral alveolar	Dorsal	Labialized dorsal
plosive	Voiceless	p	t		k	kʷ
plosive	Voiced	b	d		g	gʷ
plosive	Glottalic	ɓ	ɗ		kʼ	kʷʼ
fricative	Voiceless	f	s	ɬ	χ	χʷ
fricative	Voiced	v	z	ɮ	ʁ	ʁʷ
fricative	Glottalic		sʼ	ɬʼ		
sonorant	Nasal	m	n			
sonorant	Tap		ɾ			
sonorant	Approximant			l	j	w

As is common in Chadic languages, the principal vowel is the low central vowel /a/; where there is no underlying V-slot, an epenthetic ‘zero vowel’ is inserted. Despite the limited distribution of the other vowels, /i, u, e, o/ have emerging phonological status. However, as has been observed in other Chadic languages, certain contrasts are productive only word-finally, excluding the sub-lexicon of loan words.

Lagwan has two contrastive tones, low and high. Mid tone is also found on a few nouns loaned from Classical Arabic. On intensifiers the phonological high tone has an extra-high realisation.
