= Gvoko language =

Chadic language spoken in Nigeria and Cameroon

Gvoko
- Native to: Nigeria, Cameroon
- Region: Borno State; Far North Province
- Native speakers: (21,000 cited 1990)
- Language family: Afro-Asiatic: Chadic; Biu–Mandara; Wandala–Mafa; Wandala (A.4); West; Gvoko

Language codes
- ISO 639-3: ngs
- Glottolog: gvok1239

Gvoko (also known as Gevoko, Ghboko, Gavoko, Kuvoko, Ngossi, Ngoshi, Ngoshe-Ndhang, Ngweshe-Ndaghan, Ngoshe Sama, Nggweshe) is an Afro-Asiatic language spoken in Borno State, Nigeria and Far North Province, Cameroon.

In Cameroon, Gevoko is spoken in the village of Ngossi, on the border with Nigeria, north of Tourou (Mokolo arrondissement, Mayo-Tsanaga department). It is mainly spoken in Nigeria.
