= Wuzlam language =

Afro-Asiatic language of northern Cameroon

Wuzlam
- Native to: Cameroon
- Region: Far North Province
- Native speakers: (10,500 cited 1982)
- Language family: Afro-Asiatic: Chadic; Biu–Mandara; Wandala–Mafa; Mafa (A.5); South (a); Wuzlam

Language codes
- ISO 639-3: udl
- Glottolog: wuzl1236

Wuzlam, also called Uldeme (Ouldémé), Udlam, Ouzlam, Uzam, Uzlam, and Mizlime, is an Afro-Asiatic language of the Chadic branch. It is spoken in northern Cameroon.

The Wuzlam (10,500 speakers) originally lived in the Wuzlam massif, in the canton of Mayo-Ouldémé (arrondissement of Tokombéré, department of Maya-Sava, Far North Region). The northeastern edge of this massif is inhabited by speakers of Pelasla or Gwendelé, culturally assimilated to the Wuzlam, or "Ouldémé".

== Phonology ==
=== Consonants ===
Wuzlam consonants
		Labial	Dental	Palatal	Velar	Labiovelar
Implosive		ɓ	ɗ			
Plosive	Voiceless	p	t	tʃ	k	kʷ
Plosive	Voiced	b	d	dʒ	g	gʷ
Plosive	Prenasalized	ᵐb	ⁿd	ⁿʒ	ᵑg	ᵑgʷ
Nasal		m	n		ŋ	ŋʷ
Fricative	Voiceless	f	ɬ	s	x	xʷ
Fricative	Voiced	v	ɮ	z	ɣ	ɣʷ
Sonorant	Approximant		l	j		w
Sonorant	Vibrant		r			

- The palatal series of consonants are apico-alveolar [t͡s, d͡z, ⁿz, s, z] before /a, ə/ and dorso-palatal [t͡ʃ, d͡ʒ, ⁿʒ, ʃ, ʒ] before /e, i/.

=== Vowels ===
Wuzlam vowels
	Front	Non-front
Tense	e	a
Lax	i	ə

Colombel states that the four vowels are distinguished by palatalization and tension.

== Works cited ==
- Colombel, Veronique de (2005a). La langue ouldeme nord-Cameroun: grammaire, texte, lexique. Peeters. ISBN 90-429-1448-3.
