= Tera language =

Chadic dialect cluster of northeastern Nigeria

Tera
- Nyimalti
- Region: Nigeria
- Native speakers: (101,000 cited 2000)
- Language family: Afro-Asiatic: Chadic; Biu–Mandara; Tera languages (A.1); Tera
- Dialects: Pidlimdi (Kurba, Hinna and Deba)

Language codes
- ISO 639-3: ttr
- Glottolog: tera1251

Tera is a Chadic dialect cluster spoken in northeastern Nigeria in the north and eastern parts of Gombe State and Borno State. Blench (2006) believes Pidlimdi (Hinna) dialect is a separate language.

== Varieties ==
Blench lists these language varieties as part of the Tera language cluster.

- Nyimatli
- Pidlimdi
- Bura Kokura

== Phonology ==
Consonants
		Labial			Alveolar				Post-al. /Palatal		Velar				Glottal
		plain		palatal.	median		lateral		Post-al. /Palatal		plain		labial.		Glottal
Nasal			m	mʲ		n				ɲ		ŋ			
Stop^{1}	plain	p	b		t^{2}	d^{2}			tʃ^{2}	dʒ^{2}	k	ɡ	kʷ	ɡʷ	
Stop^{1}	prenasal.		ᵐb			ⁿd				ᶮdʒ		ᵑɡ		ᵑɡʷ	
Stop^{1}	implosive		ɓ	ɓʲ		ɗ						ɠ			
Fricative		f	v	vʲ	s	z	ɬ	ɮ	ʃ	ʒ	x	ɣ	xʷ	ɣʷ	h^{3}
Approximant	plain							l		j				w	
Approximant	glottal.									jˀ^{4}					
Trill						r									

^1 Voiceless plosives are lightly aspirated but unreleased before another consonant.
^2 /t/ and /d/ formally had /tʃ/ and /dʒ/ respectively as allophones but the two pairs have split; however, the alveolar plosives never precede front vowels and the postalveolar affricates rarely precede anything but front vowels.
^3 /h/ is a relatively new phoneme, appearing in loanwords from English and Hausa.
^4 /jˀ/ derives from a /ɗʲ/ that has lost its alveolar contact while retaining the palatal and glottal action.

Monophthongs of Tera, from Tench (2007:230)

Diphthongs of Tera, from Tench (2007:231)

Vowels
	Front	Central	Back
Close	i iː	ɨ	u uː
Mid	e eː		o oː
Open		a aː	

- The mid vowels /e, eː, o, oː/ are true-mid [e̞, e̞ː, o̞, o̞ː].
- The open vowels /a, aː/ are central [ä, äː].
- /ɨ/ in closed syllables is [ɨ̞]

Vowel length contrasts are neutralized in monosyllabic words with no coda consonants.

All vowels but /a/ and /aː/ are more open in closed syllables such as in [ɮɛp] ('to plait') and [xʊ́r] ('to cook soup'). /a/ and /aː/ tend to be fronted to [æ, æː] when following palatalized consonants.

Diphthongs, which have the same length as long vowels, consist of a non-high vowel and a high vowel:

Diphthong	Example	Orthography	Gloss
/eu/	/ɓeu/	ɓeu	'sour'
/oi/	/woi/	woi	'child'
/ai/	/ɣài/	ghai	'town'
/au/	/ɮàu/	dlau	'sickle'

- Phonetically, these diphthongs are [e̞ʊ, o̞ɪ, ɐɪ, ɐʊ].

=== Tone ===
Tera is a tonal language, distinguishing high, mid and low tone. Tone is not indicated orthographically since no minimal trios exist; minimal pairs can be distinguished by context.

== Orthography ==
The first publication in Tera was Labar Mbarkandu nu Yohanna Bula Ki, a translation of the Gospel of John, which established an orthographic system. In 2004, this orthographic system was revised.

== Bibliography ==
- Tench, Paul (2007), "Tera", Journal of the International Phonetic Association, 37 (1): 228–234, doi:10.1017/s0025100307002952
