= Hina language =

Afro-Asiatic language of Cameroon

Mina
- Hina
- Besleri
- Native to: Cameroon
- Region: Far North Region
- Native speakers: (11,000 cited 2000)
- Language family: Afro-Asiatic: Chadic; Biu–Mandara; Daba (A.7); South; Mina
- Dialects: Besleri; Jɨŋjɨŋ; Gamdugun

Language codes
- ISO 639-3: hna
- Glottolog: mina1276

The Mina language, also known by the names Hina and Besleri, is a Chadic language spoken in Northern Cameroon by around 11,000 people. Speakers of Mina are generally bilingual, with Fulfulde (Fula) being the second language. Fulfulde is often joined by French as a third language in educated speakers.

Besleri is spoken in most of Hina commune (Mayo-Tsanaga Department, Far North Region), with Gamdugun and Jinjin in the southwest and southeast of the area, respectively.

== Dialects ==
Frajzyngier & Johnston (2005) list three Mina dialects: Marbak, Kefedjevreng and Dzundzun. Ethnologue also lists three: Besleri, Jingjing (Dzumdzum), Gamdugun. While the correspondence of "Jingjing" and "Dzundzun" is clear, the identity of the others is not. Mutual intelligibility between dialects is difficult to ascertain, but Frajzyngier & Johnston (2005:3) demonstrate one-way intelligibility between Dzundzun and Mina (presumably meaning the Marbak dialect).
