= Jilbe language =

Afro-Asiatic language of Nigeria

Jilbe
- Native to: Nigeria
- Region: Borno State
- Native speakers: Last spoken by an elder man in 2006 (to a undated number of fewer than 20) (2008)
- Language family: Afro-Asiatic: Chadic; Biu–Mandara; Kotoko (B.1); (?); Jilbe

Language codes
- ISO 639-3: jie
- Glottolog: jilb1238
- ELP: Jilbe

Jilbe (also known as Zoulbou) is a critically endangered, probably extinct Afro-Asiatic language spoken in a single village in Borno State, Nigeria. It is also called Zoulbou.

It is spoken in Jilbe town, across the Cameroon border from Dabanga town.
