= Bana language =

Language spoken in Cameroon

Bana
- Native to: Cameroon
- Region: Far North Region, Cameroon
- Native speakers: 23,000 (2007)
- Language family: Afro-Asiatic: Chadic; Biu–Mandara; Bura–Higi; Higi (A.3); Bana

Language codes
- ISO 639-3: bcw
- Glottolog: bana1305
- ELP: Bana

Bana
- Language: koma kabana

Bana is an Afro-Asiatic language spoken in northern Cameroon. Dialects include Gamboura and Gili.

Bana is spoken in the canton of Guili, in the northern part of the commune of Bourrha (department of Mayo-Tsanaga, Far North Region). The speakers call their language koma kabana 'the language of the Bana'.

== Phonology ==
Consonants
		Labial	Alveolar	Palatal	Velar		Uvular		Glottal	
		Labial	Alveolar	Palatal	Plain	Labialized	Plain	Labialized	Plain	Labialized
Nasal		m	n		ŋ	ŋʷ				
Plosive	Voiceless	p	t		k	kʷ			ʔ	ʔʷ
Plosive	Voiced	b	d		ɡ	ɡʷ				
Plosive	Prenasalized	ᵐb	ⁿd		ᵑɡ	ᵑɡʷ				
Implosive		ɓ	ɗ							
Affricate	Voiceless		ts							
Affricate	Voiced		dz							
Affricate	Prenasalized		ⁿdz							
Fricative	Voiceless	f	s				χ	χʷ		
Fricative	Voiced	v	z				ʁ	ʁʷ		
Flap		ⱱ	ɾ							
Approximant				j		w				

The vowels of Bana are /ɨ ə ɛ/, which can occur with high, falling, low, or rising tone.
