= Buwal language =

Afro-Asiatic language spoken in Cameroon

Buwal
- Gadala
- Native to: Cameroon
- Region: Far North Province
- Native speakers: 10,000 (2004)
- Language family: Afro-Asiatic: Chadic; Biu–Mandara; Daba (A.7); North; Buwal

Language codes
- ISO 639-3: bhs
- Glottolog: buwa1243

Buwal, also known as Ma Buwal, Bual, or Gadala, is an Afro-Asiatic language spoken in Cameroon in Far North Province in and around Gadala.

== Phonology ==
Consonants
| | Labial | Alveolar | Lateral alveolar | Palatal | Velar | Labialized velar | Labial-velar |
|---|---|---|---|---|---|---|---|
| Nasal | m | n | | | ŋ | ŋʷ | ŋm |
| Voiceless plosive | p | t | | | k | kʷ | kp |
| Voiced plosive | b | d | | | ɡ | ɡʷ | ɡb |
| Prenasalized plosive | ᵐb | ⁿd | | | ᵑɡ | ᵑɡʷ | ᵑᵐɡb |
| Implosive | ɓ | ɗ | | | | | |
| Voiceless affricate | | ts | | | | | |
| Voiced affricate | | dz | | | | | |
| Prenasalized affricate | | ⁿdz | | | | | |
| Voiceless fricative | f | s | ɬ | | x | xʷ | |
| Voiced fricative | v | z | ɮ | | ɣ | ɣʷ | |
| Flap | ⱱ | ɾ | | | | | |
| Approximant | | | l | j | | w | |

The labiodental flap /ⱱ/ is marginal, only occurring in two native Buwal words. The labial-velar plosives are also marginal; in particular, /kp/ only occurs in one word, the ideophone kpaŋ.

Buwal has the vowels /ə a/, which can occur in high, middle, or low tone. Each vowel has a variety of phonetic realizations. /ə/ can occur as [i u ɪ ʏ ʊ], and /a/ can occur as [e o ɛ œ ɐ ɔ]. The schwa can be analyzed as a solely epenthetic vowel. These vowels occur as rounded allophones when adjacent to a labialized consonant, and as front vowels when the word is palatalized.

Palatalization in Buwal occurs across an entire word, and also affects the affricate consonants /ts dz ⁿdz/, which surface as [tʃ dʒ ⁿdʒ] in a palatalized word. As a result, all of the vowels within a single word are either front or back, producing vowel harmony. An example of this contrast is between [mɐ̄ⁿdʊ́wɐ́n] 'rat' (underlyingly /māⁿdwán/), which is non-palatalized, and [mɛ̀vɛ̄ɗvɛ̄ɗɛ̄ŋ] (underlyingly /màvāɗvāɗāŋ/) 'turtle', which is palatalized. This process does not affect loanwords, e.g. [nɛ̀bɐ̄m] 'oil' (from Fulfulde nebbam) or [lɛ̀kʷól] 'school' (from French l'école). Some loanwords have been modified to accommodate Buwal phonology, e.g. [sɐ́j] 'tea', from Fulfulde sha'i.
