= Fali people =

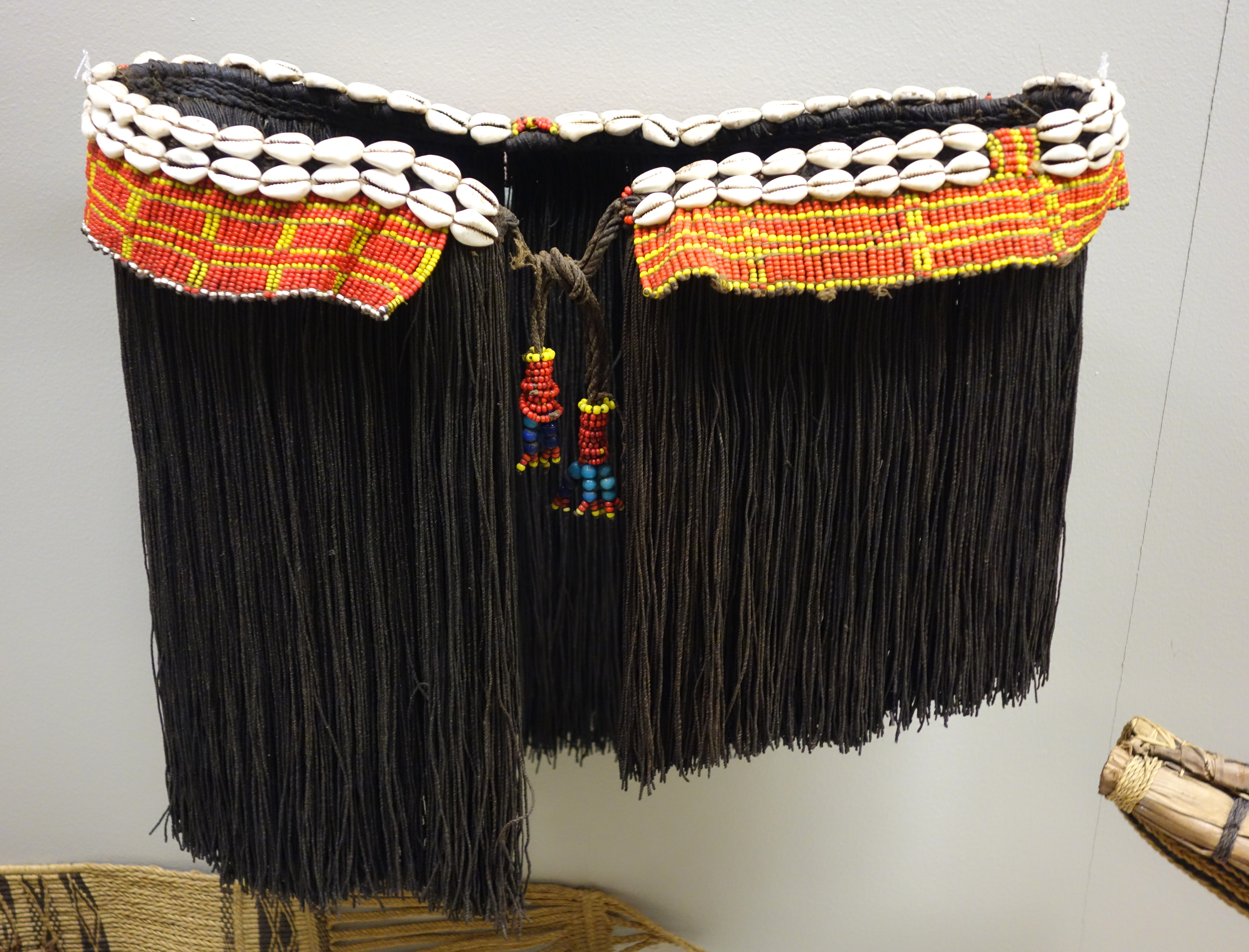
Fali belt (inv. EO.1973.18.2), Royal Museum for Central Africa.

The Fali people (called the Bana in Nigeria) are any of several small ethnic groups of Africa. The Fali are concentrated in mountainous areas of northern Cameroon, but some also live in northeastern Nigeria. The Fali are composed of four major groups, each corresponding to a geographic region: The Bossoum Fali, the Kangou Fali, the Peske–Bori Fali, and the Tingelin Fali. The Fali in Cameroon have been described as being centered on Garoua as well as the rocky plateaus and peaks of the Adamawa mountains in the country's north. The Fali are sometimes referred to as the Kirdi, meaning "pagan," a term given by the neighboring Muslim Fulani; after they fought against the jihadists and rejected Islam. Today the Fali in Mubi North Adamawa state are predominantly Christians.

== Origins ==
The term Fali is from a Fula word meaning "perched," a reference to how Fali compounds appear on the sides of mountains. The Fali in Nigeria primarily live in the Mubi District, Mubi Division of the former Gongola State.

The Fali people trace their ancestry to the Ngomma, who founded the ancient capital of Timpil. Other accounts trace the Fali's origins to the Sao civilization on Lake Chad, which flourished from the tenth to the 16th centuries.

== Culture ==
The Fali speak various languages that are somehow related. The differences between these dialects can be observed at the level of vocabulary, grammar, pronunciation and semantics.

The Fali primarily engage in farming and hunting. Major crops include millet, chickpeas, peanuts (groundnuts), squash, tobacco, okra, and cotton. The Fali are exogamous, patrilineal, and hierarchical, with society being made up of clans with distinct territories and chiefs, and tracing their origin to a common ancestor. They observe virilocal residence.

Cissus quadrangularis is significant to Fali in Cameroon, and the Fali are reported to wash their dead in a decoction of the plant. The Fali believe that the development of the plants is important to fertility; a C. quadrangularis is planted on proposed construction sites, and if the plant does not flourish, a new site is chosen.

== Religion ==
The original Fali religion is traditional African. It has been identified as monotheistic, involving belief in a creator god, Muttaf, and a mother goddess, Ona, the Earth. Followers of the Fali religion make prayers and offerings to ancestors to intercede with Faw on behalf of the living. The Fali "conceive of Muttaf not only as creator and organizer, but also as a just God who is undepictable by human intelligence." The religion also includes belief in supernatural beings, including genies, sacred crocodiles, and the black snake, the master of darkness.

By 2009, increasing numbers of Fali were Christians although many converts maintain syncretic beliefs. The total population of Fali is over 250,000 people, with 99 percent being Christians (in Nigeria) and the remainder being Muslims and traditional believers. The dominant churches in Fali Land are Catholic, Baptist and EYN with few Pentecostal churches coming up in recent days.
