= Gidar language =

Chadic language spoken in Cameroon and Chad

Gidar
- Kaɗa
- Native to: Cameroon, Chad
- Native speakers: (70,000 cited 1982–1993)
- Language family: Afro-Asiatic: Chadic; Biu–Mandara; East–Central; Gidar

Language codes
- ISO 639-3: gid
- Glottolog: gida1247

Gidar (Gidder), or Kaɗa, is a Biu–Mandara (Chadic) language of Cameroon and Chad.

Gedar is spoken from Guider to the Chadian border in the Far North Region of Cameroon, in Mayo-Kani Department (arrondissements of Kaélé and Moutourwa), and in the North Region, Mayo-Louti Department. Baynawa means "my friend" in the Gedar language, and this name is what some people use for the Gedar (ALCAM 1983).
