= Merey language =

Afro-Asiatic language of northern Cameroon

Merey
- Native to: Cameroon
- Region: Far North Province
- Native speakers: (10,000 cited 1982)
- Language family: Afro-Asiatic: Chadic; Biu–Mandara; Wandala–Mafa; Mafa (A.5); South (b); Merey

Language codes
- ISO 639-3: meq
- Glottolog: mere1246

Merey is an Afro-Asiatic language spoken in northern Cameroon. Dugur is a dialect.

The Merey [meri] (10,000 speakers) live in the Méri massif, located immediately west of the town of Méri (Méri canton, Méri commune, Diamaré department, Far North region).
