= North Giziga language =

Afro-Asiatic language spoken in Cameroon

North Giziga
- Native to: Cameroon
- Region: Far North Province
- Native speakers: (20,000 cited 1982)
- Language family: Afro-Asiatic: Chadic; Biu–Mandara; Wandala–Mafa; Mafa (A.5); South (c); North Giziga

Language codes
- ISO 639-3: gis
- Glottolog: nort3047

North Giziga is an Afro-Asiatic language spoken in northern Cameroon.

North Giziga (20,000 speakers) is spoken in the Tchéré and Mogazang massifs and the neighboring plains (Dogba) located north of Maroua (in Tchéré, Godola, and Mambang cantons, Meri commune, Diamaré department, Far North Region). The inhabitants of the Tchéré massif, sometimes called "Mofous de Tchéré", have adopted the Giziga language, although an ancient "Tchéré" language may have been spoken in the past.

The speakers of South Giziga call North Giziga "Giziga tókó-tókó", from tókó "is that not", which the South Giziga pronounce [takwa].
