= Hwana language =

Chadic language spoken in Nigeria

Hwana
- Native to: Nigeria
- Region: Adamawa State
- Native speakers: (32,000 cited 1992)
- Language family: Afro-Asiatic: Chadic; Biu–Mandara; Tera (A.1); Hwana

Language codes
- ISO 639-3: hwo
- Glottolog: hwan1240

Hwana (also known as Hwona, Hona, Tuftera, Fiterya) is an Afro-Asiatic language spoken in Adamawa State, Nigeria.
