= Mbudum language =

Afro-Asiatic language spoken in Cameroon

Mbudum
- Mbədam
- Native to: Cameroon
- Region: Far North Province
- Native speakers: 6,000 (2001)
- Language family: Afro-Asiatic: Chadic; Biu–Mandara; Daba (A.7); South; Mbudum

Language codes
- ISO 639-3: xmd
- Glottolog: mbed1242

Mbudum or Mbədam is an Afro-Asiatic language spoken in Cameroon in Far North Province.

== Distribution ==
Mbedam is spoken northeast of Hina in Mokolo arrondissement (Mayo-Tsanaga department, Far North Region). It has about 6,000 native speakers, which are decreasing.
