= Glavda language =

Chadic language spoken in Nigeria and Cameroon

Glavda
- Galvaxdaxa
- Native to: Nigeria, Cameroon
- Region: Borno State; Far North Province
- Native speakers: 29,000 (2024)
- Language family: Afro-Asiatic: Chadic; Biu–Mandara; Wandala–Mafa; Wandala (A.4); East; Glavda

Language codes
- ISO 639-3: glw
- Glottolog: glav1244

Glavda (also known as Galavda, Gelebda, Glanda, Guelebda, Galvaxdaxa) is an Afro-Asiatic language spoken in Borno State, Nigeria and in Far North Province, Cameroon.

The Gelvaxdaxa community is very small in Cameroon (about 2,800 speakers). The language, also called Guélebda, is spoken around the village of the same name, located on the border with Nigeria, south of the town of Ashigashia (arrondissement of Mayo-Moskota, department of Mayo-Tsanaga, Far North Region). It is more common in neighboring Nigerian markets, whereas in Cameroon, the Wandala language and Mafa language are preferred in the area.
