= Malgbe language =

Afro-Asiatic language spoken in Cameroon and Chad

Malgbe
- Gulfey
- Native to: Cameroon, Chad
- Region: Far North Province, Cameroon; west Chad
- Native speakers: 6,000 in Cameroon (2004)
- Language family: Afro-Asiatic: Chadic; Biu–Mandara; Kotoko (B.1); North; Malgbe

Language codes
- ISO 639-3: mxf
- Glottolog: malg1250

Malgbe is an Afro-Asiatic language spoken in northern Cameroon and southwestern Chad. Dialects are Douguia, Dro, Malgbe, Mara, and Walia.

Malgbe is spoken in Goulfey commune and also to the south in Chari (Logone-et-Chari department, Far North region). It is related to Afade, Mser, Lagwan, Maslam, and Mpade. Malgbe is also spoken in Chad. The total population is estimated at 36,000 speakers.
