= Hdi language =

Chadic language spoken in West Africa

Hdi
- Xədi
- Native to: Cameroon, Nigeria
- Native speakers: (29,000 cited 2001)
- Language family: Afro-Asiatic: Chadic; Biu–Mandara; A; Mandara–Lamang; Lamang; Hdi

Language codes
- ISO 639-3: xed
- Glottolog: hdii1240

Hdi (Hedi, Xədi, Tur) is an Afro-Asiatic language of Cameroon and Nigeria.

In Cameroon, Hdi is only spoken in one village on the Nigerian border, namely Tourou (arrondissement of Mokolo, department of Mayo-Tsanaga, Far North Region) by 1,000 speakers. It is mainly spoken in Nigeria. Hdi and Mabas are closely related but distinct languages.
