= Kotoko people =

Ethnic group in Cameroon, Chad and Nigeria

Kotoko
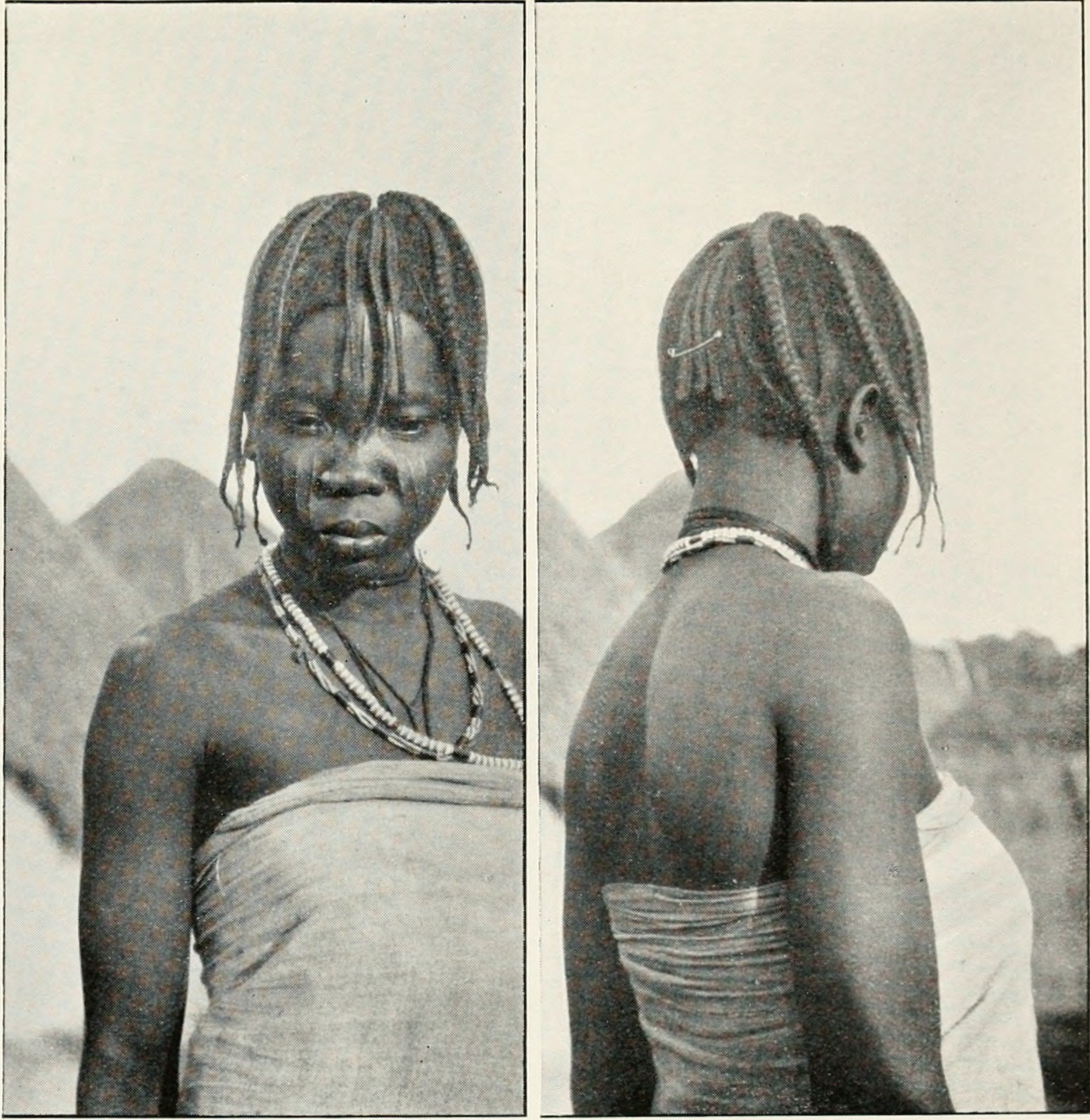
- Kotoko woman (1912)

Total population
- 90,000 people

Regions with significant populations
- northern Cameroon, Chad and Nigeria

Languages
- Lagwan and other Mandage languages

Religion
- Islam

The Kotoko people, also called Mser, Moria, Bara and Makari, are a Chadic ethnic group located in northern Cameroon, Chad and Nigeria. The Kotoko population is composed of approximately 90,000 people of which the majority live in Cameroon. The Kotoko form part of the Chadic people. Their mother tongue is Lagwan and other Mandage languages. Most of the Kotoko are Sunni Muslims.

== History ==
Kotoko brass donkey with rider

They founded the Kotoko kingdom in c. 1500 CE, and are considered to be descendants of the Sao civilization.

== Culture ==
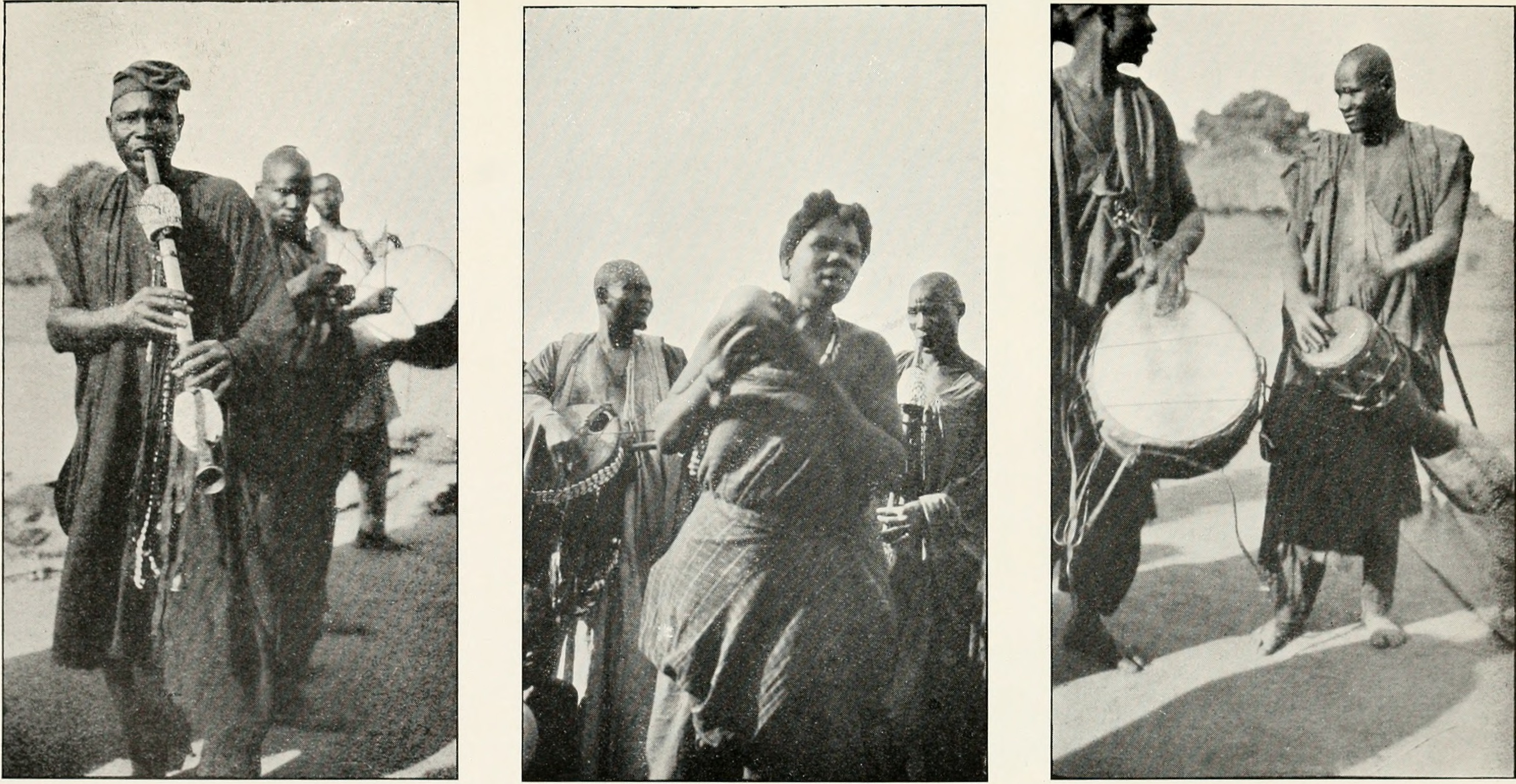
Kotoko musicians

The Kotoko engage in fishing (with the aid of their long canoes) and in agriculture. The fish they catch is subsequently smoked or dried then sold in local markets. Wealthier families also raise cattle.

Most Kotoko profess Islam and are Sunni Muslims. While the Kotoko began adopting the religion around the 16th century, other communities did not convert until the 18th century. The Kotoko converted to Islam due to the growing presence of Muslim merchants and clerics from the Bornu Empire. Many traditional beliefs and practices are incorporated into the Islamic practices of the Kotoko.
