= Muskum language =

Extinct Biu–Mandara language of Chad

Muskum
- Muzuk
- Native to: Chad
- Extinct: late 1970s
- Language family: Afro-Asiatic: Chadic; Biu–Mandara; East–Central; Munjuk (B.2); Muskum

Language codes
- ISO 639-3: mje
- Glottolog: musk1256

Muskum (Muzgum, Muzuk) is an extinct Chadic (Biu–Mandara) language of Chad. Speakers have shifted to Musgu [mug].
