= Boga language =

Chadic language spoken in Nigeria

Boga
- Native to: Nigeria
- Region: Adamawa State
- Native speakers: (10,000 cited 1990)
- Language family: Afro-Asiatic: Chadic; Biu–Mandara; Tera (A.1); Boga

Language codes
- ISO 639-3: bvw
- Glottolog: boga1251

Boga (also known as Boka) is an Afro-Asiatic language spoken in the Adamawa State of Nigeria.
