= Sharwa language =

Afro-Asiatic language of Cameroon

Sharwa
- Native to: Cameroon
- Region: Far North Province
- Native speakers: (5,100 cited 2000)
- Language family: Afro-Asiatic: Chadic; Biu–Mandara; Bata (A.8); Sharwa

Language codes
- ISO 639-3: swq
- Glottolog: shar1249

Sharwa (also known as Tchevi, Sherwin, Sarwaye) is an Afro-Asiatic language spoken in Cameroon in Far North Province. There are signs of language shift to Fulfulde.

Sharwa speakers (5,100) are also called Tchévi, which is their largest town, in the southern part of Bourrha commune (Mayo-Tsanaga district, Far North Region). Sharwa is also spoken in the Northern Region, in Mayo-Louti department (Mayo-Oulo commune). They are mostly assimilated with the Gude.
