= Logone-et-Chari =

- Department
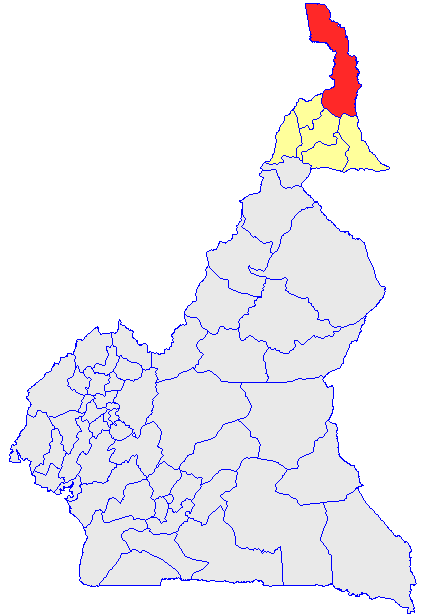
- Department location in Cameroon
- Country: Cameroon
- Province: Extreme-Nord Province
- Capital: Kousséri

Area
  - Total: 4,685 sq mi (12,133 km^{2})

Population (2005)
  - Total: 486,997
- Time zone: UTC+1 (WAT)

Logone-et-Chari is a department of Extreme-Nord Province in Cameroon. The department covers an area of 12,133 km^{2} and at the 2005 Census had a total population of 486,997. The capital of the department is at Kousséri. Most inhabitants of this department speak Chadian Arabic.

== Subdivisions ==
The department is divided administratively into 10 communes and in turn into villages.

=== Communes ===
- Blangoua
- Darak
- Fotokol
- Goulfey
- Hile-Alifa
- Kousséri
- Logone-Birni
- Makary
- Waza
- Zina

== Languages ==
Languages spoken include:

- Afade
- Chadian Arabic
- Jina
- Kuo
- Lagwan
- Majera
- Malgbe
- Maslam
- Masana
- Nzakambay
