= Biu–Mandara languages =

Languages of the Afro-Asiatic family

Biu–Mandara
- Central Chadic
- Geographic distribution: Nigeria, Chad, Cameroon
- Linguistic classification: Afro-Asiatic: Chadic; Biu–Mandara
- Proto-language: Proto-Central Chadic
- Subdivisions: South; Hurza; North

Language codes
- Glottolog: bium1280

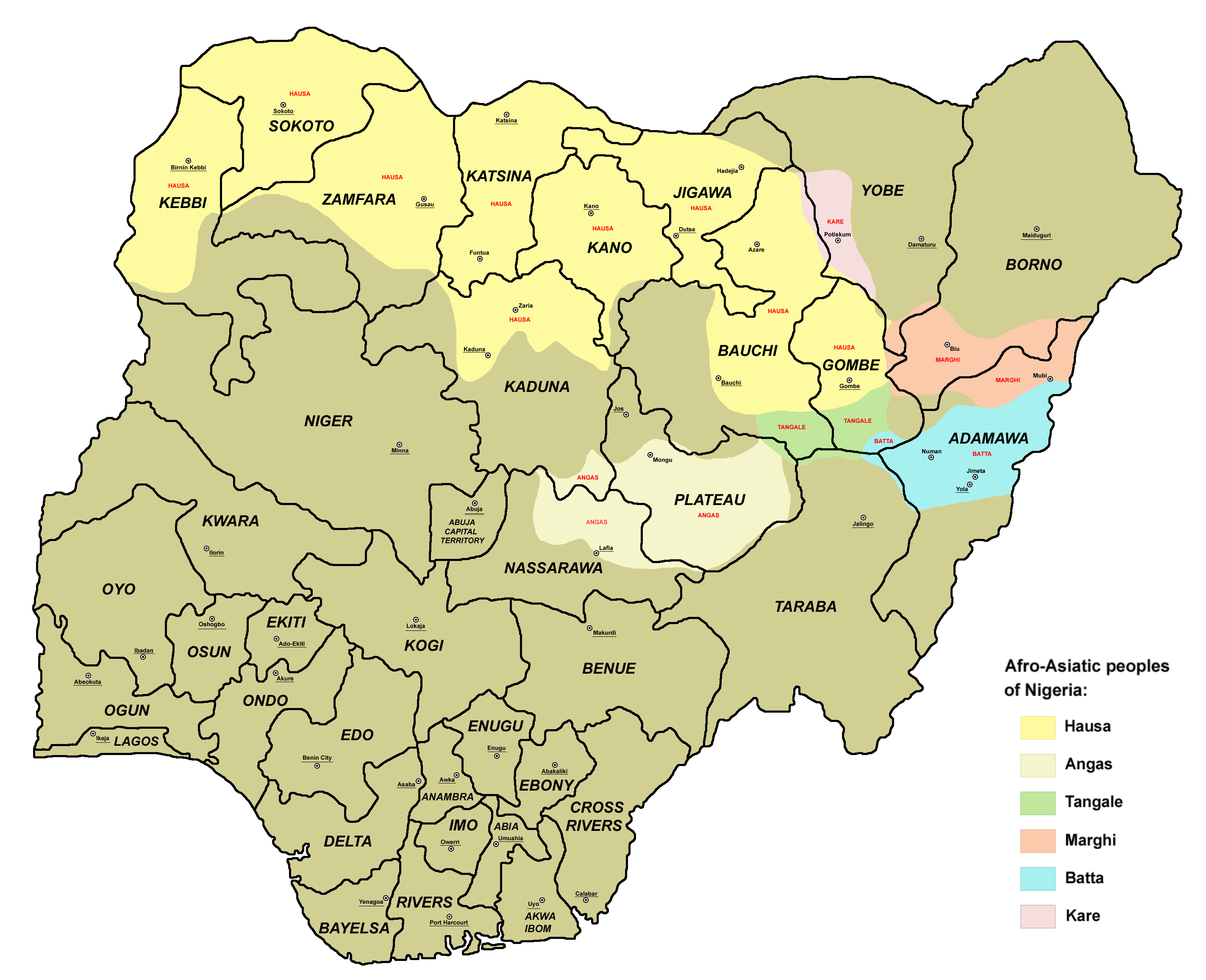
Main Chadic-speaking peoples in Nigeria.

The Biu–Mandara or Central Chadic languages of the Afro-Asiatic family are spoken in Nigeria, Chad and Cameroon.

A reconstruction of Proto-Central Chadic has been proposed by Gravina (2014).

== Languages ==
=== Gravina (2014) ===
Gravina (2014) classifies Central Chadic as follows, as part of a reconstruction of the proto-language. Letters and numbers in parentheses correspond to branches in previous classifications. The greatest changes are breaking up and reassigning the languages of the old Mafa branch (A.5) and Mandage (Kotoko) branch (B.1).

- Central Chadic
  - South
    - South
      - Bata (A.8)
        - Bata Proper: Bacama, Bata, Fali, Gude, Gudu, Holma (†), Jimi, Ngwaba (from A.1 Tera), Nzanyi, Sharwa
        - Tsuvan: Tsuvan, Zizilivakan
      - Daba (A.7)
        - Daba Proper: Daba, Mazagway Hidi
        - Mina: Mina, Mbudum
        - Buwal: Buwal, Gavar
      - Mafa (= South A.5 Mafa (d)): Mafa, Mefele, Cuvok
      - Tera (A.1):
        - East Tera: Boga, Ga'anda, Hwana
        - (West Tera): Jara, Tera
      - Sukur (A.6)
  - Hurza
    - Hurza (from A.5 Mafa): Vame, Mbuko
  - North
    - Margi–Mandara–Mofu
      - Margi (A.2)
        - Bura: Bura, Cibak, Putai, Nggwahyi
        - Margi Proper: Kilba, Margi South, Margi
      - Mandara (A.4):
        - Wandala: Mandara (Malgwa), Glavda
        - Dghwede: Cineni, Dghwede, Guduf, Gava, Gvoko
        - Podoko: Podoko, Matal (from A.5 Mafa)
      - Mofu (part of South A.5 Mafa)
        - Tokombere: Ouldeme, Mada, Muyang, Molokwo
        - Meri: Zulgo, Gemzek, Merey, Dugwor
        - Mofu Proper: Mofu North, Mofu-Gudur
    - Maroua
      - Maroua (part of South A.5 Mafa (c)): Giziga North, Giziga South, Mbazla
    - Lamang
      - Lamang (West A.4 Wandala): Lamang, Hdi, Mabas
    - Higi
      - Higi (A.3): Bana, Hya, Psikyɛ, Kamwe, Kirya-Konzel
    - Musgum – North Kotoko
      - Kotoko Island: Buduma
      - Kotoko North: Mpade, Afaɗə, Malgbe, Maltam
      - Musgum (B.2): Musgum, Mbara, Muskum (†)
    - Kotoko Centre
      - Kotoko Centre: Lagwan, Mser
    - Kotoko South
      - Kotoko South: Zina, Mazera
    - Gidar

Jilbe was not classified, as no sources were available.

=== Blench (2006) ===
The branches of Biu–Mandara traditionally go by either names or letters and numbers in an outline format. Blench (2006) organizes them as follows:

- Biu–Mandara
  - Tera (A.1): Tera, Pidlimdi (Hinna), Jara, Ga'anda, Gabin, Boga, Ngwaba, Hwana
  - Bura–Higi
    - Bura (A.2): Bura-Pabir (Bura), Cibak (Kyibaku), Nggwahyi, Huba (Kilba), Putai (Marghi West), Marghi Central (Margi, Margi Babal), Marghi South
    - ? Kofa
    - Higi (A.3): Kamwə (Psikyɛ, Higi), Bana, Hya, ? Kirya-Konzəl
  - Wandala–Mafa
    - Wandala (Mandara) (A.4)
      - East: Wandala (Mura, Mandara, Malgwa), Glavda (Gəlvaxdaxa)
      - Parəkwa (Podoko)
      - West: Gəvoko, Guduf-Gava (Cineni), Dghweɗe, Hdi (Xədi, Hedi, Tur), Lamang, Woga, Vemgo, Mabas
      - Sukur (Sakwun, A.6)
    - Mafa (A.5)
      - Northeast Mafa: Vame (Pəlasla), Mbuko, Gaduwa
      - Matal (Muktele)
      - South Mafa
        - (a) Wuzlam (Ouldémé), Muyang, Maɗa, Məlokwo
        - (b) Zəlgwa-Minew, Gemzek, Ɗugwor, Mikere, Merey
        - (c) North Giziga, South Giziga, North Mofu, Mofu-Gudur (South Mofu), Baldemu (Mbazlam)
        - (d) Cuvok, Mafa, Mefele, Shügule
  - Daba (A.7)
    - North Daba: Buwal (Gadala), Gavar (Kortchi)
    - South Daba: Mina (Besleri, Hina), Daba (Mazagway), Mbədam
  - Bata (Gbwata) (A.8): Bacama, Bata (Gbwata), Sharwa, Tsuvan, Gude, Fali of Mubi, Zizilivakan (Ulan Mazhilvən, Fali of Jilbu), Jimi (Jimjimən), Gudu, Holma (†), Nzanyi
  - Mandage (Kotoko) (B.1)
    - South Mandage: Msər (Kousseri), Lagwan (Logone)
    - ? Jilbe
    - North Mandage: Afaɗə, Maslam, Malgbe (Gulfey), Mpadə
  - Buduma (Yedina)
  - East–Central
    - Gidar (Kaɗa)
    - Munjuk (B.2): Mbara, Muskum (Muzuk) (†), Mpus, Beege (Jafga), Vulum (Mulwi)
    - Mida'a (< B.1): Jina, Majəra

=== Newman (1977) ===
Central Chadic classification per Newman (1977):

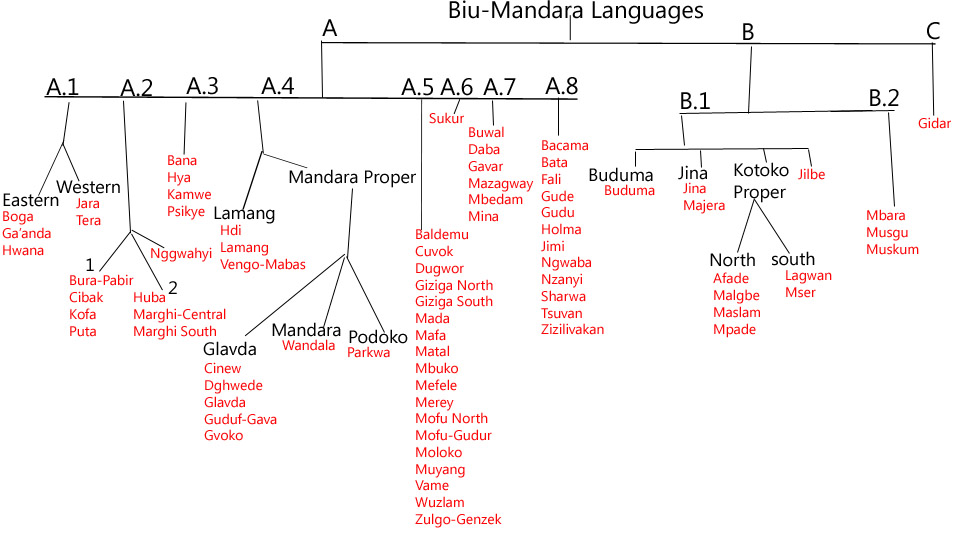

== Names and locations (Nigeria) ==
Below is a list of language names, populations, and locations (in Nigeria only) from Blench (2019).

Distributions of Biu–Mandara branches in Nigeria
Branch	Code	Primary locations
Tera	A1	Gombi LGA, Adamawa State and Biu LGA, Borno State
Bata	A8	Mubi LGA, Adamawa State
Higi	A3	Michika LGA, Adamawa State
Mandara	A4	Gwoza LGA, Borno State and Michika LGA, Adamawa State

=== South ===
Language	Branch	Cluster	Dialects	Alternate spellings	Own name for language	Endonym(s)	Other names (location-based)	Other names for language	Exonym(s)	Speakers	Location(s)	Notes
Daba	Daba				Daba					A single village, less than 1,000. Mostly in Cameroun	Adamawa State, Mubi LGA. Between Mubi and Bahuli	
Mafa	Mafa		Mafa (Mofa) in Nigeria. Cameroon dialects divided into West, Central and Eastern.	Mofa					Matakam (not recommended)	2,000 (1963), 136,000 in Cameroon (1982 SIL)	Borno State, Gwoza LGA; mainly in Cameroon	
Sakun	Sukur				Sakun, Gemasakun	Gә̀mà Sákún	Sugur	Adikummu Sukur		5,000 (1952); 10,000 (1973 SIL). 7 villages	Adamawa State, Madgali LGA	
Ga’anda cluster	Tera	Ga’anda			Tlәka’andata pl. Ka’andәca	Kaɓәn		Mokar [name of the place where the rolling pot stopped]		7,600 (1952); 10,000 (1973 SIL);␣4. Six villages	Adamawa State, Gombi LGA	
Kaɓәn	Tera	Ga’anda		Gabin	Tlәkaɓәnɗa pl. Kaɓәnca					12 villages		
Fәrtata	Tera	Ga’anda			Tlәfәrtata pl. Fәrtaca					5 villages		
Boga	Tera			Boka						5 villages	Adamawa State, Gombi LGA	
Hwana	Tera			Hona, Hwona						6,604 (1952 W&B); 20,000 (1973 SIL), estimate more than 20,000 (Blench 1987)	Adamawa State, Gombi LGA, Guyuk and 30 other villages	
Jara	Tera			Jera						4,000 (SIL)	Borno State, Biu LGA; Bauchi State, Ako LGA	Also refers to the languages of the Jarawan Bantu group including: the Jarawa cluster, Mbárù, Gùra, Rúhû, Gubi, Dulbu, Láb􀬎̀r, Kulung, and Gwa
Tera cluster	Tera	Tera								46,000 (SIL); 50,000 (Newman 1970)	Borno State, Biu LGA; Gombe State, Gombi LGA, Kwami district, Ako LGA, Yamaltu and Ako districts, Dukku LGA, Funakaye district	
Nyimatli	Tera	Tera	Wuyo-Ɓalɓiya-Waɗe; Deba-Zambuk-Hina-Kalshingi-Kwadon [orthography based on this cluster]	Yamaltu, Nimalto, Nyemathi							Gombe State, Ako, Gombe, Kwami, Funakai, Yamaltu LGAs; Borno State, Ɓayo LGA	
Pidlimdi	Tera	Tera						Hinna, Hina, Ghәna			Borno State, Biu LGA	
Bura Kokura	Tera	Tera									Borno State, Biu LGA	
Boga	Tera, Eastern			Boka							Adamawa State, Gombi LGA	
Bata cluster	Bata	Bata										
Bwatye	Bata	Bata	Mulyen (Mwulyin), Dong, Opalo, Wa-Duku	Gboare, Bwatiye	Kwaa–Ɓwaare	Ɓwaare			Bachama	11,250 (1952) 20,000 (1963)	Adamawa State, Numan and Guyuk LGAs, Kaduna State, north east of Kaduna town. Bacama fishermen migrate long distances down the Benue River, with camps as far as the Benue/Niger confluence.	
Bata	Bata	Bata	Koboci, Kobotschi (Kobocĩ, Wadi, Zumu (Jimo), Malabu, Bata of Ribaw, Bata of Demsa, Bata of Garoua, Jirai	Batta, Gbwata						26,400 (1952), est. 2,000 in Cameroon; 39,000 total (1971 Welmers)	Adamawa State, Numan, Song, Fufore and Mubi LGAs; also in Cameroon	
Fali cluster	Bata	Fali					Fali of Mubi, Fali of Muchella		Vimtim, Yimtim	4 principal villages. Estimate of more than 20,000 (1990)	Adamawa State, Mubi LGA	
Vin	Bata	Fali			Uroovin	Uvin	Vimtim				Vimtim town, north of Mubi	
Huli	Bata	Fali		Bahuli	Urahuli	Huli, Hul					Bahuli town, northeast of Mubi	
Madzarin	Bata	Fali			Ura Madzarin	Madzarin	Muchella				Muchella town, northeast of Mubi	
Ɓween	Bata	Fali			Uramɓween	Cumɓween	Bagira				Bagira town, northeast of Mubi	
Gudu	Bata			Gutu, Gudo						1,200 (LA 1971)	Adamawa State, Song LGA, 120 km. west of Song. Approximately 5 villages.	
Guɗe	Bata			Gude, Goudé			Mubi	Cheke, Tcheke, Mapuda, Shede, Tchade, Mapodi, Mudaye, Mocigin, Motchekin		28,000 (1952), est. 20,000 in Cameroon	Adamawa State, Mubi LGA; Borno State, Askira–Uba LGA; and in Cameroon	
Holma	Bata			Holma	Da Holmaci	Bali Holma				4 speakers (Blench, 1987). The language has almost vanished and has been replaced by Fulfulde.	Adamawa State. Spoken north of Sorau on the Cameroon border	
Ngwaba	Bata								Gombi, Goba	Fewer than 1000	Adamawa State, Gombi LGA, at Fachi and Gudumiya	
Nzanyi	Bata		Paka, Rogede (Rɨgudede), Nggwoli, Hoode, Maiha, Magara, Dede, Mutidi; and Lovi in Cameroon	Njanyi, Njai, Njei, Zany, Nzangi, Zani, Njeny, Jeng, Njegn, Njeng,		Nzangɨ sg., Nzanyi pl.	Jenge, Jeng, Mzangyim, Kobochi, Kobotshi	1.B Wur Nzanyi		14,000 in Nigeria (1952), 9,000 in Cameroon.	Nigeria: Adamawa State, Maiha LGA. Cameroon: West of Dourbeye near Nigerian border in Doumo region, Mayo-Oulo Subdivision, Mayo-Louti Division, North Province.	
Zizilivәkan	Bata				Zilivә	ÀmZírív	Fali of Jilbu			‘a few hundred’ in Cameroon	Adamawa State, Mubi LGA, Jilbu town; and in Cameroon	

=== North ===
Language	Branch	Cluster	Dialects	Alternate spellings	Own name for language	Endonym(s)	Other names (location-based)	Other names for language	Exonym(s)	Speakers	Location(s)	Notes
Huba	Bura		Luwa	Hәba	Huba	Huba	Chobba Kilba			32,000 (1952); 100,000 (1980 UBS)	Adamawa State, Hong, Maiha, Mubi and Gombi LGAs	
Margi	Bura		Central: Margi babal = ‘Margi of the Plain’ around Lasa, Margi Dzәrŋu = ‘Margi near the Hill öu’ around Gulak; Gwàrà; Mə̀lgwí (Mulgwe, Molgheu); Wúrgà (Urga); South Margi is counted as a separate language and is more closely related to Huba	Marghi, Margyi	Màrgí	Màrgí				For Margi, Margi South and Putai: 135,000 (1955); 200,000 (1987 UBS)	Borno State, Askira–Uba and Damboa LGAs; Adamawa State, Madagali, Mubi and Michika LGAs	
Nggwahyi	Bura			Ngwaxi, Ngwohi						One village	Borno State, Askira–Uba LGA	
Putai	Bura							Margi West	Margi Putai = ‘West Margi’, Margi of Minthla	Language dying out, but ethnic population large	Borno State, Damboa LGA	
Margi South	Bura		Wamdiu, Hildi						Margi ti ntәm	For Margi, Margi South and Putai: 135,000 (1955)	Borno State, Askira–Uba LGA; Adamawa State, Mubi and Michika LGAs	Hoffmann (1963) relates the language of Margi South to Huba rather than to Margi.
Bura–Pabir	Bura		Bura Pela (Hill Bura), Bura Hyil Hawul (Plains Bura)	Bourrah, Burra, Babir, Babur	Mya Bura	Two peoples with one language: the Bura and the Pabir	Kwojeffa, Huve, Huviya			72,200 (1952 W&B), 250,000 (1987 UBS)	Borno State, Biu and Askira–Uba LGAs	
Cibak	Bura			Chibak, Chibuk, Chibbuk, Chibbak, Kyibaku, Kibaku		Cíbɔ̀k, Kikuk				20,000 (1973 SIL)	Borno State, Damboa LGA, south of Damboa town	
Kamwe	Higi		Nkafa, Dakwa (Bazza), Sәna, Wula, Futu, Tili Pte, Kapsiki (Ptsәkɛ) in Cameroon		Vәcәmwe				Higi, Hiji, Kapsiki	64,000 (1952); 180,000 (1973 SIL) est. 23,000 in Cameroon	Adamawa State, Michika LGA and into Cameroon	
Mukta	Higi	Kamwe		Mukta						Mukta village	Adamawa State	
Kirya-Konzәl cluster	Higi	Kirya-Konzәl							Fali		Adamawa State, Michika LGA.	
Kirya	Higi	Kirya-Konzәl			myá Kákíryà	ndá Kákìryà pl. Kákìryà			Fali of Kiriya	7,000 est. 2007. Kirya: 13 villages		
Konzәl	Higi	Kirya-Konzәl			myá Kónzә̀l	ndá Kónzә̀l pl. Kónzә̀l			Fali of Mijilu	9000 est. 2007. Konzәl: 15 villages		
Cinene	Mandara			Cinene		Cinene				3200 (Kim 2001)	Borno State, Gwoza LGA, east of Gwoza town in the mountains. 5 villages.	
Dghweɗe	Mandara			Dghwede, Hude, Johode, Dehoxde, Tghuade, Toghwede, Traude	Dghwéɗè			Azaghvana, Wa’a, Zaghvana		19,000 (1963), 7,900 (TR 1970), 30,000 (1980 UBS)	Borno State, Gwoza LGA	
Guduf–Cikide cluster	Mandara	Guduf–Cikide							Afkabiye (Lamang)	21,300 (1963)	Borno State, Gwoza LGA, east of Gwoza town in the mountains. Six main villages.	
Guduf	Mandara	Guduf–Cikide	Guduf, Cikide (Chikide)			Kәdupaxa			Ɓuxe, Gbuwhe, Latәghwa (Lamang), Lipedeke (Lamang). Also applied to Dghwede.			
Gava	Mandara	Guduf–Cikide		Gawa		Kәdupaxa			Linggava, Ney Laxaya, Yaghwatadaxa, Yawotataxa, Yawotatacha, Yaxmare, Wakura			
Cikide	Mandara	Guduf–Cikide		Cikide		Cikide						
Gvoko	Mandara			Gәvoko			Ngoshe Ndaghang, Ngweshe Ndhang, Nggweshe		Ngoshe Sama	2,500 (1963); 4,300 (1973 SIL); estimated more than 20,000 (1990)	Borno State, Gwoza LGA; Adamawa State, Michika LGA	
Lamang cluster	Mandara	Lamang		Laamang			Waha			15,000 (TR 1970), 40,000 (1963)		
Zaladva	Mandara	Lamang	Zaladeva (Alataghwa), Dzuuɓa (Dzuuba), Lәghva (Lughva), Gwózà Wakane (Gwozo)	Zәlәdvә			Lamang North				Borno State, Gwoza LGA	
Ghumbagha	Mandara	Lamang	Hә̀ɗkàlà (Xәdkala, Hidkala, Hitkala), Waga (Wagga, Woga, Waha)				Lamang Central				Borno State, Gwoza LGA; Adamawa State, Michika LGA;	
Ghudavan	Mandara	Lamang		Ghudeven, Ghudәvәn			Lamang South				Borno State, Gwoza LGA; Adamawa State, Michika LGA; and in Cameroon	
Glavda	Mandara		Ngoshe (Ngweshe)	Galavda, Glanda, Gelebda, Gәlәvdә					Wakura	20,000 (1963); 2,800 in Cameroon (1982 SIL)	Borno State, Gwoza LGA; also in Cameroon	
Hdi	Mandara			Hidé, Hide, Xide, Xedi	Xәdi		Gra, Tur, Turu, Tourou, Ftour				Borno State, Gwoza LGA; Adamawa State, Michika LGA; and in Cameroon	
Vemgo–Mabas cluster	Mandara	Vemgo–Mabas										
Vemgo	Mandara	Vemgo–Mabas									Borno State, Gwoza LGA; Adamawa State, Michika LGA; and in Cameroon	
Mabas	Mandara	Vemgo–Mabas								A single village on the Nigeria/Cameroon frontier	Adamawa State, Michika LGA. 10 km. S.E. of Madagali	
Wandala cluster	Mandara	Wandala		Mandara, Ndara						19,300 in Nigeria (1970); 23,500 in Cameroon (1982 SIL)	Borno State. Bama, Gwoza LGAs.	
Wandala	Mandara	Wandala				Wandala	Mandara			Used as a vehicular language in this locality of Nigeria and Cameroon		
Mura	Mandara	Wandala				Mura	Mora, Kirdi Mora			An archaic form of Wandala spoken by non–Islamized populations	Uncertain if Mura is spoken in Nigeria	
Malgwa	Mandara	Wandala	Gwanje			Mәlgwa			Malgo, Gamargu, Gamergu	10,000 (TR 1970)	Borno State, Damboa, Gwoza and Konduga LGAs	
Afaɗә	Mandage			Afade, Affade, Afadee	Afaɗә		Kotoko, Mogari			Twelve villages in Nigeria, estimate Fewer than 20,000 (1990)	Borno State, Ngala LGA; and in Cameroon	
Jilbe	Mandage					Jilbe				? 100 speakers (Tourneux p.c. 1999)	Borno State, a single village on the Nigeria Cameroon border, south of Dikwa	
Yedina	Yedina		Yedina, Kuri (not in Nigeria)	Yídә́nà					Buduma	20,000 in Chad; 25,000 total (1987 SIL)	Borno State, islands of Lake Chad and mostly in Chad	

== Numerals ==
Comparison of numerals in individual languages:

Classification	Language	1	2	3	4	5	6	7	8	9	10
A, A.1, Eastern	Boga (Boka)	ɨrtà	cə̀p	məkkən	fwəɗà	ɗurmən	tyɛ̀xxɛɬ	mwut	fwotfwə̀ɗà (2 x 4)	hàhìrta (10–1)	kum
A, A.1, Eastern	Ga'anda	ar̃ta (r̃ is a trill)	sur̃r̃i	mahkə̀n	fwəɗà	ɗɨrmən	mɪca	mwùt(n)	fwətfwəɗà (2 x 4)	wə̀nhəhəʔar̃tà (10–1) ?	kum
A, A.1, Eastern	Hwana (Hwona)	tìtal	suɣurì	maxə̀n	faɗà	tuf(ù)	mɪ̀ki	mɨɗ(u)	(w)ùvwəɗà (2 x 4)	wùtàrè (10–1) ?	ɡumdìɗi / kum
A, A.1, Western	Tera (1)	dà / da	rāp / rap	kúnúŋ / kununɡ	vàt / vat	qúrmún / qurmun	ⁿjòŋ / njoŋ	mút / mut	mʲāsī / myaasi	mɨ̄ɮām / mu̠dlam	ɡʷàŋ / ɡwanɡ
A, A.1, Western	Tera (2)	da	rab	kunuk	fad	ɠurmun	njoŋ	mut	miyasi	milam	ɡwan
A, A.2	Nggwahyi (Ngwaxi)	tə̀ŋ	sɪɗà	makùr̃	fwə̀r̃	tufù	nkwɔ̀	mur̃fà	ncis	mɪða	kuma
A, A.2, 1	Bura (Bura-Pabir) (1)	ntànɡ	sùɗà	màkə̀r	fwàr	ntìfù	nkwà	mùrfà	cìsù	ùmðlà	kùmà
A, A.2, 1	Bura (Bura-Pabir) (2)	ntaŋ	suɗà	makùr̃	fwar̃	ntufù	ŋ̀kwà	murfà	ncɨsù	ḿðà	kuma
A, A.2, 1	Cibak (Bura-Pabir)	tə̀ŋ / patù / dukù	sudæ̀	makùr̃	fwòɗu	tufù	ŋ̀kwà	murɨfwæ̀	ntsisù	mɨðæ	kuma
A, A.2, 1	Putai (West Margi)	duku / təŋ / duɡu	suɗà / fɨɗɛ̀	makùr	fɔɗu / fwoɗu	tufù	kwa / kwɔ̀	muɗufā / muɗɨfɛ̀	cisù / ncɪsù	ḿðà / mðɛ̀	kuma / kumɛ
A, A.2, 2	Huba (Kilba)	dzàŋ	mətlù	màkə̀r / màkərù	fòɗù	tùfù	kwà	məɗəfà	cìsù	dlà	kùmà / kùm
A, A.2, 2	Central Marghi	taŋ / paɬu / tɪtɨkù	mɨɬù / sɪɗàŋ	makùr̃	fwoɗù	ntɪfù	ŋ̀kwà	mɪɗɪfù	ntsisù	ḿðù	kumu
A, A.3	Bana (1)	tánə̀	bákə̀	máhə̀kánə̀	fáɗə̀	cífə̀	kwáŋ	bə̀rfàŋ	də̀ɣə̀sə̀	mə̀ɬísɗə̀	mə̀ŋ
A, A.3	Bana (2)	kwətiŋ	bakə	mahkan	faɗə	cifə	kwaŋ	mbərfəŋ	dəghəs	məsliɗ	məŋ
A, A.3	Hya (Higi Ghye)	paðɛ / tanɛ	ɓaɡɛ	màŋkɛ	fwaɗɛ	wcivi	kwaŋəy	mbùr̃ùfəŋəy	tùɡùzi	wɨɬti	mùŋəy
A, A.3	Kafa (1)	ʔìkkòó	ɡùttòó	kèèmó	áwùddò	ʔùùttʃòó	ʃírìttòó	ʃábààttòó	ʃímìttòó	jììtʼijòó	ààʃìròó
A, A.3	Kafa (2)	ʔikko	ɡutto	keemo	ʔauddo	ʔuutʃtʃo	ʃiritto	ʃabaatto	ʃimitto	jiitʼijo	ʔaaʃiro
A, A.3	Kafa (3)	ʔikko	ɡutto	keemo	auddo	uuččo	širitto	šabaatto	šimitto	yiitʼtʼio	aaširo
A, A.3	Kwame (Fali of Kiria)	ɡutàn / tanəy	ɓwukuʔ	màkun(u)	fwaɗùʔ	(w)cɪfuʔ	ŋkwaŋ	mbùrùfūŋ	tùɣùsùʔ	ǹwɬti(ʔyì)	ɡwùm(ù)
A, A.3	Psikye (Kapsiki)	kwetɛŋe	bake	mahekene	wəfaɗe	mcɛfe	ŋkwaŋe	mberefaŋe	deɡhese	mesli	meŋe
A, A.4, Lamang	Hadi (Hdi)	tèkw	hìs	hə̀kə̀n	fwáɗ	hùtáf	mə̀kúʔ	ndə̀fáŋ	tə̀ɣás	tə̀mbáy / timbe	ɣwàŋ
A, A.4, Lamang	Lamang	tíuwá / tálá	χésá	χ̀kə́ná	ùfáɗá	χẁtáfá	m̀kwá / m̀kuwá	ə̀lfáŋá	tə̀ɣásá	tə̀mbáyá	ɣwáŋá
A, A.4, Lamang	Vemgo-Mabas	pál / tékw	hés	xə̀kə̀n	úfáɗ	xútáf	ŋ́ku	lə̀fàŋ	tə̀ɣàs	tə̀mbàj	ɣə̀wàŋ
A, A.4, Mandara Proper, Glavda	Cinene	pàlà	bùʷà	xə̀kə̀rɗà	ùfàɗà	ɮɨ̀ɓà	ŋkʷàxà	ùɗifà	tə̀ɣsà	vaslambàɗà	klawà
A, A.4, Mandara Proper, Glavda	Dghwede	tɨtɨkwì, tekwè	micè	xəkùrè	fiɗì	ðiɓi	ŋ́kwe	wuɗìfi	təɣə̀še / təxəse	təmbə̀	ɣwàŋɡa
A, A.4, Mandara Proper, Glavda	Glavda	páll	bwa	xkərɗ	ufáɗ	ɮəɓ	ŋkwax	uɗif	tə́xs	vaslambaɗ	klàáwá
A, A.4, Mandara Proper, Glavda	Guduf-Gava	tekʷè / kitakʷè	mitsè	xəkərɗè	ùfəɗè	ɮɨ̀ɓè	ŋkʷaxè	ùɗifè	tə̀ɣəsè	vaslambàɗè	kuləkè
A, A.4, Mandara Proper, Glavda	Gvoko	palò / tekò	xecò	xəkʷarò	fwaɗò	ɮaʔò	ŋkoyò	ntfaŋɡò	tə̀ɣasò	tɨ̀mbayò	ɣʷaŋɡò
A, A.4, Mandara Proper, Mandara	Wandala (Malgwa)	pálle	búwa	kəɠyé	ufáɗe	iiɮəbé	unkwé	vúye	tiise	másə́lmane	kəláwa
A, A.4, Mandara Proper, Podoko	Podoko	kutəra	səra	makəra	ufaɗa	zlama	məkuwa	maɗəfa	za	metɨrəce	jɨma
A, A.5	Cuvok (Tchouvok) (1)	ámə̀tà	át͡ʃèw	máákàr	fáɗ	ɮám	máákwà	tásə̀là	t͡ʃáákàr	t͡ʃʉ́ɗ	kùràw
A, A.5	Cuvok (Tchouvok) (2)	amta, mta	ɛt͡ʃəw	maakar	faɗ	ɮam	makwa	tasəla	tsaakar	t͡ʃyɗ	kuraw
A, A.5	Dugwor	bek	səla	makar	məfaɗ	zlam	mukwa	tsela	tsaamakar	tseuɗ	kurow
A, A.5	Zulgo-Gemzek	ilík	súla	màkər	əfáɗ	ə̀zləm	ndílík	təsəlá	tsàmàkə̀r	tswíɗ	kúrwá
A, A.5	North Giziga	ɓlà	cêw	màːkàr	m̀fàɗ	ɮòm	mérkêɗ	tàːrnà	dàːɡàfàɗ	nɡòltêr	krô
A, A.5	South Giziga	plá	cúw	máakə̀r	mə̀fáɗ	ɮúm	mérkéɗ	tàrnà	dàaŋɡàfáɗ (2 x 4) ?	nɡòltír	kúrú
A, A.5	Mada	ftek	séla	mahkaɾ	wfaàë	zzlaèm	mokkoà	slaasélaà	slalahkaàr	oàboèlmboè	dzmoèkw
A, A.5	Mafa	sə́táɗ	cew / cecew	makár	fáɗ	zlám	mokwa	tsáraɗ	tsamakaɗ	cœ́ɗ	kula
A, A.5	Matal (1)	dì / tēkùlā	sɨ̄là	màkɨ̀r	ùfàɗ	ɨ̀ɮù	mùkʷā	mɨ̀ɗɨf	m̀tìɡìʃ	làdɨ̀ɡà	kùlù
A, A.5	Matal (2)	dìì / tékùlá	sə̀là	mákə̀r	úfàɗ	ə́ɮùw	mə̀kwá	mə̀də̀f	mə̀tə̀ɡìʃ	ládə̀ɡá	kùlù
A, A.5	Mbuko	kərtek	tsew	maakaŋ	fuɗo	ɗara	mbərka	tsuwɓe	dzəmaakaŋ	dəsuɗo	kuro
A, A.5	Mefele	mə̀tá	cécèw	màhkár	fwàɗ	ɮàm	mòkwá	tsə̀làɗ	t͡ʃáhkàr	t͡ʃʉ́ɗ	dùmbók
A, A.5	Merey	nə̀tê	súlò	màkàr	fàɗ	ɮàm	m̀kô	tàsə́là	tsàːmàːkàr	cö̂ɗ	krôw
A, A.5	Mofu-Gudur	teɗ / ték (counting), pál (enumation)	t͡sew	máakar	məfaɗ	ɮam	maakwáw	maasála	daaŋɡafaɗ	ɮam-leték / ɮam-leteɗ	kúráw
A, A.5	North Mofu	nettey	suho	makar	fáɗ	ɮàm	mukó	taasə́lá	tsamakàŋ	tsəɗ	kuro
A, A.5	Moloko	bɪ̀lɛ́ŋ	tʃɛ́w	màkáɾ	ùfáɗ / mɔ̀fáɗ	ɮɔ̀m	mʊ̀kʷɔ̀	ʃɪ̀sɛ́ɾɛ́	ɬálákáɾ	hɔ́lɔ́mbɔ́	kʷʊ̀ɾɔ́
A, A.5	Muyang	bílìŋ	tʃỳ	màhkə̄r	fāɗ	ɮàm	mʊ̀kʷū	ādə́skə̄lā	āɮáláxkə̄r	āmbʊ́lmbō	krū
A, A.5	Ouldeme (Wuzlam)	ʃɛ̄lɛ́ŋ	brɛ̄tʃâw / tʃâw	mākár	mə̄fáɗ	ɮàm	mōkō	sə̄sə̄lā	fə̄rfáɗ	álɓìt	kōlō
A, A.5	Vame (Pelasla)	ɓìlɛ́	tʃâw	máŋɡàn	fúːɗàw	ɗáːrà	márkà	tʃíɓà	ʒíːrɛ̀	táhkɛ̀	dʒɛm
A, A.6	Sukur (1)	kə̀lí	bák	ma̋ken	fwáɗ	ɮám	mʊ́kwà	máɗáf	tə̀kə̀z	míçí / míɬí	ʔwàn
A, A.6	Sukur (2)	tá.í	bákʼ	máːkə̀n	fwáɗ	ɮám	mə́kkwà	máɗaf	tə́kkəz	məɬi	wàŋ
A, A.7	Buwal	tɛ́ŋɡʷʊ̄lɛ̀ŋ	ɡ͡bɑ́k	mɑ̄xkɑ́t̚	ŋ̀fɑ́t̚	dzɑ̄ɓɑ́n	ŋ̀ʷkʷɑ́x	ŋ̀ʃɪ́lɛ́t̚	dzɑ̄mɑ̄xkɑ̄t̚ (5 + 3)	dzɑ́fɑ́t̚ (5 + 4)	wɑ́m
A, A.7	Daba	takan	səray	makaɗ	faɗ	jeɓin	koh	cesireɗ	cəfaɗcəfaɗ (4 + 4)	dərfatakan (10–1)	ɡuɓ təɓa təɓa
A, A.7	Gavar	ŋ̀tɑ́t̚	ɡ͡bɑ̀k	mɑ̄xkɑ̀t̚	ŋ̀fɑ̄t̚	dzɑ̄ɓə̄n	ŋ̀kʷɑ́x	ŋ̀ʃɪ́lít̚	dzɑ̄mɑ̄xkɑ̄t̚ (5 + 3)	dzɑ́ŋfɑ́t̚ (5 + 4)	wɑ̄m
A, A.7	Mbedam	ntɑɗ	bɑk	mɑxkɑɗ	mfɑɗ	dʒəɓɑn	ŋkwɑx	diʃliɗ	dʒɑmɑxkɑɗ (5 + 3)	tsɑfɑɗ (5 + 4)	wɑm
A, A.7	Mina (Hina)	ǹtá	suloɗ	mahkaɗ	mfáɗ	dzəbuŋ	ǹkú	dìsùlùɗ	fáɗfáɗ (2 x 4)	varkanta	ɡə̀ɓ
A, A.8	Bacama (Bachama)	hiɗò	k͡pe	ḿwɔ̀kun	fwət	tuf	tukwə̀ltaka (5 + 1)	tukòluk͡pe (5 + 2)	fwɔ̂fwət (2 x 4)	ɗɔ̀mbiɗò (10–1)	bə̌w
A, A.8	Fali (Fali of Mucella)	tɛ̀n / ʔar̃mə	bek / buk	màxk(u)	fwəɗ	tuf	yiɗə̀w	mbùr̃fuŋ	tùɣus	mɪ̀ðɪŋ	ɡùm
A, A.8	Gude	tèen / rûŋ	bə̀ráʔy	màkk	ǹfwáɗ	tə́f	kùwà	mə̀ɗə̀f	tə̀ɣə́s	ìllíŋ	puʔ
A, A.8	Gudu (Gudo)	ǰə́ŋ	bœ̀k	māːkə́n	fwád	tùf	kwǎ	mīskàtā	fɔ̄rfwād (2 x 4)	žīɛ́tə́pə̀n	pú
A, A.8	Jimi (Mwulyen)	híɗò / tɛ̂n	búk / bíkə̌	mwàkɨ́n / maxkə́n	fwad / fwátʼ	túhf / tɯ́f	túkwàldèáká / bə̌rfǐŋ	túkwàlóʔpé / tɯ̀ʁɯ́s	fwáfwàɗ (2 x 4) / mìɮíɲ	táàmbíɗò / pó?	bù
A, A.8	Nzanyi	hɪɗè	buk	mɨ̀dɨfəl	fwət	tuf	kwɔx	mɨ̀skatə̀	fwəfwaɗè (2 x 4)	təmɓeɗè	pu
A, A.8	Zizilivakan	lɪm	sul	màxku	fwəy	mùxtyup	ŋ̀kwaʔ	mbùrfìŋ	tə̀ɣìs	mɨ̀ðì	ɡumù
B, B.1, Buduma	Buduma (Yedina)	ɡə̀tté	kí	ɡàkə́nnə́	híɡáy	híŋɟì	hə̀ràkkə́	tùlwár	wósə́kə́	hílíɡár	hákkán
B, B.1, Kotoko Proper, North	Afade	sə́rə̀jā	sɗā	ɡàrkə̀	ɡàɗē	ʃìʃí	və̀nārkə̄ (2 x 3)	kàtùl	vìyāɗē (2 x 4)	dìʃẽ̄	χkàn
B, B.1, Kotoko Proper, North	Mpade	pál	ɡāsì	ɡòkúrò	ɡāɗè	ʃénsī	ʃéskótē	túlùr < Kanuri	jìlìɡàɗè (2 x 4)	jìàtálà	kán
B, B.1, Kotoko Proper, South	Lagwan	sə́ɣdia, tkú	χsɗá	ɡǎχkər	ɡǎɗe	ʃēʃí	vɛnǎχkər / vɛnǎχəkər (2 x 3)	kátul	vɛɲáɗe (2 x 4)	diʔiʃén	χkan
B, B.2	Mbara	kítáy, ɗów	mòk	ùhú	púɗú	íɬím	ɬírá	mìɡzàk / mùɡizàk	mìsílày / mùsílày	wáːŋá	dòːɡò / dòk
B, B.2	Musgu	kítáy, ɗáw	súlú	hú	púɗú	ɬím	ɬàːrà	mìɡzàk / mùɡzàk	mìtwìs / mìtìs	tíklá	dòːɡò
C	Gidar	tákà	súlà	hókù	póɗò	ɬé	ɬré	bùhúl	dòdòpórò (2 x 4) ?	váyták (10–1) ?	kláù

== Proto Language ==
The phonology of Proto-Central Chadic consists of 31 consonants, three vowels and a morpheme-level palatalization prosody. The 3 vowel phonemes are /a/, /i/ and /ɨ/. The consonants are as follows:

Proto Biu-Mandara Consonants
		Bilabial	Alveolar	Laminal	Velar	Labiovelar
Nasal		m	n			
Stop	Voiceless	p	t	t͡s	k	kʷ
Stop	Voiced	(b)	d	d͡z	g	gʷ
Stop	Implosive	ɓ	ɗ			
Stop	Prenasalized	ᵐb	ⁿd	ⁿd͡z	(ᵑg)	(ᵑgʷ)
Fricative	Voiceless		ɬ	s	x	xʷ
Fricative	Voiced	v	ɮ	z	ɣ	ɣʷ
Trill			r			
Approximant				j		w
