= Lamang language =

Afro-Asiatic language of Nigeria

Lamang
- Native to: Nigeria
- Region: Borno, Adamawa
- Native speakers: (40,000 cited 1993)
- Language family: Afro-Asiatic: Chadic; Biu–Mandara; Wandala–Mafa; Wandala (A.4); West; Lamang
- Dialects: Dzuba; Hedkala; Ghudavan; Ghumbagha; Luhuva; Gwoza–Wakane; Waga (Waha)
- Writing system: Latin

Language codes
- ISO 639-3: hia
- Glottolog: lama1288

Lamang (Laamang) is an Afro-Asiatic language cluster of Nigeria. Blench (2006) classifies the Woga variety as a separate language.

== Phonology ==
Consonants

	Labial	Dental	Alveolar	Palatal/Velar	Labio-Velar	Glottal
Nasal	m		n	ŋ	ŋʷ	
Pre-nasal Plosive	^{m}b		^{n}d	^{ŋ}g	^{ŋ}gʷ	
Plosive	p b		t d	k g	kʷ gʷ	ʔ
Implosive	ɓ		ɗ			
Affricate			ts dz			
Fricative	f v	θ ð	s z	x ɣ	xʷ ɣʷ	
Approximant			l	j	w	

Vowels

The vowels are /a/, /e/, /i/, and /u/.

== Varieties ==
Blench (2019) lists these language varieties as are part of the Lamang cluster.

- Zaladva (Zәlәdvә) (Lamang North)
- Ghumbagha (Lamang Central)
- Ghudavan (Lamang South)
