= Hile-Alifa =

Village in the Far North Region, Cameroon

Coordinates: 12°42′N 14°19′E

- Commune and town
- Interactive map of Hile-Alifa
- Country: Cameroon
- Time zone: UTC+1 (WAT)

Hile-Alifa is a town and commune in the Far North Region, Cameroon.

== See also ==
- Communes of Cameroon
