= Mefele language =

Afro-Asiatic language spoken in Cameroon

Mefele
- Native to: Cameroon
- Region: Far North Province
- Native speakers: 11,000 (2002)
- Language family: Afro-Asiatic: Chadic; Biu–Mandara; Wandala–Mafa; Mafa (A.5); South (c); Mefele

Language codes
- ISO 639-3: mfj
- Glottolog: mefe1242

Mefele is an Afro-Asiatic language spoken in northern Cameroon. Dialects are Mefele, Muhura, Serak, and Shugule. Blench (2006) considers Shugule (Shügule) a separate language.

== Names ==
The speakers of the Mefele language (more than 10,000 speakers) are often included with the Mafa people by the Cameroonian government. However, they themselves do not call themselves Mafa, and the Mafa often refer to them as Bélahay (hay is a plural marker), which is often mentioned in the literature as Boulahay.

== Distribution ==
The Mefele area is divided into two areas separated by the town of Mokolo, which is dominated by the Mafa. The Mefele live in parts of the town of Mokolo (commune of Mokolo, department of Mayo-Tsanaga, Far North Region). The larger Mefele area is in the south and southeast and includes the villages of Sirak and Mouhour. The smaller Mefele area, 10 km to the northwest, includes the village of Sougoulé. Most of the Mefele (probably the children to a lesser extent) understand and speak Mafa, and so are generally bilingual in Mafa.
