= Jara language =

Chadic language spoken in Nigeria

Jara
- Native to: Nigeria
- Region: Borno and Gombei States, Biu, Kwaya-Kusar, Akko and Yamaltu-Deba LGAs.
- Native speakers: (46,000 cited 2000)
- Language family: Afro-Asiatic: Chadic; Biu–Mandara; Tera (A.1); Jara

Language codes
- ISO 639-3: jaf
- Glottolog: jara1274

Jara, also known as Jera, is a Nigerian language reported to be spoken by 46,000 people in 2000. It is spoken in Borno and Gombe States, in the Biu, Kwaya-Kusar, Akko, and Yamaltu-Deba LGAs. It is an Afro-Asiatic language, in the Biu–Mandara branch of Chadic family. Use of Jara is declining; it is being displaced by Fulfulde and Hausa.
