= North Mofu language =

Chadic language spoken in Cameroon

North Mofu
- Native to: Cameroon
- Region: Far North Province
- Native speakers: (28,000 cited 1982)
- Language family: Afro-Asiatic: Chadic; Biu–Mandara; Wandala–Mafa; Mafa (A.5); South (c); North Mofu

Language codes
- ISO 639-3: mfk
- Glottolog: nort3046

North Mofu is an Afro-Asiatic language spoken in northern Cameroon. Dialects are Douroun and Wazan.

There is no specific glossonym (language name) covering the very close languages of the Douroum, Wazang and Douvangar massifs, nor is there a corresponding ethnonym; the speakers simply refer to themselves as "mountain people", specifying the massif when necessary. In fact, Mofu is not recognized by the speakers of these languages, except for those of a southern clan, the Mofaw [mofaw].

Douvangar Mofu (North Mofu) is spoken in the massifs located from the south of Meri to the Tsanaga River (cantons of Douvangar, Dourourn, and Ouazzang of the commune of Meri, department of Diamaré, Far North Region) by 27,500 speakers.
