= Nggwahyi language =

Chadic language of Nigeria

Nggwahyi
- Native to: Nigeria
- Region: Borno State
- Native speakers: (2,000 cited 1995)
- Language family: Afro-Asiatic: Chadic; Biu–Mandara; Bura–Higi; Bura (A.2); Nggwahyi

Language codes
- ISO 639-3: ngx
- Glottolog: nggw1242
- ELP: Nggwahyi
- Linguasphere: 18-GBB-b

Nggwahyi (Ngwaxi, Ngwohi) is a minor Chadic language of Nigeria. Nggwahyi is considered a threatened language.
