= Fali of Mubi =

Chadic dialect cluster spoken in Nigeria

Fali
- Fali of Mubi
- Native to: Nigeria
- Region: Adamawa State
- Native speakers: 25,000 (2010)
- Language family: Afro-Asiatic: Chadic; Biu–Mandara; Bata (A.8); Fali
- Dialects: Uroovin (Fali of Vimtim); Bahuli (Fali of Bahuli); Madzarin (Fali of Muchalla); Uramɓwiin (Fali of Bagira)

Language codes
- ISO 639-3: fli
- Glottolog: fali1285

Fali, or Fali of Mubi after the local city, is a Chadic dialect cluster spoken in Nigeria, in Adamawa State in the Mubi North, Mubi South and Michika Local Government Areas. It is one of several languages in the area that go by the generic name Fali. Fali people are strong people of rich cultural heritage and values. Their main source of income comes from farming. There are more than 250,000 estimated native speakers of the dialect as of 2020.

Nigeria's former Chief of Defence Staff, Late Air Marshal Alex Badeh was a Fali man who hailed from Muvudi, Vimtim.

== Varieties ==
Varieties are:

- Ɓween (Bagira). Autonyms Uramɓween (language), Cumɓween (people)
- Huli (Bahuli). Autonyms Urahuli (language), Huli, Hul (people)
- Madzarin (Muchalla). Autonyms Ura Madzarin (language), Madzarin (people)
- Vin (Vimtim). Autonyms Uroovin (language), Uvin (people)
