= Gudu language =

Chadic language spoken in Nigeria

Gudu
- Native to: Nigeria
- Region: Adamawa State
- Native speakers: (5,000 cited 1993)
- Language family: Afro-Asiatic: Chadic; Biu–Mandara; Bata (A.8); Gudu

Language codes
- ISO 639-3: gdu
- Glottolog: gudu1250

Gudu (also known as Gudo, Gutu) is an Afro-Asiatic language spoken in Nigeria in Adamawa State in the Song LGA. Kumbi is a dialect.
