= Mbara language (Chad) =

Chadic language of Chad

Mbara
- G’kelendeg
- Native to: Chad
- Native speakers: (1,000 cited 1986)
- Language family: Afro-Asiatic: Chadic; Biu–Mandara; East–Central; Munjuk (B.2); Mbara

Language codes
- ISO 639-3: mpk
- Glottolog: mbar1260
- ELP: Mbara (Chad)

Mbara is an endangered Chadic (Biu–Mandara) language of Chad.
