= Acetyl-S-ACP:malonate ACP transferase =

Class of enzymes

Identifiers
- EC no.: 2.3.1.187

Databases
- IntEnz: IntEnz view
- BRENDA: BRENDA entry
- ExPASy: NiceZyme view
- KEGG: KEGG entry
- MetaCyc: metabolic pathway
- PRIAM: profile
- PDB structures: RCSB PDB PDBe PDBsum
Search
- PMC: articles
- PubMed: articles
- NCBI: proteins

Acetyl-S-ACP:malonate ACP transferase (EC 2.3.1.187, acetyl-S-ACP:malonate ACP-SH transferase, acetyl-S-acyl-carrier protein:malonate acyl-carrier-protein-transferase, MdcA, MadA, ACP transferase, malonate/acetyl-CoA transferase, malonate:ACP transferase, acetyl-S-acyl carrier protein:malonate acyl carrier protein-SH transferase) is an enzyme with systematic name acetyl-(acyl-carrier-protein):malonate S-(acyl-carrier-protein)transferase. This enzyme catalyses the following chemical reaction

acetyl-[acyl-carrier protein] + malonate $\rightleftharpoons$ malonyl-[acyl-carrier protein] + acetate

This is the first step in the catalysis of malonate decarboxylation.
