= Logone-Birni =

Logone-Birni Logone, Lagone
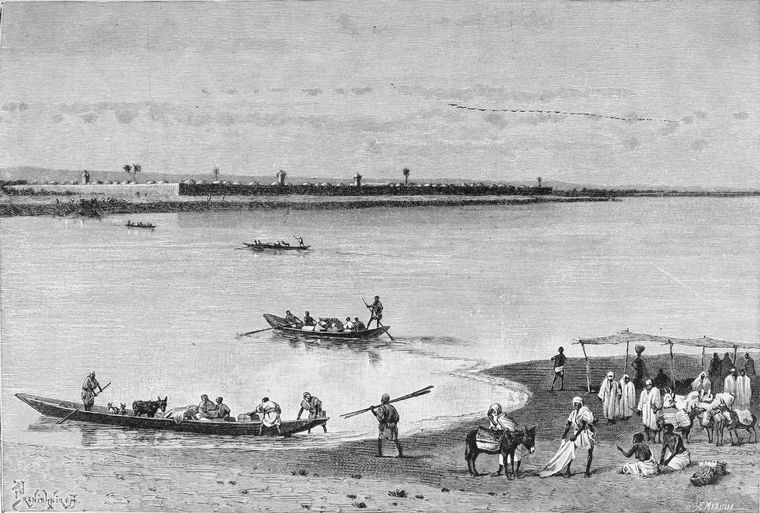
- Logone-Birni, 1892

- Location in Cameroon
- Coordinates: 11°46′50″N 15°06′15″E
- Country: Cameroon
- Province: Far North Province
- Division: Logone-et-Chari

Population
  - Ethnicities: Kotoko
  - Religions: Islam

Logone-Birni is a town and commune in Cameroon. The town lies on the left (west) bank of the Logone River which at this point forms the state boundary between Cameroon and Chad. It is the capital of the Kotoko people, whose two other principal cities are Kousséri and Goulfey. It served as the capital of the Kotoko Kingdom from around the 1570s until 1900.

== History ==
Logone-Birne means Fort Logone and was founded around 1700 by Prince Bruha. Dixon Denham visited Logone on 23 January 1824. He reported:

"I rode down to the river, which here flows with great beauty and majesty past the high walls of this capital of Loggun; it comes direct from the south-west, with a rapid current. We entered the town by the western gate, which leads to the principal street: it is as wide as Pall Mall and has large dwellings on each side, built with great uniformity, each having a courtyard in front, surrounded by a wall, and a handsome entrance, with a strong door hasped with iron: a number of the inhabitants were seated at their doors for the purpose of seeing us enter, with their slaves ranged behind them".

=== Gannibal ===
Logone-Birni has been suggested as the birthplace of Abram Petrovich Gannibal (1696-1781), a General in the Imperial Russian Army and great-grandfather of Alexander Pushkin. This view was first aired by Vladimir Nabokov in 1962, albeit in a dismissive remark. Previously, the predominant view, was that Gannibal was from Ethiopia. As Hugh Barnes suggested this may have arisen from the generic use of the term "Ethiopian" to cover all of Africa. However, in 1996 Dieudonné Gnammankou convincingly argued that Logone-Birni was his birthplace. This view was further elaborated by Hugh Barnes in Gannibal: The Moor of Petersburg (2005).

== Geography ==
=== The Logone Birni Basin ===
Logone-Birni has given its name to the Logone Birni Basin, which covers an area of 27,000 km2 and is part of the West and Central African Rift System.

== See also ==
- Communes of Cameroon
