= Zizilivakan language =

Chadic language of Cameroon and Nigeria

Zizilivakan
- Fali of Jilbu
- Ulan Mazhilvən
- Native to: Cameroon, Nigeria
- Region: Far North Province; Adamawa State
- Native speakers: 6,000 (2010)
- Language family: Afro-Asiatic: Chadic; Biu–Mandara; Bata (A.8); Zizilivakan

Language codes
- ISO 639-3: ziz
- Glottolog: zizi1238
- ELP: Zizilivakan

Zizilivakan (Ziziliveken, Ziliva, Àmzírív), also known as Fali of Jilbu and Ulan Mazhilvən, is a Chadic language spoken in Cameroon in Far North Province and neighboring Nigeria. It is one of several in the area that go by the name Fali.

Zizilivékén is spoken in Cameroon by only a few hundred people (Crozier and Blench 1992), near the border with Nigeria. It is spoken west of Guili (Bourrha commune, Mayo-Tsanaga department, Far North Region). It is also spoken in Nigeria around the town of Jilvu. In Cameroon, it is not spoken as much as in Nigeria.
