= Kirya-Konzəl language =

Chadic language of Nigeria

Kirya-Konzəl
- Fali
- Native to: Nigeria
- Region: Adamawa State
- Native speakers: 5,800 (2011)
- Language family: Afro-Asiatic: Chadic; Biu–Mandara; Bura–Higi; Higi (A.3); Kirya-Konzəl

Language codes
- ISO 639-3: fkk
- Glottolog: kiry1234

Kìryà
- Person: myá Kákíryà
- People: ndá Kákìryà
- Language: Kákìryà

Kónzә̀l
- Person: myá Kónzә̀l
- People: ndá Kónzә̀l
- Language: Kónzә̀l

Kirya-Konzəl is a recently documented Chadic language of Nigeria, though it was first attested in 1931. The varieties, Fali of Kirya (Kirya) and Fali of Mijilu (Konzəl), are very close.
