= Gude language =

Chadic language spoken in West Africa

Gude
- Cheke
- Native to: Nigeria, Cameroon
- Region: Adamawa State, Borno State; Far North Province, North Province
- Native speakers: (90,000 cited 1987–1992)
- Language family: Afro-Asiatic: Chadic; Biu–Mandara; Bata (A.8); Gude

Language codes
- ISO 639-3: gde
- Glottolog: gude1246

Gude is an Afro-Asiatic language spoken in Nigeria in Adamawa State in Mubi South LGA and in Borno State in some parts of Askira-Uba LGA. It is also spoken in neighboring Cameroon. Different dialects are spoken in Nigeria and Cameroon.

Gude is also spoken in the southern part of Bourrha commune (Mayo-Tsanaga department, Far North Region) and the western end of Mayo-Oulo district (Mayo-Louti department, North Region). It is spoken by about 28,000 people.
