= Goulfey =

Coordinates: 12°23′N 14°56′E

- Commune and town
- Interactive map of Goulfey
- Country: Cameroon
- Time zone: UTC+1 (WAT)

Goulfey is a town and commune in the Logone-et-Chari department of Cameroon, close to the border of Chad.

== Geography ==
Goulfey is located about 50 kilometres north of Kousséri and is separated by the Logone River.

== History ==
Street in Goulfey in 1911

Kotoko musicians in Goulfey

Goulfey started of as a city state from around 1000 until the 1570s when it was absorbed into the Kotoko Kingdom.

The Arabs found people embedded in ancestral traditions, locally known as the cult of the lizard god Varan, which was considered the symbol of Goulfey and a spiritual element of protection and divination. It plays an important political and religious role in the community. It was often believed that the spirits were known as the Gbwéi-gbwéi, who collaborated with the people through the traditional priest to offer household food, such as honey and milk to the Varans, housed in the tower.

Sketch of the Goto-Goulfey tower

During the 1500s, a 12-metre tall by 9 metre wide cubic clay tower called the Goto-Goulfey was constructed as a religious and defensive structure, it is coated in vermiculite to protect it from erosion. The tower has received UNESCO status and is now a museum.

The famous military leader Rabih az-Zubayr, who came from Sudan conquered the Kotoko Kingdom in an aim to convert locals to Islam and to take slaves. In the colonial era the town's leader Rabat defended the town with the help of the French against Arab incursions.

== Tourism ==
Goulfey is a centuries-old dwelling. It has a museum and acts as a cultural centre where young people visit to learn about the rich culture of Kotoko, the museum contains old weapons used by the Kotoko.

== See also ==
- Communes of Cameroon
