= Tokombéré =

Coordinates: 10°52′N 14°09′E

- Commune and town
- Interactive map of Tokombéré
- Country: Cameroon
- Region: Extreme North
- Department: Mayo-Sava

Population (2005)
  - Total: 91,256
- Time zone: UTC+1 (WAT)

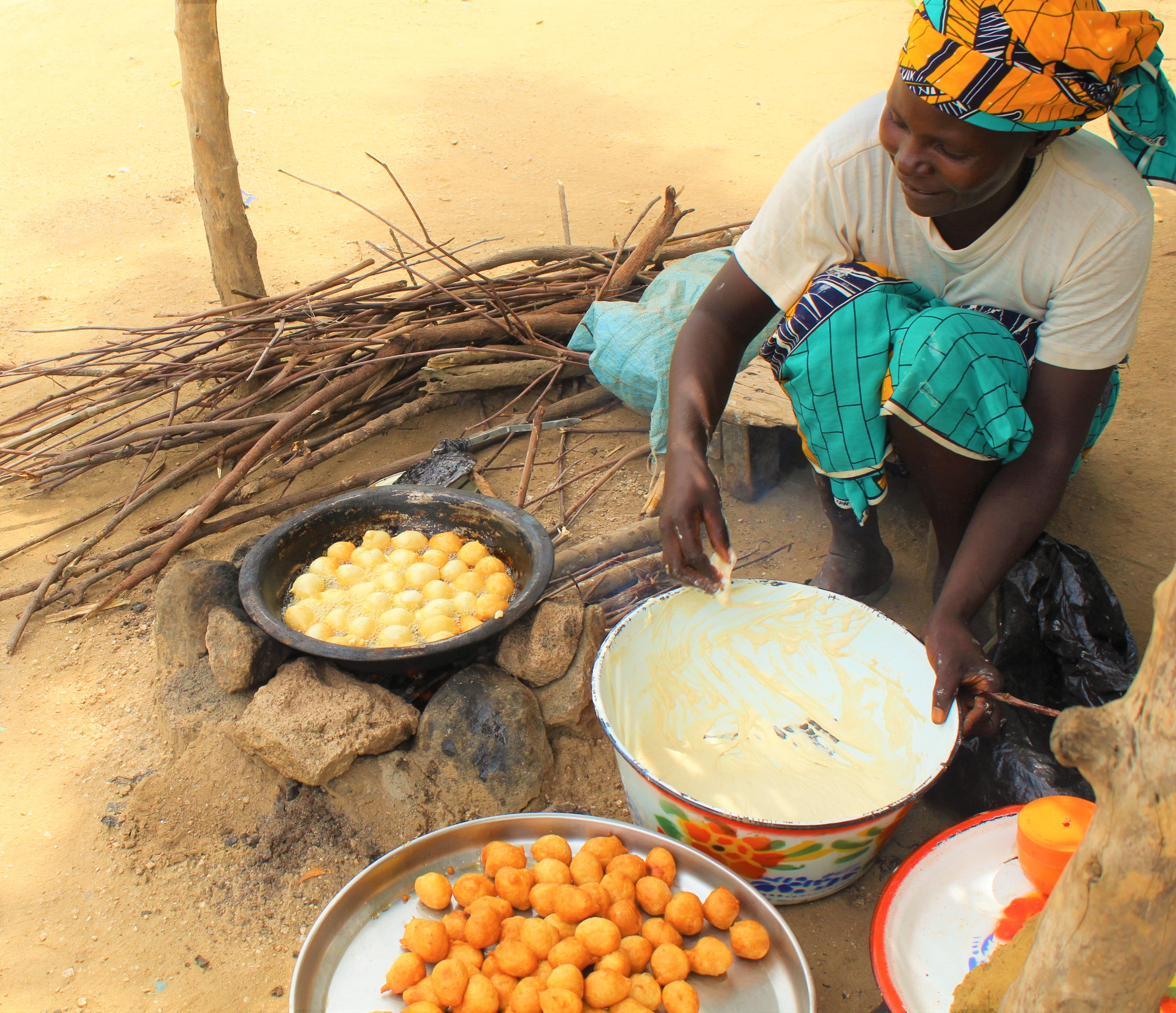
A woman preparing doughnuts

Tokombéré is a town and commune in Cameroon. The town has approximately 10,000 inhabitants and the commune approximately 80,000. Surrounded by rocky hills, Tokombéré is a crossroads for multiple ethnic groups, including the Mada, Muyang, and Zulgo tribes. The town's religious makeup is nearly equal among Christians, Muslims, and animists. The town's development began in large part with the arrival of a priest from southern Cameroon, Baba Simon, in 1959. The Catholic mission remains an important and central location in Tokombéré, with its hospital, high school, elementary school, women's center, youth center, farmer's center, and more.

== See also ==
- Communes of Cameroon

== Notes ==
- Site de la primature - Élections municipales 2002 (in French)
- Contrôle de gestion et performance des services publics communaux des villes camerounaises - Thèse de Donation Avele, Université Montesquieu Bordeaux IV (in French)
- Charles Nanga, La réforme de l’administration territoriale au Cameroun à la lumière de la loi constitutionnelle n° 96/06 du 18 janvier 1996, Mémoire ENA. (in French)
