= Mayo-Sava =

- Department
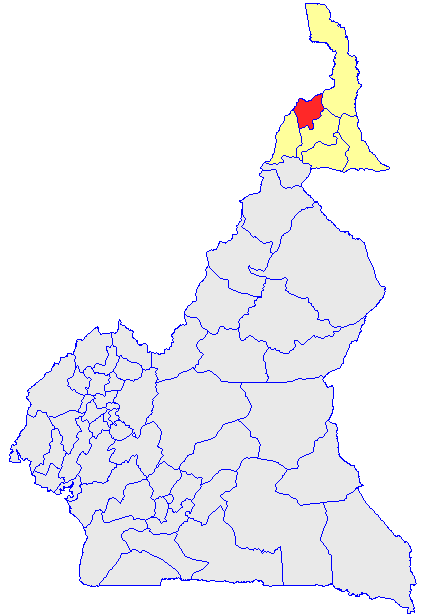
- Department location in Cameroon

- Location within Cameroon Location within Africa
- Coordinates: 11.0733°N 14.1726°E
- Country: Cameroon
- Province: Extreme-Nord Province
- Capital: Mora

Area
  - Total: 1,056 sq mi (2,736 km^{2})

Population (2005)
  - Total: 348,890
- Time zone: UTC+1 (WAT)

Mayo-Sava is a department of Extreme-Nord Province in Cameroon. The department covers an area of 2,736 km^{2} and at the 2005 Census had a total population of 348,890. The capital of the department is at Mora.

== Subdivisions ==
The department is divided administratively into 3 communes and in turn into villages.

=== Communes ===
- Kolofata
- Mora
- Tokombéré
