= Second Battle of Amchidé =

- Part of Boko Haram insurgency
Date	December 17, 2014
Location	Amchidé, Far North Region, Cameroon
Result	Cameroonian victory

Belligerents
Cameroon	Boko Haram

Units involved
Rapid Intervention Brigade	Unknown

Strength
Unknown	1,000-3,000 fighters

Casualties and losses
3 killed 6 injured	116-180+ killed

On December 17, 2014, militants from Boko Haram attacked the town of Amchide, Far North Region, Cameroon, for the second time in two months. Cameroonian forces repulsed the attack, killing at least 116 militants.

== Background ==
Boko Haram emerged in 2009 as a jihadist social and political movement in a failed rebellion in northeast Nigeria. Throughout the following years, Abubakar Shekau unified militant Islamist groups in the region and continued to foment the rebellion against the Nigerian government, conducting terrorist attacks and bombings in cities and communities across the region.

Throughout 2014, Boko Haram launched incursions into northern Cameroonian territory, with attacks on Gorsi Tourou and other areas. Cameroonian forces and Boko Haram clashed near Fotokol for the first time in a brief skirmish on March 2, 2014. In August 2014, Boko Haram launched an offensive in eastern Borno State, Nigeria, attacking and seizing the towns of Damboa, Gwoza, and Gamboru Ngala. In these towns, Boko Haram slaughtered over 1,000 civilians alleged to be cooperating with the Nigerian government or not following Boko Haram's strict interpretation of Islam. During the offensive in September, Boko Haram attempted to seize the Cameroonian town of Fotokol for a month, but failed.

Amchide is located on the Cameroonian side of the border, separated from the Nigerian town of Banki by a river. At the time of the attack on December 17, there was a Cameroonian military camp in the town. On October 15 2014, Boko Haram captured the town of Amchide and massacred civilians there before attacking a Cameroonian outpost in Limani. Cameroonian forces recaptured Amchide after several hours under Boko Haram control. The militants again tried to attack Amchide from Nigerian territory on October 24, but were repulsed. Most residents fled after the October attacks, and the Cameroonian military assumed control of the town and began fortifying it.

== Battle ==
At about 10:20am on December 17, Boko Haram fighters crossed the river from the Nigerian town of Banki, under their control, to attack Amchide. Fighting began when a column consisting of a military engineer's truck and three pickups from the Rapid Intervention Brigade (BIR) was ambushed by an IED. At the same time, hundreds of jihadists launched an assault on the Cameroonian military camp. Cameroonian sources estimated 1,000 fighters took part in the attack. The fighters were repelled after one to two hours of fighting.

The Cameroonian Ministry of Defense stated that 116 fighters were killed in the battle, excluding any losses from "undetermined damage on Nigerian territory" due to artillery fire. Xinhua News Agency said that at least 180 fighters were killed, of the 3,000 that took part in the attack. Cameroonian authorities announced that one soldier was killed and one was missing. Material losses on the Cameroonian side were three trucks. Cameroonian newspaper L'Oeil later added that the missing officer was killed, and that six other soldiers were wounded. Xinhua mentioned three soldiers being killed in the attack.

== Aftermath ==
After the attack, remaining fighters of Boko Haram retreated to Nigerian territory. On December 18, they killed 33 people including women and children in the village of Bintiri, and kidnapped 100 others.
