= South Giziga language =

Afro-Asiatic language spoken in Cameroon

South Giziga
- Native to: Cameroon
- Region: Far North Province
- Native speakers: (60,000 cited 1991)
- Language family: Afro-Asiatic: Chadic; Biu–Mandara; Wandala–Mafa; Mafa (A.5); South (c); South Giziga

Language codes
- ISO 639-3: giz
- Glottolog: sout3051

South Giziga is an Afro-Asiatic language spoken in northern Cameroon. Dialects are Mi Mijivin, Muturami, and Rum.

South Giziga (60,000 speakers) is spoken south of Maroua in the Diamaré plain around the small massifs of Loutou, Moutourwa, Midjivin, etc. (in Diamaré department, Maroua commune and Mayo-Kani department, communes of Mindif, Kaélé, and Moutourwa).
