= Battles of Amchidé and Limani =

- Part of Boko Haram insurgency
Date	October 15-16, 2014
Location	Amchide and Limani, Far North Region, Cameroon
Result	Cameroonian victory: Boko Haram fighters repulsed from Cameroon
Territorial changes	Boko Haram seizes Amchide for several hours

Belligerents
Cameroon	Boko Haram

Strength
250	1,000; 3 tanks

Casualties and losses
8 killed, 7 injured (per Cameroon)	107 killed (per Cameroon)
- 30-86 civilians killed 100+ civilians killed (per Amnesty International)

Between October 15 and 16, 2014, Boko Haram militants attacked the border towns of Amchide and Limani, Far North Region, Cameroon. Between 30 and 86 civilians were killed during the attacks, and at least 100 militants were killed during the Cameroonian army's repulsion of the assault.

== Background ==
Boko Haram emerged in 2009 as a jihadist social and political movement in a failed rebellion in northeast Nigeria. Throughout the following years, Abubakar Shekau unified militant Islamist groups in the region and continued to foment the rebellion against the Nigerian government, conducting terrorist attacks and bombings in cities and communities across the region.

Throughout 2014, Boko Haram launched incursions into northern Cameroonian territory, with attacks on Gorsi Tourou and other areas. Cameroonian forces and Boko Haram clashed near Fotokol for the first time in a brief skirmish on March 2, 2014. Around thirty jihadists were spotted by a villager, who alerted Cameroonian authorities. Cameroonian forces then dispatched troops to counter the jihadists, including soldiers from the elite Rapid Intervention Battalion (BIR). Seeing the road to Fotokol blocked, the jihadists opened fire, with the fighting killing one soldier and six jihadists.

In August 2014, Boko Haram launched an offensive in eastern Borno State, Nigeria, attacking and seizing the towns of Damboa, Gwoza, and Gamboru Ngala. In these towns, Boko Haram slaughtered over 1,000 civilians alleged to be cooperating with the Nigerian government or not following Boko Haram's strict interpretation of Islam. During the offensive in September, Boko Haram attempted to seize the Cameroonian town of Fotokol for a month, but failed.

== Battles ==
Around 5pm on October 15, Boko Haram militants launched two simultaneous incursions into the Cameroonian towns of Amchide and Limani, near the Nigerian town of Banki, which was under Boko Haram control. Prior to the attacks, the militants had sent a false informant to deceive Cameroonian authorities into believing the attacks would be launched against another town. The attacks also occurred during the second half of the football match between Cameroon and Sierra Leone.

The militants seized control of Amchide and held it for several hours. At least 30 civilians were killed during the group's occupation of Amchide, and a Catholic church, a Protestant church, a mosque, and almost every bar was torched. Boko Haram entered the market in Amchide dressed as civilians, slaughtering everyone they saw. One witness said that the fighters ransacked stores and ATMs, demanding money and killing civilians if they didn't have enough money. The fighters shouted that they were going to murder all Christians.

The militants then moved to capture a BIR camp. The camp was defended by 250 soldiers, facing a Boko Haram army of several hundred men and three tanks. Amnesty International later assessed that 1,000 fighters took part in the attack. The attack against the camp began with a Peugeot 504 suicide car bomber, but the car was destroyed by the soldiers before it could detonate. Cameroonian soldiers destroyed a pickup truck and an armored vehicle that the militants had previously captured from the 211th Armored Battalion of the Nigerian Army. Boko Haram indiscriminately shelled and shot at around 200 fleeing civilians trying to cross into the base for safety.

After the destruction of their initial force, Boko Haram shelled Cameroonian soldiers. According to the Cameroonian government, the fighting was "exceptionally violent." Fighting lasted for two hours and ceased in the evening, but returned at dawn. By the late morning of October 16, the militants fled across to Nigeria and were pursued by Cameroonian troops.

Casualties

The Cameroonian government reported eight soldiers killed and seven wounded, alongside 107 militants killed. Around 30 civilians were killed during the occupation of Amchide, with some being decapitated. The official civilian death toll is 86. One witness told Amnesty International that at least 100 civilians were killed.

== Aftermath ==
On the afternoon of October 24, Boko Haram militants entered several areas of Cameroonian territory, including Fotokol, Amchide, and Kolofata. These incursions were intercepted by Cameroonian soldiers and at least 27 militants were killed.
