= Battle of Kolofata (2015) =

Failed assault by Boko Haram on a Cameroonian military base

Coordinates: 11.1622°N 14.0114°E

- Part of the Boko Haram insurgency
Date	12 January 2015
Location	Kolofata, Far North Region, Cameroon
Result	Cameroonian victory

Belligerents
Cameroon	Boko Haram

Commanders and leaders
Ibrahim Njankouo	Unknown

Strength
Unknown	300+

Casualties and losses
1 killed 4-7 injured Unknown number kidnapped	143-146 killed

On 12 January 2015, militants from Boko Haram attacked a Cameroonian military base in Kolofata, Far North Region, Cameroon. The raid was unsuccessful, and over 100 Boko Haram fighters were killed.

== Background ==
Boko Haram emerged in 2009 as a jihadist social and political movement in a failed rebellion in northeast Nigeria. Throughout the following years, Abubakar Shekau unified militant Islamist groups in the region and continued to foment the rebellion against the Nigerian government, conducting terrorist attacks and bombings in cities and communities across the region.

In late 2014, Boko Haram was continuing an offensive into Cameroonian territory from Nigeria. On 18 December, Boko Haram attacked and briefly seized the city of Amchide, in Mayo-Tsanaga. The attack was repelled, and hundreds of militants were killed. Similar attacks occurred on 28 December, in various communities around Achigachia.

== Battle ==
Prior to the battle, the military base at the Cameroonian border town of Kolofata was defended by a ditch and a manmade hill. Soldiers from the Rapid Intervention Brigade (BIR) were deployed to Kolofata.

Around 6:30am local time, the jihadists took advantage of a thick fog to cross the Cameroonian border and surprise the defending troops. The surprise did not work, and the Cameroonians were alerted to the attack. Several residents fled upon hearing news of the incursion. Fighting took place at the military base and in strategic locations in Kolofata. The camp was the most targeted location, and several Boko Haram fighters entered the compound before they were shot dead. The garrison commander, Ibrahim Njankouo, used heavy artillery to push the jihadists back into Nigeria.

== Aftermath ==
On the evening of 12 January, the Cameroonian government reported 143 "terrorists" killed, as well as one Cameroonian soldier killed and four wounded. AFP said that no independent death toll could be established. This initial estimate was probably inaccurate. Njankouo told Jeune Afrique in February "Sometimes using binoculars we count those who were kidnapped to the insurgents' camp." He also affirmed a death toll of 146 fighters killed, one Cameroonian soldier killed, and seven wounded. One Boko Haram "general" was killed by a sniper during the battle.

Among the Boko Haram dead were several light-skinned fighters alleged to be Tuaregs. Njankouo said that Nigerien Tuaregs, Sudanese, and Libyans were among the Boko Haram corpses.
