= December 2014 Mayo-Tsanaga attacks =

Boko Haram attacks in northern Cameroon

Coordinates: 11.1364°N 13.8817°E

- Part of Boko Haram insurgency
Date	28 December 2014
Location	Achigachia, Guirvidig, Mokolo, Waza, Amchide, Makary, Mayo-Tsanaga Department, Far North Region, Cameroon
Result	Tactical Boko Haram victory, strategic Cameroonian victory: Boko Haram seizes Achigachia and several towns, eventually repulsed

Belligerents
Cameroon	Boko Haram

Strength
Unknown	1,000

Casualties and losses
12 killed	124+ killed
- 30-88 civilians killed

On 28 December 2014, militants from Boko Haram attacked several localities in the Mayo-Tsanaga department of Far North Region, Cameroon, eventually being repulsed by Cameroonian forces.

== Background ==
Boko Haram emerged in 2009 as a jihadist social and political movement in a failed rebellion in northeast Nigeria. Throughout the following years, Abubakar Shekau unified militant Islamist groups in the region and continued to foment the rebellion against the Nigerian government, conducting bombings and other terrorist attacks in cities and communities across the region.

Throughout 2014, Boko Haram launched incursions into northern Cameroonian territory, with attacks on Gorsi Tourou and other areas. Cameroonian forces and Boko Haram clashed near Fotokol for the first time in a brief skirmish on 2 March 2014. In August 2014, Boko Haram launched an offensive in eastern Borno State, Nigeria, attacking and seizing the towns of Damboa, Gwoza, and Gamboru Ngala. In these towns, Boko Haram slaughtered over 1,000 civilians alleged to be cooperating with the Nigerian government or not following Boko Haram's strict interpretation of Islam. During the offensive in September, Boko Haram attempted to seize the Cameroonian town of Fotokol for a month, but failed.

Ten days before the offensive, Boko Haram attacked and briefly seized the city of Amchide, in Mayo-Tsanaga. The attack was repelled, and hundreds of militants were killed.

== Battles ==
On 28 December 2014, Boko Haram attacked five towns and a military base in Mayo-Tsanaga department. The towns attacked were Guirvidig, Mokolo, Waza, Amchide, and Makary, along with the Cameroonian military base at Achigachia. Achigachia lies on the Cameroon-Nigeria border, and is separated from Nigeria by a dry riverbed with a military base located on either side. The military base on the Cameroonian side is controlled by the Cameroonian government, and the base on the Nigerian side is controlled by Boko Haram.

Around 1,000 jihadists took part in the offensive. The Achigachia camp was attacked at 4am. The soldiers of the motorized infantry regiment stationed at the base fled, allowing Boko Haram to seize control of it. Boko Haram remained in control of Achigachia for four hours, seizing equipment and weapons. For the first time during the insurgency, Cameroon deployed its Air Force, dispatching two Alpha jets that bombed the camp and forced the fighters to retreat to Nigeria.

In their attacks on civilian towns, Boko Haram quickly captured the cities and began conducting attacks on civilians. Many civilians fled the Boko Haram onslaught. However, in the Cameroonian army's recapture of the towns, evidence began to surface of government executions of civilians. Between 1 and 8 January 2015, the Cameroonian army launched an operation to reclaim the bodies of slain soldiers from the 28 December attacks. During this operation, a video emerged of ten bullet-riddled bodies massacred by Cameroonian soldiers, and authenticated by France 24. Survivors stated that between 30 and 88 civilians were killed during the attacks, including many elderly who were unable to flee.

== Casualties ==
Cameroonian Minister of Communications, Issa Tchiroma, said on 29 December that 34 jihadists were killed in Chogori, seven in Waza, and one Cameroonian soldier killed in Waza. Xinhua News Agency, citing Cameroonian military sources, said that 83 attackers were killed in Achigachia, alongside three Cameroonian soldiers killed and ten missing.

The following day, Radio France Internationale reported that eight Cameroonian soldiers were missing and presumed dead. On 29 December, a vehicle struck an IED between Amchide and Kolofata, killing two soldiers.
