= Mayo-Kani =

- Department
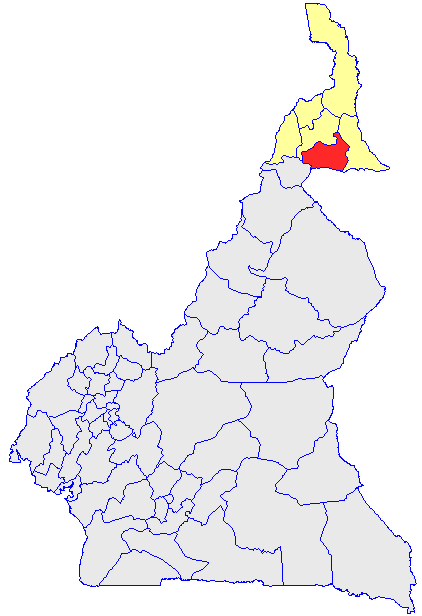
- Department location in Cameroon

- Location within Cameroon Location within Africa
- Coordinates: 10.2727°N 14.5361°E
- Country: Cameroon
- Province: Extreme-Nord Province
- Capital: Kaélé

Area
  - Total: 1,943 sq mi (5,033 km^{2})

Population (2005)
  - Total: 404,646
- Time zone: UTC+1 (WAT)

Mayo-Kani is a department of Extreme-Nord Province in Cameroon. The department covers an area of 5,033 km^{2} and at the 2005 Census had a total population of 404,646. The capital of the department is at Kaélé.

== Subdivisions ==
The department is divided administratively into seven communes, which are in turn divided into villages.

=== Communes ===
- Dziguilao
- Guidiguis
- Kaélé
- Mindif
- Moulvoudaye
- Moutourwa
- Touloum
