= Guirvidig =

Guirvidig Gerwidig, Girwidig, Gouirwidig, Guirwidig
- Location in Cameroon
- Coordinates: 10.8833°N 14.8339°E
- Country: Cameroon
- Region: Far North
- Department: Mayo-Danay

Guirvidig is a town in the Mayo-Danay Department of the Far North Region of Cameroon.

A dialect of the Muskum language, Muzuk (Mousgoum de Guirvidig), is spoken in the town.

In 2014, Guirvidig was the site of fighting between Boko Haram and the Cameroonian military, in which a Boko Haram training camp was destroyed.

On 28 December 2014, Cameroonian troops repelled simultaneous Boko Haram raids into the towns of Guirvidig, Amchide, Makari, Limani, Waza and Achigachia, all located in Cameroon's Far North Region.

== See also ==
- Mayo-Danay
- December 2014 Cameroon clashes
- Communes of Cameroon
