= Gorsi Tourou attack =

- Part of Boko Haram insurgency
| Date | June 6–7, 2014 |
| Location | Gorsi Tourou, Far North Region, Cameroon |
| Result | Indecisive: Boko Haram remains near Tourou |

Belligerents
| Cameroon | Boko Haram |

Strength
| Unknown | ~300 |

Casualties and losses
| 1-2 soldiers killed | 118 killed |
- 1-8+ civilians killed Thousands displaced

Between June 6–7, 2014, Cameroonian forces attacked Boko Haram militants at their base in Mount Gossi, Gorsi Tourou, Far North Region, Cameroon, killing at least 118 militants. The battle began shortly after the jihadists attacked the town of Tourou, slaughtering many people.

== Background ==
Boko Haram emerged in 2009 as a jihadist social and political movement in a failed rebellion in northeast Nigeria. Throughout the following years, Abubakar Shekau unified militant Islamist groups in the region and continued to foment the rebellion against the Nigerian government, conducting terrorist attacks and bombings in cities and communities across the region. Since the start of 2014, the group had carried out 40 attacks leaving 700 people dead.

The group, since 2011, has expanded into the Lake Chad basin in Cameroon and Chad, with the first attacks in Cameroonian territory beginning in March 2014. The jihadists targeted the Far North Region, a historically impoverished and neglected region. In late May, the Cameroonian government deployed 3,000 troops to the far north to protect against Boko Haram incursions. On May 28, the Cameroonian government repelled two Boko Haram attacks in Achigachia and Amchide. Renewed fighting broke out in Limani the next day. On June 1, Cameroonian authorities reported that forty Boko Haram militants were killed in Kousséri.

== Battle ==
On the evening of June 6, 2014, a group of 200 Boko Haram fighters established a base on Mount Gossi, near Gorsi Tourou, a town near Mokolo. Residents of Gorsi Tourou said that the militants were able to monitor the movements of Cameroonian forces from the tops of the hills. At 5:00pm on June 6 during a heavy downpour, around 300 militants attacked the town of Gorsi Tourou, burning down houses and killing an unknown number of civilians. Cameroonian soldiers from the elite Rapid Intervention Battalion (BIR) attacked the militants, with Cameroonian authorities later saying 118 militants were killed along with two soldiers. Cameroonian Ministry of Defense spokesman Issa Tchiroma said that one soldier and one civilian was killed. Local churches contacted by the Cameroon Concord said that eight of their members were killed during the attack. Villagers buried the bodies of seven Boko Haram militants, and the surviving jihadists took more bodies with them. Moussa Sambo, the village chief of Gorsi Tourou, told Voice of America that Cameroonian soldiers were unable to reach the tops of the hills where the militants were positioned. While Cameroonian authorities said that the remaining militants fled to Nigeria, Sambo said that many were still present.

Many villagers from Gorsi Tourou fled to Maroua.
