= Tikela Kemone =

- Born: 1950 (age 75–76)
- Occupation: Politician

Tikela Kemone (born 1950) is a Cameroonian politician. He was Deputy Minister of Finance and Secretary of State for Finance during the 1980s; currently he is a Technical Adviser at the Presidency of the Republic, heading the Internal Affairs Department.

== Life and career ==
Born in Kaélé, Tikela Kemone worked as a teacher in the late 1970s and was then appointed to administrative positions in government ministries. From October 1980 to October 1981, he headed the General Affairs and Legislation Department under the Ministry of National Education's Department of Primary and Nursery Education. He was then moved to the Ministry of Finance, where he worked from October 1981 to November 1982 as Sub-Director of Inventory Accounting and then as Deputy Director of Account Balancing from November 1982 to August 1983.

After that succession of ministry jobs, Kemone left Yaoundé and headed a school in Kaélé from 22 August 1983 until he was appointed to the government as Deputy Minister of Finance on 7 July 1984. He spent a little more than a year in the latter position before being appointed as Secretary of State for Finance on 24 August 1985. Later, on 16 May 1988, he was instead appointed as Secretary of State for Agriculture.

An insufficient level of rainfall in 1990 led Kemone to warn of potential food shortages that could affect 600,000 people in Far North Province. He remained in the government until 1992 and was subsequently an Adviser at the Presidency. He served as Technical Adviser heading the Presidency's Special Affairs Department for a time and currently heads the Internal Affairs Department.

== See also ==
- Politics of Cameroon
