= 2008 Kousseri vaccination campaign =

Childhood vaccination campaign in Cameroon

The Kousseri vaccination campaign took place between February 13 and 17 2008. During the campaign over 35,000 infants and children were vaccinated against measles, poliomyelitis or both in Cameroon's north-eastern district of Kousséri, in an operation led by the Cameroon Ministry of Health, the United Nations, and non-governmental organizations (NGOs), such as Médecins Sans Frontières – Switzerland (MSF-CH).

The UN Resident Coordinator, Sophie de Caen, stated that this was in response to the influx of Chadian refugees into the northeast Cameroon earlier in February 2008, in the aftermath of the Battle of N'Djamena, as the potential for epidemics substantially increases whenever there are population movements.

Following fighting in the Chadian capital N'Djamena, which erupted on February 2, at least 30,000 Chadians crossed into Cameroon, reaching Kousséri in northeast Cameroon. Most found refuge in two temporary sites, while many others were hosted in schools, churches, and private homes, according to the United Nations.

The vaccination campaign targeted all children of applicable ages in Kousséri, ensuring protection for Cameroonian and refugee children alike. All children aged six months to 15 years were vaccinated against measles, and all children under 5, including newborns, were vaccinated against poliomyelitis.

Figures released on 21 February 2008 show that a total of 35,615 children were vaccinated against poliomyelitis, while 32,624 were vaccinated against measles. Vitamin A supplement tablets were also provided to approximately 34,000 children along with the vaccinations.
