= Mindif =

- Commune and town
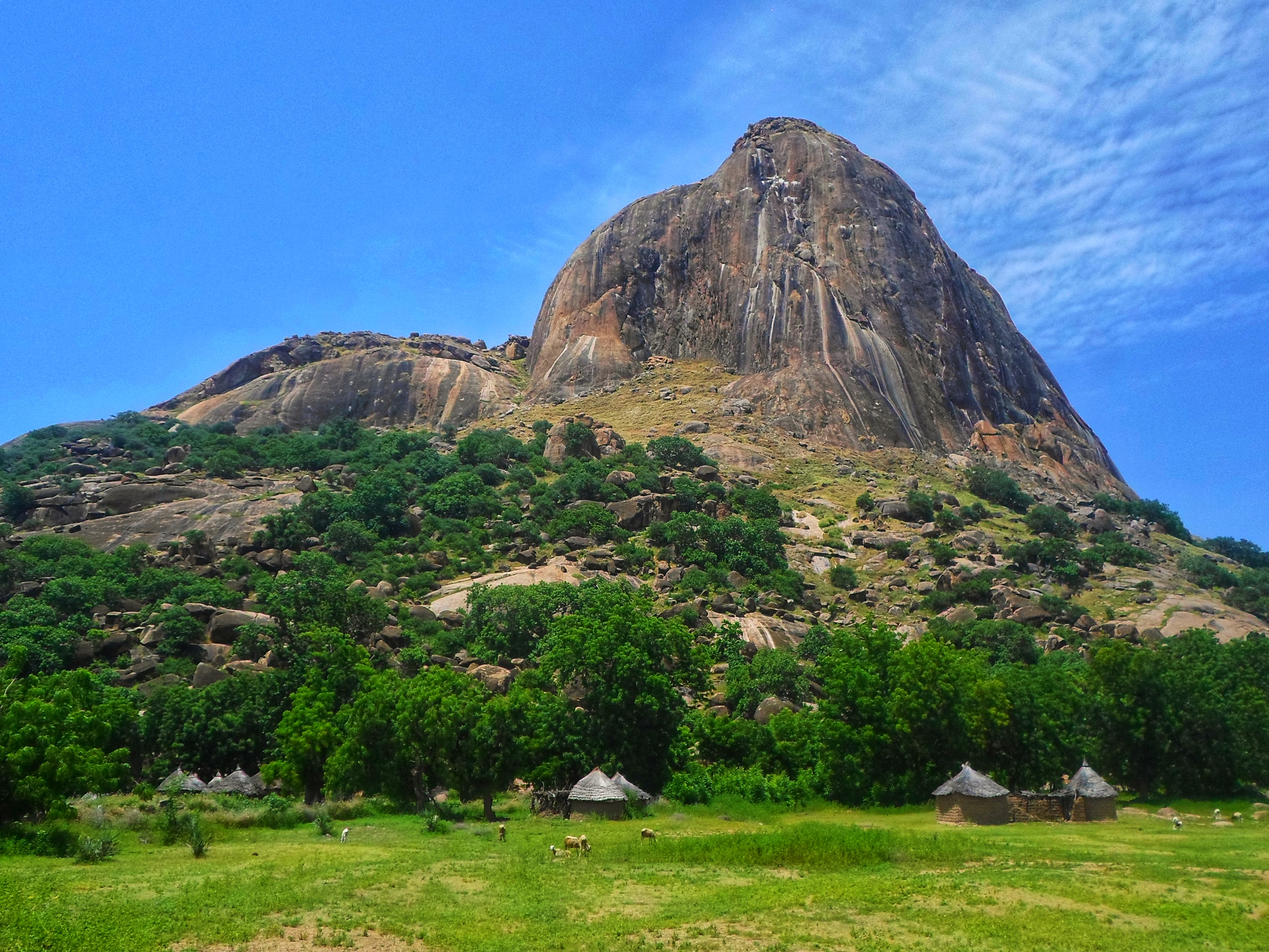
- Pic de Mindif

- Location in Cameroon
- Coordinates: 10°24′N 14°26′E
- Country: Cameroon
- Region: Far North Region
- Department: Mayo-Kani
- Time zone: UTC+1 (WAT)

Mindif is a town and commune in Cameroon.

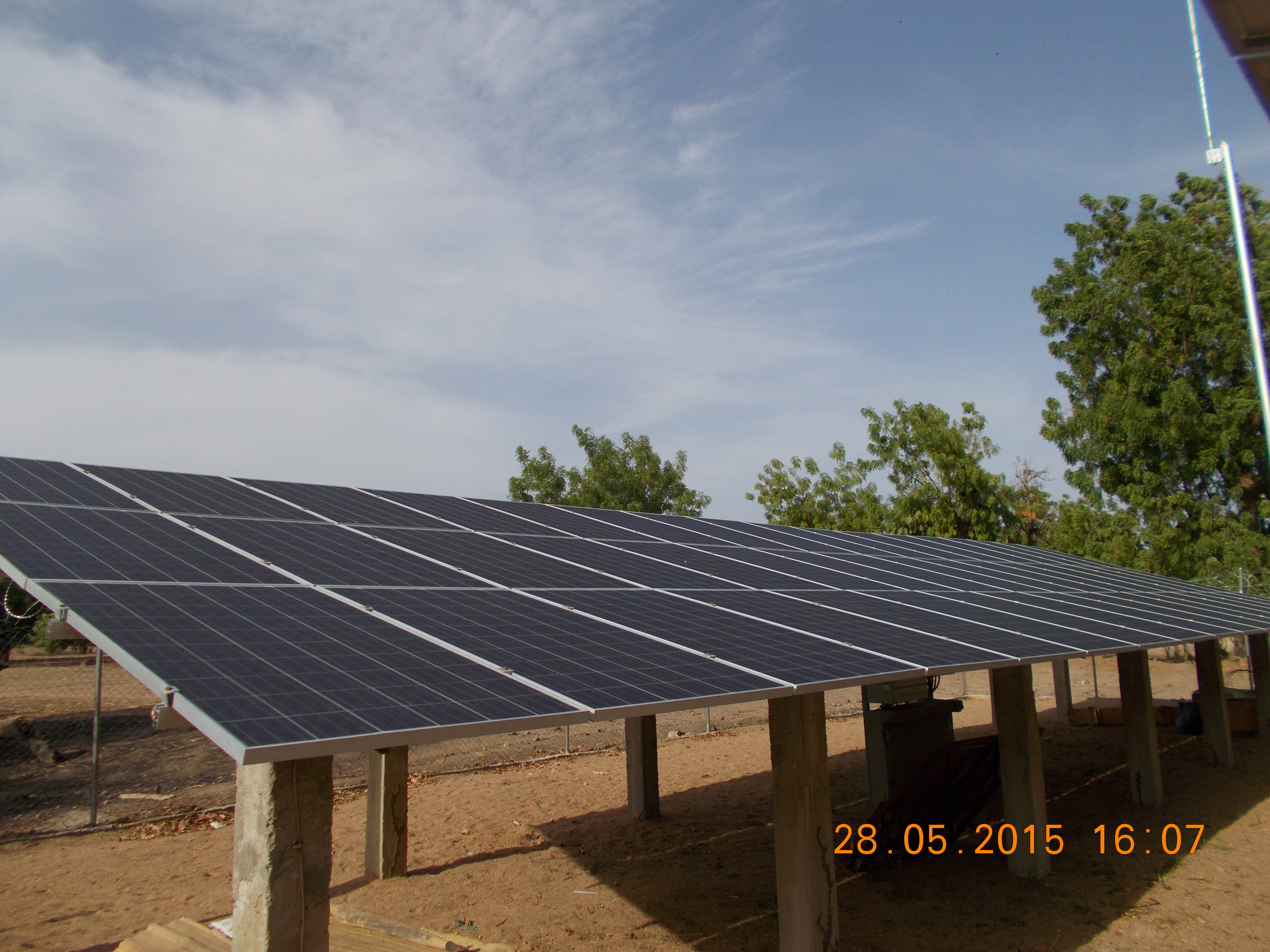
Solar panels in Mindif

It is known for the Mindif Peaks located nearby. The 1988 film Chocolat was filmed in the area.

== See also ==
- Communes of Cameroon
