= Limani =

- Location in Cameroon
- Coordinates: 11.2392°N 14.1597°E
- Country: Cameroon
- Region: Far North

Limani is a town in the Far North Region of Cameroon, on the border with Nigeria.

In 2014, the town was caught up in the Boko Haram conflict. In October 2014, Boko Haram fighters entered Limani and Amchide, another border town, killing at least 30 civilians. The Cameroonian Army reported 107 Boko Haram members were killed in the fighting that ensued. On 28 December 2014, Cameroonian troops repelled simultaneous Boko Haram raids into the towns of Limani, Amchide, Makari, Guirvidig, Waza and Achigachia, all located in Cameroon's Far North region.

== See also ==
- December 2014 Cameroon clashes
