= Kotoko Kingdom =

Historical African kingdom

- 1570?–1900
- Map showing the two confederations, the vassal of Bornu is labelled 'Kotoko' whilst the independent Kotoko kingdom is labelled 'Logone'
- Capital: Logone-Birni (c. 1570s?–1900)
- Other languages: Kotoko/Lagwan
- Government: Monarchy
- History
  - Established: 1570?
  - Disestablished: 1900

Area
  - Total: 8,000 km^{2} (3,100 sq mi)

Population
  - 1870 estimate: 250,000
- Currency: Metal currency
- Today part of: Cameroon, Chad and Nigeria

The Kotoko Kingdom was a monarchy (originally starting as multiple independent kingdoms) in what is today northern Cameroon and Nigeria, and southwestern Chad, dating from around the 1000s until the early 1900s. Its inhabitants and their modern descendants are known as the Kotoko people.

== History ==
=== Early history and foundation ===
Kotoko bronze horseman

The rise of the Kotoko coincided with the decline of the Sao civilisation in northern Cameroon. The Kotoko Kingdom began as regional Kotoko city states, such as Houlouf (Alph), which was a powerful city state ruled by a Mra (Sultan); Holouf had large 16-hectare ramparts, extensive city walls were built surrounding the city to defend against the arising 'warrior horsemen' class, a large palace and a royal cemetery. The Mra of Houlouf headed a diverse political system of administrators and tribute collectors (galadima), military leaders for horsemen and archers, and religious leaders. Houlouf was likely the 'Quamaco/Quamoco', mentioned by Giovanni Lorenzo d'Anania who said that:

...at Quamaco, there is a great traffic of iron that is carried from Mandrà [Mandara]

Mandara being a southern kingdom and part of the Saharan trade. Houlouf had six quarters with different gates named after rulers of the kingdom. During the early Kotoko period (1000–1570?) there were over 20 Kotoko city states including Logone-Birni, Waza, Zgague, Djilbe, Tilde, Kala-Kafra, Kabe, Goulfey, Makari, Afade, Maltam, Kusseri, Sao, Woulki, Midigué, Tago, Gawi, Amkoundjo and Messo. The biggest of these states (including Goulfey, Logone and Makari) were mentioned by Bornu scholar Ibn Furtu and Lorenzo d'Anania. During this period many defensive buildings were built, most notable being the tower of Goto-Goulfey, a 12-metre high defensive and religious tower in Goulfey.

=== The two confederations and Kotoko kingdom ===
Musicians in Goulfey

During the reign of Mai Idris Alooma (c. 1570–1603), the armies of Kanem-Bornu invaded the northern Kotoko city states, capturing the king of Kusseri, turning it into a vassal state. Due to Bornu's expansion two main confederations formed, the Northern Kotoko Confederation headed by the ruler of Makari, and the Southern Kotoko Confederation headed by the ruler of Logone. The northern confederation-kingdom was under the suzerainty of Bornu, leaving the southern confederation-kingdom as the main independent Kotoko state, founding the Kotoko kingdom, called Katakuwā by Bornu scholars. Houlouf became a near autonomous vassal via diplomatic relations to Logone. Pre-existing rulers became part of the Kingdom's administration, ruling the provinces that made up the kingdom, whilst the Mra Zina headed the military. A king (Mra) headed the nascent Southern state, which came to assimilate several smaller kingdoms. Among these were the other Kotoko city states of Kousséri, Makari, and Mara.

Tradition Kotoko house

The Kingdom was visited by Major Denham in 1824 and later Heinrich Barth in 1852. Denham described the typical Kotoko walled cities of Houlouf and Kusseri, ruled by individual sultans, part of the larger Kotoko kingdom. Denham also described Logone as the capital with a population of 15,000 Kotoko speakers and countless subordinate Shuwa Arabic speaking residents surrounding. The Kotoko kingdom was neutral during the wars between Bornu and Bagirmi. By 1830, Logone became a vassal of Kanem-Bornu, paying tribute of 100 tobes and 10 captives, by the 1870s, Kotoko was described as a regional power. Explorer Gustav Nachitgal described the cities, stating that Kala Kafra had 6000 people, Houlouf having 7,000 people and Logone having 12-15,000, with Sultan Ma'aruf ruling over the kingdom, being a vassal of Sheikh Omar I of Bornu along with Makari, whilst Goulfey, Kusseri and Wulki sided with opposing Sheikh 'Abd ar-Rahman. The entire kingdom covered 8000sqkm and contained 250,000 people. Nachitgal stated that the inhabitants of Logone:

....devote themselves diligently to farming, fishing and industry"

=== Collapse ===
The Kanem Empire had brought northern Kotoko into its sphere of influence early on. Through the actions of missionaries and conquerors, most of northern Kotoko had converted to Islam by the 19th century. That same century, Kotoko itself was completely subsumed into the Bornu Empire, and Islam continued to spread. In 1893, Kotoko was conquered by warlord Rabih az-Zubayr, who ruled it until 1900. Goulfey founded the short-lived Great Sultanate of Goulfey which was allied with the French. Eventually some of the states were incorporated into the French empire, and others into the German Empire.

Kotoko, along with the rest of Bornu, was split among European powers during Africa's colonial period. In modern times, there has been some conflict between the Kotoko and the Shuwa Arabs.

== Economy and culture ==
Musical instrument

The Kotoko kingdom had an active cloth making culture, with nearly every house having a weaving loom. The Kotoko made the tobe cloth, a prestige garment with a black or dark blue tint. This cloth was exported to Bornu. Logone-Birni had a market with local and long-distance trade items, which were bought and sold using the local metal currency. In Bornu, dyed tobes were exchanged for alloyed copper.

== Governmental structure ==
The Sultan (Mra) of Logone was a Sultan of the 1st-degree, ruling over 2nd-degree sultans who in turn ruled over 300 3rd-degree Chieftain rulers called Mès.
