= Karita =

Scientific classification
- Kingdom: Animalia
- Phylum: Arthropoda
- Subphylum: Chelicerata
- Class: Arachnida
- Order: Araneae
- Infraorder: Araneomorphae
- Family: Linyphiidae
- Genus: Karita; Tanasevitch, 2007
- Species: K. paludosa

Binomial name
- Karita paludosa (Duffey, 1971)

Genus of spiders

Karita is a monotypic genus of dwarf spiders containing the single species, Karita paludosa. It was first described by A. V. Tanasevitch in 2007, and has only been found in Belgium, Germany, Ireland, Poland, Russia, and United Kingdom.
