= Dziguilao =

Coordinates: 10°01′N 14°48′E

- Commune and town
- Interactive map of Dziguilao
- Country: Cameroon
- Time zone: UTC+1 (WAT)

Dziguilao is a town and commune in Cameroon.

== See also ==
- Communes of Cameroon
