= Kolofata =

Town and commune in Far North Region, Cameroon

Coordinates: 11°9′44″N 14°0′46″E

- Commune and town
- Interactive map of Kolofata
- Country: Cameroon
- Region: Extrême-Nord
- Department: Mayo-Sava
- Time zone: UTC+1 (WAT)

Kolofata is a town and commune in Cameroon.

== Boko Haram Attacks ==
On January 12, 2015 a military base in Kolofata was assaulted by Boko Haram. The Islamist group had attacked towns in Northern Cameroon in December 2014 The attack was repelled with only one Cameroonian officer killed. 143 Boko Haram insurgents were killed by the Cameroonian Army.

Another attack was reported in 2017.

== See also ==
- Communes of Cameroon
