= Touloum =

Coordinates: 10°11′N 14°50′E

- Commune and town
- Interactive map of Touloum
- Country: Cameroon
- Time zone: UTC+1 (WAT)

Touloum is a town and commune in Cameroon.

== See also ==
- Communes of Cameroon
