= Kaélé =

Village in the Far North Province, Cameroon

Kaélé <Dəb Kaele, Za Kaele>
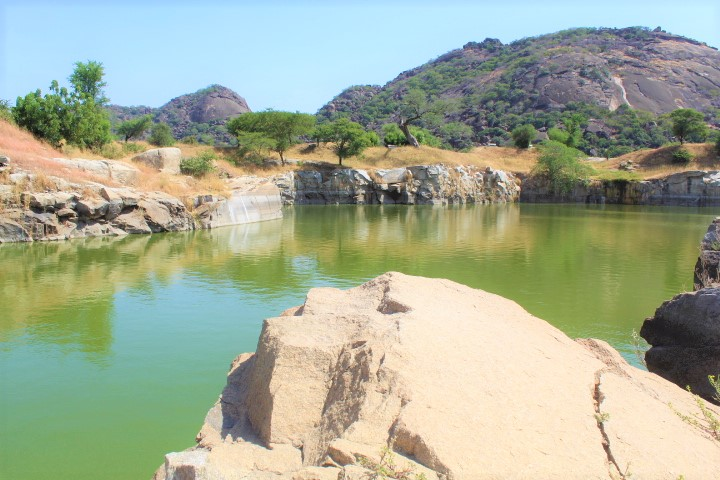
- Boboyo crocodile lake

- Location in Cameroon
- Coordinates: 10°6′N 14°27′E
- Country: Cameroon
- Province: Far North
- Department: Mayo-Kani
- Elevation: 377 m (1,237 ft)

Population (2012)
  - Total: 30,609

Kaélé is a town in Cameroon's Far North Province, on the Diamaré Plain at 10°6′00″N 14°27′00″E. It lies near the Chadian border and 104 km south of Maroua. The town has a population of roughly 30,600 and is the capital of the Mayo Kani division. The cottonseed oil company Diamaor runs a mill in the town. Kaélé is accessible by road and by airstrip.

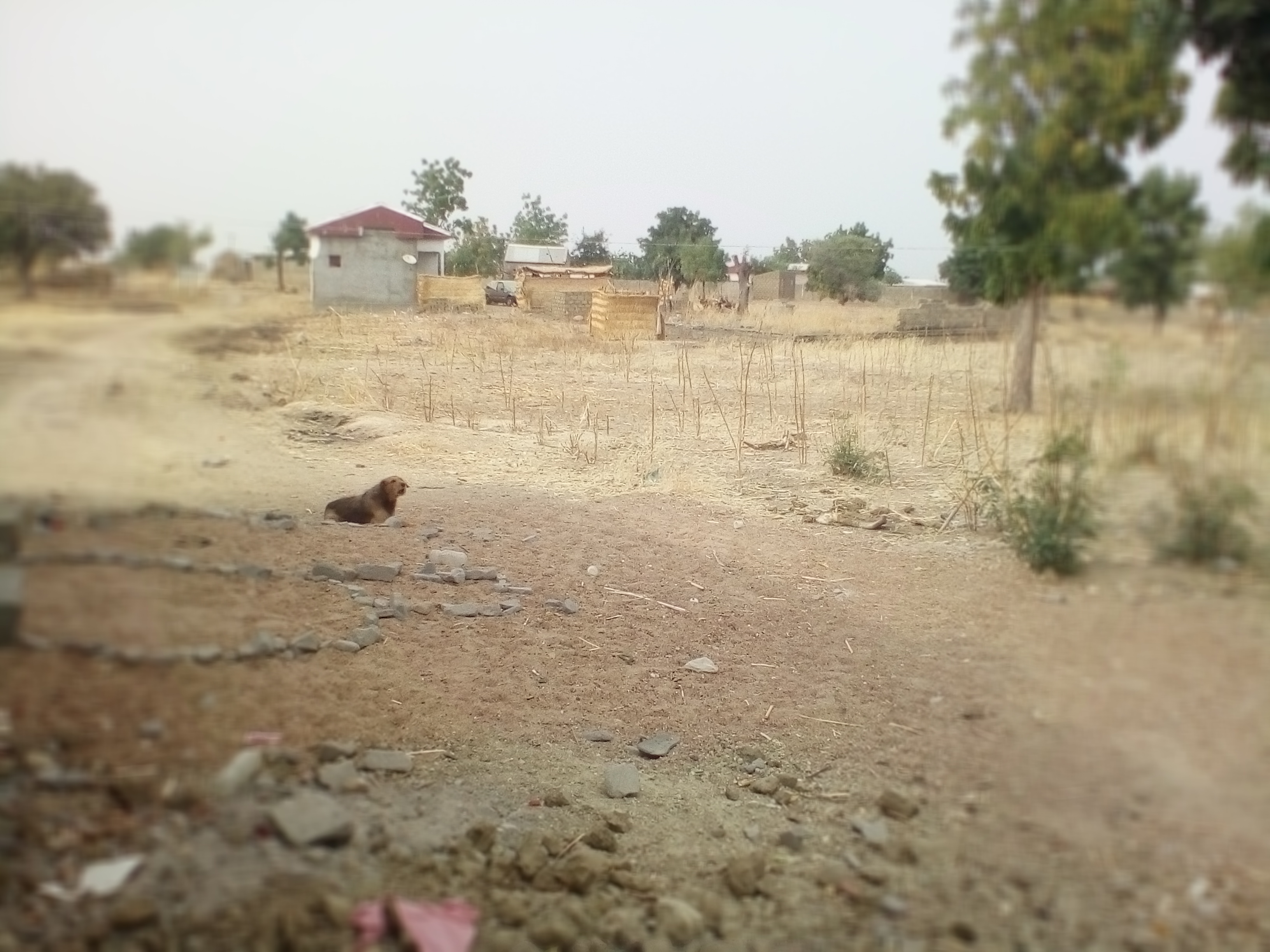
View of Kaélé

== Notable people ==
- Tikela Kemone (born 1950), Cameroonian politician
- Marthe Wandou (born 1963), Cameroonian activist

== Gallery ==
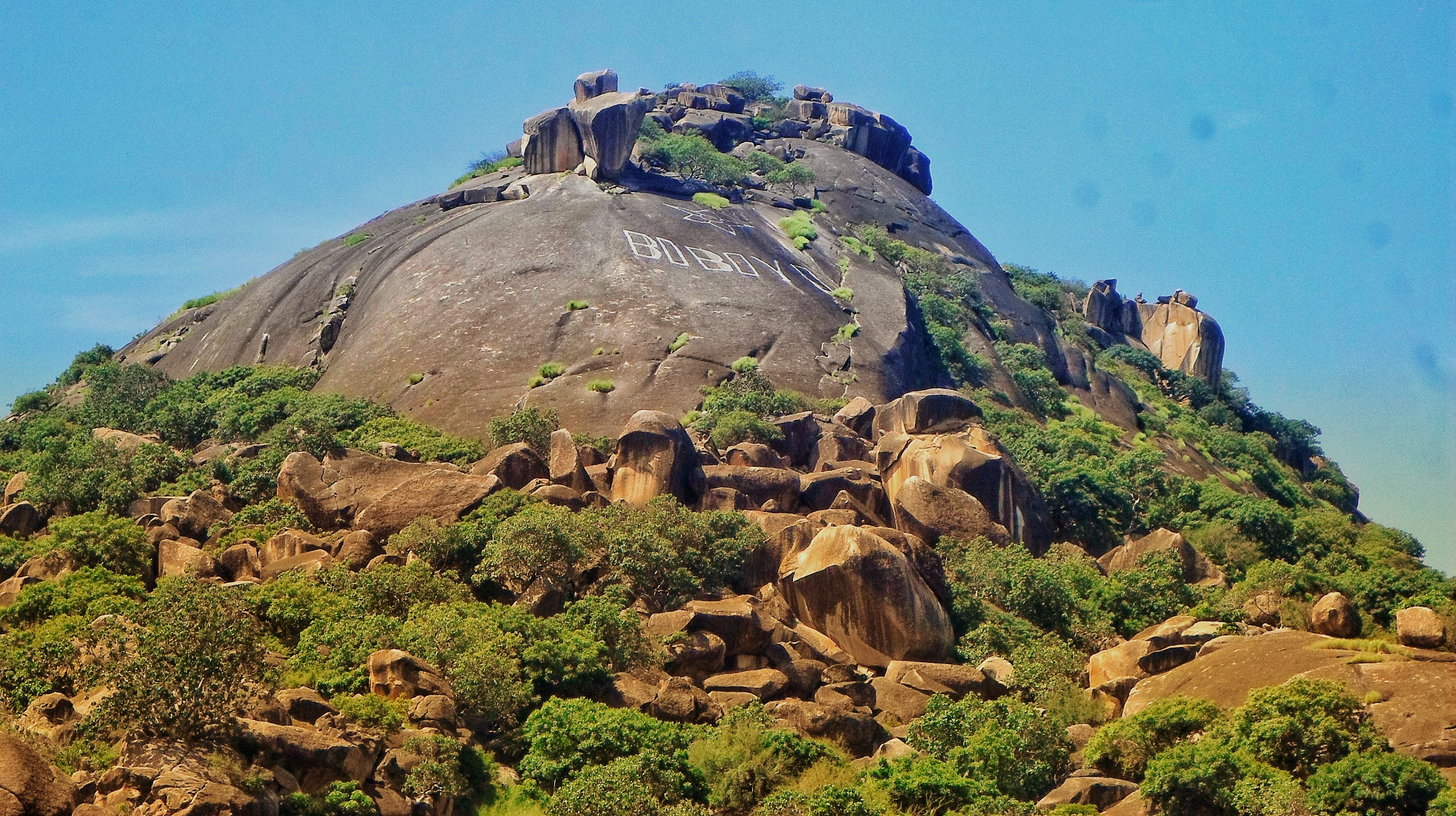
Mount Boboyo

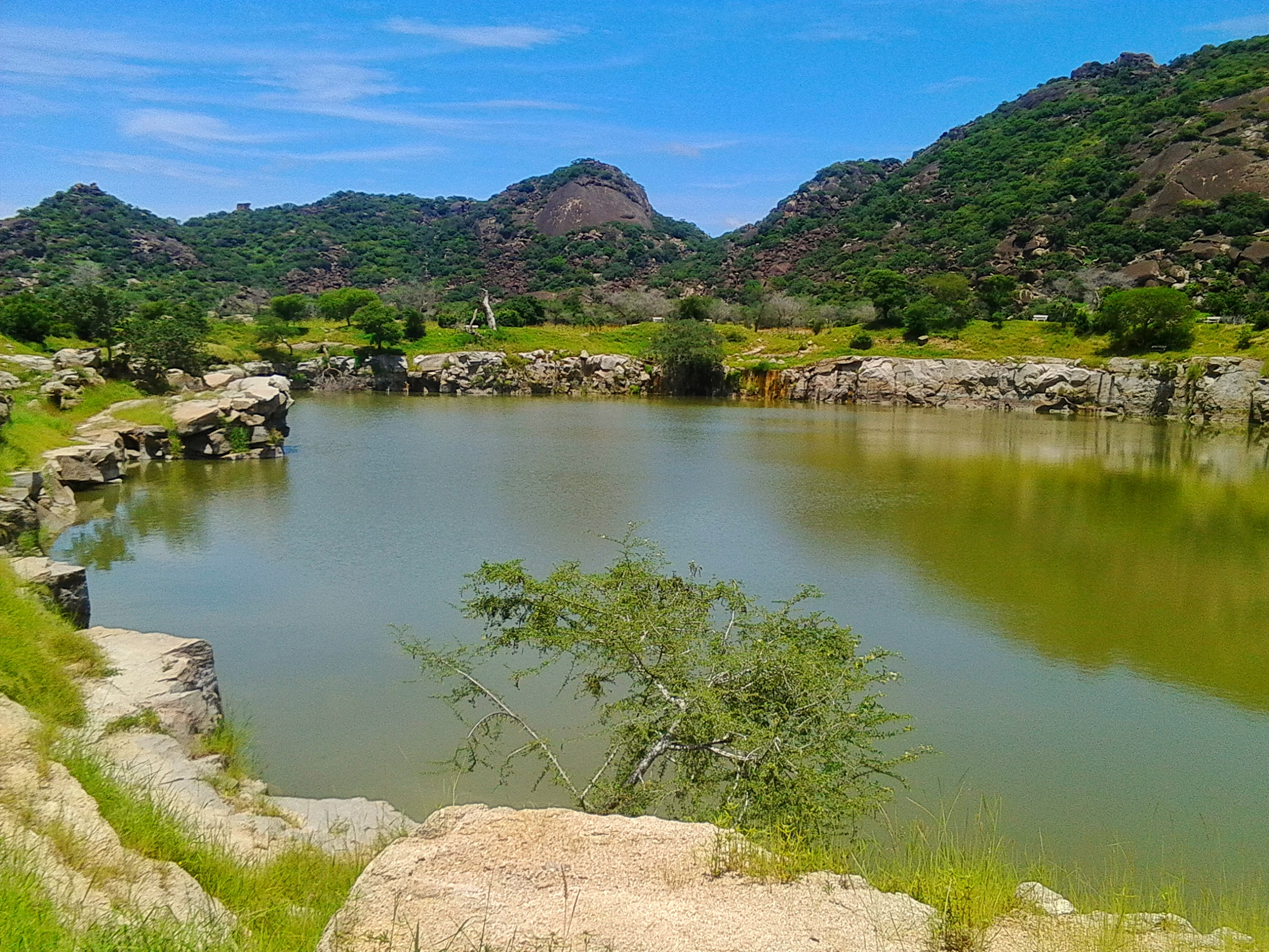
Lake Boboyo

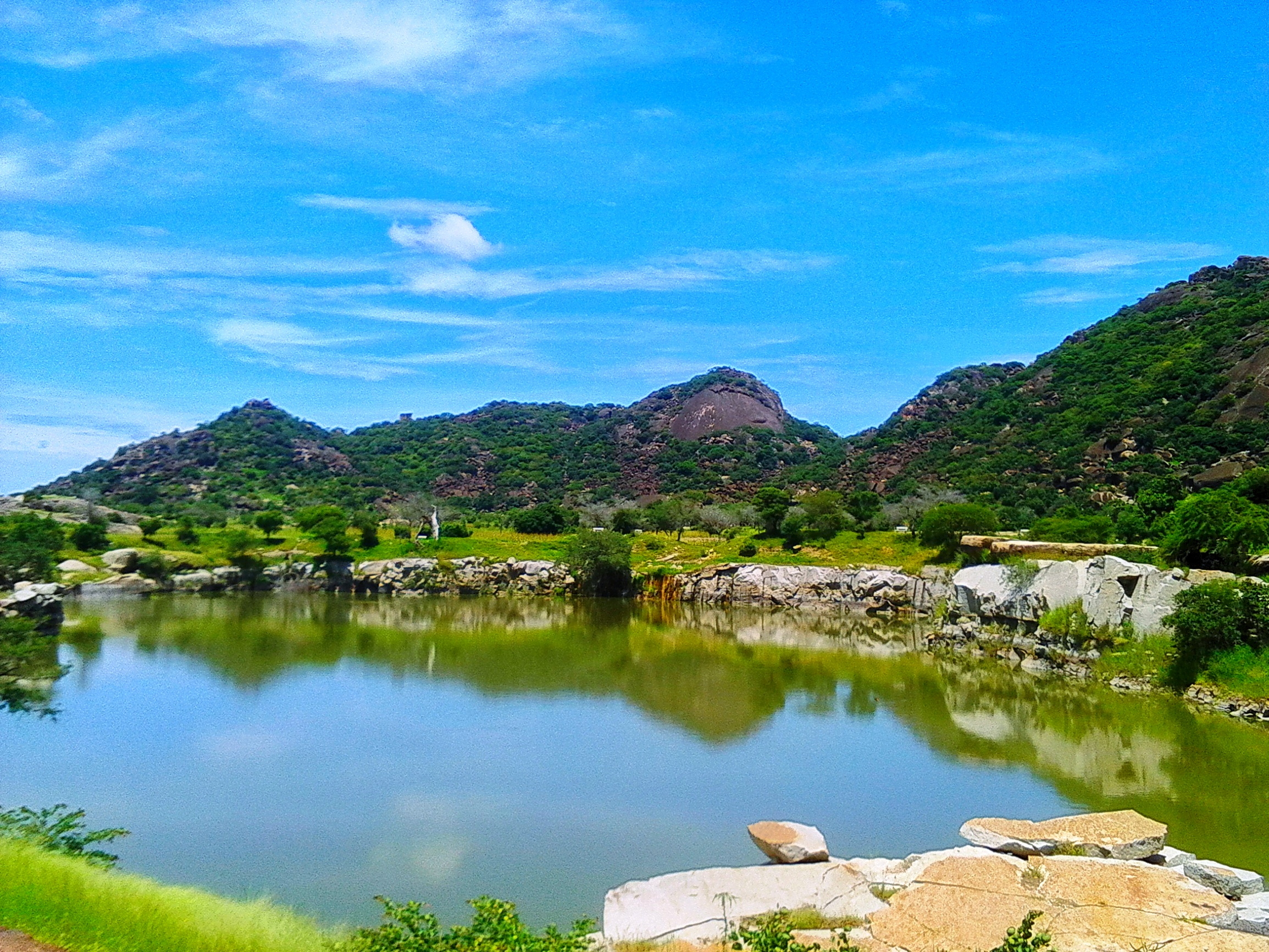
Lake Boboyo
