= Makary, Cameroon =

Makary, Cameroon Mafaté, Makari
- Location in Cameroon
- Coordinates: 12°34′27″N 14°27′14″E
- Country: Cameroon
- Region: Far North Province
- Department: Logone-et-Chari

Population (2005)
  - Total: 6,287
- Time zone: UTC+1 (CET)
  - Summer (DST): UTC+1 (CEST)
- UFI: -3152074

Makary is a town in Logone-et-Chari, Far North Region, Cameroon, West Africa. The town is located on the right (east) bank of a distributary of the Chari River in the delta just before it enters Lake Chad. The people are known as Kotoko, and the local language is Mpade; Fulani (Fulfulde) is the trade language. The primary economic activity was and is fishing.

== History ==
Makary was part of the indigenous Sao civilisation that occupied the land south of Lake Chad from about the Sixth Century A.D. going into decline by at least the Fourteenth Century. With the decline of the Sao confederation, Makary was an independent kingdom, one of the Kotoko kingdom city-states. In the early Fifteenth Century, Makary went from being an ally of King Idris Alooma to being a part of the Bornu Empire, and soon converted to Islam. However, by the late Eighteenth Century, although nominally still part of Bornu, the city states had reasserted themselves, and by 1800 Makary had formed a federation of seven fortified towns under the prince (Mé) of Makary.

In March 1846 Umar Kura, nominal general of the Bornu sultan Ibrahim IV, suffered a defeat at Kousséri by the forces of the Kingdom of Baguirmi, itself weakened by attacks from the Wadai Empire. By the 1890s Rabih az-Zubayr was able to move into the power vacuum created by these contending forces and took first Oubangui-Chari, then Baguirmi, and then in 1894 Bornu. This soon brought Makary under Rabih's control. After Rabih was killed by the French in 1900, Makary fell under the German sphere of influence.

Despite the changes in rulers and religion the culture of Makary seems to represent an uninterrupted continuation of the original Sao culture.

== Villages ==
- Bodo
- Biamo
- Goura

== Geography ==
Makary sits on the delta; however the river bed of the Chari River is dry most of the year, only filling with the onset of the rainy season in July and drying up again by the end of October.

== Climate ==
Makary has a hot desert climate (Köppen BWh), bordering on a hot semi-arid climate (Köppen BSh), with little to no rain outside of the wet season (July to September) and the temperature being hot year-round. The average annual mean temperature is 27.5 °C (81.5 °F), the average annual high temperature is 35.1 °C (95.2 °F) and the average annual low temperature is 20.0 °C (68.0 °F). The hottest time of year is from April to June, just before the wet season starts. April and May are the hottest months, with April having the highest average high at 40.0 °C (104.0 °F), while May has the highest mean at 31.8 °C (89.2 °F) and average low at 24.6 °C (76.3 °F). August and January have the lowest average highs at 31.2 °C (88.2 °F) and 31.4 °C (88.5 °F) respectively, with January having the lowest mean at 22.3 °C (72.1 °F) and lowest average low at 13.3 °C (55.9 °F).

Makary receives 397 millimetres (15.6 in) of rain, with a distinct wet and dry season like most of Cameroon. Almost no rain falls from November to April. August, the wettest month, receives 140 millimetres (5.5 in) of rainfall on average, followed by July with 114 millimetres (4.5 in).

Climate data for Makary
| Month | Jan | Feb | Mar | Apr | May | Jun | Jul | Aug | Sep | Oct | Nov | Dec | Year |
|---|---|---|---|---|---|---|---|---|---|---|---|---|---|
| Mean daily maximum °C (°F) | 31.4 (88.5) | 34.5 (94.1) | 37.8 (100.0) | 40.0 (104.0) | 39.0 (102.2) | 37.0 (98.6) | 33.1 (91.6) | 31.2 (88.2) | 33.4 (92.1) | 36.5 (97.7) | 34.9 (94.8) | 32.4 (90.3) | 35.1 (95.2) |
| Daily mean °C (°F) | 22.3 (72.1) | 25.2 (77.4) | 28.7 (83.7) | 31.7 (89.1) | 31.8 (89.2) | 30.5 (86.9) | 28.0 (82.4) | 26.6 (79.9) | 27.8 (82.0) | 28.6 (83.5) | 25.8 (78.4) | 23.1 (73.6) | 27.5 (81.5) |
| Mean daily minimum °C (°F) | 13.3 (55.9) | 15.9 (60.6) | 19.7 (67.5) | 23.4 (74.1) | 24.6 (76.3) | 24.1 (75.4) | 23.0 (73.4) | 22.1 (71.8) | 22.2 (72.0) | 20.8 (69.4) | 16.7 (62.1) | 13.8 (56.8) | 20.0 (67.9) |
| Average rainfall mm (inches) | 0 (0) | 0 (0) | 0 (0) | 4 (0.2) | 20 (0.8) | 38 (1.5) | 114 (4.5) | 140 (5.5) | 68 (2.7) | 13 (0.5) | 0 (0) | 0 (0) | 397 (15.7) |
Source: Climate-Data.org
