= Amchide =

- Location in Cameroon
- Coordinates: 11°14′41″N 14°8′38″E
- Country: Cameroon
- Region: Far North
- Department: Mayo-Sava

Amchide is a town in Cameroon, on the border with Nigeria. It abuts the Nigerian town of Banki, with streets and even houses straddling the border.

In 2014, the town was the site of fighting between Boko Haram and the Cameroonian military, leading some residents to flee the area.

In February, 2014, the Nigerian military sent troops to Amchide to close the border, in an effort to prevent Boko Haram attacks. Cameroonian troops also patrolled the town. The impact of closing the border on Amchide merchants has been described as "devastating", and the price of fuel and transport has become unaffordable in much of Northern Cameroon.

In October 2014, Boko Haram fighters with armoured support entered Amchide and Limani, another border town, killing at least 30 civilians. The Cameroonian Army reported 107 Boko Haram members were killed in the fighting that ensued.

On 28 December 2014, Cameroonian troops repelled four simultaneous Boko Haram raids into the towns of Amchide, Makari, Limani, Guirvidig, Waza and Achigachia, all located in Cameroon's Far North region.

== See also ==
- December 2014 Cameroon clashes
- Refugees in Cameroon
