= Moutourwa =

Coordinates: 10.1990°N 14.1778°E

- Commune and town
- Interactive map of Moutourwa
- Country: Cameroon
- Time zone: UTC+1 (WAT)

Moutourwa is a town and commune in Cameroon.

== See also ==
- Communes of Cameroon
