= Kousséri =

City in Far North Province, Cameroon

Kousséri قصور Mser, Fort Fureau
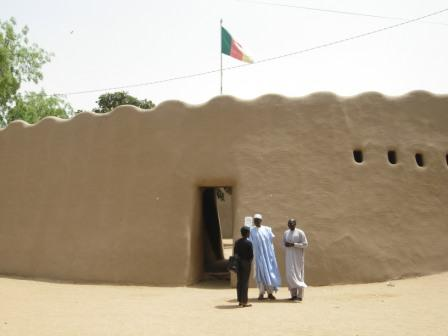

- Location in Cameroon
- Coordinates: 12°04′42″N 15°01′51″E
- Country: Cameroon
- Province: Far North Province
- Division: Logone-et-Chari
- Elevation: 271 m (889 ft)

Population (2005)
  - Total: 89,123 (Census)
- Climate: BSh

Kousséri (from Arabic: قصور quṣūr meaning "palaces"), founded and known as Mser in the indigenous Mser language, is a city in Far North Province, Cameroon. It is the capital of the Logone-et-Chari department. It is a market town, and its population has recently been swollen by refugees from Chad. It had a population of 89,123 at the 2005 Census. The majority of the population are Shuwa Arabs with Chadian Arabic used as the lingua franca.

It forms a transborder agglomeration with the city of N'Djamena, capital of Chad, from which it is separated by the Logone River and the Chari River.

== History ==
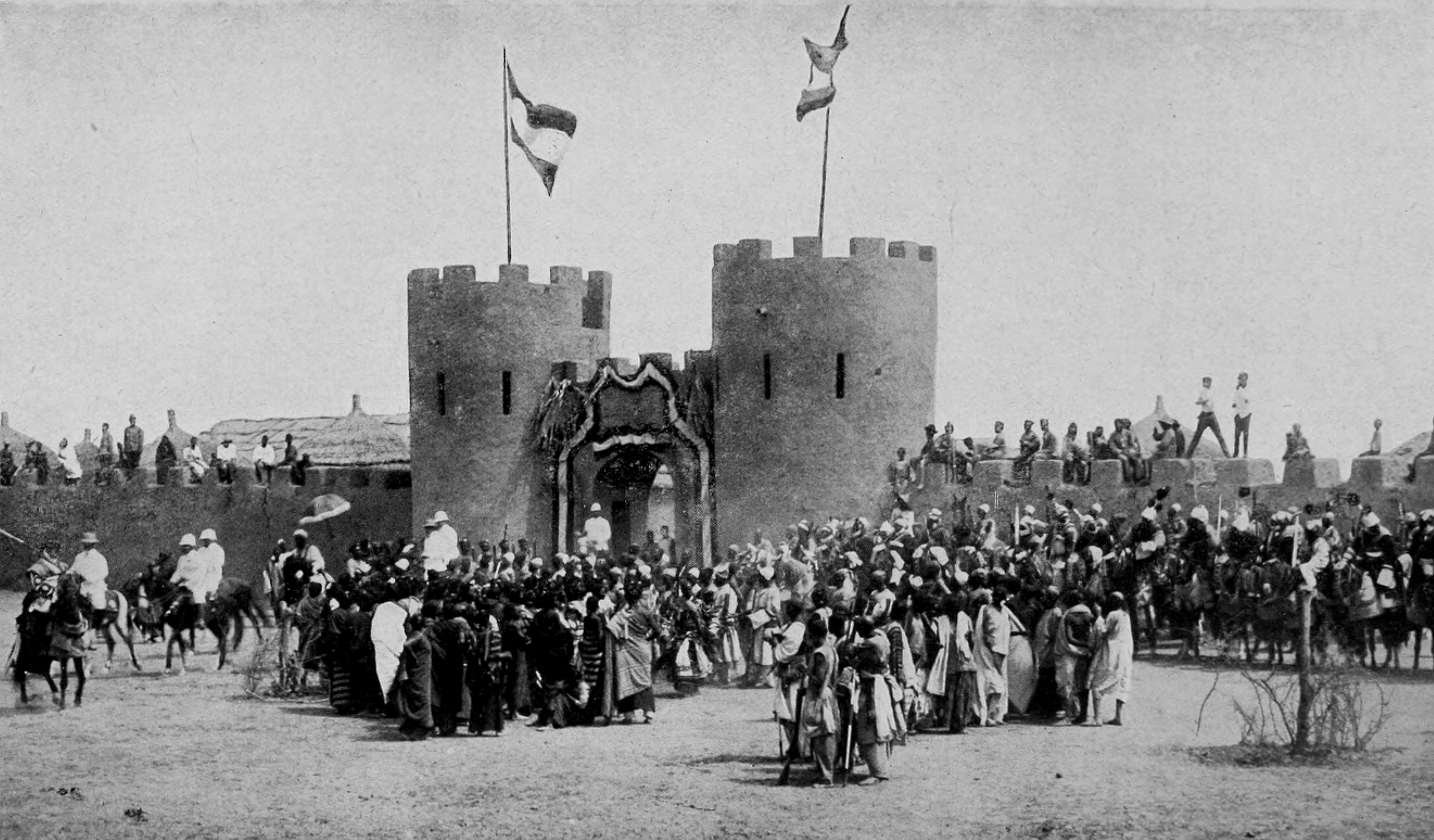
German station in Kousseri (1910)

Kousséri was an independent city state from c.1000 until around the late 1500s when it was incorporated into the Southern Kotoko Kingdom.

Kousséri was later incorporated as part of the Bornu Empire. In March 1846, Omar (son of Sheik Mohammed), nominal general of the Bornu sultan Ibrahim, suffered a defeat at Kousséri.

In 1900 the village was occupied by soldiers of Rabij az-Zubayr (Rabih), a Sudanese warlord. On 3 March it was taken by the combined forces of two French expeditions, one under Major Lamy from Algeria and the other under Lt. Paul Joalland from Senegal and local forces opposed to Rabih. Rabih was not in Kousseri at the time but established himself in a fort on the right bank of the Chari. Lamy did not think he had sufficient forces to attack Rabih immediately, but waited until the beginning of April when he was joined by a third expedition that was coming up the Chari under Émile Gentil. When he arrived the combined forces crossed the Chari and attacked Rabih. The battle of Kousséri was a decisive battle which secured French rule over Chad.

== Gallery ==
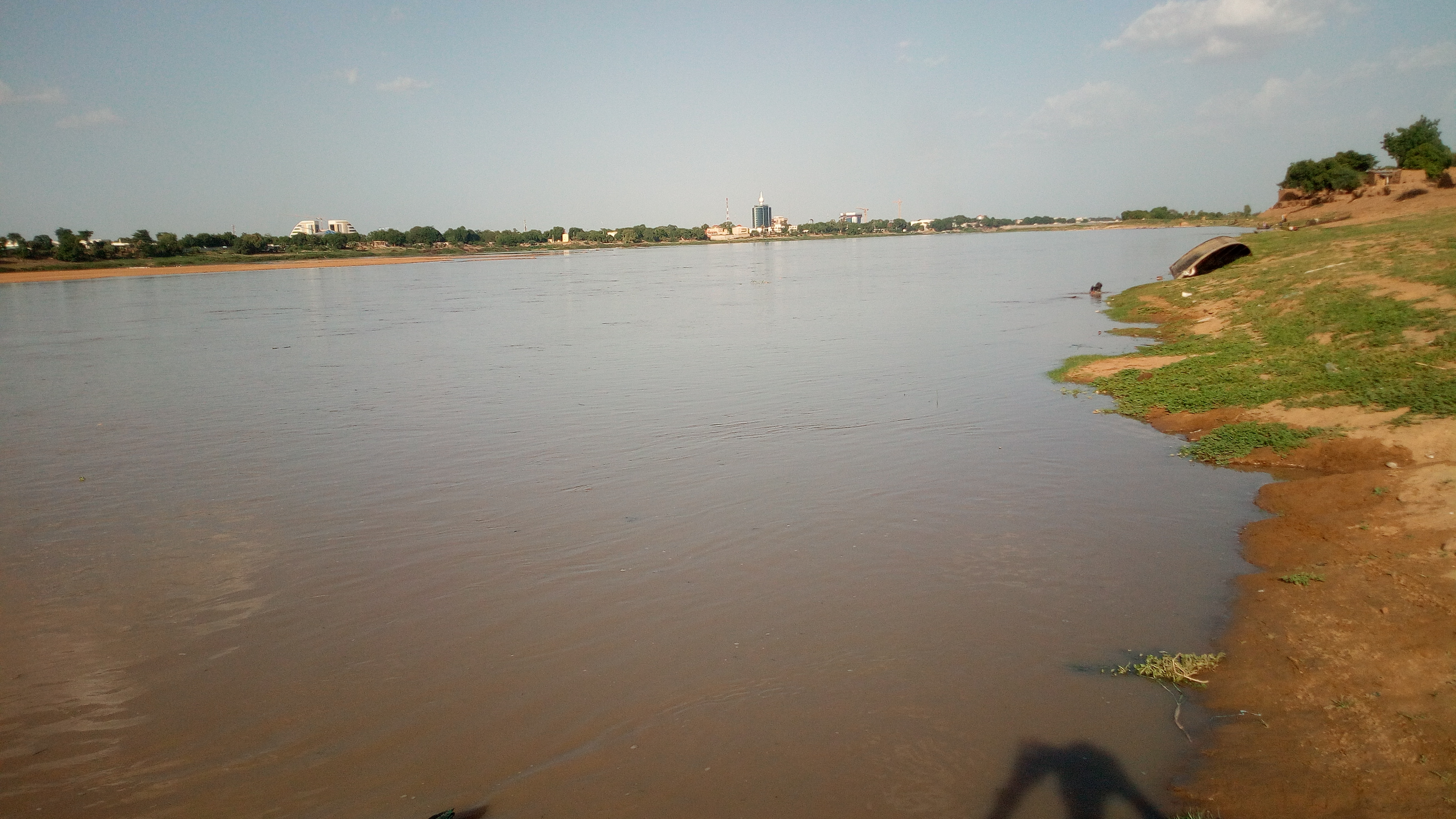
Chari river, from Kousséri

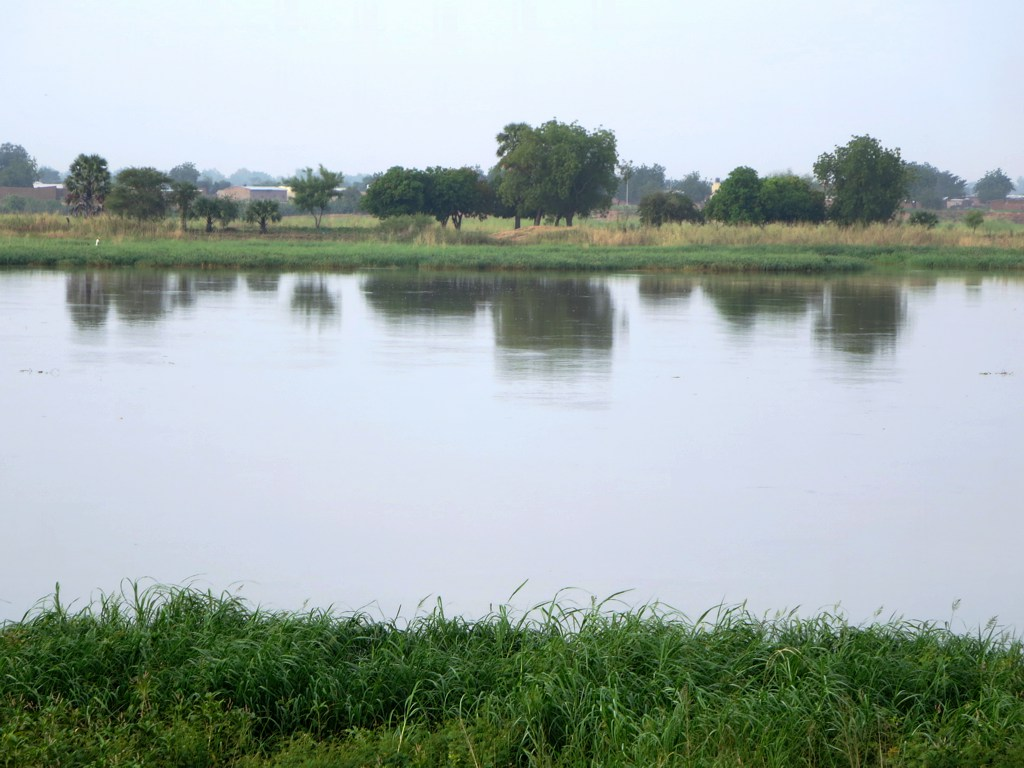
Chari river, in Central Africa, separates N'Djamena, in Chad, from Kousséri in Cameroon

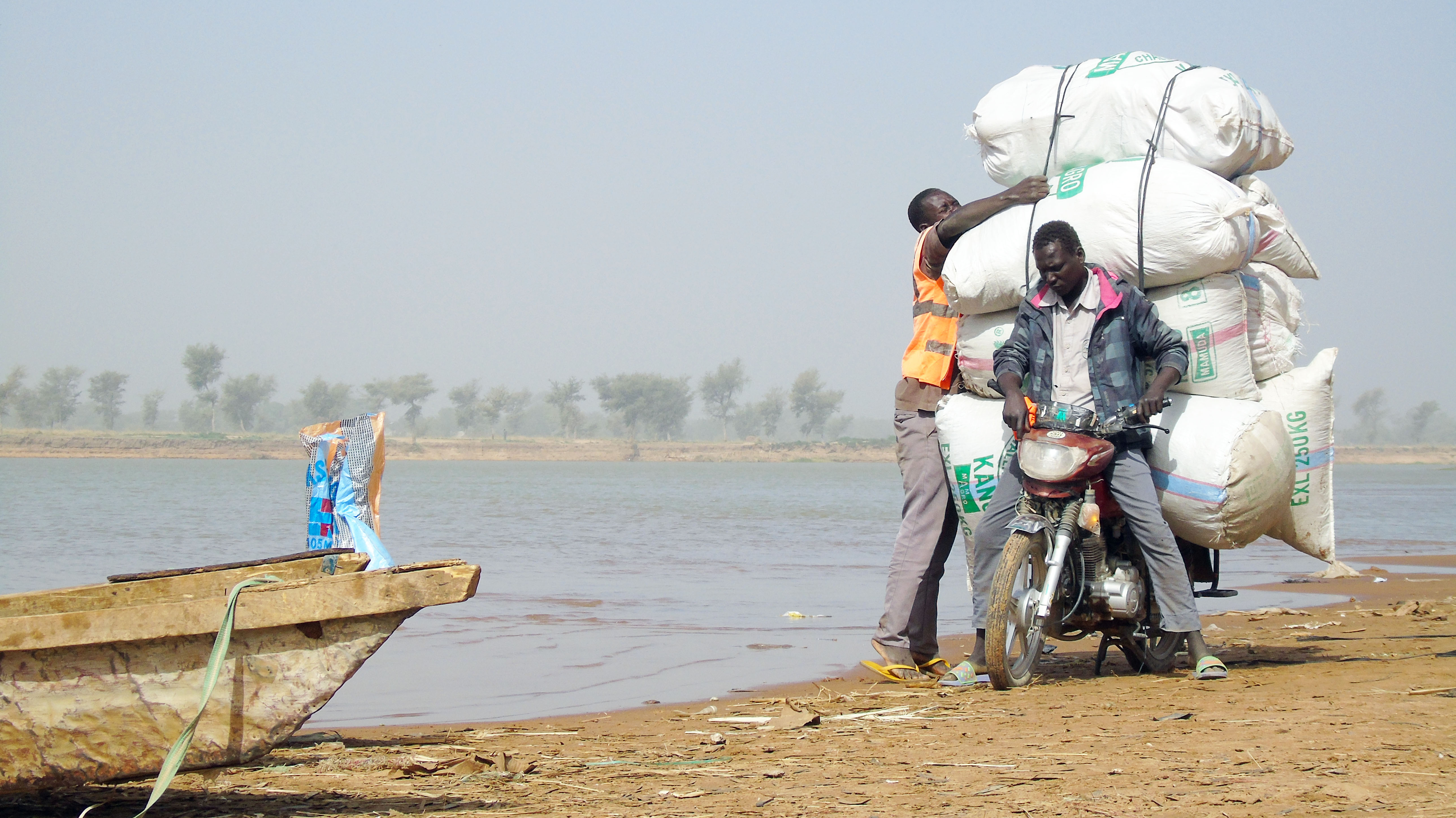
Trade on Logone river
