= Far North Region (Cameroon) =

Region of Cameroon

Far North Region Région de l'Extrême-Nord
- Region of Cameroon
- Location of Far North Region within Cameroon
- Coordinates: 11°00′N 14°30′E
- Country: Cameroon
- Capital: Maroua
- Departments: Diamaré, Logone-et-Chari, Mayo-Danay, Mayo-Kani, Mayo-Sava, Mayo-Tsanaga

Government
  - Governor: Midjiyawa Bakary

Area
  - Total: 34,263 km^{2} (13,229 sq mi)

Population (2015)
  - Total: 3,993,007
  - Density: 116.54/km^{2} (301.84/sq mi)
- Time zone: UTC+01:00 (WAT)
- HDI (2022): 0.470 low · 9th of 10

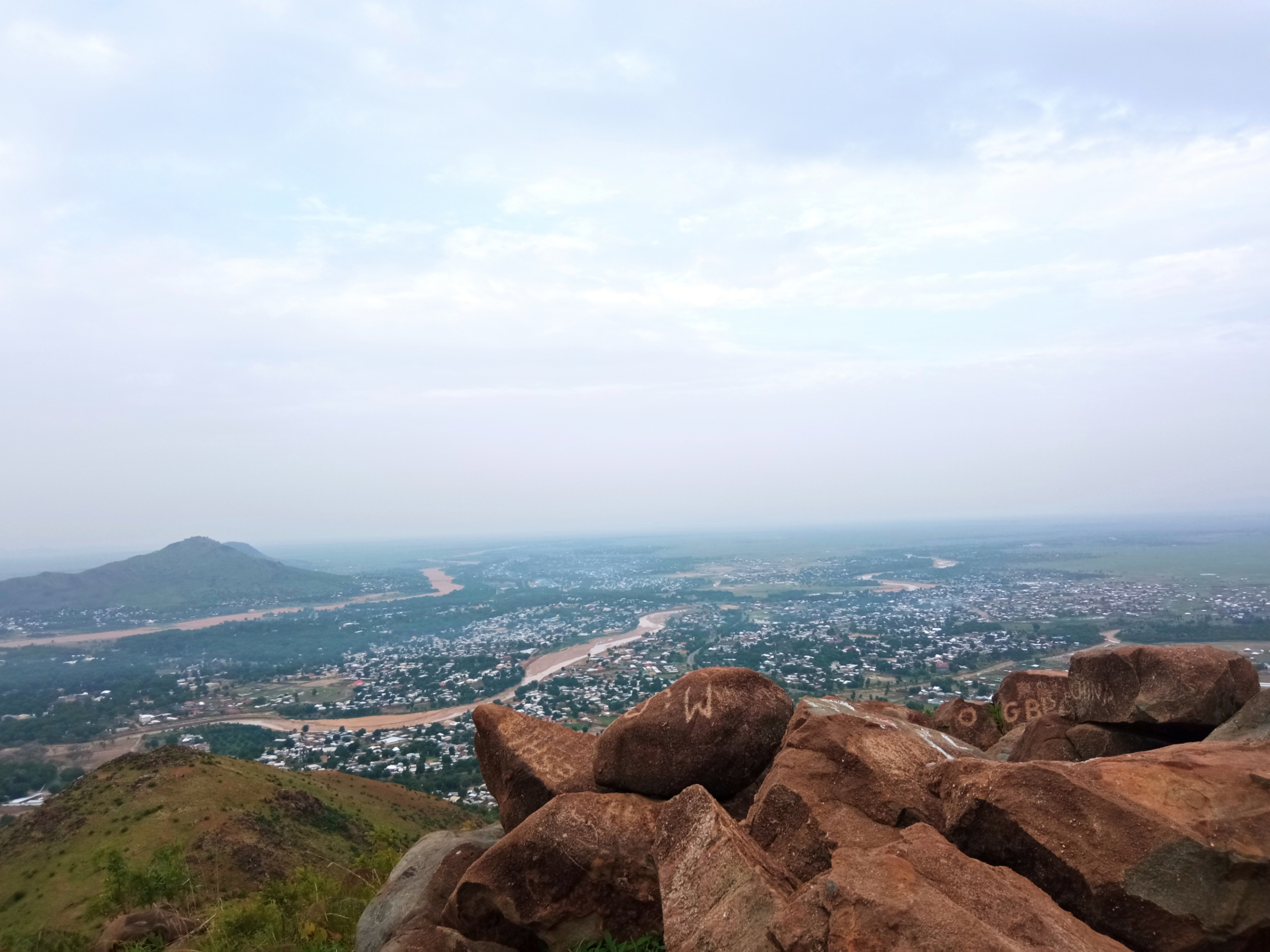
View of Maroua in the Far North Region

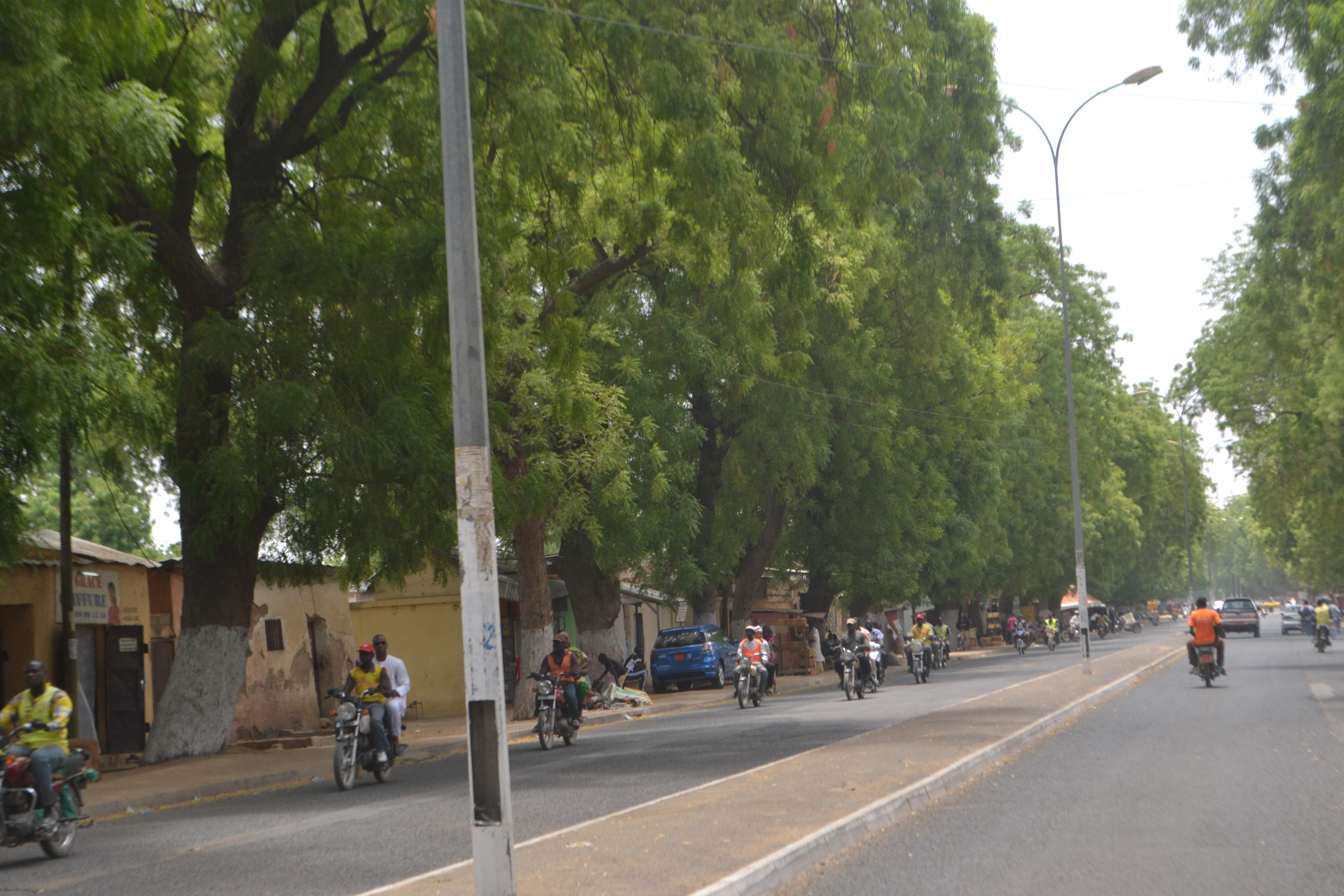
A street In Maroua Town

The Far North Region, also known as the Extreme North Region (French: Région de l'Extrême-Nord; Adamawa Fulfulde: woilare) is the northernmost and most populous constituent province of the Republic of Cameroon. It borders the North Region to the south, Chad to the east, and Nigeria to the west. The capital is Maroua.

The province is one of Cameroon's most culturally diverse. Over 50 different ethnic groups populate the area, including the Shuwa Arabs, Fulani, and Kapsiki. Most inhabitants speak the Fulani language Fulfulde, Chadian Arabic, and French.

== Geography ==
=== Land ===
Sedimentary rock such as alluvium, clay, limestone, and sandstone forms the greatest share of the Far North's geology. These deposits follow the province's rivers, such as the Logone and Mayo Tsanaga, as they empty into Lake Chad to the north. At the province's south, a band of granite separates the sedimentary area from a zone of metamorphic rock to the southwest. This latter region includes deposits of gneiss, mica, and schists. The Rhumsiki Valley, a mountainous field littered by the cores of extinct volcanoes, constitutes a small area of volcanic rock, such as trachyte and rhyolite.

The Far North's soils are a bit more complex. Much of the province is composed of young soils rich in raw minerals. This is true of much of the land south of Lake Chad, and of the Mandara Mountains on the western border with Nigeria. Soil here is black clay (alluvial soil). The seasonal flooding of the Logone River gives rise to a north–south band of hydromorphic soils at the border with Chad. The remainder of the territory, the Diamaré Plain and the El Beïd River valley, is made up of ferruginous soils. The province's dry/wet seasonal variations create relatively shallow, ferrous or lateritic soils.

=== Drainage ===
A number of rivers criss-cross the territory, many of them rising in the Mandara Mountains. The Mayo Kébi, Mayo Louti, and their tributaries form part of the Niger River basin. The Louti rises in the Mandaras, passing and swelling the Kébi in the North Province. The Kébi rises south of Yagoua and flows into western Chad.

The province's other rivers are part of the Chad Basin. The El Beid River flows northwest from the Kalamalou National Park and forms the northernmost stretch of the border between Cameroon and Nigeria. The Mayo Tsanaga rises south and west of the El Béïd's source and moves eastward at the north of the Diamaré Depression. The Logone rises west of the territory and flows north to form most of the border between the Far North and Chad. It eventually meets the Chari, which also rises in Chad. The Chari forms the remainder of the Chad-Cameroon border beginning at Kousséri before emptying into Lake Chad.

These rivers all follow a tropical regime, fluctuating between high water in the wet season (May to September) and low water in the dry season (October to April). At the height of the dry season, many of the waterways disappear completely or else diminish to a mere trickle. The Logone all but disappears during the wet season. The low elevation of the Chad basin (200–500 metres) causes flooding during the wet season; the Logone is especially prone to this, and much of its basin is marshlike conditions along its length during the wet season. Even during the dry season, some of these remain, called Yaéré in Fulfulde. The El Beïd and Serbewel Rivers drain these marshy areas into Lake Chad. The Diamaré Plain, part of the Chad plain, occupies the southeastern third of the province. It is not as prone to flooding due to a number of inselbergs through the area.

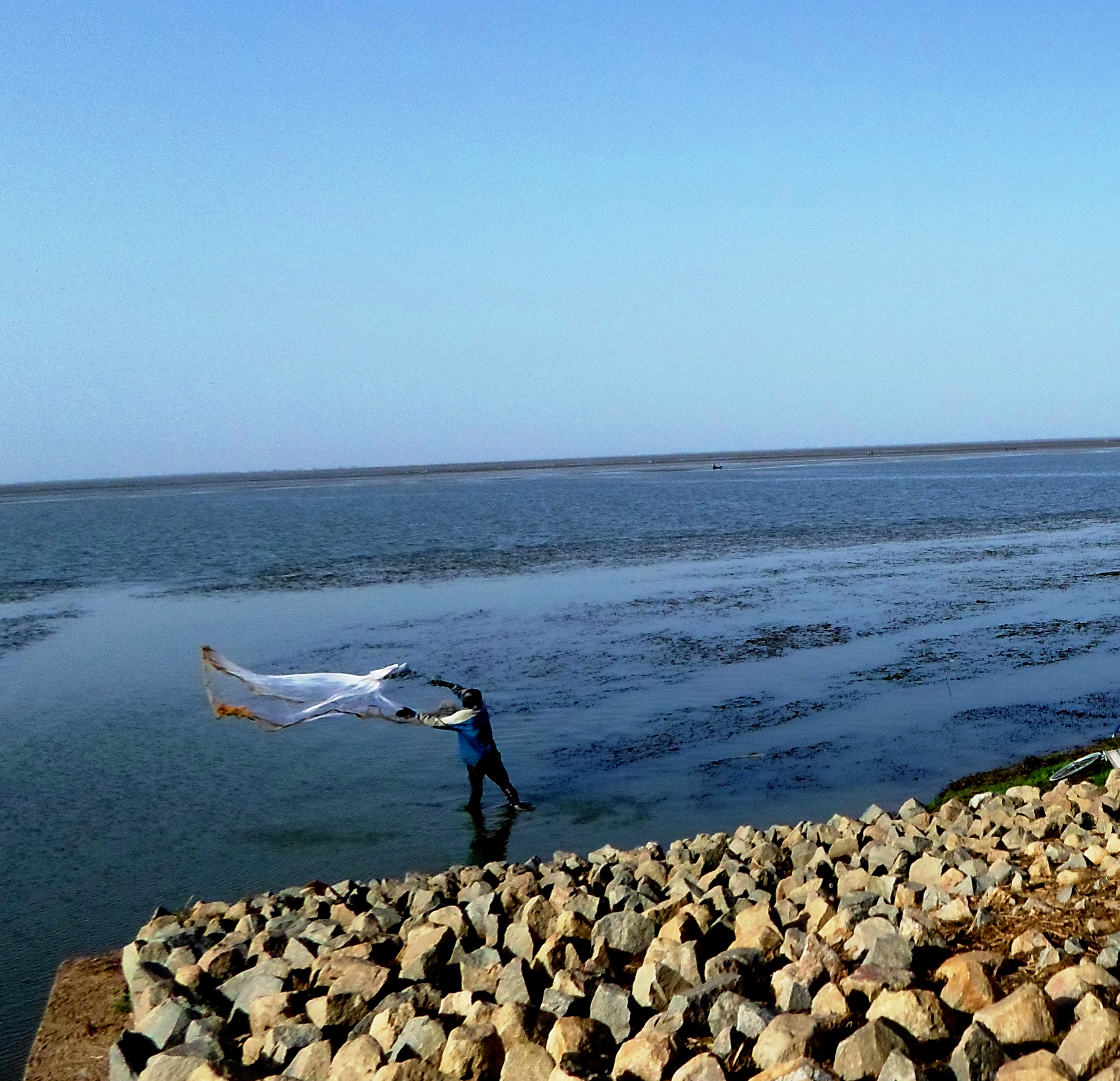
Maga Lake in the Far North Region of Cameroon

The province is also home to a number of lakes. The most prominent of these is Lake Chad. The lake was formed by a tectonic depression that has since been filled in by the area's rivers. However, over time, these rivers have deposited sediment as well, making Lake Chad nearly disappear in the past. This is a cause of concern, since when the Logone and Mayo Kébi flood, they meet. This diverts water from the Logone to the Kébi, and ultimately the Bénoué. This has caused some scientists to predict that in the future, river capture will occur, depriving Lake Chad of one of its major sources. Much of Lake Chad evaporates each year and must be replaced by rains from the wet season.

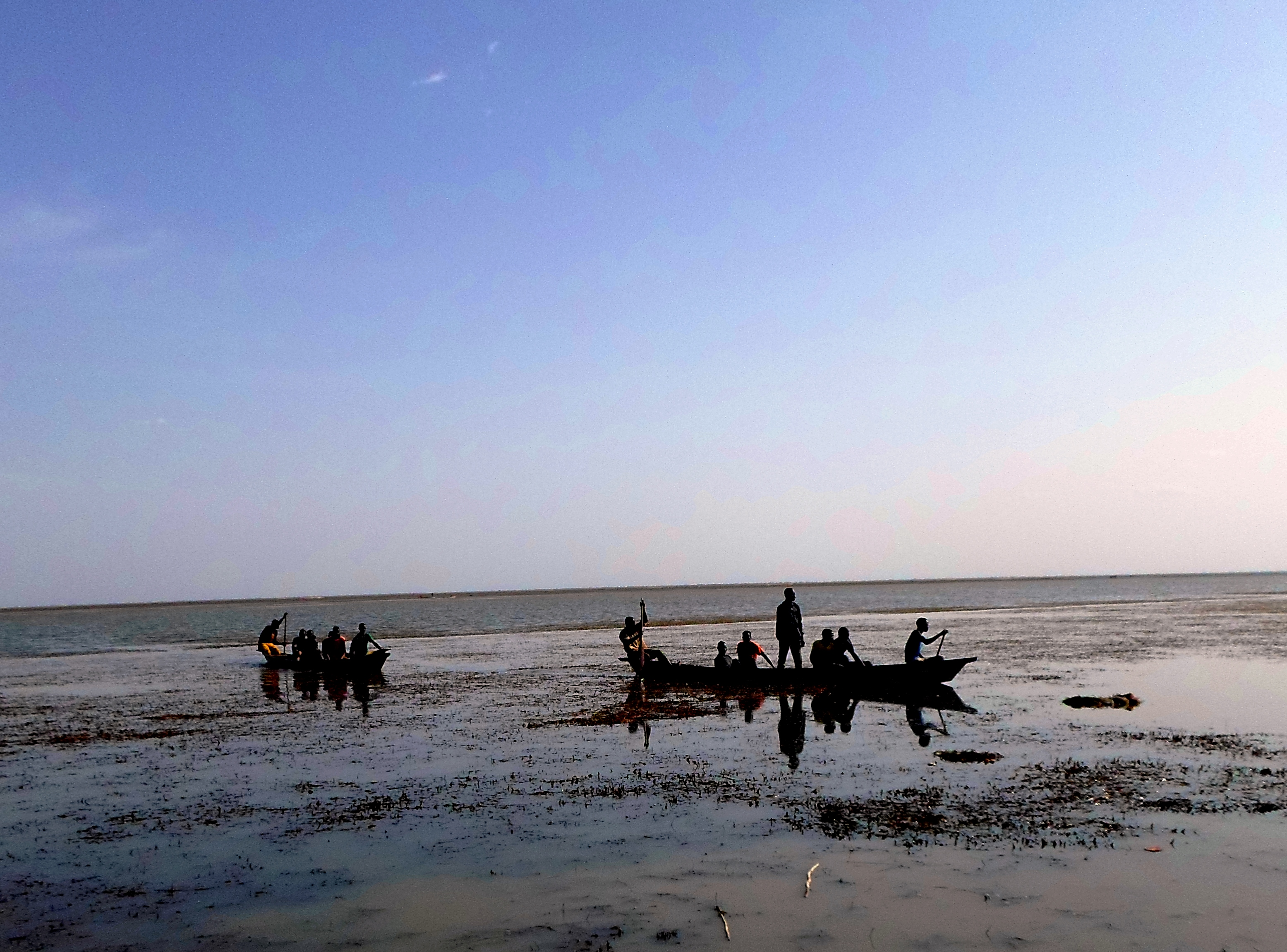
Local people fishing in Maga Lake

Other lakes include Lake Fianga, which exists only during the seasonal flooding of the Logone; during the dry season, it is at best a swamp. Maga Lake, south of the town of the same name at the eastern border, is an artificial body of 6,000 square metres. It is known for its fishing.

=== Relief ===
Most of the Far North lies at a relatively low elevation. This lower-lying portion makes up part of the Chad Plain and slopes gently from about 500 metres in the southwest to 200 metres at the Logone River. The average elevation of this basin is 280 metres. The Diamaré Plain occupies the lower third of the Chad plain and is characterised by a number of isolated inselbergs.

The Mandara Mountains at the southwestern border with Nigeria form the highest point, lying between 500 and 1000 metres, with an average of about 900 metres. Mount Tourou is the highest point, at 1,442 metres. These mountains likely arose as a result of the same tectonic activity that gave rise to the Bénoué Depression in the North Province. The area was once volcanically active, as a number of freestanding necks of trachyte and rhyolite of extinct volcanoes attest. The most spectacular of these lie in the valley by the tourist village of Rhumsiki. The part of the range that lies within the Far North is on a middle plateau at about 800–900 metres. Isolated mountains continue into the Diamaré Plain. The mountains' northern extent is hilly, dissected by a number of rivers.

=== Climate ===
The Far North is hot and dry. Beginning at 10° N, the climate is tropical and Sahelian, and rainfall is a relatively small 400 to 900 mm (16 to 35 in) per year, with rains falling a bit more frequently in the Mandara region. South of 10°, the region west of the Mayo Kébi and south to the border with Chad, in the Cameroonian beak. Here, climate is tropical of the Sudan type, with higher rainfalls of 900 to 1,500 mm (35 to 59 in) per year. Temperatures average 26 °C (79 °F), except for the Chad Basin, where they climb to 28 °C (82 °F). Actual temperatures of course fluctuate with the seasons, however. At Kousséri, for example, there is an 8.9 °C (16.0 °F) difference between January (23.5 °C (74.3 °F)) and August (32.4 °C (90.3 °F)).

The Far North has two seasons: one dry, and one wet. These are further broken down based on average temperatures, yielding four distinct periods in the Sudan area: dry and relatively cool from November to January as the province experiences a shade of winter from climes further north, dry and hot from January to April, torrentially rainy from April to June, and cool and sporadically wet from June to November. In the Sahel zone, the wet periods are shorter, lasting only five to seven months in the south but shortening toward Lake Chad. Temperatures reach their highest levels from January to May. Beginning at about 11° N, the province only experiences about 25 to 30 rainy days each year.

=== Plant and animal life ===
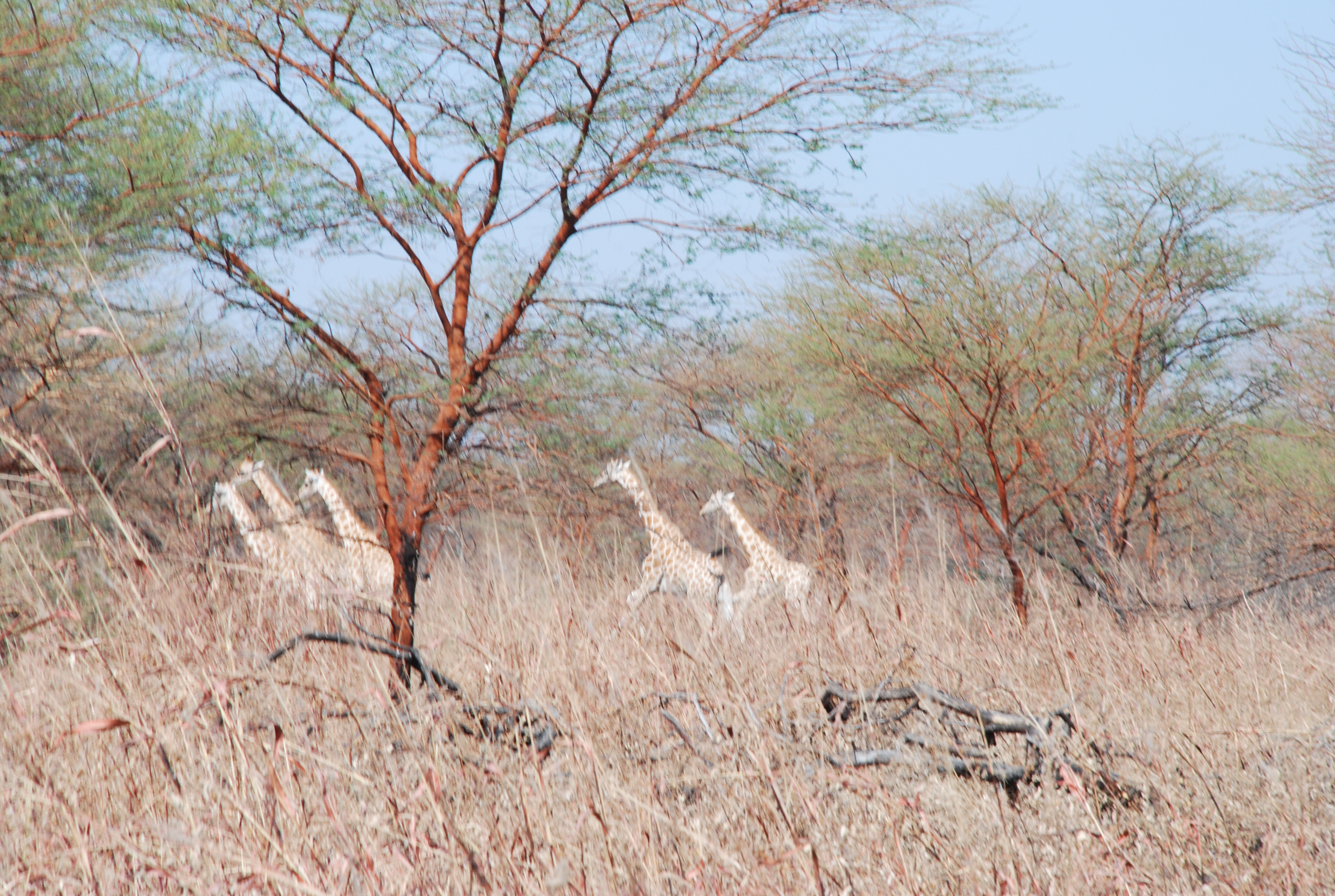
Giraffes in Waza National Park during the dry season

The whole territory of the Far North Province was once home to most of Africa's iconic species: antelope, jackals, cheetahs, crocodiles, elephants, giraffes, heron, hippopotami, hyenas, leopards, lions, monkeys, warthogs, and others. Centuries of human habitation have today forced these species back to a few protected areas and national parks. Foremost among these is Waza National Park (Parc National du Waza), which occupies 1700 km^{2}. The park was created in 1968, and has since grown to be one of Cameroon's largest tourist attractions. Kalamaloué National Park (Parc National de Kalamaloué) is a smaller protected area, which protects 45 km^{2} in the narrow neck of land separating Nigeria and Chad at the province's northernmost reaches. This park protects those species that routinely traverse Cameroon in their yearly migrations. Mozogo Gokoro National Park houses a diverse number of monkey and reptile species within 14 km^{2}.

The status of the province's wildlife remains uncertain, as corruption has allowed even these protected areas to be used by poachers. Some villages have embraced the animals, however. The town of Logone-Birni, for example, is called "the village of the crocodiles".

Savanna makes up the province's primary vegetation. Most of the area is thus covered in thin grasses punctuated by thorny shrubs such as Baobab, Faidherbia, and Karita. Those areas that have higher rainfall—south of 10&729 N and the Mandara Mountains—have thicker grasses and more and larger trees. Here the shrubs have thick bark to withstand the fires that sometimes ravage the area during the dry season. The frequently flooded Logone Valley and the perimeter of Lake Chad also support thicker and taller fields of grasses.

Human activities such as burning of fields, chopping down trees, and overgrazing of cattle have exacerbated the problem of desertification in the Far North. In response, the Cameroonian government, with aid from various non-governmental organisations, has begun Operation Green Sahel. The project aims to reverse the effects of desertification by reintroducing trees to the region.

== Demographics ==
Historical population
Year	Pop.	±% p.a.
1976	1,394,765	—
1987	1,855,695	+2.63%
2005	3,111,792	+2.91%
2015	3,993,007	+2.52%

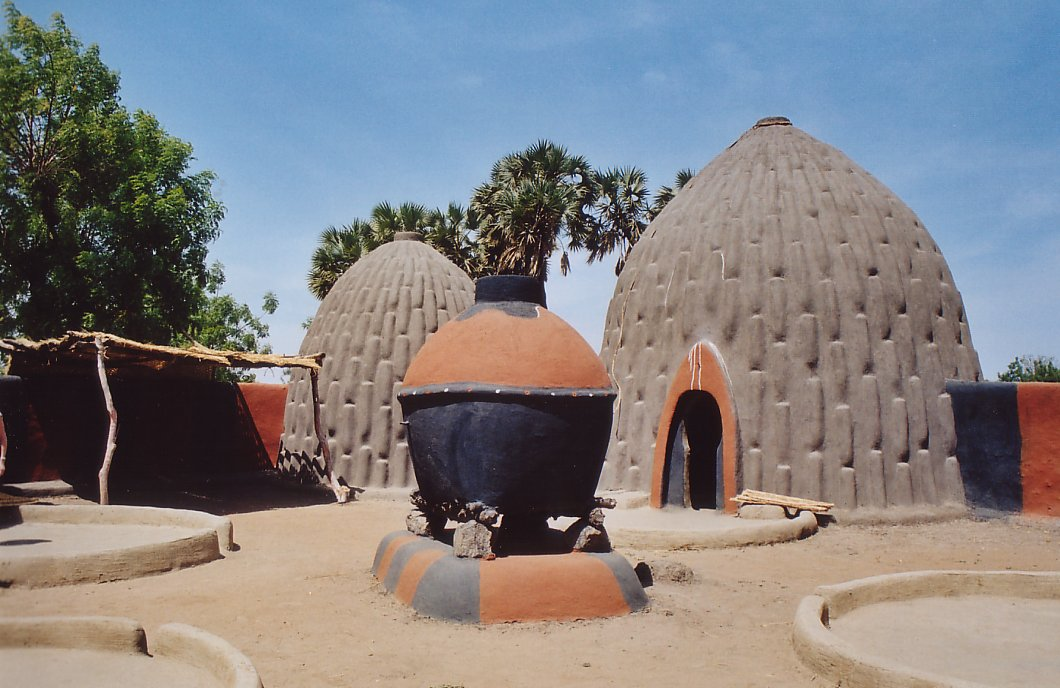
Musgum dwelling unit

=== Settlement patterns ===
In larger towns and cities, such as Maroua, houses tend to follow the modern model of concrete walls and metal roof. Though house construction differs from people to people, the most common type is a small building with a small entryway under a conical roof covered in palm leaves or thatching. Builders make walls from locally available materials, so the Matakam use stone, the Fulani use clay, and the Guizigi weave walls of straw. The head of a particular household or lineage often builds several small houses within a single, walled compound called a saré. These compounds tend to be built with the compound of the chief at their centre, and all houses have a granary nearby, as the long dry season prevents year-round food cultivation. Concentric farms surround the settlement, these surrounded by hedges to keep livestock away. Bororo Fulani are primarily nomadic, though they do establish some semi-permanent settlements for the old or infirm.

The province is Cameroon's fourth most densely populated, with 1,855,695 people and an average of 54 inhabitants per km^{2}. Most of this population lives in the corridor between Maroua, which has 214,000 inhabitants, and Mokolo. Another area of high density is the Mandara Mountains, a legacy of the Fulani conquest of the past, in the Diamaré plain, and at the Logone-Chari confluence and up to Lake Chad. The remainder of the province is moderately populated, and the Logone valley and the Chari division are sparsely populated until about the level of Kousséri. Since independence, much of the Far North's population has been migrating to large population centres, particularly Maroua and Garoua.

=== People ===
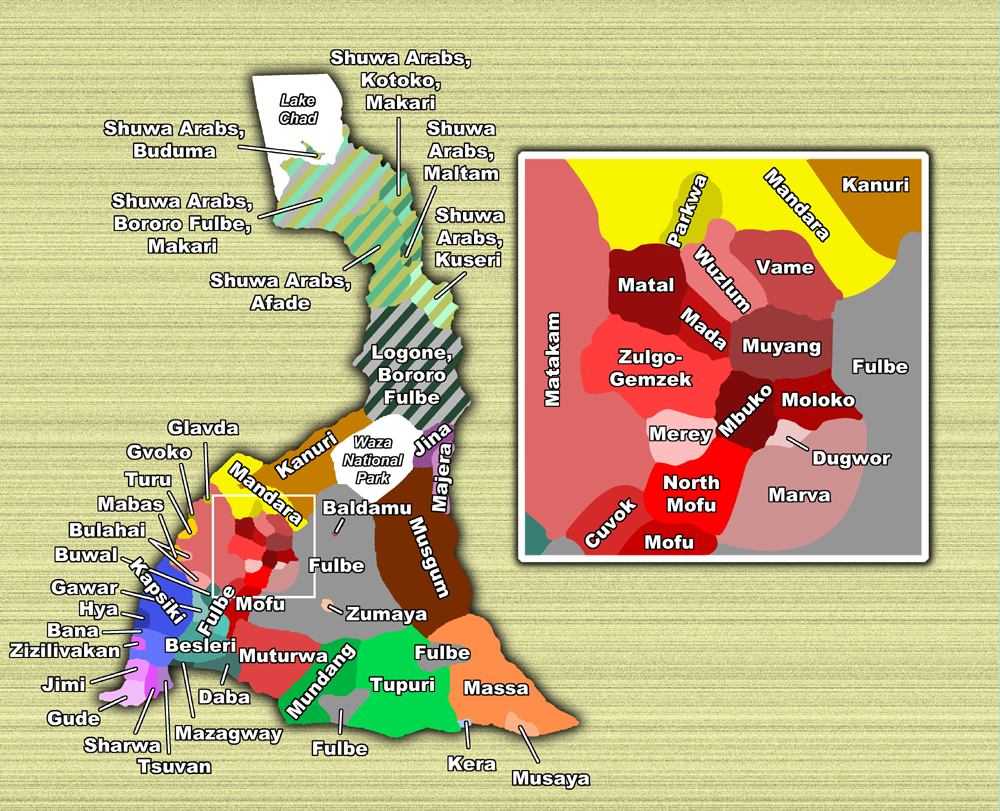
Locations of the various ethnic groups of the Far North Province

The Fulani (Fulbe) make up a large portion of the Far North's population. The heart of the province is primarily Fulani territory, and Maroua is mostly a Fulani settlement. They also occupy smaller pieces of land south of there, one along the border with Chad, and one to the southeast.
The Zumaya (sedentary Fulani group who reached the department of Diamare before the arrival of Massina Fulani) had first established their kingdom (Wouro-Laamorde) at Kalaki (Wouro Zangui). With the beginning of the Fulani jihad they joined the Massina Fulani to convert the Kirdi to Islam. The Bororo Fulani, tall, thin nomads with lighter complexions than their sedentary kin, drive herds of cattle through this region, though they also move through most of the northern strip of land between Nigeria and Chad, as well. The Fulani speak Fulfulde, a Senegambian language.

Adamawa-language speakers make up a smaller group, with about 169,700 members in the country in 1982. These are broken into the Mundang and the Tupuri, whose territories lie adjacent to one another on the southern border with Chad. The Kanuri, on the western border between Nigeria and Waza Park, are the sole speakers of a Nilo-Saharan language. They numbered about 56,500 individuals in 1982. Some 63,000 semi-nomadic Shuwa Arabs live in the north of the province up to Lake Chad.

More than 974,408 people in the province speak one of the various Chadic languages and thus comprise the plurality of the population. Many of these are Kirdi, (pagan in Fulfulde) peoples who refused to convert to Islam during the Fulani conquest of the 19th century. Many of these Kirdi today live in the province's mountainous western border, as this areas was more easily defensible against the Fulani invaders. The various Mandara peoples lie primarily in the Mandara Mountains along the border with Nigeria. The Mandarawa are furthest north with their base at Mora, and the Parkwa lie directly south of them. The Glavda and Gvoko lie southwest in smaller territories. Although not part of the Mandara group, the Turu people, Mabas, and Matakam live along the border with their capital at Mokolo. The Kapsiki, Hya, Bana, Zizilivikan, Jimi, and Gude occupy the remainder of the border from north to south. The Bulahai, Buwal, Gawar, Besleri, Sharwa, Tsuvan, and Mazagway lie just east of this border grouping. The southern border of the province is home to the Daba and Muturwa.

The territory between Maroua, Mokolo, and Tokombére is a major population centre, and over a dozen ethnic groups live in small areas there. These are the Matal, Wuzlum, Vame, Muyang, Mokolo, Dugwor, Marva, North Mofu, Mofu, Cuvok, Merey, Zulgo-Gemzek, Mada (Cameroon), and Mbuko.

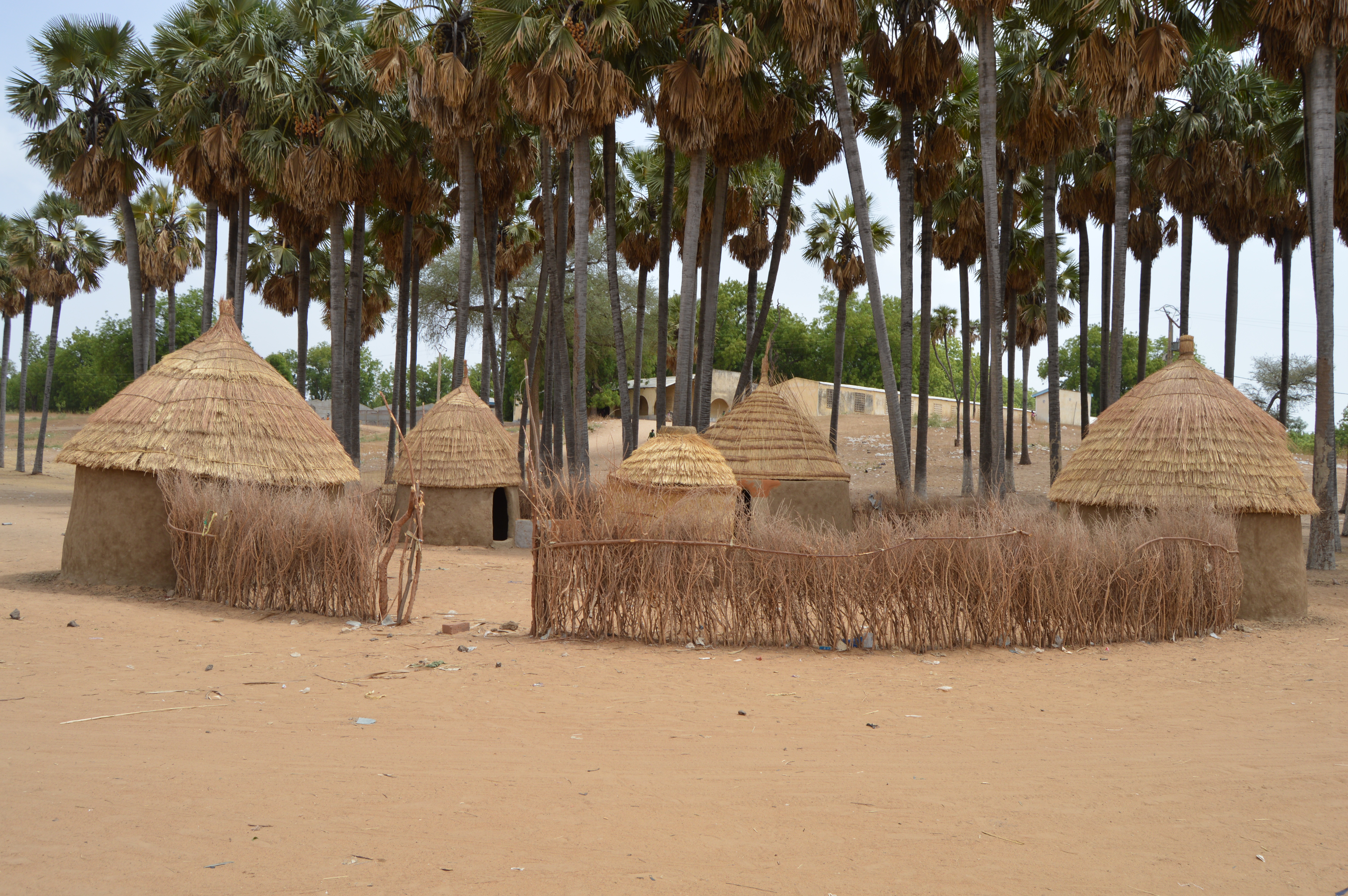
Housing unit in a village in Yagoua

The Buduma live on islands in Lake Chad north of Kotokoland. The various Kotoko peoples live in the strip between Nigeria and Chad. This group includes the Afade, Logone, Makari, and the Kotoko proper, and the Kuseri and Maltam. The Jina and Majera live south of Kotokoland, between Waza National Park and Chad. More distantly related groups include the Kera, with a small territory on the southern border with Chad, the Massa, who occupy the tip of the province's beak, including Yagoua, and the Musaya, on the Chad border at Dom village.

With the exception of the Fulani herders, most people in the Far North are subsistence farmers. Although predominantly Muslims, the province has a significant minority of a mixture of Christianity, and traditional religions. The Kirdi peoples resisted Islam in the 19th century, though today many of these have been Islamised and Christianised at least partially. However, most groups have converted more fully to Islam. The Fulani are dominant politically and religiously in the province.

==== Nigerian refugees ====
As of 30 October 2013, IRIN reports:

"There are 8,128 Nigerian refugees in Cameroon's Far North Region, but only 5,289 are registered by UNHCR ...

Many of the Nigerians who have fled into Cameroon prefer to stay with friends and family near the border areas.

The refugee population fleeing from Boko Haram are scattered in very inaccessible localities in the north of Cameroon, and many who refuse to be registered and stay in camps are still at the mercy of the [Boko Haram] sect and are seen as threat to local security".

=== Agriculture ===
Sustenance farming serves as the primary occupation for most Far North residents. Crops vary from area to area. Far to the south, planters may raise root crops such as manioc, but as one moves north, cereals dominate. Maize is found in the strip between Chad and Nigeria. Groundnuts are in Maroua and northwest and in the Mandara Mountains. The seasonal flooding of the Logone River and Mayo Tsanaga supports large fields of rice. Millet and sorghum grow all over, though millet tends to grow better than sorghum in arid conditions. Cotton is common, especially in the Diamaré Plain, though it grows poorly in the swampy Logone valley. Beans are also common.

Village farmers typically sow in concentric circles around the farm. Hedges surround the farm to keep away animals. Farming tools are typically simple hoes, sickles, knives, and machetes. Farmland is burnt during the dry season, then crops are planted at the first rains. These farms can be quite extensive, as in the Mandara Mountains area. Here, farms climb up the mountain slopes in terraces held in place by stones.

Rice is the primary moneymaker for farmers in the Logone valley. This is largely due to the Rice Expansion and Modernisation Company of Yagoua (SEMRY), which operates some 129 km^{2} of rice fields. Elsewhere, cotton is the most lucrative cash crop. Both textiles and oil come from the cotton.. Société du Développement du Coton (SODECOTON) is the main government body working to improve cotton yields in the region.

The Bororo Fulani and Shuwa Arabs both live principally as cattle raisers. Bororo herds roam much of the Far North and often wind up far south for sale in Yaoundé or Douala. Other ethnic groups are today becoming more involved in cattle raising. Horses and donkeys are common in the province, although these are usually employed as beasts of burden. Farmers also raise sheep and goats. Animal husbandry is less prevalent in the Far North than in the North and Adamawa Provinces, however, as the arid conditions make watering large animals difficult and large population centres make fields scarce. Maroua has emerged as an important centre for animal raisers, with both a cattle market and a veterinary centre.

Fishing is an important way of life for the peoples who live along Lake Chad. The Kofia Islands are home to the Budumu and to fishermen from Cameroon, Chad, and Nigeria, most of whom earn their living in this fashion. The Logone is also heavily fished.

=== Industry and infrastructure ===
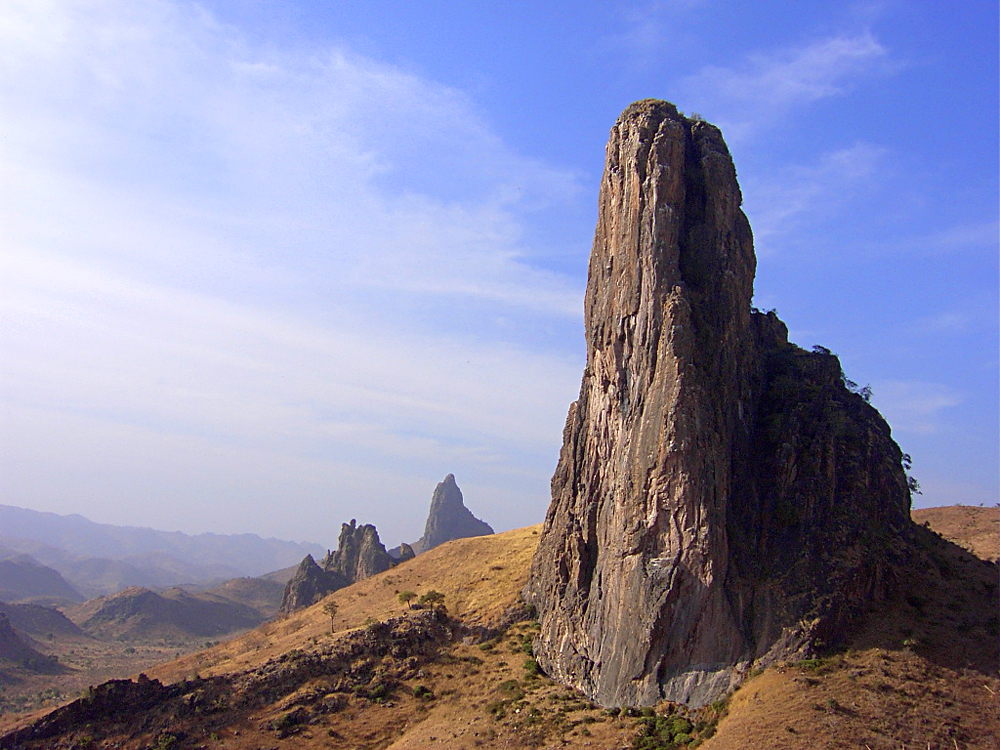
Rhumsiki Valley, one of Cameroon's most popular tourist attractions.

What little industry the north has mostly falls into the realm of handicrafts. Much of this revolves around cattle and related products, particularly in Maroua. This city is home to many tanneries, leatherworking, and embroidery and metalworking. Maroua even has a beef cannery. Maroua also has a large artisanat, which sells handicrafts such as pottery, beads. SODECOTON Cotton gins operate in Guider, Mora, Mokolo, Maroua, Yagoua, and Kaélé. SODECOTON also operates cottonseed oil mills in Kaélé and Maroua. Rhumsiki and other communities are home to spinners and weavers, who work primarily with cotton. Rice processing forms the final prong of the province's industry. Much of this hulling is done through SEMRY in Yagoua. Limestone mining operates at Figuil, and CIMENCAM produces cement there.

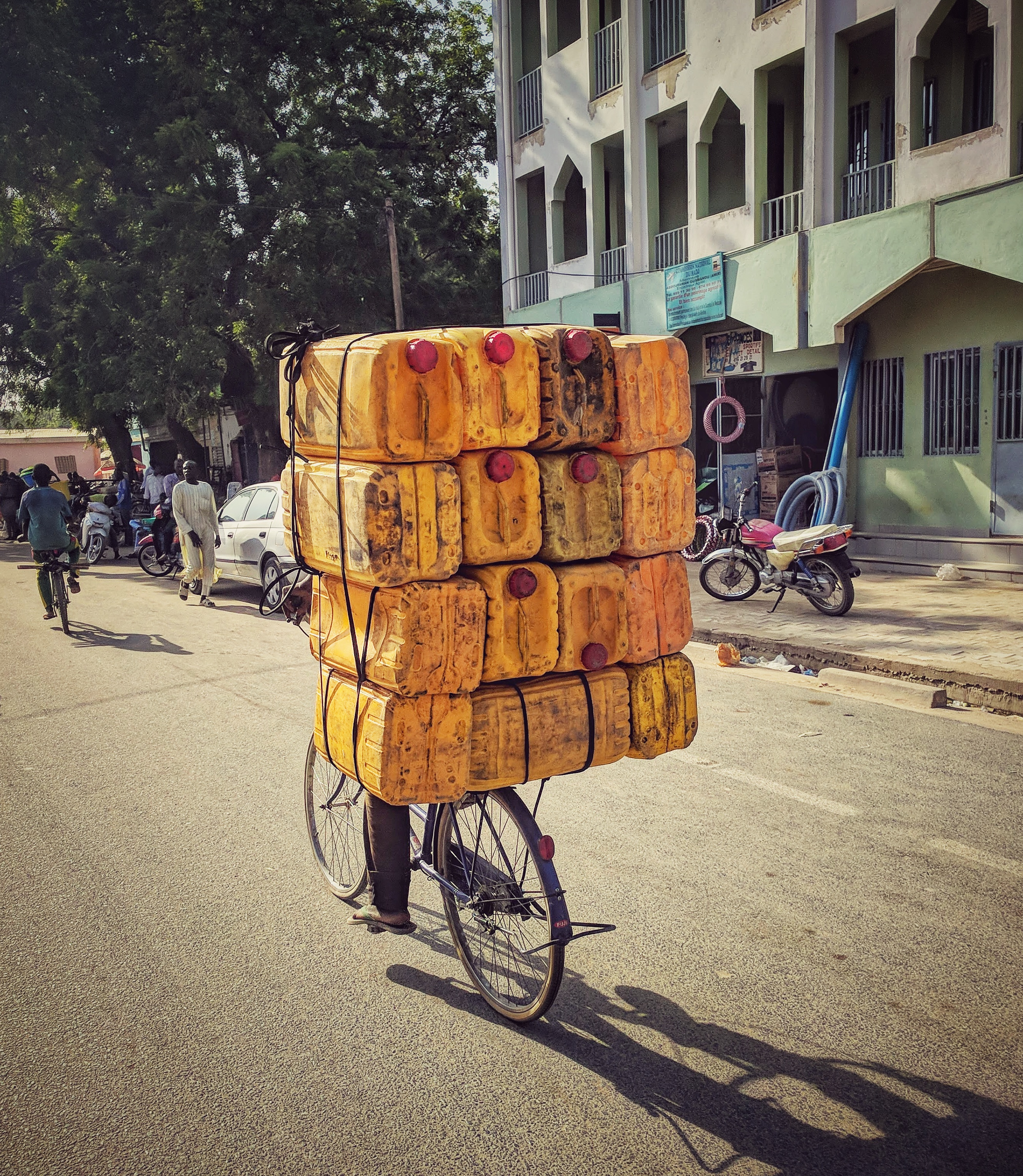
Fuel transportation by bicycle from Nigeria sold in Maroua, Far North

Three major roads service the Far North. National Road 1 enters the province from the south via Yaoundé and Maltam. It continues north and east through Mora and on toward Kousséri and then veers northwest into Nigeria. This road is tarred as far north as Kousséri. National Road 12 handles traffic between Maroua and Yagoua, and National Road 14 goes between Mora west to Nigeria via Kerawa. The stretches between Maroua and Kousséri, Maroua and Mokolo, and Maroua south to Garoua are tarred. Away from these more travelled thoroughfares, roads in the Far North are unpaved and can be quite rough. This is particularly true in the Mandara Mountains, where large stones litter the roadway. Motorcycles are often one of the few options for travel to more remote destinations. These vehicles also serve as the primary taxi service in town. Access to petrol is another problem, as supplies often run out during the rainy season. Merchants often hike or bicycle into Nigeria to obtain cheaper fuel there for resale in Cameroon. A major obstacle to road travel in recent years is increased road banditry.

Buses service the more traveled destinations, especially the road south from Maroua to Garoua. Smaller destinations are reachable by bush taxi or privately hired motorcycle drivers. Motorcycle taxis are the primary means of travelling about in the large towns. Travel on the open road has in recent years been curtailed by increases in road banditry. These outlaws often ambush buses or bush taxis and rob all passengers. Air travel is another possibility within the Far North, and airstrips operate in Koza, Méri, Waza, Yagoua, and Kaélé. Maroua has a regional airport. Riverain transport is possible along the Logone and Chari Rivers during rainy season.

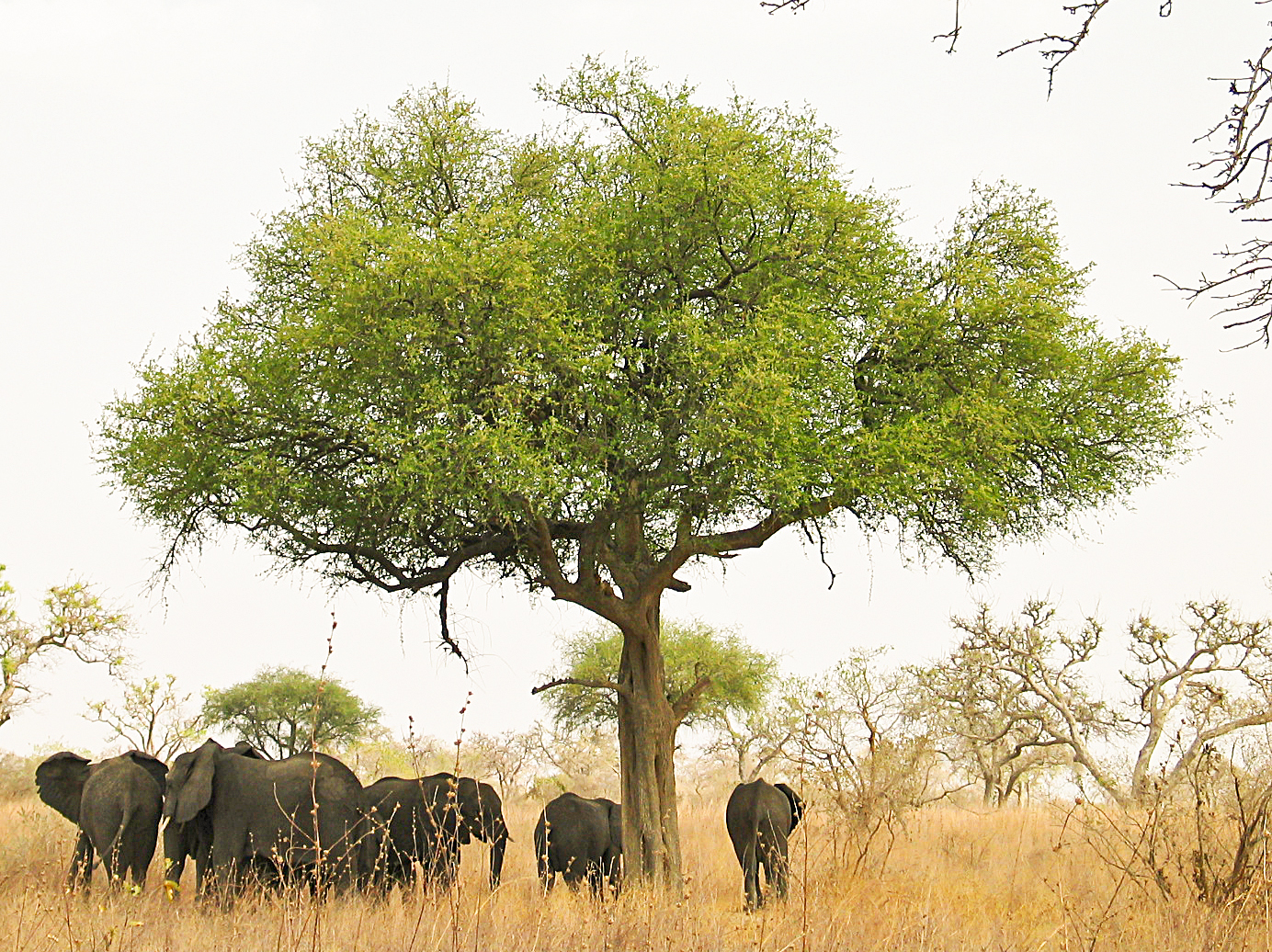
Elephants in Waza National Park

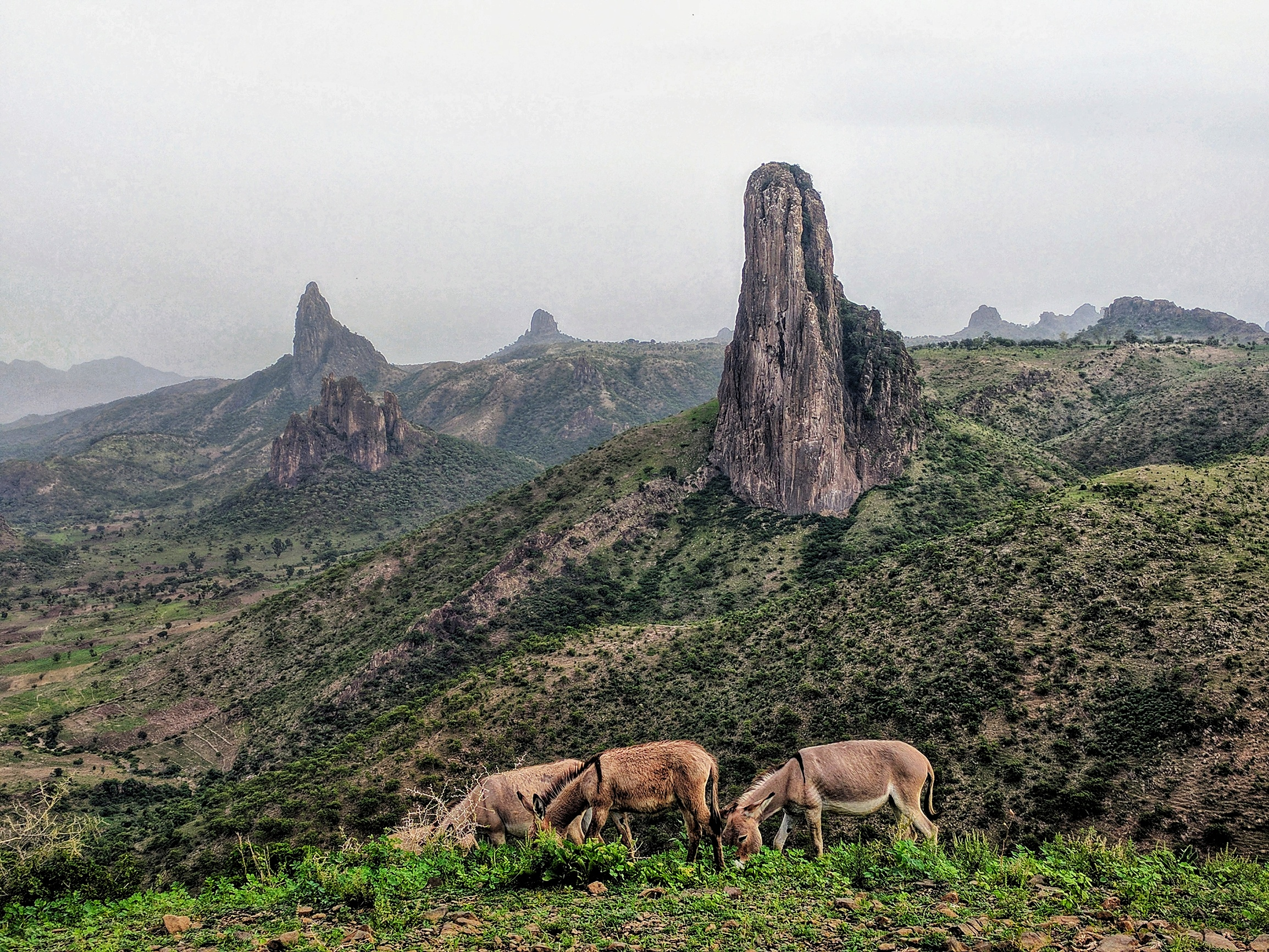
Kapsiki mountains

The Far North is home to many of Cameroon's most popular tourist destinations. Waza National Park is the pre-eminent wildlife park in Cameroon. The wildlife there is relatively easy to see, and, of Cameroon's wildlife parks, Lonely Planet names it "the best for viewing wildlife", and Rough Guides calls it the "probably the best site for savannah game viewing in West Africa".

Another of the Far North's draws is the picturesque scenery. Dozens of small villages dot the province, and each of these provides its own unique draws for the tourist. Oudjilla has a picturesque chief's compound, and Tourou is renowned for the fact that the women there wear hats made from calabashes, which convey details such as marital status. The Mandara Mountains are another major draw, as they offer hiking and striking views. This is most evident at Rhumsiki, where the "much photographed" Rhumsiki Peak is located. The village of Rhumsiki is today something of a tourist trap, because, as Hudgens and Trillo put it, "[w]herever you look, the scenery is breathtaking."

== Administration and social conditions ==
The Far North is very much divided between Muslim and non-Muslim. This manifests in the form of prejudice against non-Muslims, especially in rural areas. Moreover, the Kirdi groups remain disadvantaged socially, educationally, and economically. Human rights organisations cite Fulani lamibe (traditional rulers) as enjoying great leeway from the government, which allows them to keep private prisons and administer justice as they see fit. Government prisons are no better, especially those given over to holding suspected road bandits.

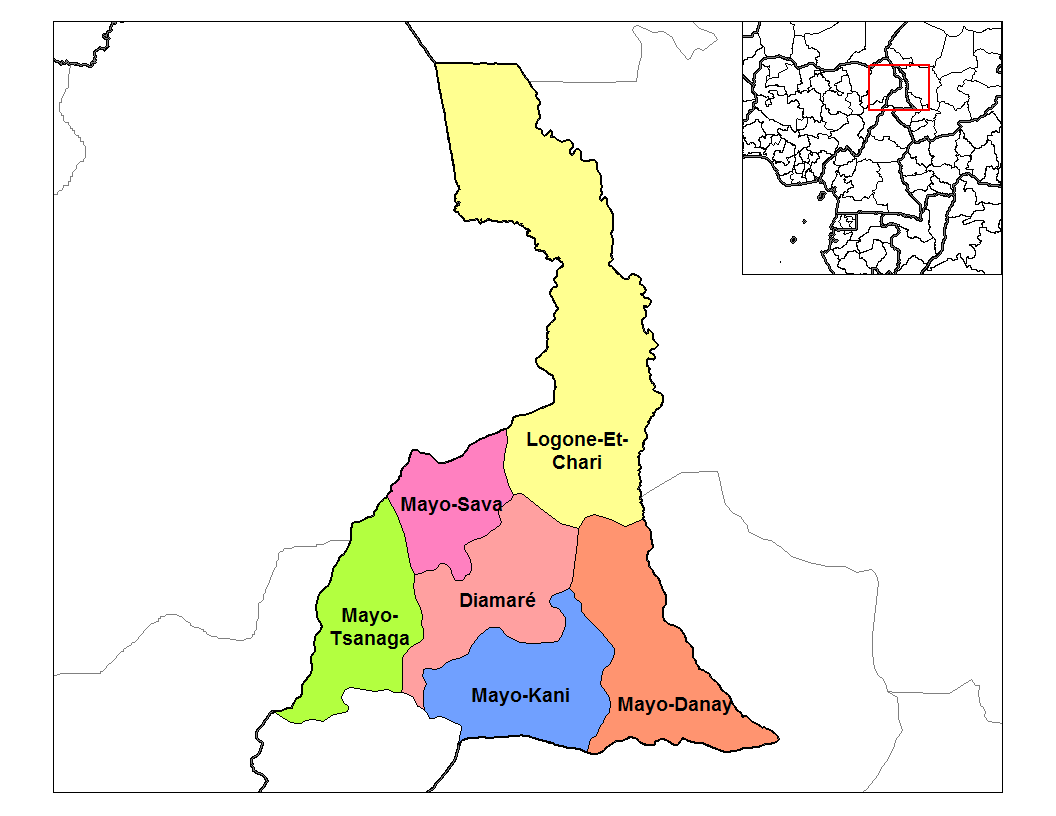
Departments of Far North Cameroon

The province is divided into six departments (departements):

1. Diamaré, with its capital at Maroua
2. Logone-et-Chari, with its capital at Kousséri
3. Mayo-Danay, with its capital at Yagoua
4. Mayo-Kani, with its capital at Kaélé
5. Mayo-Sava, with its capital at Mora
6. Mayo-Tsanaga, with its capital at Mokolo

These are in turn broken down into subdivisions. Presidentially appointed senior divisional officers (prefets) and subdivisional officers (sous-prefets) govern each respectively.

Traditional leaders, usually referred to as chiefs in English, often preside over particular ethnic groups or villages; nevertheless, many of these wield very little power today, the chiefs' compounds serving as little more than tourist attractions. In contrast, traditional Fulani leaders, known as lamibe, retain much of their influence.

In the 1990s, politics in the region was dominated by the National Union for Democracy and Progress (Union nationale pour la démocratie et le progress, UNDP) with its large base of Fulani supporters. The UNDP is largely Fulani-based today, but the ruling Cameroon People's Democratic Movement (CPDM) party is careful to address Fulani interests.

The Far North has few hospitals. These are located in Mokolo, Maroua, Logone-Birni, Bini, Kousséri, and Waza. Furthermore, many of the inhabitants cannot afford Western medicines. Three cholera outbreaks have occurred in the Far North since 2010, in 2010, 2011, and 2014, as sanitation and access to clean drinking water became more difficult due to extended drought conditions.

Each ethnic group in the province celebrates its own traditional festivals and holidays. Among the Fulani, the chief among these are Ramadan and the Feast of the Ram. Other notable festivals include the Cock Festival of the Tupuri. During the ritual, the nephew of the head of a family kills a cock and throws its head into the fire. The head is said to always land on its right side. The Dance of the Cock is another Tupuri affair. A museum of local art is in Maroua, which houses Sao, Tupuri, Musgum, and Fulani artefacts.

== History ==
=== Early empires ===
Evidence of human habitation has been found in the Chad basin and at sites near Maroua and Mokolo. The Paleo-Sudanese peoples are the earliest known inhabitants of the territory. The arrival of Neo-Sudanese groups from the east and west forced the Paleo-Sudanese into the Mandara Mountains. The Shuwa Arabs, descendants of Banu Hilal deported from the Fatimid Caliphate in Egypt, arrived from the northeast and settled around Lake Chad in the 15th century.

Archaeological finds attest to the existence of the Sao culture in the Logone valley and around Lake Chad as early as the 5th century. Little is known about the Sao, except that they were copper and ironworkers and, legend says, fearsome giants. Legends of later peoples claimed that the Sao were descendants of the Hyksos who arrived in the area in several waves. Another theory makes them the original inhabitants of the Chad basin, traditionally an oasis to the north of the basin. They may have been of Nilotic origin. Even the span of their civilisation is in dispute, with various estimates putting their rise at some point between the 5th and 8th century and their fall between the 8th and 15th century. The prevailing opinion among scholars, however, dates them to no later than the 10th century. At this time, eastern invaders entered the Chad Basin and conquered them. The Sao likely disappeared through intermarriage with this and other groups. Many of the current ethnic groups in the Far North claim descent from the Sao.

The Kanem Empire, originated in the 9th century AD to the northeast of Lake Chad, and from there expanded in the region. Islam reached Kanem early, and the rulers converted in the 11th century. Kanem-Bornu strengthened as an Islamic stronghold, and the population converted as well. Embassies were traded with North African states, and trade increased. The rulers launched a series of conquests, culminating in Dunama Dabbalemi's (r. 1221–1259) expansion south as far south as the Adamawa Plateau. At this point, Kanem and its successor Bornu were active participants in trans-Saharan trade. Slaves in particular were frequently traded in exchange for horses and salt. The Kanem-Bornu Empire lasted until 1893, when the Sudanese warlord Rabih az-Zubayr overthrew it.

Other groups in the territory also formed kingdoms, such as that of the Kotoko. They were eventually split, as the northern Kotoko became a vassal state of the Kanem Empire, while the southerners paid tribute but remained mostly independent with their capital at Logone-Birni. This part of the kingdom would eventually be Islamicised as well.

The Mandarawa settled the Mandara Mountains in the 15th century. They coalesced into state, called Mandara. Over the next hundred years, they fought wars of expansion against their neighbours, eventually capturing Dulo, which would become their capital. Civil war erupted after this conquest, and an appeal was made to the ruler of Bornu in 1614 to settle it. The resulting settlement established Bornu as an important influence over Mandara. In 1715, King Boukar received three Muslim missionaries and converted to their faith. The Mandara would largely convert to Islam over the next 200 years. Boukar also ended Bornu influence in Mandara when he defeated a Bornu expedition sometime in the late 18th or early 19th century. He launched further conquests on neighbouring groups.

=== Fulani jihads ===
Fulani herdsmen migrated into the territory from the west beginning in the 13th century. The earliest of these settled as minorities in pre-existing population centres, but by the 17th century, Fulani-only settlements had been established. A conversion to Islam only strengthened Fulani identity, and by 1804, population pressures were driving Fulani herdsmen to seek new territory in which to lead their cattle. Usman Dan Fodio declared a jihad in what is now northern Nigeria and Cameroon, and Modibo Adama led the charge into the land of Fumbina, which included areas of the Far North.

Adama focused first on areas south. Then he turned his attentions toward the Mandara kingdom. Many soldiers who had fought Mandara in previous engagements in 1808 joined his ranks. Adama first attacked from the south and took Guider by 1810. He then took the Dulo, the Mandara capital, but the Mandarawa counterattacked and recaptured it. Bornu and Mandara allied against the Fulani invaders; meanwhile, several of Mandara's pagan vassal states rebelled. Bornu took advantage of Mandara's weakness and burnt Dulo. The Fulani took Bornu in 1845, and the weakened Mandarawa eventually fell to Fulani aggression in 1893. Adama took Maroua in battles from 1808 to 1813.

The Fulani eventually came to rule the territory, with the exceptions of Mandara, Kotoko, and various Kirdi ethnic groups that had fled to the mountains and swamps. The region had been depopulated by war, slavery, and disease. Adama set up government over this new Adamawa Emirate in Yola (present-day Nigeria), answering only to the sultan of the Sokoto Empire. The Mandara Mountains and the swampy confluence of the Logone and Chari rivers supported the highest population density, as many peoples had fled the Neo-Sudanese and Fulani invasions by taking refuge on higher ground. The region was part of a lamidat ruled from Maroua.

=== European contacts ===
The earliest Europeans to reach the territory were British explorers Hugh Clapperton, Dixon Denham, and Dr. Walter Oudney, who were exploring the Niger River. They crossed the Sahara Desert overland and reached Lake Chad in 1822. Denham then explored the lake while Clapperton and Oudney followed the Chari River. Denham accompanied the Bornu and Mandara army in its attack on Fulani in Mosfei, north of Maroua in April 1823. He was captured, but managed to escape as his Fulani captors argued over his clothing. Oudney died in 1823. Clapperton and Denham regrouped near the Mandara Mountains and returned to England in 1825. They published their adventures in 1826 as Narrative of Travels and Discoveries in Northern and Central Africa, 1822, 1823, 1824.

James Richardson led a British expedition to the Chad Basin in 1851. He was accompanied by Germans Heinrich Barth and Herman Overweg. Their goal was to explore the land south of Lake Chad. Richardson died at Lake Chad in 1851. The others arrived at the Mandara Mountains and then explored Uba, the northernmost Fulani settlement in the Adamawa Emirate then continued on to Yola. Overweg died in 1852, but by 1855, Barth was back in England, where he published Travels and Discoveries in North and Central Africa.

In 1865 to 1867, two German expeditions under Gerhard Rolfs and Gustav Nachtigal explored the Chad Basin and the Mandara Mountains. They noted the potential commercial benefits of the area to Germany. In 1868, Nachtigal returned, reaching Lake Chad basin in June 1870. He stayed three years as a guest of the Sultan of Bornu, noting the groups around and their relations to one another. He returned to Europe in 1875 and published a three-volume Sahara and Sudan in 1879.

=== Colonial administration ===
In 1884, Germany took nominal control over the territory. They sent an army north and met with Fulani resistance. With the fall of Tibati in 1899 under Captain Von Kamptz and Lieutenant Hans Dominik, the area was subdued. The region became part of the administrative units ruled from Garoua and Mora. Much of the local administration was left in the hands of the lamidos. The Germans placed the Wandala and the Kirdi under the jurisdiction of these Fulani rulers. In 1903, the German Resident at Maroua, Graff Fugger, was assassinated by Yerima Mustafa. The Germans invaded Maroua and set up another administrative unit there. The area was otherwise largely ignored, as the crops available were not as lucrative as the rubber and ivory found in the jungles to the south. The only real way to get in or out was along the Benue River, which travelled through British-controlled Nigeria.

In World War I, the French under General Aymerich attacked the German outpost at Kousséri. On 25 August 1914, Colonel C. H. P. Carter attacked Germans at Mora, but was repulsed after a two-day fight. Captain Von Reuben continued the resistance, but he succumbed to the Anglo-French allies eventually.

In February 1916, France became the colonial head of the area. The territory was placed in the Mora-Garoua administrative unit, headed at Garoua. France allowed the lamidos to keep their power, but it also overthrew any who refused to comply with French mandates. They set up independent Kirdi chiefdoms to discourage animosity between the Islamic and non-Islamic peoples in the territory. Missionaries began to arrive, setting up a Bible school at Yagoua and a printing press for religious literature in Kaélé. The French improved the roads and built an airstrip at Maroua. In 1931, they introduced a higher-yielding form of cotton. They also began SEMRY, a rice-growing project in the Logone-Chari swamplands.

The first Cameroonian premier of Cameroon, André-Marie Mbida, startled the Fulani of the area when he announced his Abong-Mbang Resolutions in 1957. One of these stated that northern French Cameroon was to be "democratised", which the lamidos read to mean that their power would be curtailed. The northern territories threatened to secede and join with Chad. Northerner Ahmadou Ahidjo and his Union Camerounaise party rejected the resolutions, and Ahidjo used the issue to gain leverage and replace Mbida as prime minister.

=== Post-independence ===
Cameroon was granted independence on 1 January 1960 with Ahmadou Ahidjo its president. Under his rule, SODECOTON was set up, as was the Société de Développement et d'Exploitation des Production Animales (SODEPA) set up to improve ranching in 1974. Another was SEMRY in 1971. Upon Paul Biya's accession to the presidency, Moussa Yaya was accused of stirring up the lamidos against him. The UNDP is a Fulani-based party, but the CPDM is careful to support their interests. In 1983, the Grand North was split into three provinces.

Border areas of the Far North have been affected by the Boko Haram insurgency spilling into Cameroon from neighboring Nigeria, resulting in the December 2014 Cameroon clashes. In January 2015, many schools in the Far North did not re-open after the Christmas vacation, and it was reported that "Thousands of teachers, students and pupils have fled schools located along the border due to bloody confrontations between the Cameroon military and suspected Boko Haram militants."

In December 2021, dwindling of water resources around Lake Chad led to clash between Arab Choa herders and Mousgoum and Massa farmers. The clash was started in border village of Ouloumsa and then spread to other part of the region. At least 44 people are dead, 111 injured, and 112 villages burned down with more than 100.000 people are displaced with at least 85.000 people fled to Chad. UNHCR, Médecins Sans Frontières, and Chadian Red Cross are deployed to assist the refugee. The situation are subsided after intervention from Cameroonian forces, but isolated incident have remained in the region.
