= Battle of Kouno =

1899 battle

- Part of the Rabih War (1899–1901)
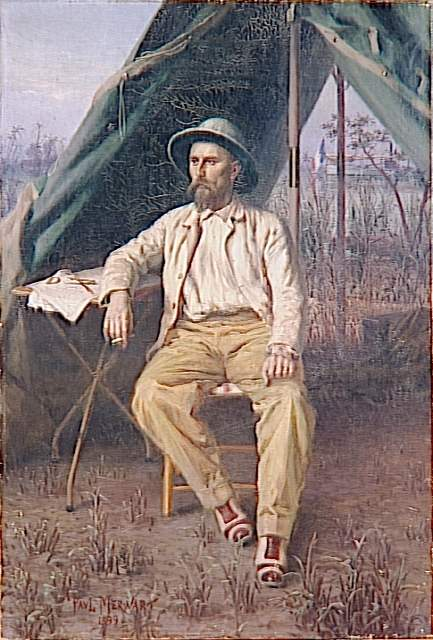
- Émile Gentil in Africa
Date	28 October 1899
Location	Kouno, near Sarh
Result	Stalemate

Belligerents
Kanem-Bornu Empire	France

Commanders and leaders
Rabih az-Zubayr	Émile Gentil

Strength
2,700 with firearms 10,000 auxiliaries	344 soldiers 5 cannons

Casualties and losses
High	46 killed 106 wounded

The battle of Kouno was an inconclusive battle that took place between French troops and the Muslim army led by Rabih az-Zubayr, in the context of French colonial expansion in Africa, and more precisely in Chad.

On August 16, 1899 the leader of the Gentil Mission, the Captain Émile Gentil, was informed of the utter annihilation by the warlord Rabih az-Zubayr of the Bretonnet-Braun Mission at Togbao on July 17.

Gentil knew that the Forreau-Lamy and Voulet missions were marching on southern Chad, respectively from Algeria and Niger. His primary goal was to unite his forces with those of the Voulet–Chanoine Mission; but first he felt he had to free himself of Rabih, and so left on October 23 Fort-Archambault, leaving only twenty men under the command of the maréchal de logis Bauguies. Gentil started navigating the Chari upriver, counting on three cannons, while the steamboat Léon-Blot and their barge had other two. A column formed by Cointet and Lamothe's men, under the command of the Captain Robillot, took instead the ground route marching close to the riverside.

On October 26 Gentil encamped himself near the hills of Togbao, at only 20 km from Rabih's forces, where he inspected the battlefield of the previous fight and united his forces with those of Robillot. On October 28 Gentil boarded most of his forces, and proceeded to Kouno that was first seen, at 9:00, and where Rabih was waiting Gentil; Rabih knew only of the arrival of the steamboat, while he had no knowledge of the three companies passing near the river.

Gentil immediately ordered the steamboat and the barge to open fire with their cannons; and at the same time, to the great surprise of Rabih's forces, the column proceeding by land did the same with its artillery. All the same they answered using their artillery, the three cannons won at Togbao, which they used with considerable ability. Rabih had also placed on the left a group of riflemen, whose rifle-fire also started to put Robillot's Senegalese tirailleurs in difficulty, moving Robillot to order a bayonet assault on Rabih's lines. Being the latter provided only of firearms, they escaped disorderly to Kouno.

The assault brought the French to the outskirts of Kouno, to which they set fire. They continued advancing, till they found themselves just before the fortifications of Kouno; here Rabih had assembled all his forces, that started a massive rifle-fire, supported by an artillery piece.

After three hours of battle had passed and it was 12:00, some of Rabih's men started yielding and escaping; and this ampliated when one of Rabih's chief lieutenants, Othman Cheiko, governor of Kousséri, was killed. Gentil ordered now to attack the palissade with a bayonet assault, that was repelled after hard fighting by Rabih in person with only a few hundred men still resisting around him.

The rifle-fire continued, but at 16:30 Gentil was forced to admit that he would never take the enemy fort that day. Gentil had suffered heavy casualties: 46 soldiers were dead, while 106 were wounded, almost half of his 344 men. Among the dead stood the maréchal de logis de Possel, while seriously wounded were the captain Robillot and the lieutenant Kieffer. Also Rabih had suffered important losses, and some of his bannermen had been killed, like Boubakar, Rabih's chief lieutenant.

After having passed the night near the fort, the following morning Gentil, after having verified that, apart from the human losses, the ammunition and the provisions were nearly ended, ordered the retreat to Fort-Archambault, where the French returned without problems.

The battle had proved inconclusive; Kouno had not been taken, and Rabih still remained the key obstacle to the French conquest of Chad. Both sides had suffered heavy losses, and for Gentil there was now little other choice than await the arrival of the Voulet-Chanoine and Fourreau-Lamy missions.
