= Rabih War =

1899–1901 war between France and the Kanem–Bornu Empire

- Part of the Scramble for Africa
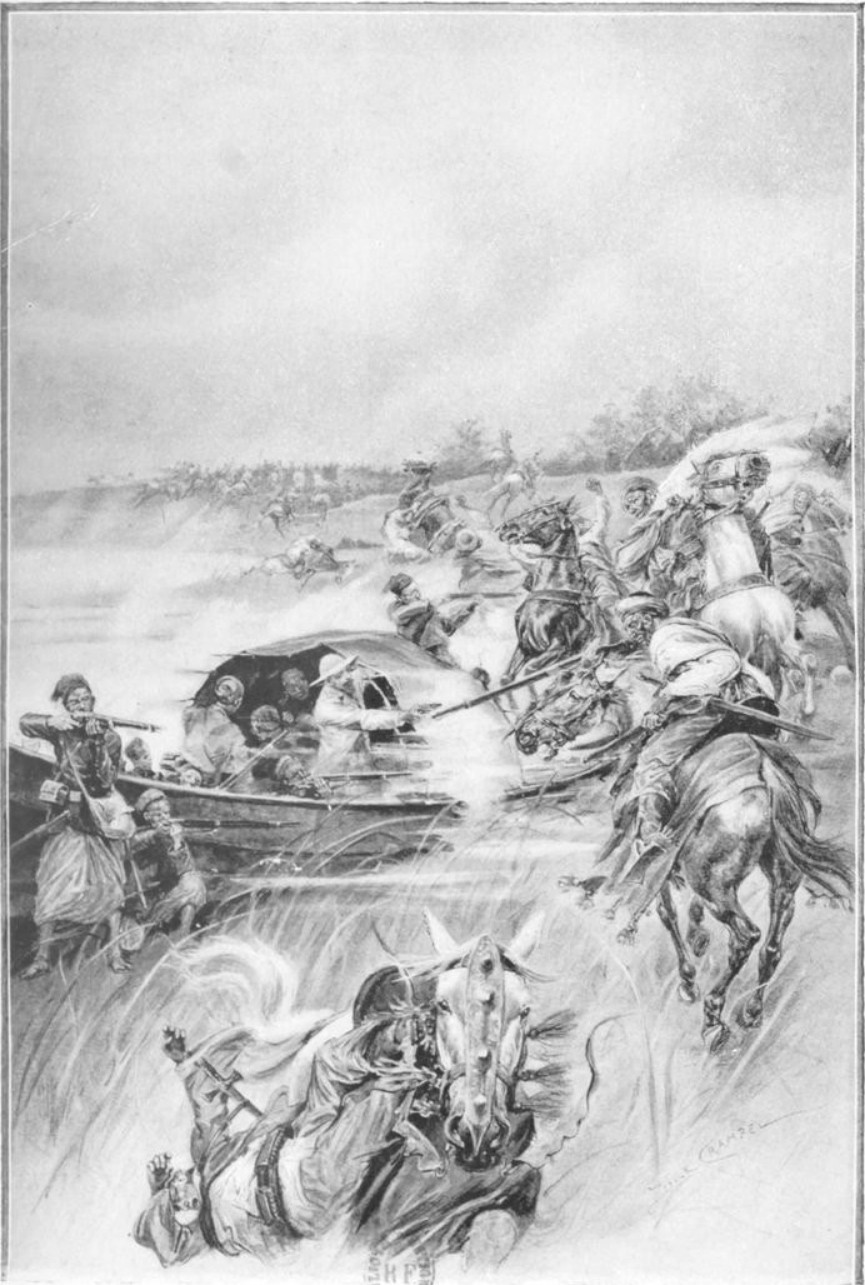
- Rabih az-Zubayr's forces attack a French party
Date	17 July 1899 – 23 August 1901 (2 years, 1 month and 6 days)
Location	Bornu (modern-day Nigeria and Chad)
Result	French victory: Restoration of the al-Kanemi dynasty; Beginning of the French colonisation of Chad

Belligerents
France; Sultanate of Bagirmi; Kanem–Bornu Empire (al-Kanemi loyalists)	Kanem–Bornu Empire (Rabih loyalists)

Commanders and leaders
Émile Gentil; Henri Bretonnet †; Amédée-François Lamy †; Solomon Braun †; Paul Joalland; René Reibell (DOW); Lt. Durand-Autier †; Félix Robillot; Georges Destenave; Gaourang II (WIA); Sanda Kura; Abubakar Garbai; Mestrema Musa †	Rabih az-Zubayr †; Fadlallah bin Rabih †; Muhammad Niebe; Hawwa

Strength
c. 700 (French) (Note: The number deployed at the battle of Kousséri, the largest French deployment in the war.); Thousands (Bagirmians and Bornuans)	c. 35,000 (Note: The approximate total number of soldiers stationed throughout Rabih's empire at the peak of his power.)

Casualties and losses
Hundreds	Thousands

The Rabih War (Note: French: Guerre de Rabah) (1899–1901) was a war fought between France and the Kanem–Bornu Empire, then ruled by the warlord Rabih az-Zubayr. Chiefly motivated by French colonial and economic interests in the Bornu region, France justified the campaign as being part of the struggle against the African slave trade. France was supported in the war by the Sultanate of Bagirmi and by Bornuans who remained loyal to the al-Kanemi dynasty, which had been deposed by Rabih.

Rabih defeated an initial French force, led by Henri Bretonnet, at the battle of Togbao in 1899. After the French increased their efforts and resources, Rabih was defeated and killed at the battle of Kousséri in 1900. The French installed Sanda Kura, an al-Kanemi dynast, as the new ruler of the Kanem–Bornu Empire but the war continued against Rabih's son, Fadlallah. Fadlallah made repeated attempts to regain Bornu and tried to secure British support for his claims but was ultimately defeated and killed at the battle of Gujba in 1901.

== Background ==
During the Scramble for Africa in the late 19th century, the region of Bornu (today largely located in northeastern Nigeria) was of interest to several European powers. France and Britain in particular sought to designate different "spheres of influence" in Africa. In the 1890s, representatives from France and Britain attempted to sign treaties with the shehu (ruler) of the Kanem–Bornu Empire which they could use to justify territorial claims in the region during their own negotiations. France was interested in Bornu due to wishes to territorially link existing French colonies in Senegal, Algeria, and Congo. In 1892, the French explorer Parfait-Louis Monteil secured French diplomatic relations with Kanem–Bornu.

By the time the French sought to make use of their diplomatic relationship with the shehu, Bornu had fallen to the Sudanese warlord and conqueror Rabih az-Zubayr. Rabih conquered the Kanem–Bornu Empire in 1893–1894, when he deposed the empire's ruling al-Kanemi dynasty. Rabih's rise to power in Bornu marked the first time the empire came under foreign control in its long history and his government took the form of a brutal military dictatorship.

Rabih's first encounter with the French was in 1891, before his conquest of Bornu, when Rabih's lieutenant Muhammad al-Sanussi massacred a French expedition led by Paul Crampel in the Dar al Kuti region. Rabih's forces left that region soon thereafter to avoid provoking a French response. France remained unaware of Rabih and his activities until 1893. Rabih's empire was a threat to colonial boundaries and spheres of influence agreed upon in negotiations between France, Britain, and Germany. Whereas Britain chose to deem Rabih a legitimate ruler of Bornu, France deemed him illegitimate since conquests of parts of his empire could then be justified. To the French, Rabih's rule over Bornu represented control over yet-to-be secured French territory and was an impediment to trade interests in the area.

French propaganda highlighted Rabih's state as a brutal slave economy and the struggle against the African slave trade was appropriated as justification for the military operation.

== Course of the war ==
=== Phase I: Rabih az-Zubayr ===
In 1896, France initiated the preparations for military confrontation with Rabih. An expedition led by Émile Gentil was sent from Brazzaville with the mission to secure the lands around Lake Chad. The advance guard of Gentil's expedition, led by Henri Bretonnet, reached Rabih's territory in July 1899 and entered into the Kanem–Bornu Empire with the claimed justification of aiding the Sultanate of Bagirmi against Rabih's aggression. On 17 July 1899, Bretonnet and his forces, bolstered by a Bagirmi force led by Gaourang II of Bagirmi, engaged Rabih's forces at the battle of Togbao. Rabih successfully repelled Bretonnet's attack and massacred the French forces. Bretonnet himself was killed, alongside several other officers. In October 1899, Rabih captured and executed the French explorer Ferdinand de Béhagle, in retaliation for French actions against his him.

The defeat at Togbao only increased French determination to defeat Rabih, and the French increased their forces in the operation. In late 1899, a French expedition led by Amédée-François Lamy was on the way through Bornu to join with Gentil's forces when they encountered Sanda Kura, a dynast of the al-Kanemi dynasty, and a few hundred followers. Lamy agreed to support Sanda Kura as the legitimate shehu of Bornu and he was invested as such in front of a jubilant crowd on 14 January 1900. In February/March, the joint French–Bornuan force led by Lamy crossed the Chari River and captured Kousséri, a fortress held by Rabih. Gentil's expedition arrived on 20 April and Gentil was put in charge as the local administrator. Gentil placed Lamy in charge of the French military operation against Rabih.

Rabih's seat of power in Bornu, Dikwa, was within the agreed-upon German sphere of influence. Legal justification to invade these territories was obtained by Sanda Kura exchanging letters with Gaourang of Bagirmi, who was made to write to ask for assistance against Rabih's aggression. The French–Bornuan–Bagirmian force was led by Lamy three miles further into Rabih's territory, where they attacked the fortress of Lakhta. The ensuing battle, the so-called battle of Kousséri (22 April 1900), saw the deaths of both Lamy and Rabih.

=== Phase II: Fadlallah bin Rabih ===
The death of Rabih did not end the conflict, as he was swiftly succeeded at Dikwa by his son Fadlallah bin Rabih. Fadlallah soon fled from Dikwa with an army numbering about 5,000 and the town was shortly thereafter occupied by the French, who installed Sanda Kura as ruler there. Fadlallah's second-in-command was his brother, Muhammad Niebe. Fadlallah's sister Hawwa is also recorded to have commanded soldiers during the war. On 31 April, a French force attacked Fadlallah's camp at Dagumba. The battle of Dagumba lasted less than an hour and was disastrous for Fadlallah. Fadlallah retreated in the direction of the Mandara Kingdom, where he was again attacked by the French on 9 May. In the ensuing battle of Isege, the French under René Reibell won an overwhelming victory as Fadlallah fled, reportedly accompanied by only 200 men. Fadlallah fled from Bornu entirely and rebuilt his forces, again commanding an army of about 5,000 by late May or early August. Fadlallah attempted to secure support from Britain and was offered protection while in British territory but no further aid. In October, Fadlallah learnt that the French had replaced Sanda Kura with Abubakar Garbai as shehu, and that Dikwa had been left largely undefended.

In November, Fadlallah returned to Bornu. Abubakar Garbai had sent an army led by the eunuch Mestrema Musa to occupy Maiduguri, which was inside the recognised British sphere of influence. On 26 November, Fadlallah occupied Maiduguri first after a rapid march and surprise-attacked Mestrema Musa at the battle of Maiduguri. Following a resounding victory, Fadlallah had Maiduguri burnt and marched on Dikwa, which he recaptured without a fight on 30 November. Abubakar Garbai and most of Dikwa's population had fled northeast to Ngala. The French faced difficulties in consolidating their forces to respond to Fadlallah's return. Fadlallah pursued Abubakar Garbai to Ngala, where he defeated the shehu at the battle of Ngala on 6 December. Survivors of Abubakar Garbai's forces were scattered or captured, and Ngala was burnt. The French renewed their campaign under Félix Adolphe Robillot, who recaptured Dikwa (abandoned by Fadlallah) on 31 December. Robillot's cavalry reached Fadlallah and Muhammad Niebe's forces and engaged them at the battle of Buni (10 January 1901), where Fadlallah scored a significant victory and then continued to travel southwest, eventually leaving Bornu again.

Fadlallah returned to Bornu in June and hoped to achieve British support in recapturing Dikwa and being recognised as the legitimate ruler of Bornu. In early August, a French force commanded by Georges Destenave advanced against Fadlallah. Fadlallah ordered a retreat to the town of Gujba, reached by the advance guard of the French army on 23 August. Fadlallah was killed at the ensuing battle of Gujba. His army was scattered and his siblings Muhammad Niebe and Hawwa soon surrendered to the French.

== Aftermath ==
Rabih was one of the last major opponents of the French colonial empire and French victory in the Rabih War paved the way for the colonisation of Chad. Although the al-Kanemi dynasty had been restored in Bornu, they governed under French and British colonial suzerainty. The territory of the Kanem–Bornu Empire had fallen completely under colonial control in 1902.
