= Victor Huot (cartographer) =

French cartographer (1867–1915)

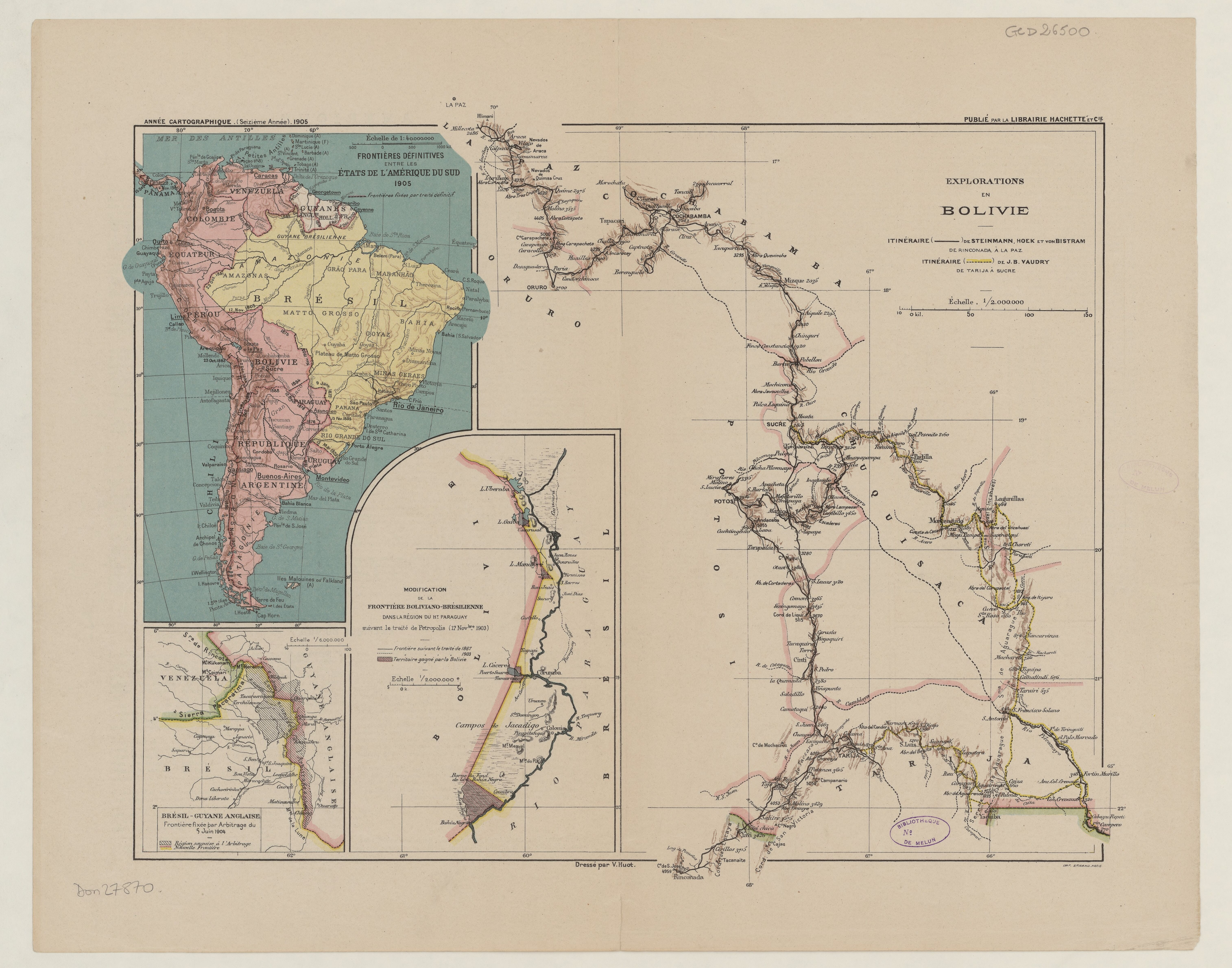
Explorations in Bolivia map of Gustav Steinmann, H. Hoek and Von Bistram expedition

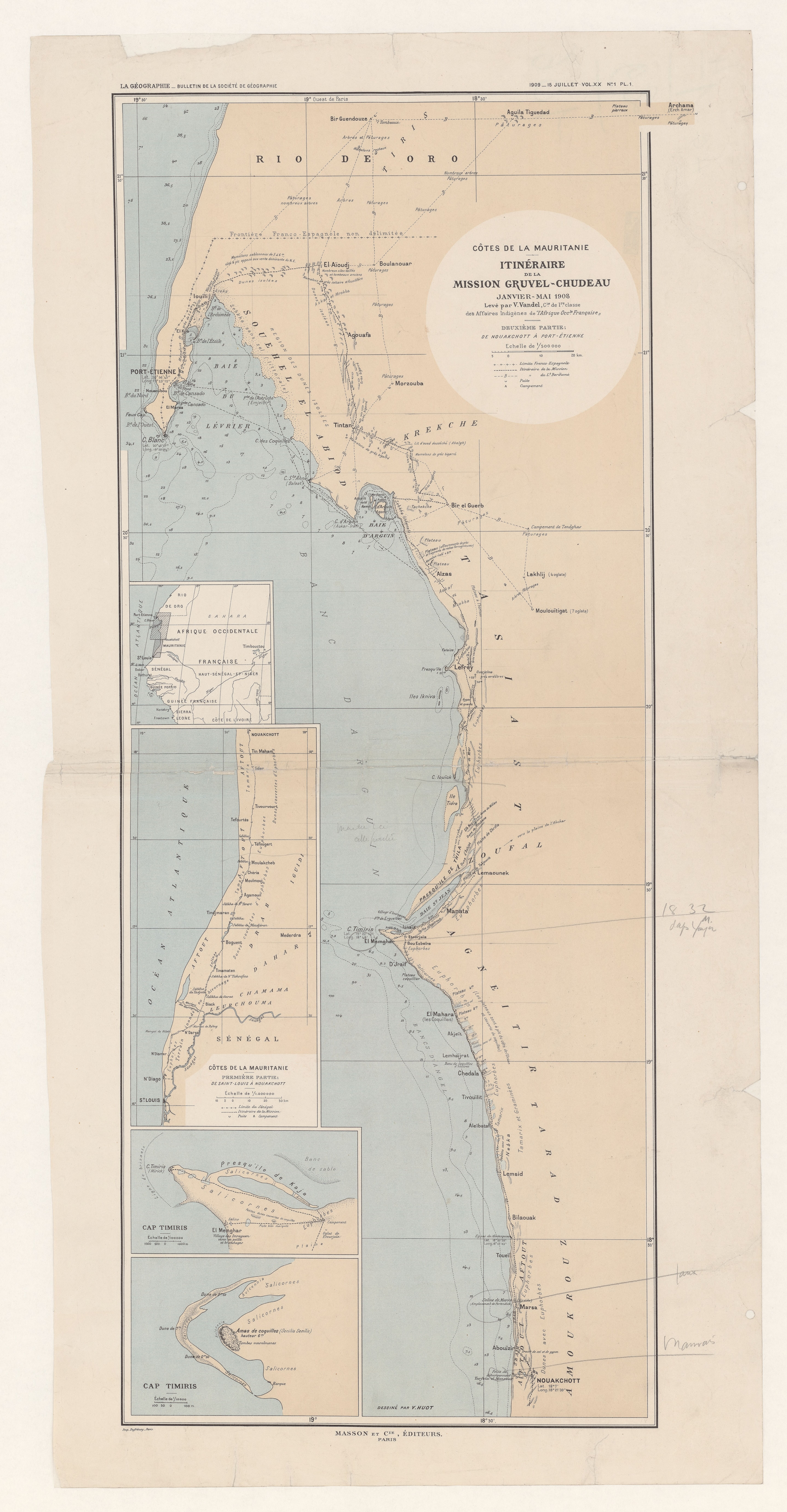
Coasts of Mauritanis map drawn by Huot from survey by V. Vandel (Itinerary of the Jean Abel Gruvel – René Chudeau mission, January-May 1908)

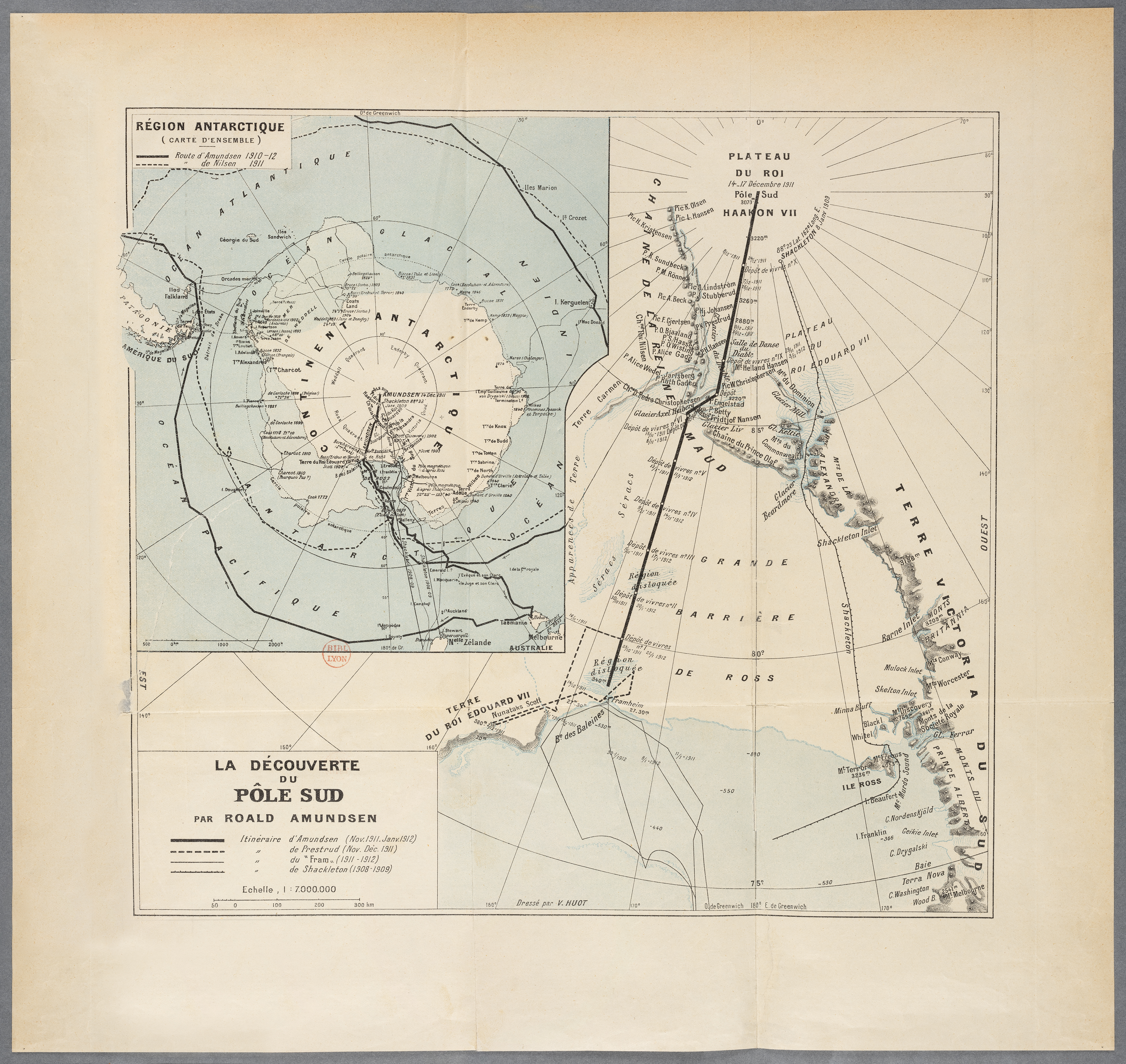
Map of Roald Amundsen's exploration of the South Pole

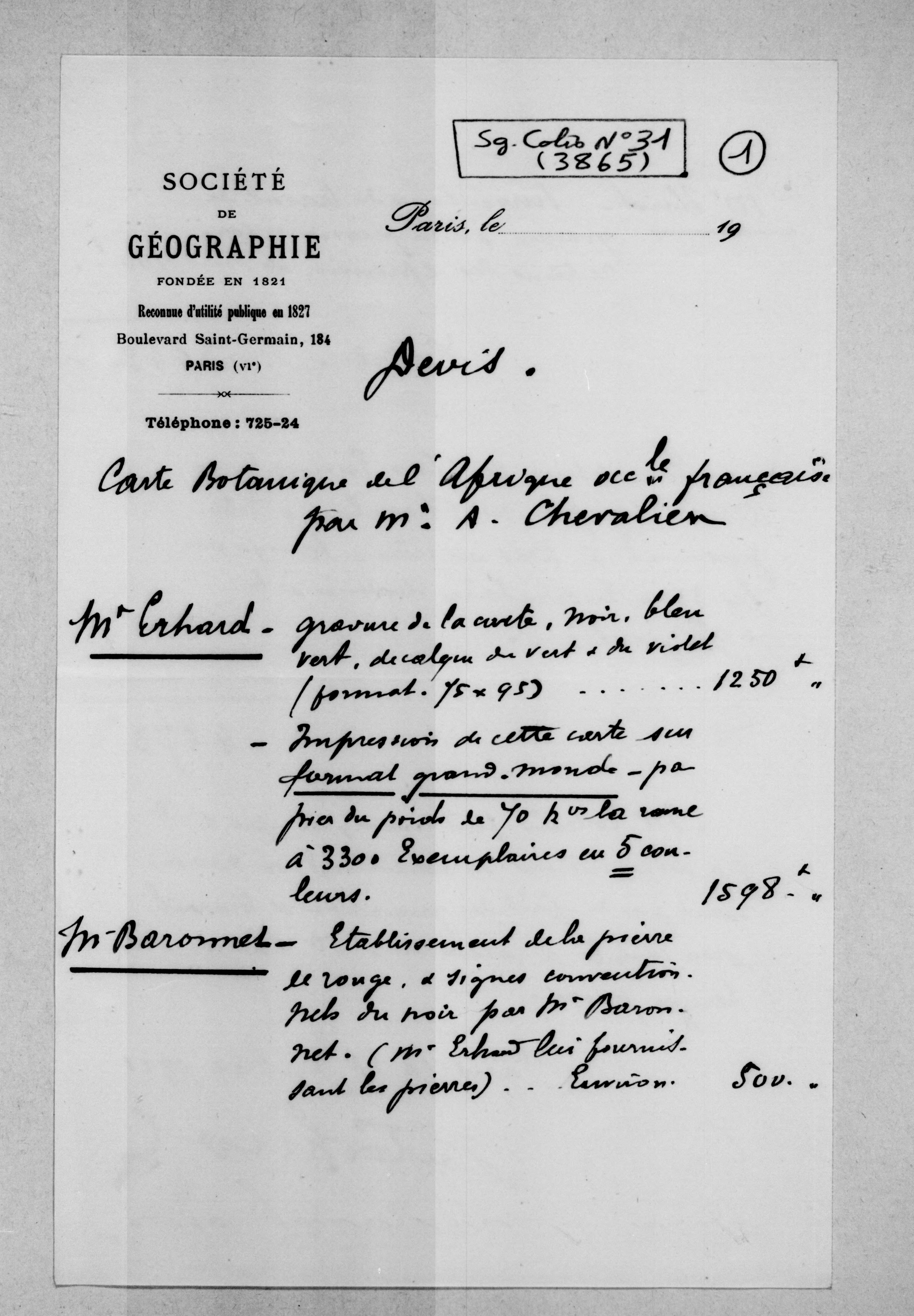

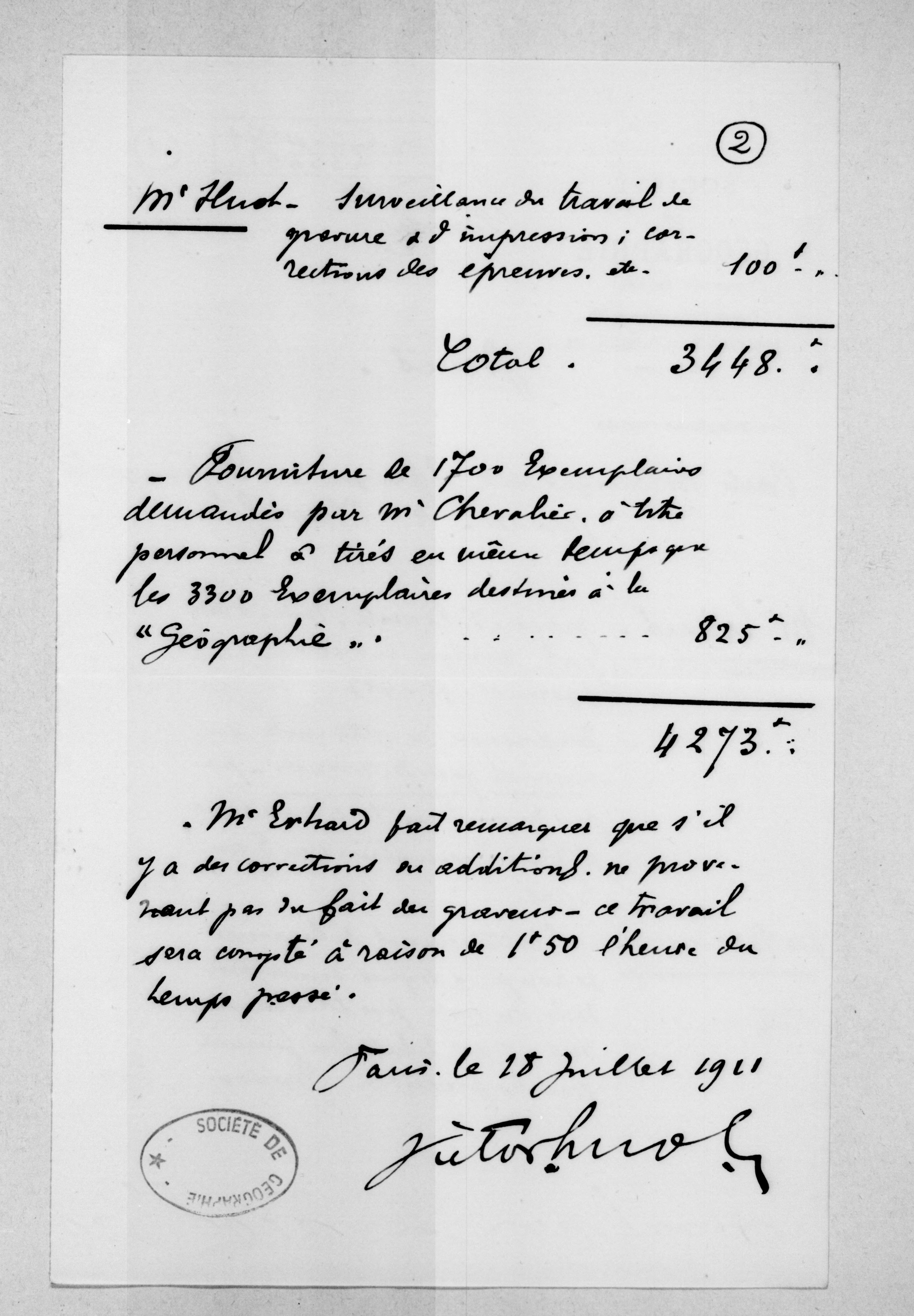

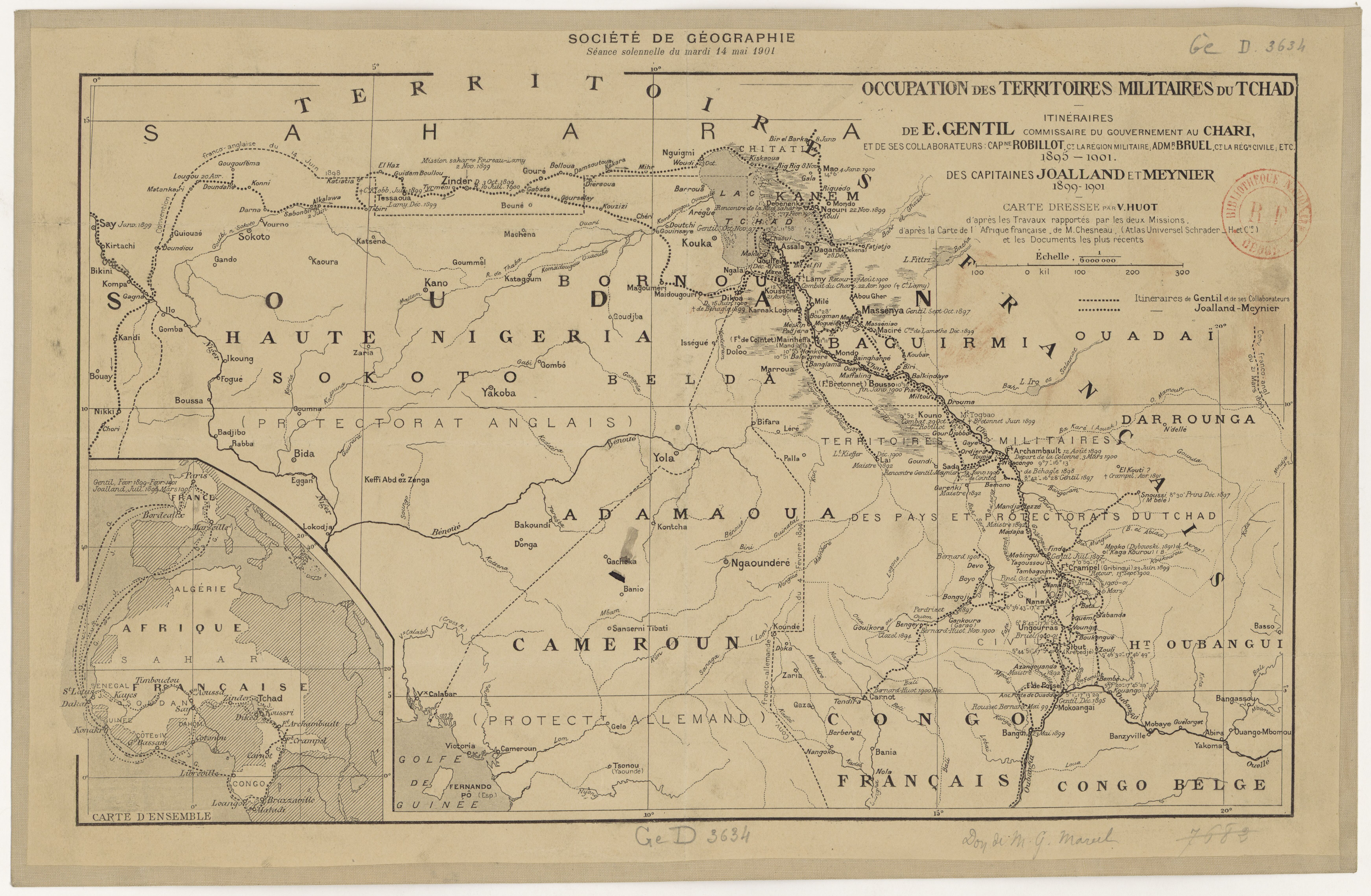
Occupation of the military territories of Chad. Itineraries of Émile Gentil and his collaborators

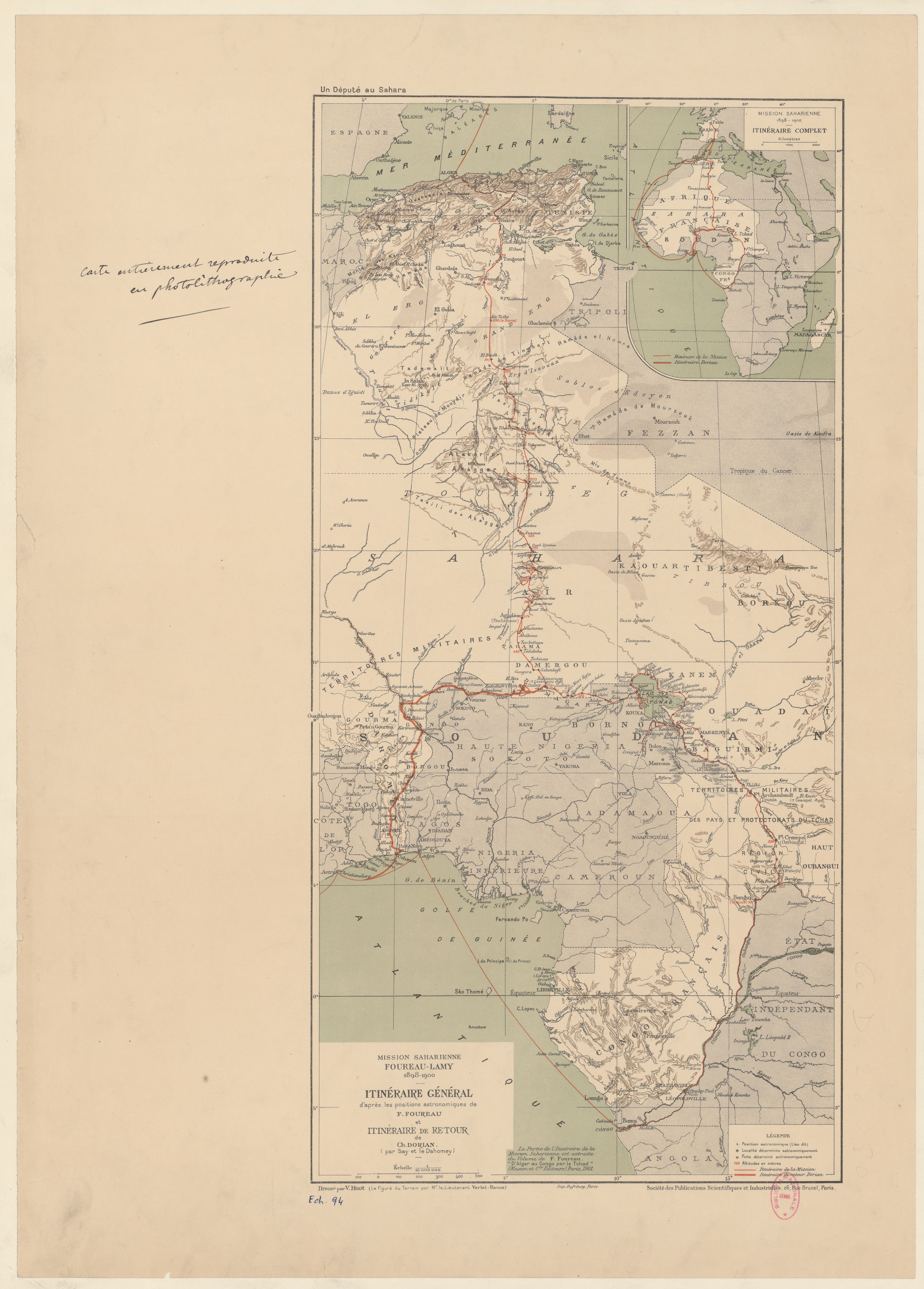
Fernand Foureau-Amédée-François Lamy Sahara Mission (1890–1900) map

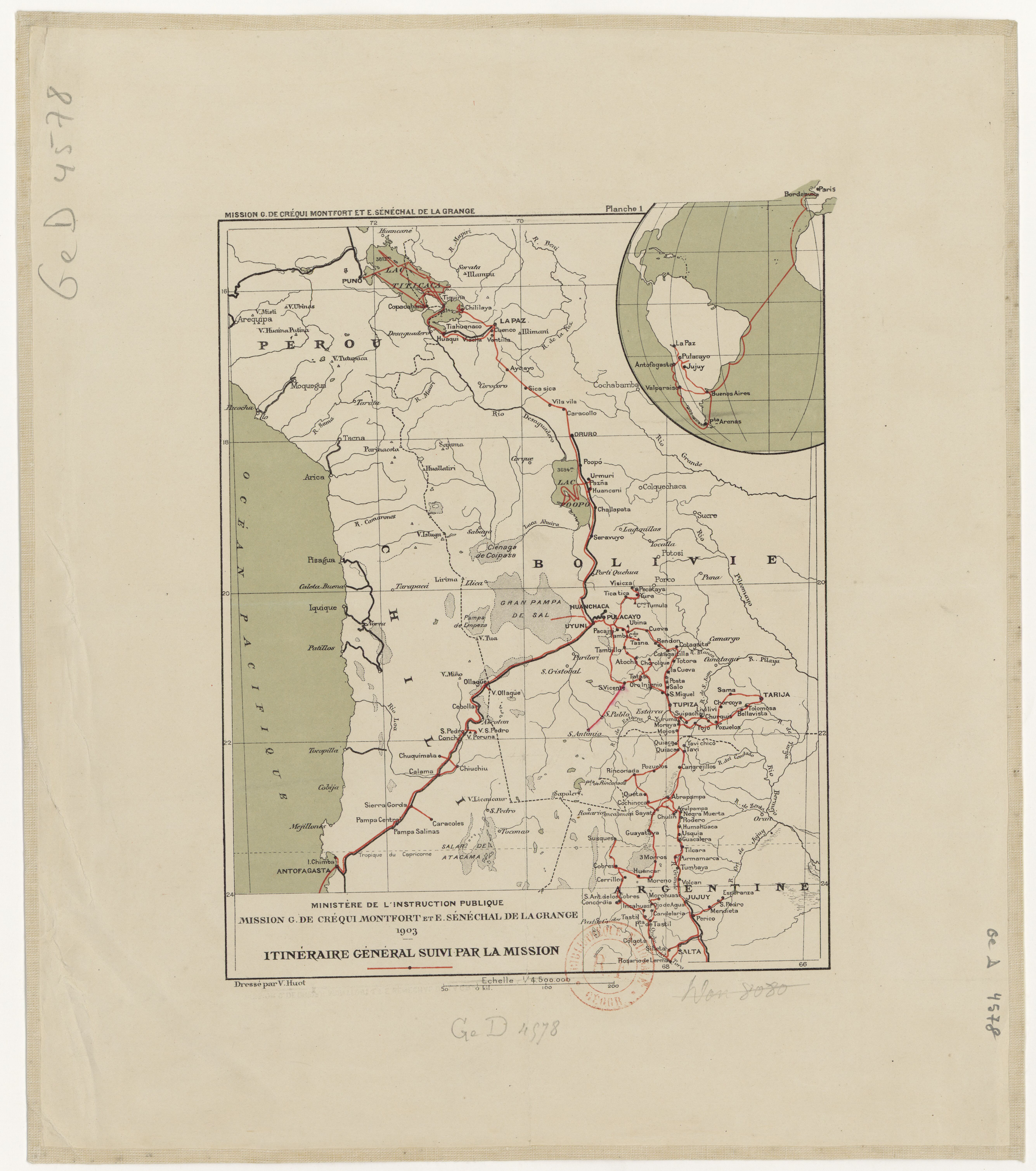
Mission G. de Créqui-Montfort & Eugène Sénéchal de Lagrange Bolivia, Argentina, Chile and Peru (1903)

Victor Huot (August 26, 1867 – April 28, 1915) was a French cartographer, who drew maps of various areas including South America and Africa.

Huot worked for publisher Hachette et Cie. He was a member of the Paris Geographical Society and the American Geographical Society. He made a map of the Andes. Hout was killed in battle on April 28, 1915.

== See also ==
- Jean Jacques Nicolas Huot
