= Émile Gentil =

19/20th-century French colonial administrator and military leader

Émile Gentil in 1901

Émile Gentil (French pronunciation: [emil ʒɑ̃ti]; 4 April 1866 – 30 March 1914) was a French colonial administrator, naval officer, and military leader. He headed two military missions to conquer and consolidate territories north from modern Gabon to Chad. In 1902 Gentil was named commissioner-general of the French Congo residing at Brazzaville. Gabon's second-largest city Port-Gentil was named for him.

== Early life and military career ==
Born at Volmunster in the department of Moselle, he later attended the École Navale, the school that formed French naval officers. As an ensign, he was assigned to conduct hydrographic soundings along the Gabonese coast from 1890 to 1892. That year, he joined the colonial administration in Gabon.

== Missions to the African Interior ==
=== First Mission 1895–1897 ===
In 1895, Gentil was ordered to find a practical route to Chad, claiming the area between for France, and hence thwarting German and British expansion. On 27 July 1895, Gentil headed up the Congo River on the French steamship Léon-Blot. The ship was then dismantled and hauled by African laborers through the forest to reach navigable portions of the Oubangui, where he founded the French station at Fort-Archambault near one of Sultan Rabih az-Zubayr's major towns, Kouno (now in the Chari-Baguirmi Region of Chad). The mission then transported the steamboat overland again to the Chari, which stretches to Lake Chad in the north.

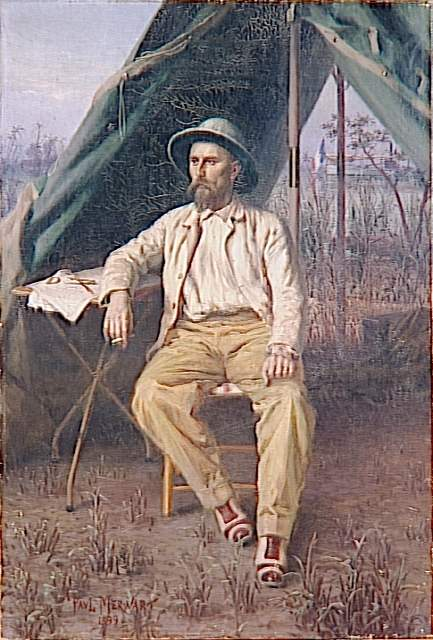
Émile Gentil in Africa, by Paul Merwart

In October 1897 he convinced the Sultan Abd ar Rahman Gwaranga to sign a treaty of alliance which gave France a protectorate over the Kingdom of Baguirmi, which was then threatened by Rabih az-Zubayr, the most powerful ruler in the Chad Basin.

On 20 October Gentil's mission passed through Rabih az-Zubayr, reaching Lake Chad on the 28th.

=== Second Mission, 1899 (the Gentil Mission) ===
After returning from France, where he had successfully lobbied the government to support further expansion, Gentil made preparations for a second Mission to seize the Chari-Baguirmi region and the area around Lake Chad from Rabih az-Zubayr. In 1899–1900, the French organized three armed columns: the Gentil Mission proceeding north from French Congo, the infamous Voulet–Chanoine Mission east from Niger and the Foureau-Lamy Mission south from Algeria. The objective was to link all French possessions in Western Africa.

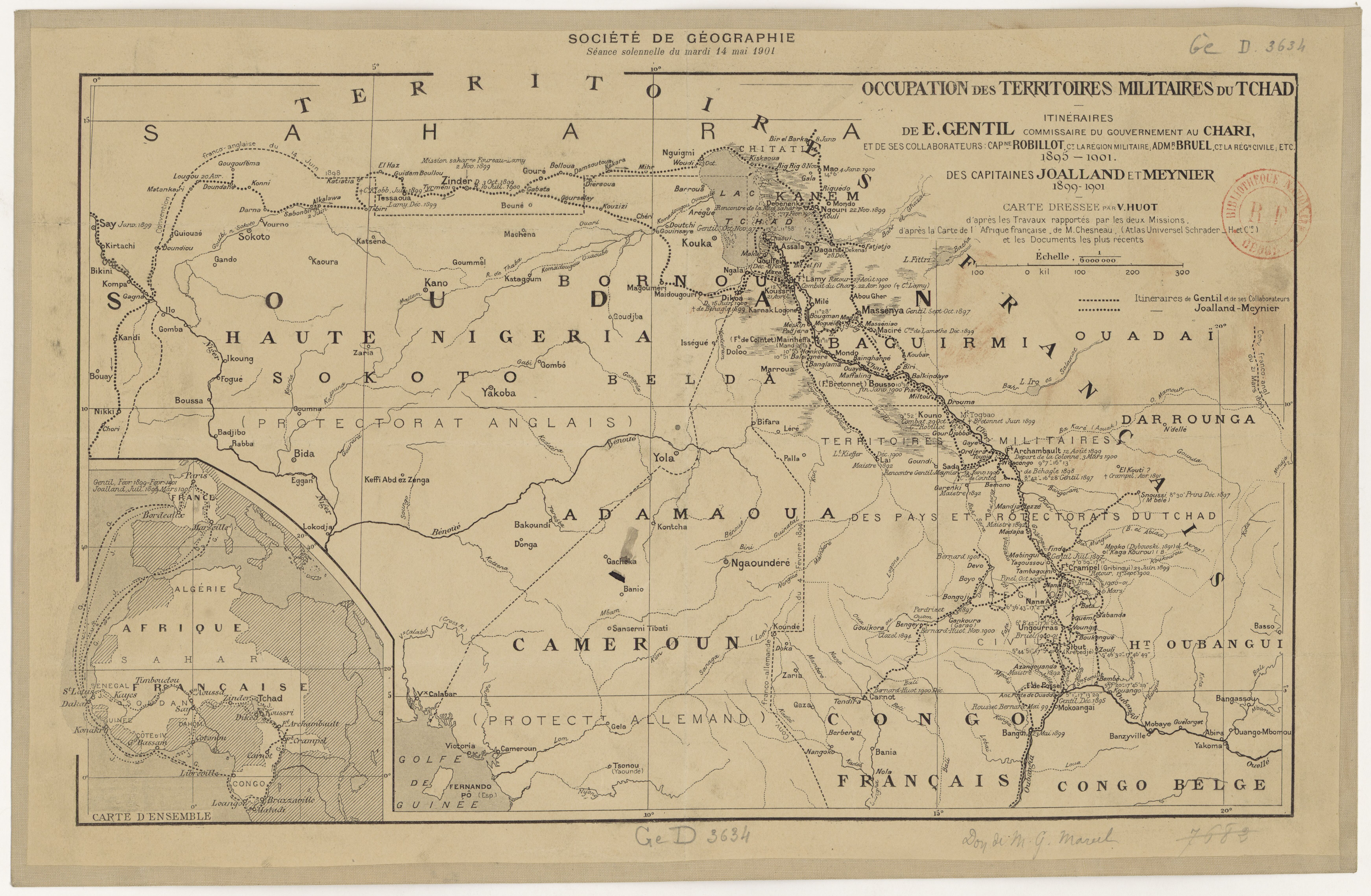
Map or the Occupation of the military territories of Chad. Itineraries of Émile Gentil and his collaborators drawn by Victor Huot

Again supported by the steamboat Léon-Blot, Gentil's force headed to the French station at Fort-Archambault. Unbeknownst to them, a previous military expedition commanded by the Lieutenant de vaisseau Henri Bretonnet and the Lt. Solomon Braun, along with Sultan Gaourang's Baguirmi forces had been annihilated by Rabih's forces in the Battle of Togbao on 17 July after attacking Rabih at Kouno.

On 16 August, one of the three Senegalese tirailleurs who had survived reached Gentil and informed him of the battle.

Rabih's head, a war trophy after the fighting on 22 April 1900

The Gentil Mission burned the town of Kouno, and confronted Rabih at the Battle of Kouno on 28 October 1899. The French were pushed back, suffering losses, but this did not prevent them from linking up with the other missions at Kousséri on 21 April 1900, in what today is northern Cameroon. The next day the three columns commanded by Major Amédée-François Lamy confronted Rabih az-Zubayr, who still controlled most of Chad. The French won the ensuing Battle of Kousséri, ensuring them control of most of Chad, but the battle cost both commanders their lives. Rabih's son succeeded him, but his empire soon disintegrated under sustained French expansion.

This meant that the original expedition had now accomplished all its main aims: surveying the lands of Northern Nigeria and Niger (contributing to a clearer Franco-British delimitation of the colonial borders), uniting with the Foureau-Lamy mission and destroying Rabih's empire, which permitted the institution in September by the French government of the Military territory of Chad.

In Lamy's honour, Émile Gentil, who was later its first French governor, named the capital of the new French territory of Chad Fort-Lamy. In 1973 the Republic of Chad renamed it N'Djamena.

== Governorship of French Congo ==
On 5 February 1902 Gentil was named commissioner-general of the French Congo, residing at Brazzaville.

Gabon's second-largest city was named Port-Gentil for him.

== See also ==
- Henri Bretonnet Mission
- Battle of Togbao 1899
- Voulet–Chanoine Mission
- Paul Joalland
- Amédée-François Lamy
- Rabih az-Zubayr
- Battle of Kousséri
- Dar al Kuti
