= Amédée-François Lamy =

French military officer (1858–1900)

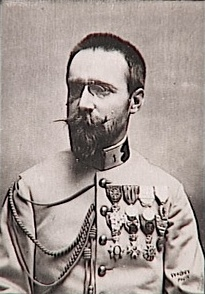
- Born: 7 February 1858; Mougins, Alpes-Maritimes, France
- Died: 22 April 1900 (aged 42); Kousséri
- Occupation: French commander Major
- Known for: Battle of Kousséri

Amédée-François Lamy (French pronunciation: [amede fʁɑ̃swa lami]) was a French military officer. He was born at Mougins, in the French département of Alpes-Maritimes on 7 February 1858 and died in the battle of Kousséri on 22 April 1900 as a French explorer officer.

== Biography ==
=== Family origins ===
He was the son of lieutenant Joseph Sosthène Lamy (1818–1891), originally from Nancy, and of Elisabeth Giraud, from an old and notable Provençal family, whose father Louis Giraud, notary, had married Honorine Courmes, from Grasse, the latter was the daughter of Claude-Marie Courmes, mayor of Grasse from 1830 to 1835.

=== Early years ===
Lamy's ambition to become an officer developed very early; at ten-years-old, he entered the Prytanée national militaire, where he won the first prize in Geography in the general concourse of all the department's school, a possible sign of his future colonial career. In 1877 he was admitted to Saint-Cyr, the foremost French military academy.

=== Military career ===
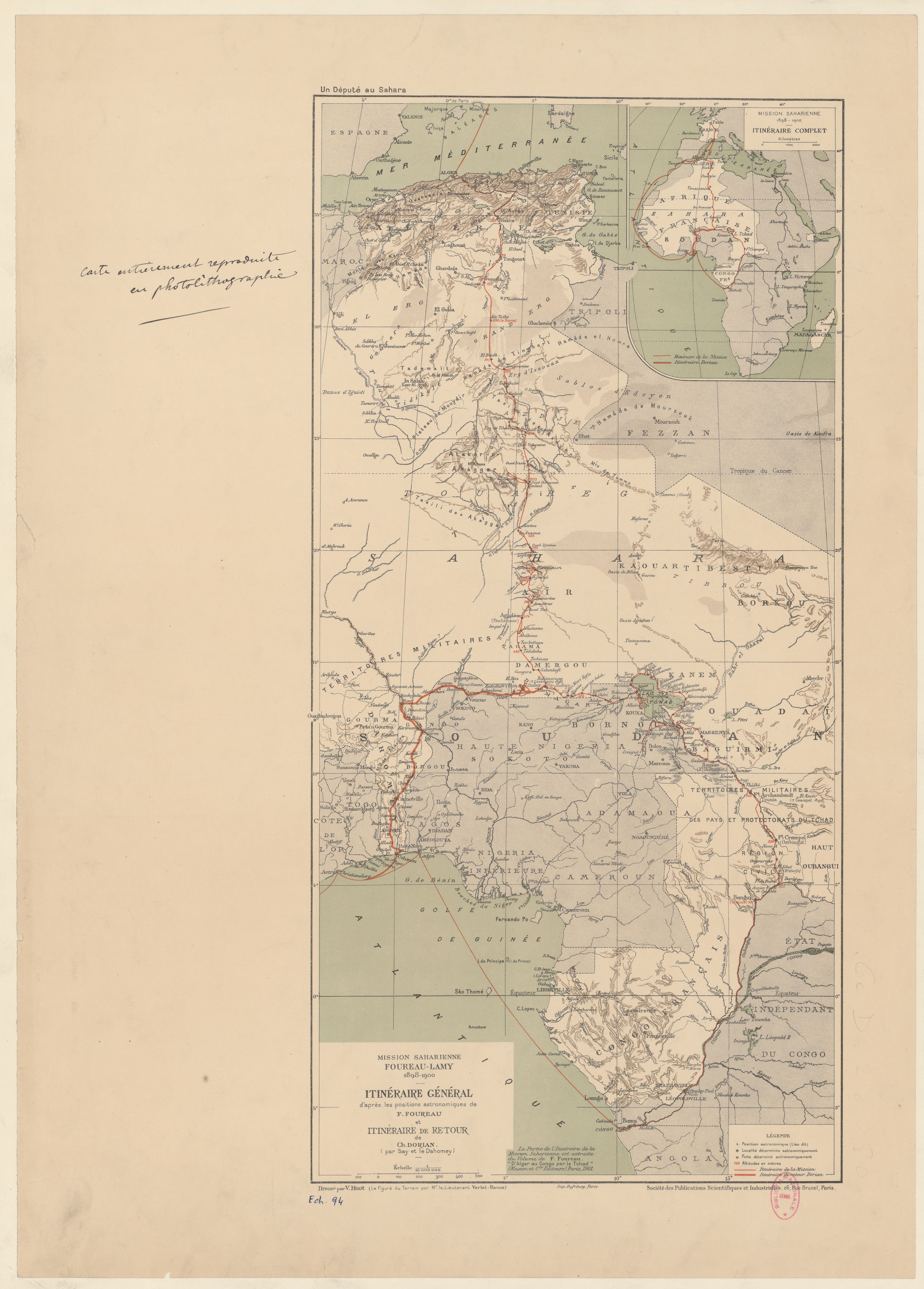
Fernand Foureau-Amédée-François Lamy Sahara Mission (1890-1900) map

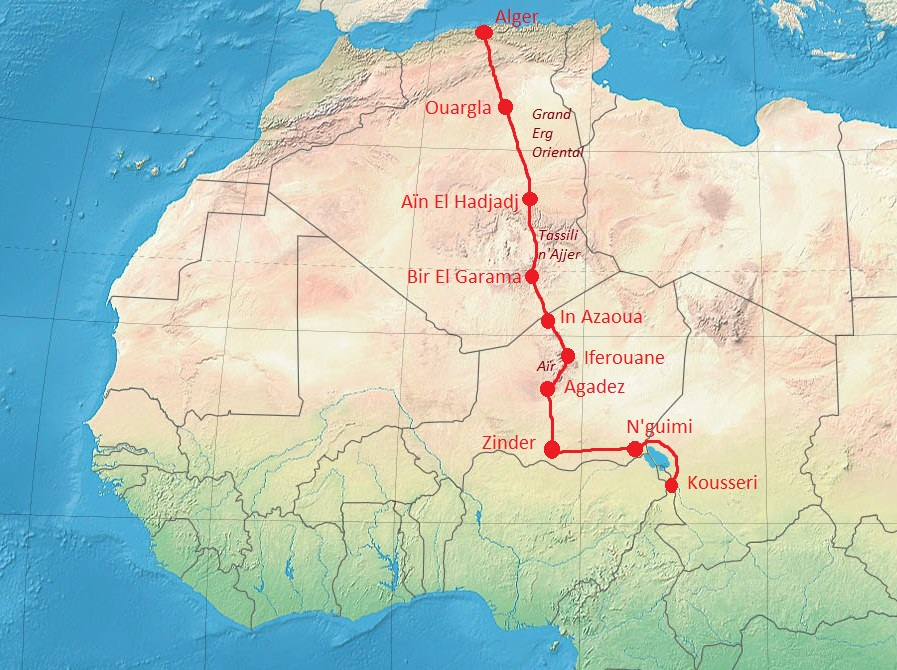
The Foureau–Lamy Mission 1898–1900

Lamy began his military career in 1879 as a second lieutenant in the First regiment of Algerian tirailleurs. He explored and discovered for France Saharan Africa, and took part in the French occupation of Tunisia; he was sent in 1884 to Tonkin, where he remained until 1886. The following year he was back in Algeria, where he became aide-de-camp to the General in command of the division quartered in Algiers in 1887, and resumed his previous interest in the Sahara and learned to exploit the qualities of the méharistes, the camel cavalry. Fascinated by the desert, he learned how to live with little: "Personally, I will be really happy only when I'll be able to live without neither drinking nor eating. At the moment, I'm attempting this kind of existence, but obtaining only a meagre success. I'm still obliged to eat more than six dates at my meals: this is afflicting!". In 1893 Lamy participated in the Le Chatelier Mission (Middle Congo) where he was in charge of studying the project of a railway between Brazzaville and the coast, and also of making botanical, geological and geographical studies. Through Alfred Le Chatelier, Lamy later met Fernand Foureau, with whom he assembled the Foureau-Lamy Mission in 1898, charged, with another two expeditions, the Gentil and Voulet–Chanoine missions, to conquer Chad and unify all French dominions in West Africa.

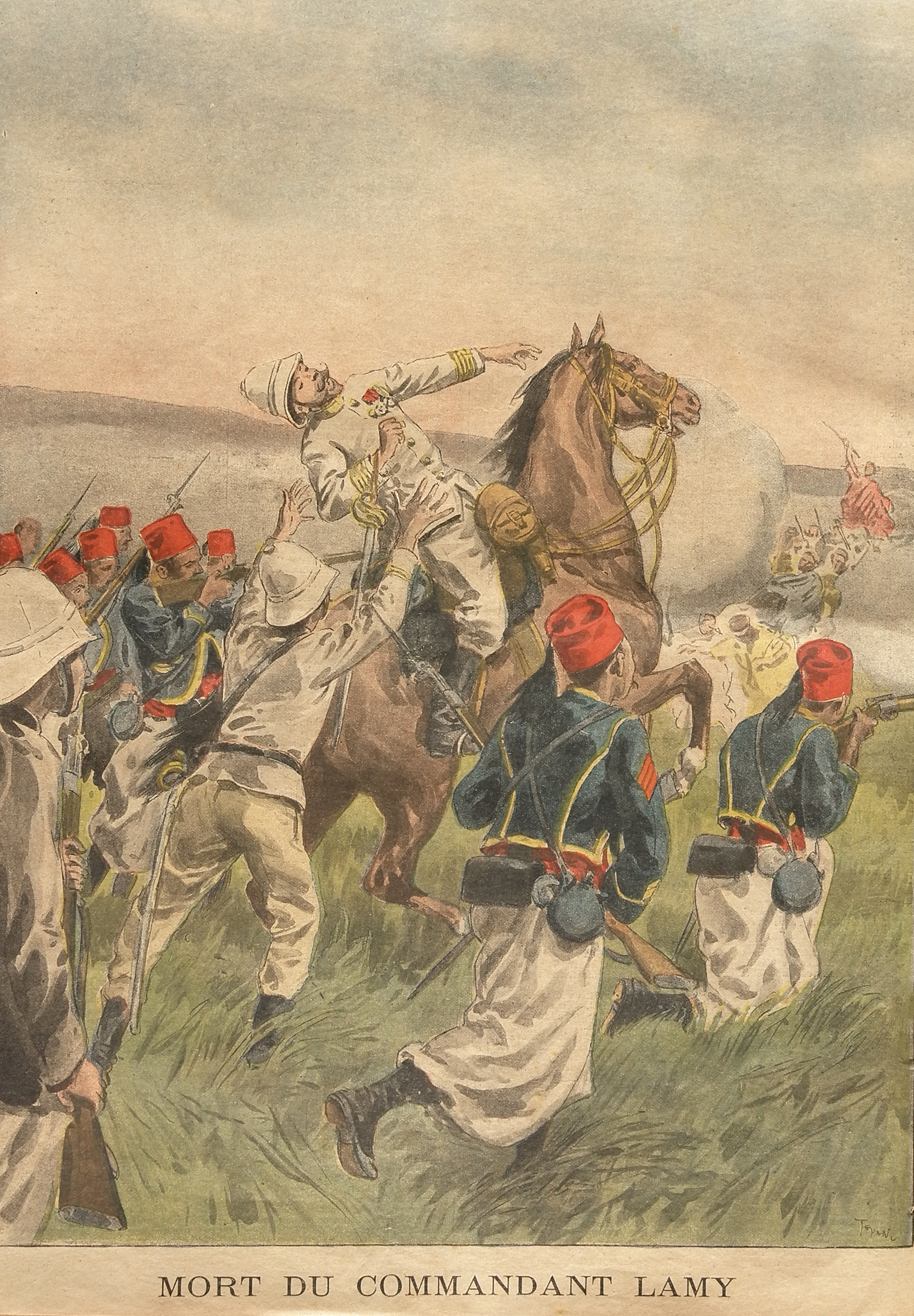
French newspaper view of the death of Lamy, surrounded by Tiraileurs Sénégalais troops

Foureau and Lamy proceeded from Algiers through the Sahara, and met with the other two missions at Kousséri on 21 April 1900. The following day the united French forces confronted Rabih az-Zubayr, a Sudanese warlord who had created an empire in the Chad Basin. In the following battle, in which Lamy was in command with 700 riflemen, while the French reported a crushing victory, Lamy was killed, as was Rabih. In his honour, the first French governor, Émile Gentil, named the capital of the new French territory of Chad Fort-Lamy, which name it bore until it was renamed N'Djamena in 1973.

In 1970, Chad issued an undated gold 1,000 francs coin as part of its tenth independence celebrations. One side features Lamy's head, with a military style collar, and the legend COMMANDANT LAMY 1900.

== National honours ==
- Officier de la Légion d'honneur

== Tribute ==
- Fort-Lamy, current capital of Chad (N'Djaména, since 1973) was founded by Émile Gentil on May 29, 1900 who gave it this name in his memory.
- Commander Lamy Monumen, Algiers,
- Commander Lamy Monumen, N'Djamena,
- Commander Lamy Monumen, Mougins
- Place du Commandant Lamy, 06250 Mougins
- Avenue du Commandant Lamy, 06250 Mougins
- Impasse du Commandant Lamy, 06250 Mougins
- rue du Commandant Lamy, 75011 Paris
- Rue du Commandant Lamy, 92400 Courbevoie
- Rue du Commandant Lamy, 51100 Reims
- Rue du Commandant Lamy, 06110 Le Cannet
- Rue du Commandant Lamy, 62300 Lens
- Rue du Commandant Lamy, 89000 Auxerre
- Rue du Commandant Lamy, 13007 Marseille
- Rue du Commandant Lamy, Casablanca Maroc
- Place Commandant Lamy, 83000 Toulon
- In Cannes, there is the Place du Commandant Lamy which leads to: rue d'Alger, rue d'Oran, rue de Constantine and rue de Bône.

There is a Lamy barracks in Longuyon 54

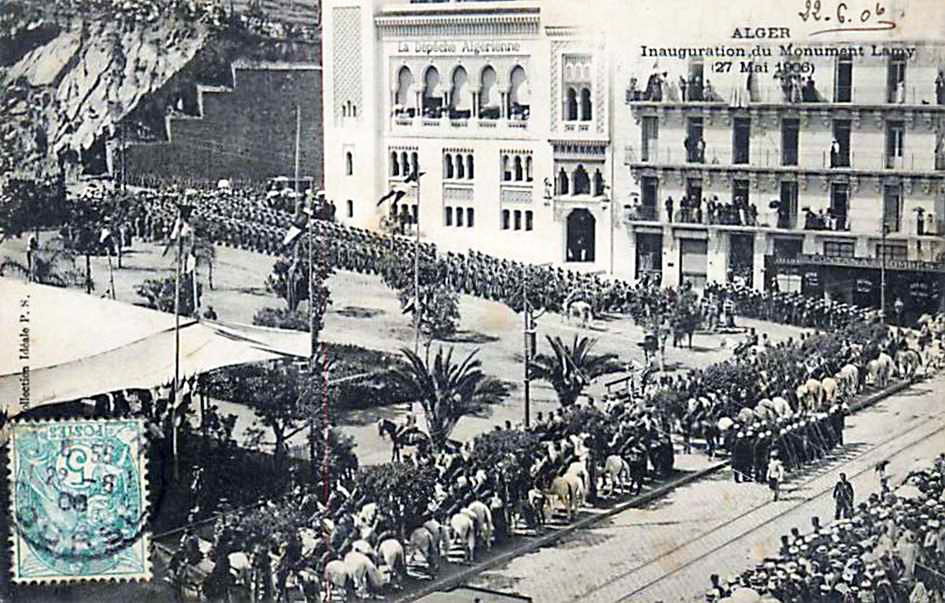
Inauguration of the Lamy monument in Algiers

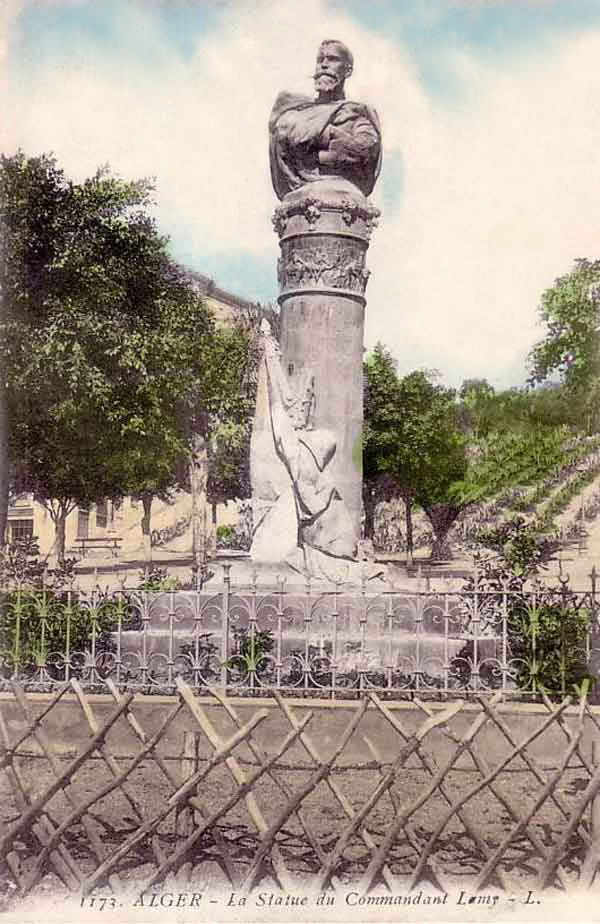
Statue of the Lamy monument in Algiers

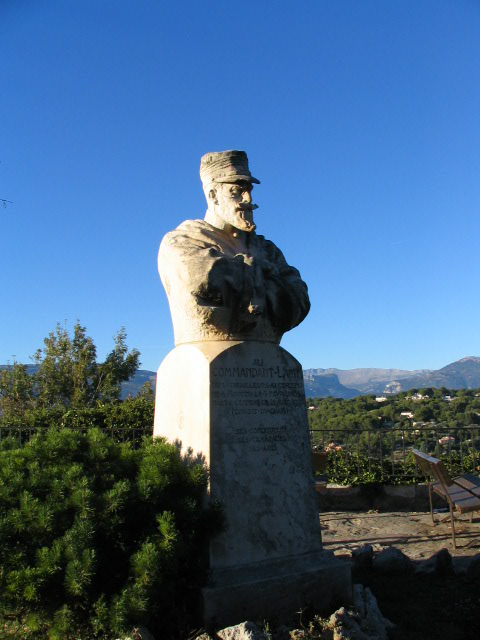
Commander Lamy
Memorial to Mougins

== Bibliography ==
- Marcel Souzy : Les coloniaux français illustres B. Arnaud Lyon vers 1940
- Gentil, Émile (1971). La chute de l'empire de Rabah. Hachette, 567–577.
- Ayakanmi Ayandele, Emmanuel (1979). Nigerian Historical Studies. Routledge, 130–131. ISBN 0-7146-3113-2.
- Pakenham, Thomas (1992). The Scramble for Africa. Abacus, 515–516. ISBN 0-349-10449-2.

== See also ==
- Henri Bretonnet Mission
- Battle of Togbao 1899
- Voulet–Chanoine Mission
- Paul Joalland
- Émile Gentil
- Rabih az-Zubayr
- Battle of Kousséri
