= Fernand Foureau =

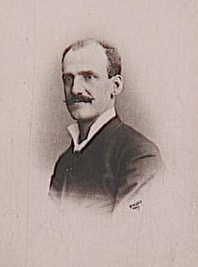
- Born: 17 October 1850; Saint-Barbant, Haute-Vienne, France
- Died: 17 January 1914 (aged 63); Paris
- Occupation: Explorer
- Known for: Exploration of the Sahara; Governor of Martinique, 1908–1913

Fernand Foureau (17 October 1850 – 17 January 1914) was a French explorer and Governor of Martinique from 1908 to 1913.

He was born at the Château de Frédière at Saint-Barbant in Haute-Vienne in the Limousin region of France. He studied under Henri Duveyrier, the Saharan explorer, who developed Foureau's own interest in the subject.

Once in the Sahara, Foureau carried out the first artesian well drilling for the company Oued RIHR and then became famous for his numerous study trips in the desert from 1882, which earned him several awards from the French Société de Géographie. Between 1888 and 1896 he also made nine expeditions to southern Algeria to study the feasibility of a trans-Saharan railway line from Ouargla to In Salah.

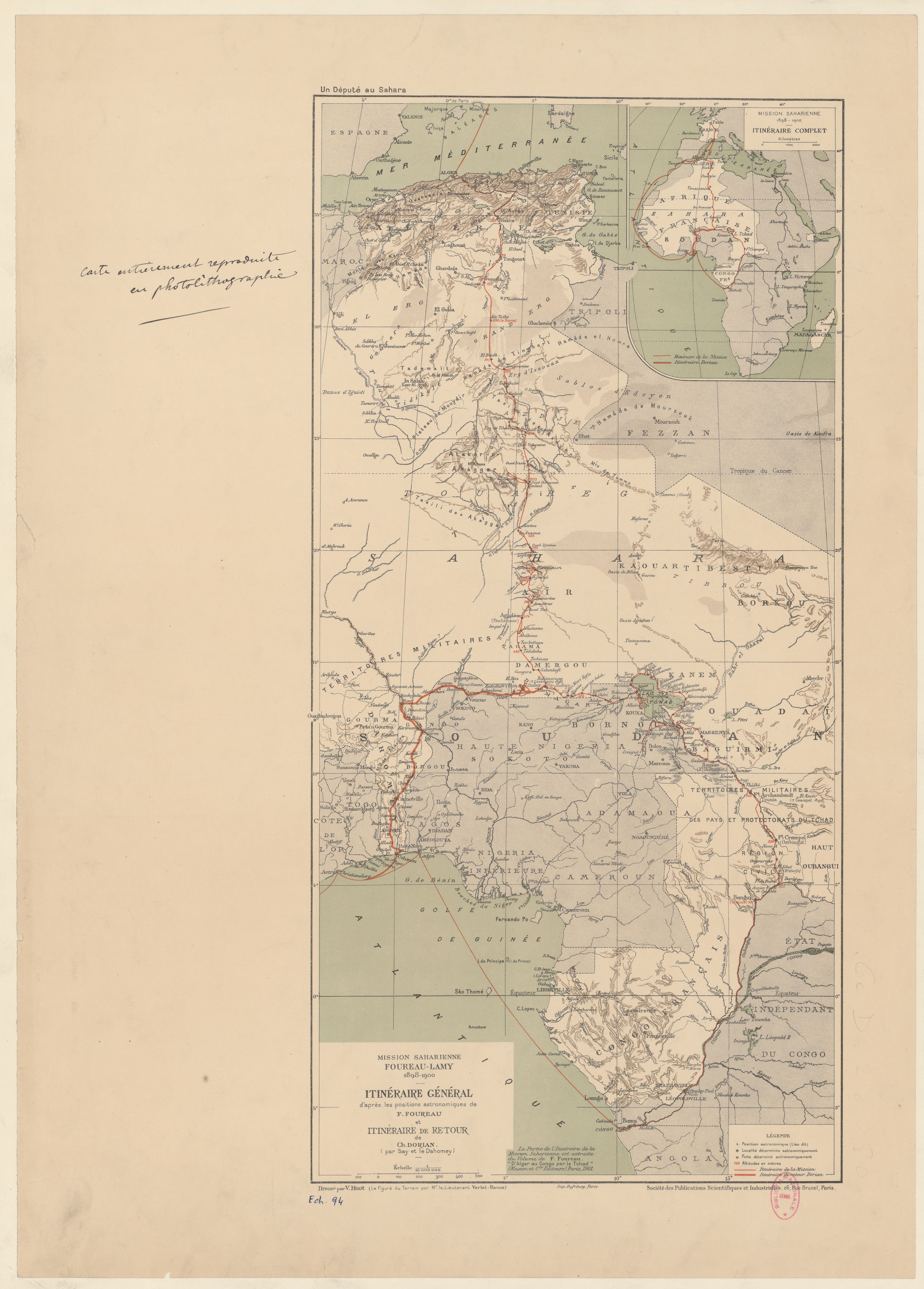
Fernand Foureau-Amédée-François Lamy Sahara Mission (1890–1900) map

From 1898 to 1900 he undertook the long journey from Ouargla to Lake Chad with Army officer Amédée-François Lamy, known as the Foureau–Lamy Mission, which was part of the French strategy to conquer Chad and unify all French dominions in West Africa. He made maps, established trans-Saharan routes and performed numerous geographical and meteorological surveys. In 1901 he was awarded the Gold Medal of the French Société de Géographie.

In 1906 he was appointed Governor of Mayotte and Comoros and from 1908 to 1913 served as Governor of Martinique.

== Honours and awards ==
- 1889 : Prix Erhard of the Société de géographie
- 1895 : Prix Duveyrier of the Société de géographie
- 1896 : Prix Janssen of the Société de géographie for his work on the Sahara and the Grande médaille d'or of the société de géographie of Marseille.
- 1899 : Patron's Medal of the Royal Geographical Society of London.
- 1901 : Grande Médaille d'Or des Explorations of the Société de géographie
- 1901 : Prix Leconte of the Paris Academy of Sciences
- 1913 : Commander of the Legion of Honour (chevalier in 1894, officer in 1900).

He also received the colonial medal with clasp " Mission Saharan Africa", was raised to the rank of Commander of the Order of the Crown of Belgium and Grand Officer of the Order of the Dragon of Annam.
