= Paul Merwart =

French-Polish illustrator and painter

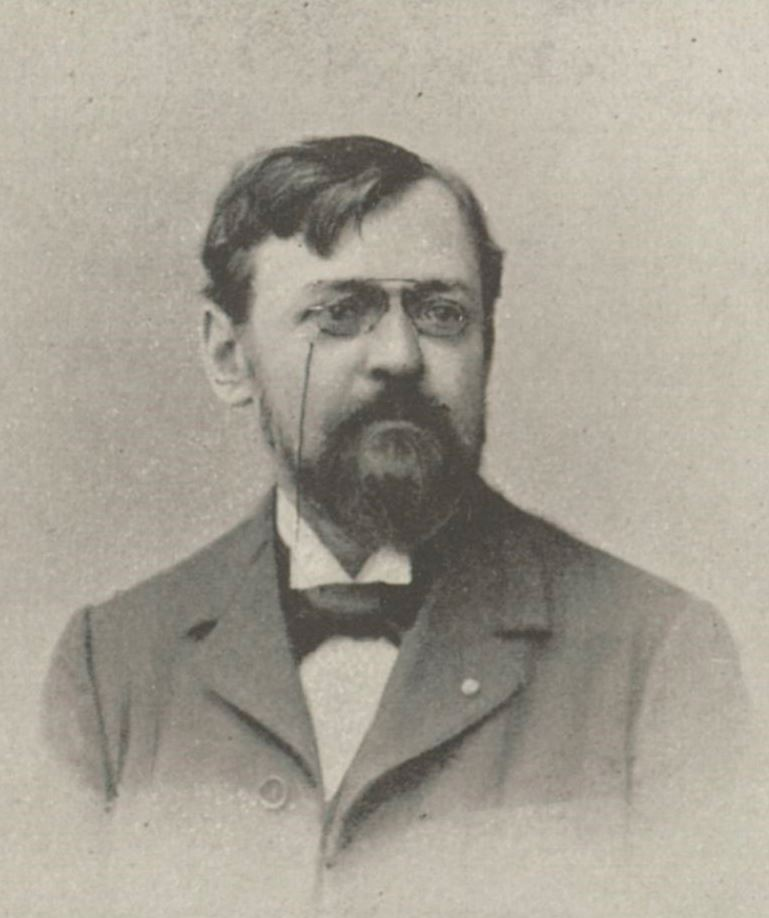

Paul Merwart, or Paweł Merwart (25 March 1855 – 8 May 1902), was a Polish-French illustrator and painter; mostly of portraits and genre scenes, inspired by literature, the Bible, and music.

== Biography ==
He was born in Marianovka, Kherson Governorate, Russian Empire. His mother was Polish and his father was a French soldier who was serving in the Crimean War. He was raised in Lemberg, then Austrian Empire, now Ukraine. At first, he studied technical subjects in Graz. After being wounded in a duel, he went to recuperate in Italy. While there, he decided to pursue an artistic career instead.

He began his studies in Vienna and Munich (1876), then went to Düsseldorf (1877), and finally to Paris, where he enrolled at the École des Beaux-Arts (1877–1884), completing his studies with Henri Lehmann and Isidore Pils.

He had his first showing at the Salon of 1879 in Paris. During his time there, he worked for Le Monde Illustré, L'Illustration and L'Univers illustré. He also served as a correspondent in Russia and Austria.

After graduating, he became a French citizen and settled in Paris. In 1896, thanks to the influence of his brother Émile, a prominent colonial administrator, he was appointed official painter for the "Ministère de la Marine et des Colonies". In this position, he made trips to the Canary Islands, Senegal, Sudan, Kongo, Tunisia, Mauretania, Somalia, and Guiana. As would be expected, his works increasingly came to focus on exotic themes.

In April 1902, he accompanied a government commission to investigate volcanic activity on Martinique. In May, he was one of almost 30,000 people killed when Mount Pelée suddenly erupted, destroying the town of Saint-Pierre. A memorial plaque was placed in the Forest of Fontainebleau, where he often painted.

== Gallery ==
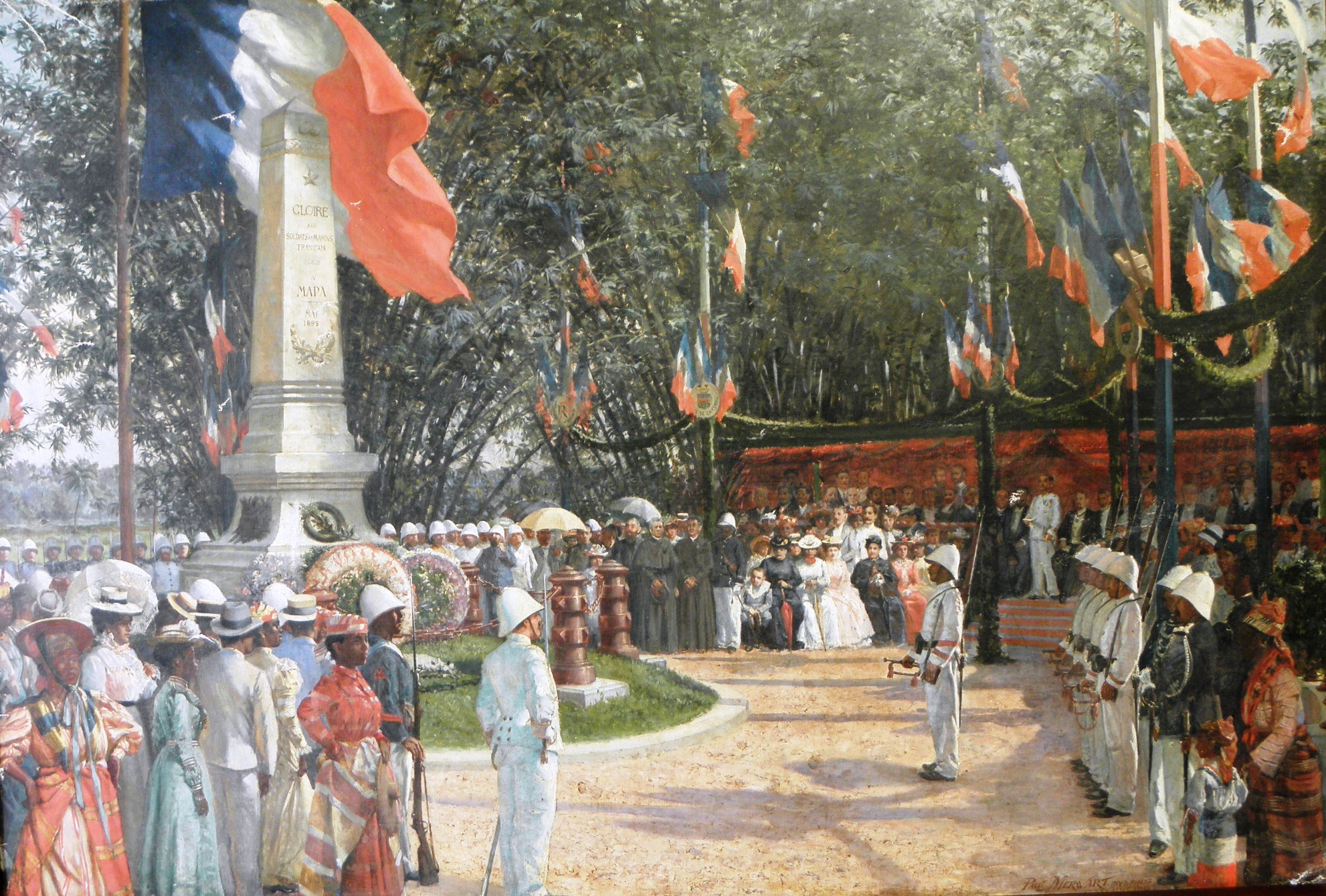
Inauguration at Cayenne Cemetery on 31 August 1901

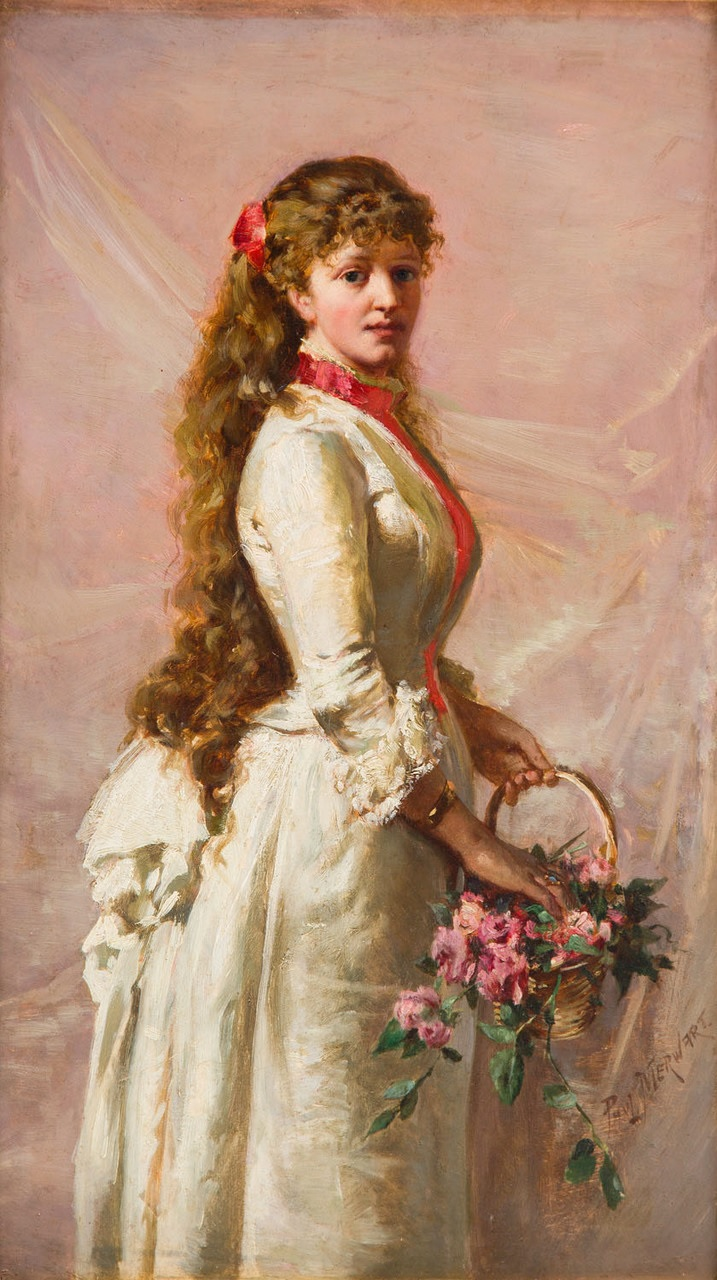
Parisian girl with a basket of flowers

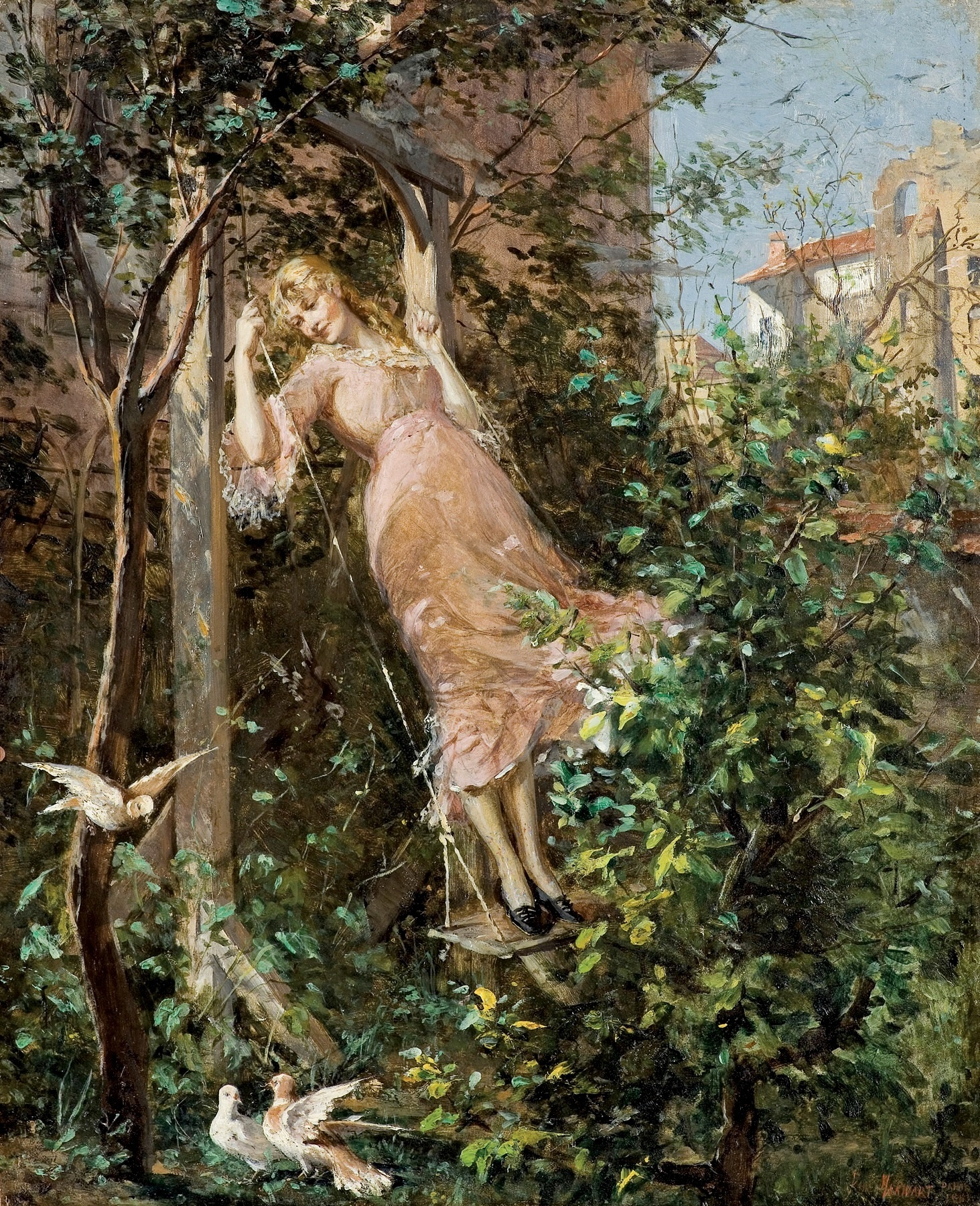
On a Swing (1881)

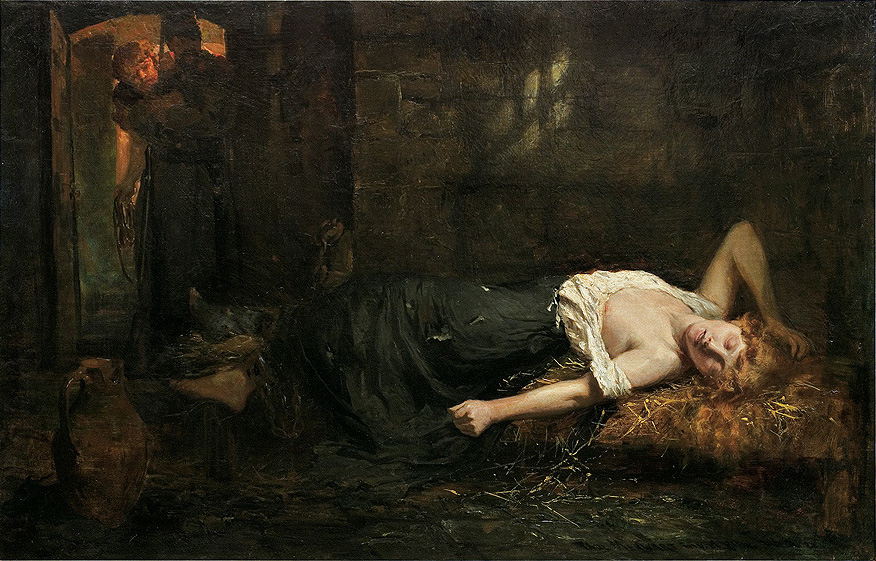
The Nihilist (1882)
