= Solomon Braun =

Solomon Braun (1868–1899) was a French lieutenant of artillery, born at Paris in 1868 and died in Togbao, Chad, in 1899. His father, a poor peddler, observing Solomon's capacity for learning, made the greatest sacrifices to give him a good education. Solomon successfully passed the competitive examination for the École Polytechnique, whence he graduated as lieutenant of artillery. In 1897 he obtained permission from the Minister of War to join the perilous expedition for the exploration of Lake Chad under Lieutenant Henri Bretonnet. The expedition was surprised by the forces of Rabih az-Zubayr, ruler of the region, and almost every member of the mission was killed, Solomon included.
