= Rabih az-Zubayr =

Sudanese warlord and empire-builder

Rabih
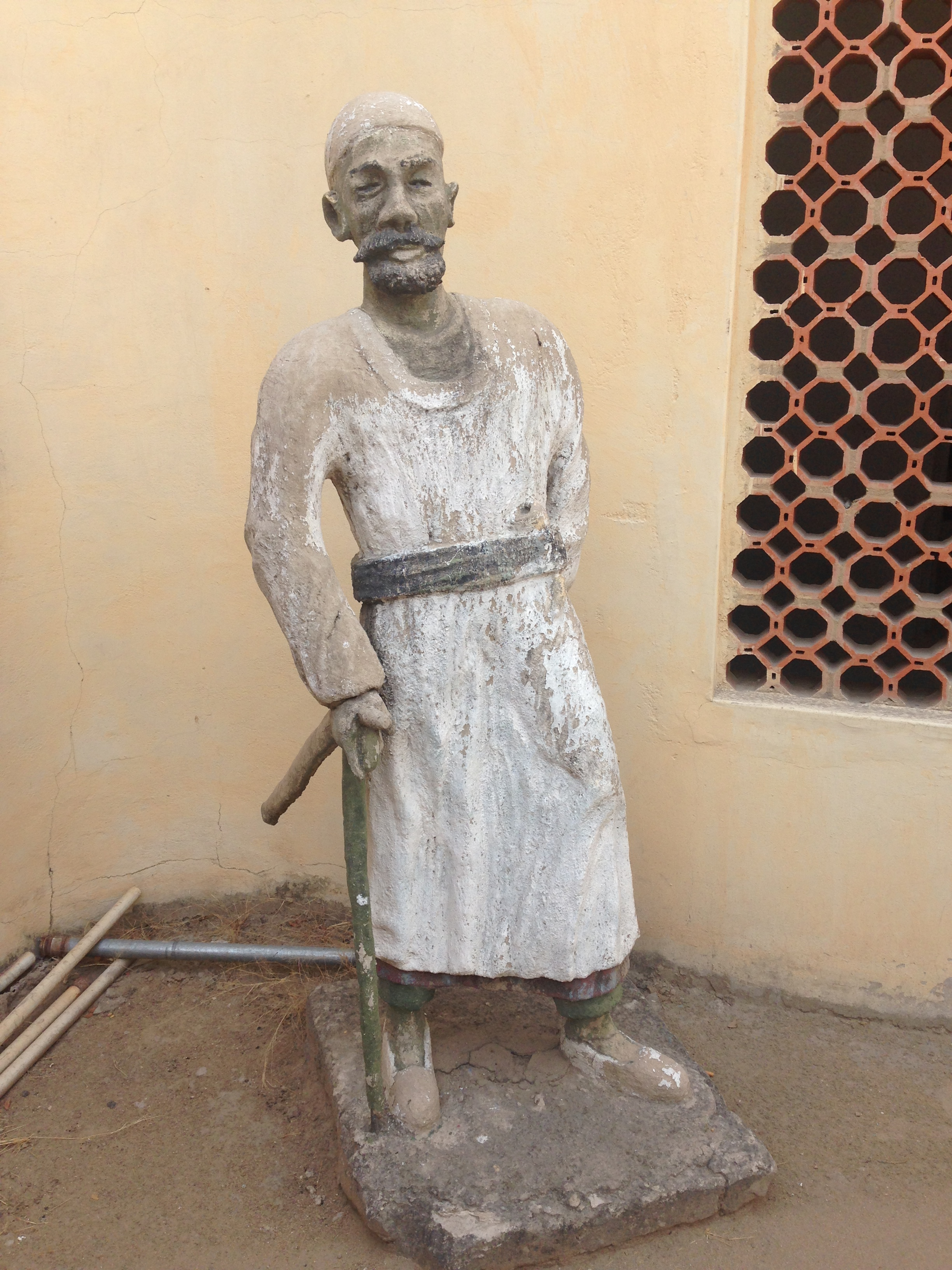
- Statue of Rabih at the National Museum Maiduguri in Borno State, Nigeria

Emir of the Kanem–Bornu Empire
- Reign: 2 October 1893 – 22 April 1900
- Successor: Fadlallah
- Born: c. 1840; Halfaya al-Muluk, Khartoum North
- Died: 22 April 1900 (aged c. 60); Lakhta, near Kousséri
- Issue: Fadlallah; Muhammad Niebe; Hawwa

Rabih az-Zubayr bin Fadlallah (Arabic: رابح فضل الله ,رابح الزبير ابن فضل الله, romanized: Rābiḥ az-Zubayr ibn Faḍlallāh; c. 1840 – April 22, 1900) was a Sudanese warlord, adventurer, and slave trader who through conquests established a large and powerful empire in Central and West Africa in the late 19th century. A formidable military tactician and leader, Rabih supplanted the al-Kanemi dynasty of the Kanem–Bornu Empire and frustrated European colonial interests in the region for several years.

Rabih began his career as a soldier in the Egyptian army under Isma'il Pasha, eventually joining the raider and trader Al-Zubayr Rahma Mansur in the Bahr el Ghazal. After Mansur's forces were suppressed by the Egyptians and British, Rabih took a small force westwards and gradually built up a larger army and considerable wealth through raiding. Over the course of about a decade, Rabih's army grew from 400 soldiers to 5,000 and he became strong enough to face and defeat well-established states in central Africa, such as the Sultanate of Bagirmi. In 1892–1894, Rabih conquered the Kanem–Bornu Empire and transformed it into a military dictatorship under the leadership of himself and his close military commanders. Rabih instituted a highly efficient but brutal and extortionate taxation system, and his army was one of the best-equipped and best-organised forces in sub-Saharan Africa. Rabih's rule was particularly damaging for the traditionally prosperous agriculture of Bornu and caused food production to run dangerously low.

Rabih's independent rule over Bornu ran counter to French interests in the region. In 1899–1900, France sent several expeditionary forces against Rabih in the so-called Rabih War. In 1900, a French army led by Amédée-François Lamy and Émile Gentil, supported by local allies, defeated and killed Rabih at the battle of Kousséri. Although the al-Kanemi dynasty was briefly restored under French colonial suzerainty, Rabih's death paved the way for the French colonisation of Chad. Rabih was one of the last major opponents of the French colonial empire and is a controversial figure in African history, remembered both for his brutal rule and for his resistance against European colonialism.

== Early life and career ==
=== Life in Egyptian Sudan ===
Rabih az-Zubayr's year of birth is typically placed c. 1840. Alternate dates sometimes given include c. 1835, c. 1842, and c. 1845. He was born in Halfaya al-Muluk, later a suburb of Khartoum. Rabih was of Nilotic, possibly Shanqella, origin and was enslaved as a child.

At the age of twenty, Rabih joined the Egyptian army and served for some years, mostly stationed in Cairo. Rabih was eventually drawn to the Bahr el Ghazal region, where he sought his fortune in the lucrative trade of ivory and slaves. In the Bahr el Ghazal, Rabih met Al-Zubayr Rahma Mansur, a raider and trader from the Ja'alin tribe, and was accepted into his service. Mansur rose to become a highly important figure in Egyptian Sudan. By 1874, Mansur was (under Egyptian suzerainty) the effective ruler of the Bahr el Ghazal, as well as large parts of what is today northern Congo and the Central African Republic. In 1874, Mansur conquered the Sultanate of Darfur, bringing it under Egyptian rule. Mansur quarreled with the ruler of Egypt, Isma'il Pasha, and was briefly detained in Egypt until his son Suleiman was recognised as his successor. Under Suleiman, wars of expansion to the west and south continued, in which Rabih participated as a leading commander. Rabih was particularly active in campaigns around the Ubangi River.

In 1878, Suleiman was forced into rebellion by the new governor of Sudan, Charles George Gordon. The rebellion was defeated with great difficulty by Romolo Gessi. After the fighting, Suleiman and most of his officers surrendered, but the Anglo–Egyptian authorities had them executed. Rabih and other officers who had not trusted the authorities enough to surrender escaped westwards, followed by about 400 soldiers.

=== Warlord ===
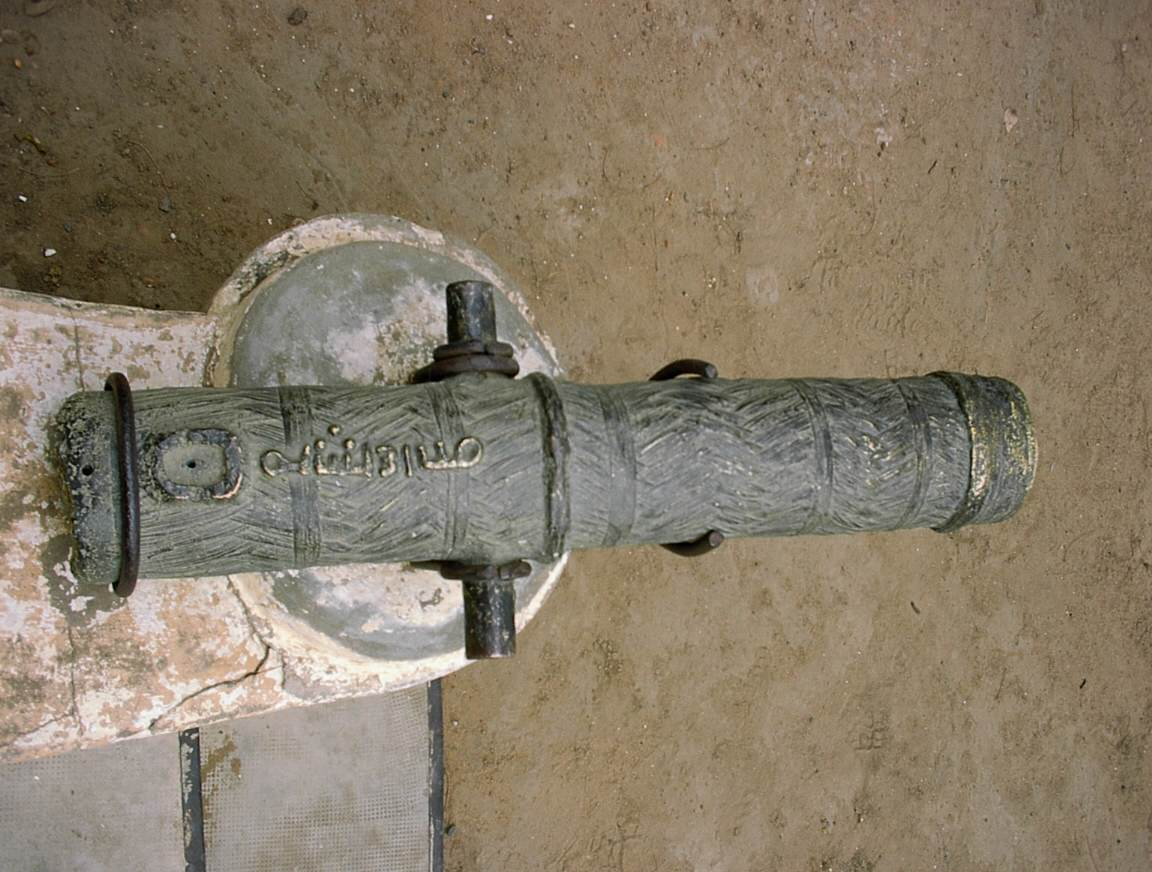
One of Rabih's cannons

In 1879, the officers of Rabih's force, which composed a council known as the Zubat al-Kubar, elected Rabih as their emir. In 1879–1891, Rabih and his forces operated in lands now part of the Central African Republic and southern Chad. The first target raided by Rabih was the land of the Azande people. Rabih's forces secured funds by raiding various villages and tribes, and he increased the size of his army by offering prisoners their freedom and their lives if they joined him. By the early 1890s, Rabih had built up a considerable military force. His army numbered about 5,000 men and he fielded 44 pieces of light field artillery. The army formed the base of Rabih's power, especially his highly mobile cavalry and the imported rifles used by his soldiers. His forces were typically able to raid lands surrounding their bases of operations with relative ease. In 1882–1884, Rabih created many zeribas (fortified camps) throughout the lands under his control. New recruits and slave soldiers were taught to fight with firearms.

In 1887, Rabih accepted the authority of the new Mahdist State in Sudan. The Mahdists were building an Islamic reform movement in Sudan, and Rabih shared their anti-European sentiments. Rabih corresponded with the self-appointed Mahdist caliph, Abdallahi ibn Muhammad, but his officers did not wish to make the journey to Omdurman, the Mahdist capital. Rabih saw himself as a disciple of the Mahdi, Muhammad Ahmad, and began to build up his own military state in the Bahr el Ghazal after the establishment of the Mahdist State in Sudan. Certain elements of the Mahdist army, including its devotional exercises and uniform, were adopted by Rabih's forces.

When Belgian colonial forces arrived in the northern Congo, Rabih took his forces further north into the Chari River valley. Rabih intended to establish a base of operations in the Mandara Kingdom, from where he could trade both with North Africa and with settlements along the Benue River. In 1888–1889, Rabih campaigned in the south, attacking the Sara people and capturing a large number of slaves. In 1890, Rabih was in the Dar al Kuti region and approached the Sultanate of Bagirmi. He stayed at Dar al Kuti and Dar Runga until he was defeated by an army sent by the Wadai Sultanate. In 1891, Rabih's lieutenant Muhammad al-Sanussi massacred a French expedition led by Paul Crampel. Out of a desire to avoid provoking the French and reach the rich agricultural region around Bornu, Rabih's army traveled to Bagirmi, where they at first enjoyed friendly relations with its ruler, Gaourang II. Relations deteriorated and Rabih soon drove Gaourang from his capital at Massenya. In 1892, Rabih defeated a joint Bagirmi–Wadai army and then went on to conquer several Kotoko principalities without meeting any strong resistance. Rabih then reached the Mandara Kingdom, but the Mandarans were able to repel his attacks.

== Conquest of Bornu ==
=== Preparations ===
The Kanem–Bornu Empire, vassals, and neighboring states in 1810. The political situation was broadly similar when Rabih entered Bornu territory.

In 1892, Gaourang II had requested military aid against Rabih from shehu Ashimi of the Kanem–Bornu Empire. Ashimi refused to send troops but imposed restrictions on the export of weapons and ammunition to Rabih. These restrictions were poorly enforced and much of Rabih's supplies continued to come from Bornu. After the defeat of Bagirmi, Rabih began to meddle in the affairs of the Kanem–Bornu Empire. He imposed demands on the sultan of Karnak Logone (also known simply as Logone), a vassal state of Bornu. Karnak Logone could scarcely refuse Rabih's demands. Ashimi responded by reprimanding the sultan, but took no further action to maintain authority over the territory. In 1892 or 1893, Rabih occupied Logone as a result of a coup. The populace were ejected and the strongly fortified town was turned into Rabih's base of operations.

Ashimi and his advisors adopted a policy of "waiting and seeing" in regard to Rabih's actions. Rabih exploited this in order to achieve several victories with little resistance in territories bordering Bornu proper, while he prepared for a campaign against Kukawa, the Bornuan capital. Ashimi may have hoped that Rabih would simply spare his empire. These hopes were partially sustained since Bornu harbored the exile Hayatu ibn Sa'id, a claimant to the Sokoto Caliphate and a son-in-law of Rabih. The nobility of Bornu were suspicious of Hayatu, but he was well-known to wish to take over the Sokoto Caliphate. The leading men of Bornu may thus have expected Rabih to help him in this, instead of attacking Bornu. Ashimi was unprepared for anything other than peace and made no effort to discover Rabih's intentions. Rabih meanwhile gathered intelligence on Kukawa through several sources, including local Kanuri who joined his army and Sudanese merchants in the city. Rabih became convinced that conquering Bornu would be relatively easy. Rabih achieved the support of Hayatu after they entered into an agreement that Hayatu would help conquering Bornu, and that Rabih would in turn help Hayatu take power in the Sokoto Caliphate. Rabih also had the support of the Baggara Arabs and their Kukawa-based trading community.

=== Invasion ===
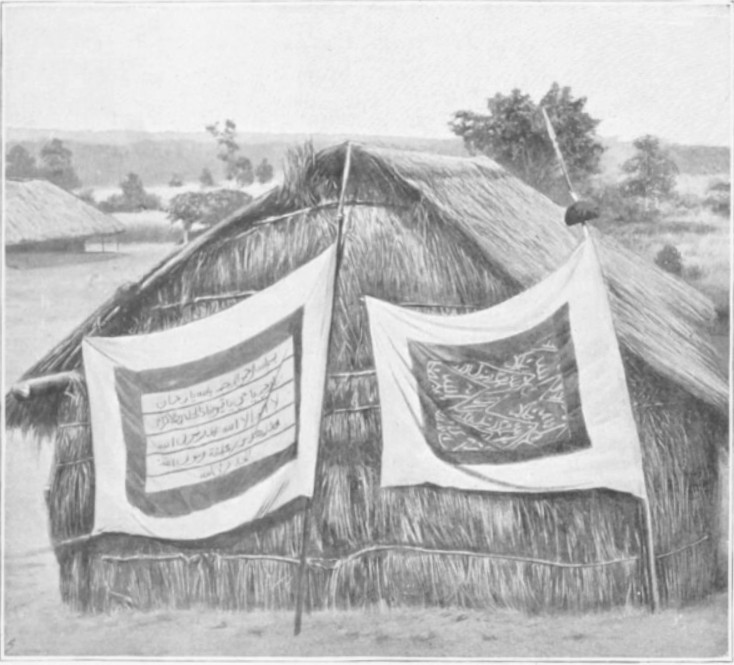
Battle flags of Rabih

In the summer of 1893, Rabih and his army entered Bornu proper and camped at Amja, on the frontier. From Amja, Rabih's forces could raid and harvest resources from the corn-rich surrounding Kala/Balge region. Ashimi was at first uncertain how to deal with the invasion but eventually decided to send an army under Momman Tahr to face Rabih. Tahr was an experienced general but it is unclear why Ashimi did not lead the army himself. Perhaps Ashimi did not realise the gravity of the situation or was hoping to eliminate Tahr as a potential rival. Rabih's invasion force was about 3,000 men strong, about half of whom were armed with muskets or rifles. Tahr's army was much larger, possibly numbering as many as 30,000 soldiers, most of whom were familiar with the area.

The two armies clashed at the battle of Amja, in May 1893, where Rabih positioned his right flank behind a swamp. The swamp may have been the result of recent heavy rains, and thus unknown to the Bornu army. Tahr sent much of his cavalry through the swamp, hoping to surprise Rabih's forces, but the horses got stuck and Rabih's riflemen were able to pick them off. Most of Tahr's forces soon fled the battle, and Tahr himself was captured and executed. Upon hearing of Tahr's defeat, Ashimi took to the field with his own army, led by himself and his nephew, Kyari. In about August, Ashimi and Kyari engaged Rabih's forces at the battle of Lekarawa. Rabih was outnumbered again but once more defeated the Bornuans. Ashimi and Kyari fled back to Kukawa, where the populace expected the shehu to prepare the city's defenses and attempt to fend off Rabih's attack. Ashimi and his closest advisors instead gathered their family and belongings and fled in the night, leaving the capital undefended.

Upon reaching Kukawa, Rabih showed little mercy, ruthlessly pillaging and laying waste to the city. About 3,000 people were killed and another 4,000 were taken captive while Rabih's forces secured large amounts of plunder, including weapons, cattle, sheep, horses, camels, ammunition, cloth, robes, ivory, and 70,000 Maria Theresa thalers. Those who had cooperated with Rabih, such as Kukawa's Sudanese traders, were left unharmed. Rabih spent some time in Kukawa but decided to transfer his capital to Dikwa instead, probably on account of its better communications and water supply. The beginning of Rabih's rule over Bornu would later be dated to 2 October, perhaps corresponding to his occupation of Kukawa or Dikwa.

Ashimi fled across the Yobe River, establishing himself in the village of Maganwa, south of Geidam. Ashimi and his family (the al-Kanemi dynasty) still commanded the loyalty of much of the Bornuan populace, as demonstrated by a peasant uprising led by a man identified as mallam Gantur, which managed to defeat one of Rabih's commanders before being put down. Ashimi's actions during the invasion had raised questions of his leadership. Many of the leading courtiers traveled to Geidam, where they instead installed Kyari as the new shehu. Ashimi accepted the transfer of power, even attending Kyari's investment ceremony. Kyari feared that the presence of two living shehus would threaten his legitimacy and leadership in the war effort and thus had his uncle assassinated while Ashimi was offering his morning prayers. It was later claimed that Ashimi had been corresponding with Rabih.

Kyari regrouped the Bornuan army and prepared to lead his forces to retake Kukawa and then advance on Dikwa. In February/March 1894, Rabih intercepted Kyari's army near Gashegar, on the southern bank of the Yobe River. In the ensuing battle, the Bornuan army managed to overrun Rabih's forces and occupy and loot his war camp. Kyari blundered by not following up on his victory, planning to pursue Rabih in the following morning. Rabih regrouped his forces in the night and launched a counterattack, which caused the Bornuans to panic and flee. Kyari, wounded in the attack, was unable to rally his army and led a desperate last stand until the morning, after which he was captured. Kyari was dragged before Rabih but refused to speak or answer any questions, eventually telling an interpreter to only "Tell this giant of a slave that if I had captured him I would not have asked him anything, I would have killed him on the spot. Let him not ask me any further questions. If he has anything to do, let him". Rabih had Kyari's throat cut. Kyari's brother Sanda Wuduroma made his way to southern Bornu, where he was proclaimed shehu, but he was captured and executed after less than a month, leaving Rabih the undisputed ruler of Bornu.

== Rabih's empire ==
=== Administration ===
Rabih's conquest of Bornu marked the first time the Kanem–Bornu Empire came under foreign rule in the over a thousand years of its history. Rabih's regime took the shape of a totalitarian and ruthless military dictatorship, with power concentrated in the hands of Rabih and the Zubat al-Kubar. The military and civil administrations of the state were not clearly separated, since Rabih's army suddenly transformed from a highly effective war machine into the state's administrative apparatus. Neither Rabih nor any of his officers had any formal training for the task of administering a state such as Bornu, an old empire with a long-established administration and organisation. Rabih's military commanders transitioned into the empire's chief fief holders (chima kura), supported by local nobles who submitted to the new regime.

As emir and commander of the army, Rabih was the undisputed head of state. His power was practically unlimited, though the Zubat al-Kubar remained and were consulted on military and political matters. After the conquest, the Zubat al-Kubar numbered twenty-nine, after the addition of Rabih's two sons Fadlallah and Muhammad Niebe. The al-Kanemi state was reorganised to suit Rabih's needs. The al-Kenemi shehus had allowed local rulers limited autonomy, a system partially kept under Rabih. All provincial rulers and courtiers who submitted to Rabih were allowed to keep and administer their lands, though now under the close supervision of Rabih's military commanders, who lived in Dikwa. Retaining the local rulers gave Rabih's regime some legitimacy in the eyes of the people. Local rulers who proved disloyal were executed and typically replaced with a family member. There was thus some continuity in the administration, though the fiefs under Rabih were more compact and larger than those under the shehus.

The Sharia-based justice system of the shehus ended with Rabih's conquest and no new system was put in place until 1895. Sharia law was reinstated in that year, possibly on the request of Hayatu or former courtiers of the shehus, or because Rabih desired to be seen as a good Muslim and needed social control in the administration of Dikwa. Rabih set up the empire's only court at Dikwa, headed by Alkali al-Madani, a Sudanese man who had lived in Kukawa before the conquest. The court was allowed leverage in its administration of justice, with Rabih himself only intervening in exceptional cases. When Rabih did intervene, his decisions were based largely on his own whims rather than Sharia. In one instance, Rabih judged a case where a young girl had refused to marry despite the insistence of her elders, and forced the girl to marry Razak-Allah, one of his own commanders, without her consent.

=== Economy ===
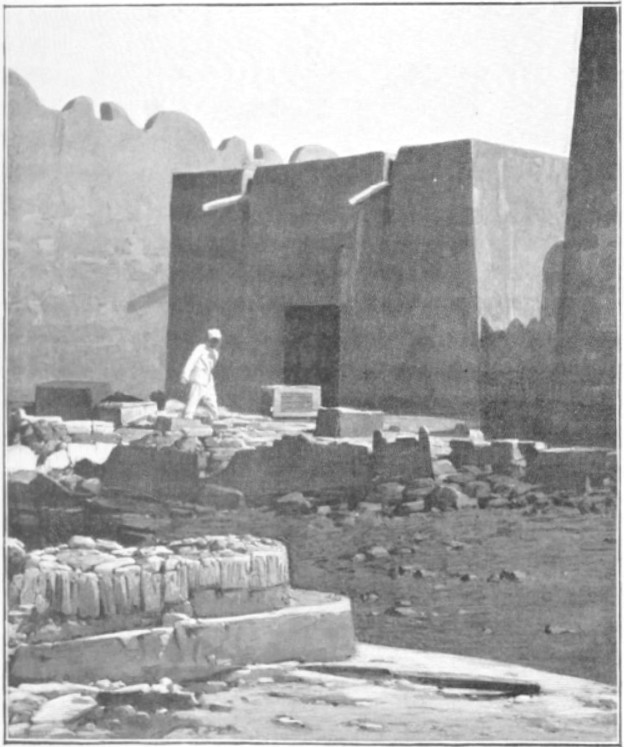
Rabih's palace at Dikwa

By the time of Rabih's conquest, agriculture was the base of the Bornuan economy and most of the populace lived off the land. There was also a well-developed merchant class, who traded both inside and outside the empire. As ruler, most of Rabih's attention was focused on taxation and trade. The survival of his state depended on the ability to extract enough resources to sustain the army, acquire new weapons and ammunition, and to conduct trade. Rabih instuted a heavy annual tax of one Maria Theresa thaler on every individual, collected through brutal and high-handed methods. Rabih's tax system was highly efficient but also extortionate on the people, with reports of properties of whole settlements being carried away and village elders being held for ransom. It has been argued that the system was in some ways fairer than the aristocratic rule of the shehus that had preceded Rabih, in particular in that the tax rate was fixed and that taxes were only collected once a year. Most of the income was also spent on the army and defense, with relatively little spent on personal luxuries of the ruler, in stark contrast to the spending of the shehus.

The agricultural sector of the Bornu economy was badly hit by Rabih's conquest, both due to direct destruction of crops and raids on the people, and due to mass displacement of people who fled Rabih's army and the overall uncertainty and fear. In his previous wars, Rabih had used a scorched earth policy, razing settlements and destroying standing crops. The same tactics had been used during the conquest of Bornu, despite Rabih's intention to settle down. The Rabih state did not have any agricultural policy and agriculture was largely neglected. Food was collected largely through raids on the people by the army. After a few years in power, food production was running dangerously low, so much so that contemporary reports suggested that Rabih might have to "quit Bornu soon in search of food". By 1898 there was "extreme drought" at Dikwa, a man-made disaster due to the farming population having either fled, been enslaved, or been forced into Rabih's army. Rabih never took measures to revive productive agricultural base in Bornu, despite the situation threatening his continued rule in the region.

The conquest of Bornu and destruction of Kukawa ground the centuries-old trade between Bornu and North Africa to a halt. Rabih attempted various measures and concessions to open up trade with his neighbors, and even with the British Royal Niger Company, but these were largely unsuccessful. The inability to open up trade relations with his neighbors cut off potential supply lines and left Rabih's position in Bornu, surrounded by hostile powers, untenable in the long run. Although isolated and running low on food stores, Rabih and his army maintained a large treasury, built up through taxation and raiding.

=== Geopolitics and army ===
Geopolitically, Rabih largely behaved as the shehus that had preceded him. He worked to maintain the borders of his empire and dominate the various traditional Bornu vassal states that surrounded the imperial core. Rabih planned to embark on further conquests, in particular of the Sokoto Caliphate and the Sultanate of Kano, though these plans would be disrupted by his conflicts with France.

At its height, Rabih's army was one of the best-equipped and best-organised forces in sub-Saharan Africa. In total, there were perhaps 35,000 soldiers stationed throughout the empire, most of them in strategic areas and main cities. The core of Rabih's forces were 3,000 fusiliers, kept at Dikwa under Rabih's personal command.

== War with France ==
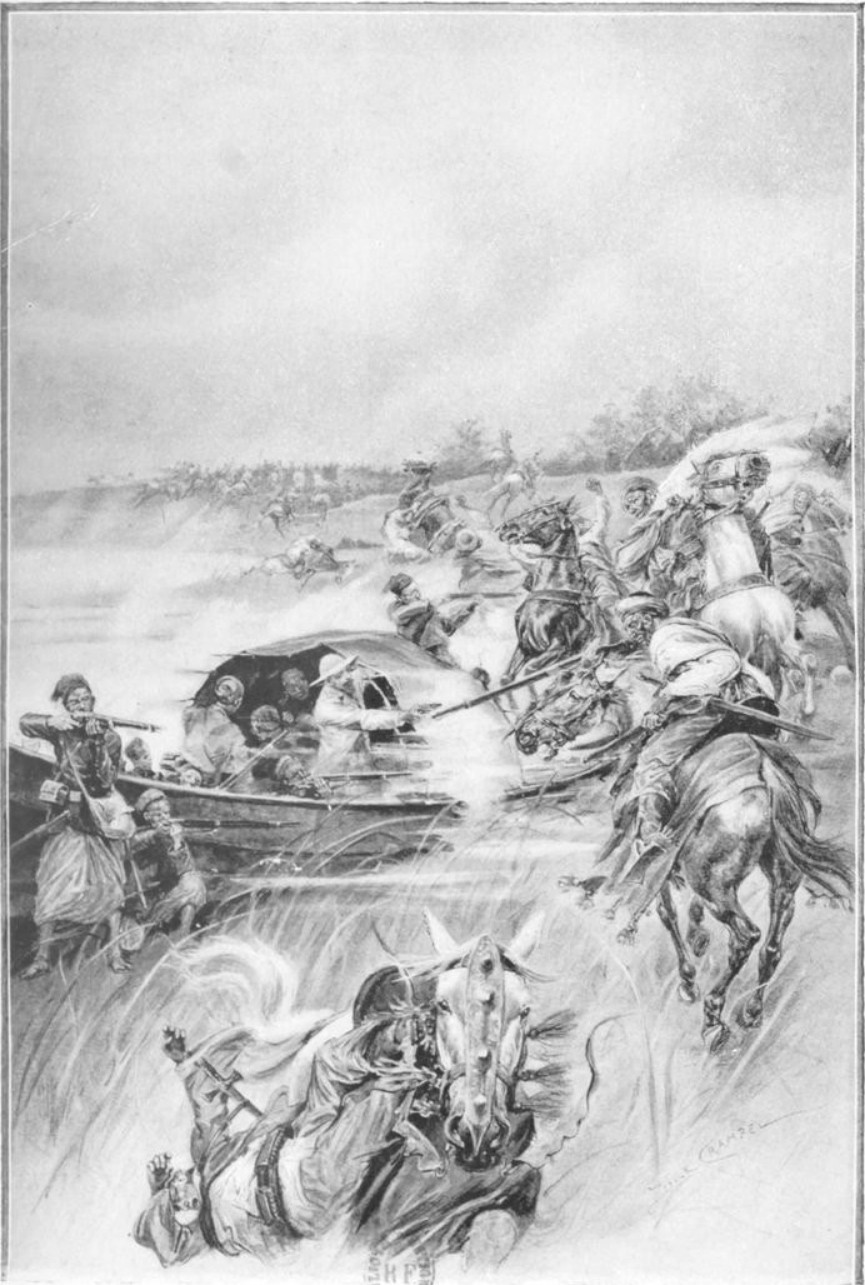
Rabih's forces attack a French party

The fall of the al-Kanemi dynasty and rise of Rabih did not go unnoticed by regional powers, such as the Sokoto Caliphate, or foreign colonial powers, such as France and Britain. Britain chose to recognise Rabih as a legitimate ruler of the Kanem–Bornu Empire, referring to him as the "sultan of Borno", whereas the French opted to deem Rabih illegitimate so that conquests of parts of his empire could be justified. Rabih had not come to the attention of the French until 1893, but his strong empire was seen as an impediment to trade in the area and unsecured territory in terms of French claims during the Scramble for Africa. In French propaganda, Rabih's state was also highlighted as a brutal slave economy and opposition against the African slave trade was appropriated by the French as a justification for war against Rabih.

France sent several expeditions into Central Africa to realise their claims on the region. In 1896, an expedition led by Émile Gentil was sent from Brazzaville to secure Lake Chad. In July 1899, the advance guard of Gentil's expedition, under Henri Bretonnet, reached Rabih's territory, supposedly to aid Bagirmi against Rabih. The French force was massacred at the battle of Togbao and Bretonnet was killed. Rabih's victory led the French to increase their forces. In October 1899, Rabih captured and executed the French explorer Ferdinand de Béhagle, in retaliation for French actions against him.

Further expeditions were sent to consolidate French claims in Sudan and the Sahara and then rendezvous with Gentil. Another Central African expedition, the Voulet–Chanoine Mission, marched by the Niger River in January 1899 and descended into unprecedented brutality and slaughters on their journey through Hausaland, so much so that Lt-Colonel Jean-François Klobb was sent to stop the expedition. Klobb was killed by Captain Paul Voulet and the expedition was only stopped when local African recruits mutinied and killed both French commanders. Another expedition, led by Amédée-François Lamy, defeated the Tuareg but failed to subdue them and then joined with the remains of the Voulet–Chanoine Mission. On the way to join Gentil, the Lamy expedition encountered Sanda Kura of the al-Kanemi dynasty, along with a few hundred followers. Sanda Kura formally asked the French to recognise him as the legitimate ruler of Bornu, and the French expedition agreed after witnessing the support he had from the Bornuan people. Sanda Kura was invested as shehu of Bornu in front of a jubilant crowd on 14 January 1900. On 24 February, the Lamy expedition established a camp on the right bank of the Chari River. The joint French–Bornuan force crossed the river and captured Kousséri, a fortress held by Rabih on the confluence of the Logone and Chari rivers. On 20 April, Gentil's expedition, tired and suffering from diseases, arrived at Kousséri and Gentil was made the local administrator.

As administrator, Gentil authorized Lamy to take command of all the French expeditionary forces and ordered him to destroy Rabih. Sanda Kura was used to sanction the attack, since Dikwa was technically within the agreed-upon German zone of influence in Africa. To get legal reason to invade Rabih's territories, Gentil made Gaourang II of Bagirmi write a letter to Sanda Kura, asking for assistance against Rabih's aggression in Bagirmi. The shehu was then instructed to reply back acknowledging his distress as legitimate. Sanda Kura then authorised Gaourang to join his forces and his allies in Bornu so they could all launch an attack against Rabih. On 22 April, Lamy attacked a fortification held by Rabih and his forces at Lakhta, three miles from Kousséri. During the battle, later known as the battle of Kousséri, Lamy was mortally wounded; he was transformed into a hero in later French propaganda. Rabih's forces were defeated after a few hours of fighting and Rabih attempted to flee the battlefield. During his escape, Rabih was shot and lay dying when he was killed by Abdoulaye Diallo, one of his own former soldiers.

== Legacy ==
=== Remains ===
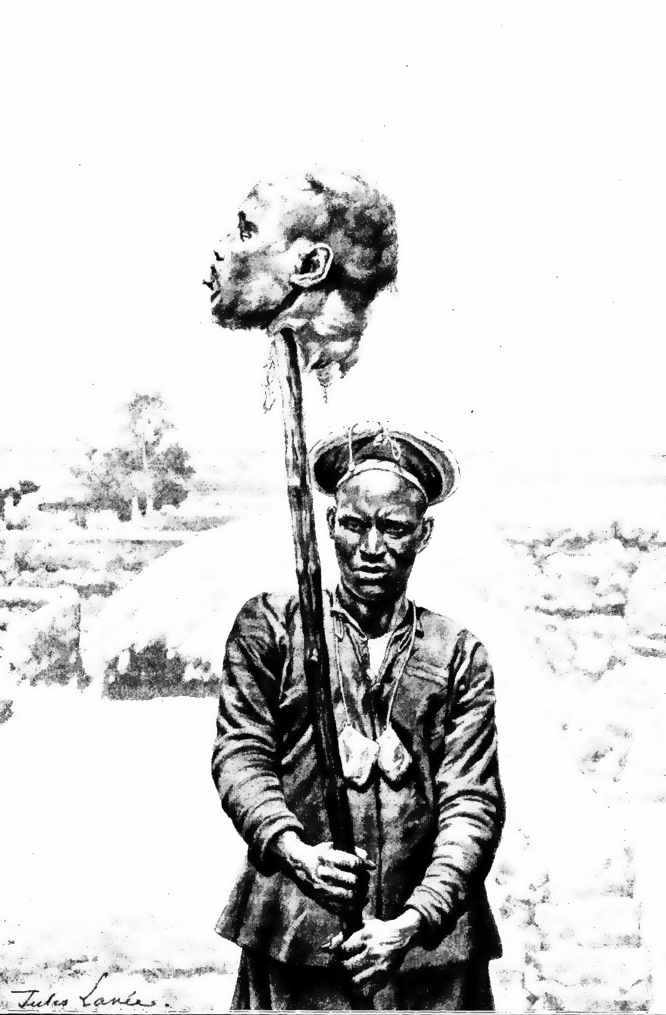
1901 engraving by Jean Lavée of a 1900 photograph of Rabih's head on a pike

Diallo severed Rabih's head and brought it to the dying Lamy to prove Rabih's death. The head was placed on a pike and carried to Kousséri, where it was displayed on the walls. The fate of the rest of Rabih's body is not clear as different accounts tell different versions. Gentil reportedly wished to bury the body, but it was either trampled by the Bagirmi who had fought with the French or thrown in the Chari River. Later in 1900, Rabih's son Fadlallah unsuccessfully requested the restitution of his father's remains.

Rabih's head on a pike was photographed at some point. The identity of the photographer is unknown, but was probably one of the French officers who had participated in the campaign. Many of the officers, including Gentil, are known to have taken photographs during the conflict. The photograph was displayed in Kousséri and circulated within the family and professional network of the French officers that had taken part in the campaign. In March 1901, the photograph was printed uncensored on the front page of the French newspaper L'Illustration. Only one original print of the photograph is known to have survived, found in a booklet once belonging to Émile de Cointet, one of the French soldiers on the campaign. The French artist Jean Lavée produced an engraving of the photograph which was published in Gentil's accounts of the campaign, first in the magazine Le Tour du Monde and then in Gentil's book La chute de l'empire de Rabah ("The Fall of Rabih's Empire").

Rabih's skull was kept after its display at Kousséri and became a French war trophy. The skull was kept in a crate as a trophy by Gentil while he remained in Africa. Gentil at one point opened the crate to show some of the Banda people that Rabih was dead, and promised that the skull of Muhammad al-Sanussi, sultan of Dar al Kuti, would soon join his collection. It was common for European colonial forces in this time to collect human remains in non-European territories after battles, through trade, or through grave robbing, to send back to Europe as anthropological specimens. In late 1900, Gentil sent Rabih's skull to Paris, where it became an anthropological specimen. Photographs were taken of the skull from the front and in profile to be used in anthropological and anatomy teaching. It is possible that Gentil, an avid lecturer at the time, made use of these photographs himself. The photographs are currently kept by the Musée du Quai Branly in Paris. The skull was placed in the collections of the Musée de l'Homme in Paris and is believed to remain there, though its specimen number is apparently unknown.

=== Aftermath and remembrance ===
Rabih's defeat paved the way for French colonisation of Chad. Rabih was one of the last major opponents of the French colonial empire at large and the French made some use of Rabih as a justification for colonialism, pointing to him as an example of the "predatory practices of black populations". After Rabih's defeat, his son Fadlallah continued to fight against the French and was elected by the Zubat al-Kubar as the next emir. Rabih's other son Muhammad Niebe and his daughter Hawwa also took part in the struggle. Fadlallah was killed by the French at Gujba on 23 August 1901. Under the French and British, the shehus were reinstated in Bornu, albeit under colonial suzerainty. The territory of the Kanem–Bornu Empire fell completely under colonial control in 1902.

Rabih is a controversial figure in African history, remembered both as a brutal slave-trader and destroyer of kingdoms, as well as an anti-imperialist nationalist and resistance fighter. Rabih has been referred to as a military genius. Memory of Rabih remained strong in the territories he ruled for decades after his death. Among the people of southern Chad, Rabih's legacy is generally seen as a tragic tale of depopulation and devastation. He has sometimes been called Le Maudit ("the Accursed") and the "Black Sultan". Songs about Rabih and his death were recorded among the Kanuri people in the 1930s and questions of the whereabouts of his skull were reportedly raised among the populace until at least the 1950s. Tales and accounts of Rabih became more frequent in Chad in the 1960s and 1970s, as the country became independent. Populations who were raided by Rabih's forces in the 1870s–1880s, prior to his conquest of Bornu, experienced his death as a great relief, still remembered as such when Nzakara testimonies were collected in the 1950s–1980s. In Bornu itself, Rabih left a divisive and contentious legacy. Kanuri populations still retain a memory of Rabih as a bloodthirsty foreign invader, who was treacherously supported by the Baggara Arabs.
