= Battle of Togbao =

1899 battle

- Part of the Rabih War
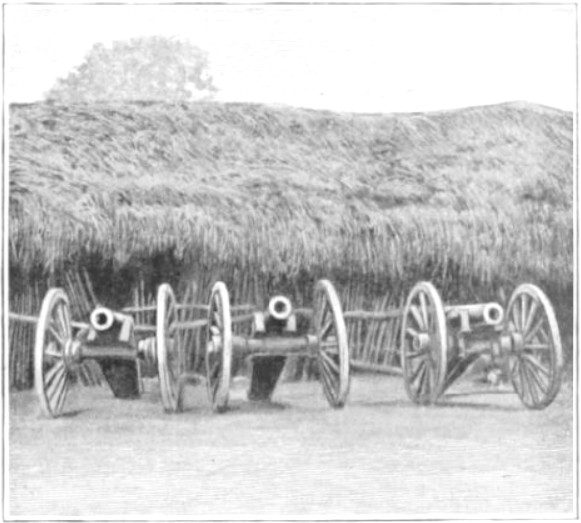
- Three La Hitte guns captured by Rabih during the battle.
Date	17 July 1899
Location	Togbao, near Sarh
Result	Rabih army victory

Belligerents
Rabih Az Zubayr's Empire	France; Sultanate of Bagirmi

Commanders and leaders
Rabih az-Zubayr	Lt. Henri Bretonnet †; Solomon Braun †; Lt. Durand-Autier †; Gaourang II (WIA)

Strength
2,700 men with firearms 10,000 auxiliaires	51 French soldiers 400 Bagirmians; 3 cannons

Casualties and losses
Over 1,000 killed or wounded	48 French soldiers killed 237 Bagirmians killed 3 cannons captured

The battle of Togbao (18 July 1899) was a military confrontation between a French force led by Henri Bretonnet and the forces of the warlord Rabih az-Zubayr, who occupied the Kanem–Bornu Empire. France was supported by a Bagirmian force, led by Gaourang II. The battle was the first engagement of the Rabih War (1899–1901). Rabih defeated the French–Bagirmian force, which increased French determination over the course of the rest of the war.

== Prelude ==
On October 10, 1898, a French military expedition commanded by the Lieutenant de vaisseau Henri Bretonnet and the Lt. Solomon Braun left France directed to Chad, at the time dominated by the Muslim warlord Rabih az-Zubayr. With the missions were the envoys of the Muslim rulers Mohammed al-Senoussi and Gaourang II, sultan of Bagirmi, whom captain Émile Gentil had brought to France a few months earlier.

Shortly after Bretonnet's departure, news arrived that Rabih was attacking Bagirmi to punish it for its alliance with France; as a result, Bretonnet was ordered to reach the high course of the Ubangi River, and there unite with the Bagirmians and wait for instructions and reinforcements.

Passing first by the Congo River and then by the lands controlled by Mohammed al-Senoussi, Bretonnet reached on June 15, 1899 the French post of Kouno and met with Gaourang II. He wrote a letter to Gentil on July 8, 1899. Gentil headed another expedition proceeding shortly behind. Bretonnet wrote that he did not trust the rumours that Rabih in person was marching on Kouno, but all the same asked Gentil to send him Captain Julien with his 130-strong company.

Even when Bretonnet was forced to admit that Rabih was pointing to Kouno, he grossly underestimated the strength of Rabih, claiming in one of his last letters that he only had out-of-date muskets. Instead Rabih had, in Gentil's opinion, a thousand repeating rifles, 500 muzzle-loading rifles and at least 1,500 other firearms. When Rabih arrived at Kouno on July 16, he could count on 2,700 rifles and 10,000 auxiliaries armed with lances and bows. Against them the Bretonnet mission was no match: it consisted of five Frenchmen (the officers Bretonnet, Braun, Durand-Autier, Martin), 44 Senegalese tirailleurs, two Arabs, 20 armed Bakongos, 3 cannons and 400 Bagirmians led by Gaourang II.

== Battle ==
Bretonnet chose to evacuate Kouno and position himself at the nearby hills of Togbao, using the slopes to strengthen his defensive position. On the morning of the next day, July 17, Rabih attacked at 8:00; the first attack was repulsed, but Solomon Braun was killed and Bretonnet wounded so badly he was forced to cede command to lieutenant Durand-Autier. While the second attack was also repulsed, it subjected the Bagirmians to heavy pressure, who began to flee their positions; at this point the third and last assault came, which completely annihilated Bretonnet's column. Gaourang saved himself fleeing, but not before being wounded, with other Bagirmians.

== Aftermath ==
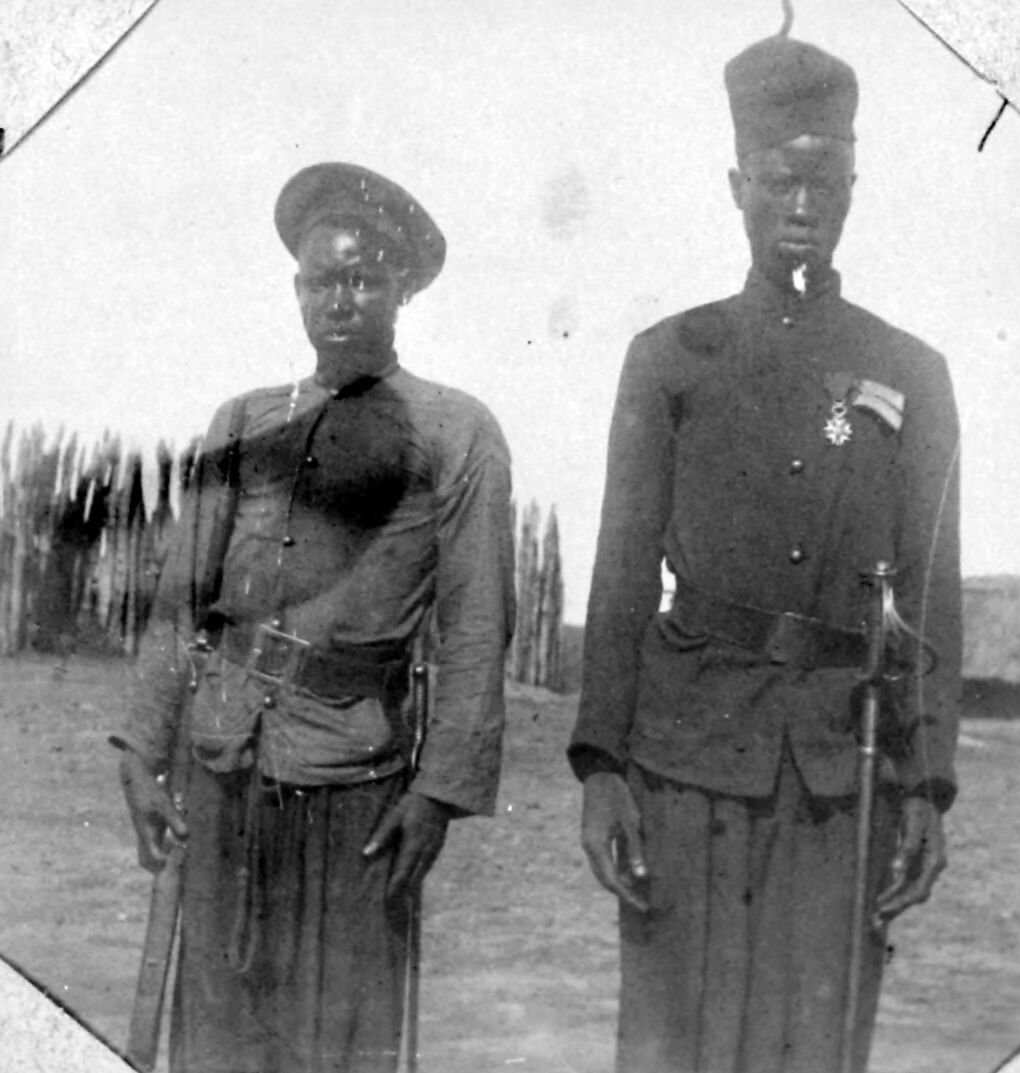
Samba Sall (right), photographed circa 1901 with the Legion of Honour.

Of Bretonnet's mission only three Senegalese survived, who were made prisoners and brought for questioning to Rabih. Bretonnet's three cannons were captured, although they were recovered by the French a year later, during the battle of Kousséri. One of the prisoners, the sergeant Samba Sall, escaped a few days later and reached the village of Gaoura, where on 16 August he met the Gentil Mission, and informed them of the disaster.

The victory was to prove hollow for Rabih for it only strengthened French determination to remove Rabih. Three distinct expeditions marched to southern Chad in 1900 and met at Kousséri to confront Rabih. This was the battle of Kousséri in which Rabih was killed and French possession of Chad guaranteed.
