= Henri Bretonnet =

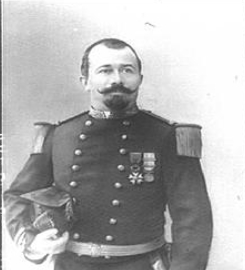
Henri Etienne Bretonnet

Henri-Etienne Bretonnet (1864, Mézières-sur-Seine – 1899) was a French naval officer, killed with most of his men in the battle of Togbao.

== Second Mizon mission ==
Bretonnet entered in the navy by attending the École Navale, the Navy Academy in charge of the education of the officers of the French Navy. Among his first important mission was the participation in the second Mizon Mission in 1892; the expedition was commanded by lieutenant de vaisseau Louis Mizon, who under him Albert Nebout and Bretonnet as enseigne de vaisseau.

The expedition, that was to cover the territories between the Niger River and the Adamawa, was primarily designed to carve a French enclave on the Benue River in Northern Nigeria, a territory that the British claimed being theirs following the Berlin Conference. Ignoring the protests of the Royal Niger Company that Adamawa had been given to the British by the Berlin Conference, he hoisted the French flag in the region after a treaty with the Emir of Muri; unsupported by France, he was forced to leave the area with his men in 1893.

== Mission to Bussa ==
In 1896, Bretonnet, by now promoted lieutenant, was given command of an expedition meant to establish French control on the navigable portions of the Niger River below Bussa, in modern Nigeria. These plans were opposed by the Royal Niger Company, claiming the British had already treaty rights on the region.

Bretonnet left the French post of Carnotville, in Dahomey, on December 28, 1896, and headed north, penetrating in the region of Borgu. Bretonnet passed by Kandi and entered in Illo, where he placed a Resident; then, pointing south, he arrived at Bussa, whose emir Kisan Dogo was involved in a bitter feud with Kibari, ruler of Wawa, that supported a rival claimant to the throne of Bussa. In exchange for the promise of helping Kisan Dogo in removing Kibari and replacing him with a relative of his, Bretonnet held Bussa "in the name of the French Republic" claiming to "occupy effectively the territory of Bussa".

The latter claim was far from true: Kwara, a son of the king of Wawa that Bretonnet had helped to overthrow, guided a rebellion that extended to vast areas of Borgu. Bretonnet was forced to move from one place to another: first at Kandi, then at Illo to help his Resident, then to Bussa to support the emir. A big battle was fought at More, where 1,500 rebels gathered: Bretonnet and Kisan Dogo were victorious, but the Lieutenant lost one of his Europeans in the battle, the Resident of Illo, Carrerot. It was only by 1898 that the French had completely subdued the rebellion.

News of Bretonnet's occupation of Bussa created uproar in London, when the British learned of the situation in April. The French and British governments, after long discussions, reached a compromise that was sanctioned on June 14, 1898, by the Anglo-French Convention; Bretonnet evacuated Bussa, Illo and Gomba, but for purely commercial purposes Great Britain agreed to lease to France two small plots of land on the river - the one on the right bank between Leaba and the mouth of the Moshi River, the other at one of the mouths of the Niger. By accepting this line Great Britain abandoned Nikki and a great part of Borgu as well as some part of Gando to France.

== Death at Togbao ==
In the same year Bretonnet's former roommate at the naval academy, Captain Émile Gentil, who had just returned from his mission to Lake Chad, persuaded the government to give him command of an expedition that would provide to solve the issues that Gentil's departure had left open, and prepare the ground for Gentil's future mission. On October 10 Bretonnet left France, with his second Lt. Solomon Braun; news arrived shortly after that Rabih az-Zubayr, the greatest ruler in the Chad Basin, had attacked Baguirmi, whose king was a French protégé. In France, the government reacted by ordering reinforcements to be sent to Bretonnet, and the preparations for the Gentil Mission were accelerated. Bretonnet was advised to reach the Chari River and unite his forces with those of the Baguirmians.

On June 15 Bretonnet reached the French post of Kouno on the Chari, having with him only half a hundred Senegal riflemen and two officers, but also three cannons, and was shortly after met by Gaourang, the king of Baguirmi, with 400 men. Bretonnet wrote a letter, on July 8, to Gentil, whose expedition had arrived in Middle Congo and was not very distant, in which he wrote that he did not trust the rumours that Rabih in person was marching on Kouno, but all the same asked Gentil to send him Captain Julien with his 130-strong company.

The letter arrived in Gentil's hands when it was already too late; Rabih was effectively marching on Kouno at the head of 2,700 men with firearms and 10,000 auxiliaries. With the enemy approaching, Bretonnet evacuated Kouno and entrenched himself in the nearby hills of Togbao; here on July 17 took place the battle with Rabih's forces, in which Bretonnet, Braun and all his men were massacred, except for three wounded Senegalese that were taken prisoners. One of these escaped, and informed on August 16 Gentil of Bretonnet's death.
