= Fadlallah bin Rabih =

Fadlallah

Emir of the Kanem–Bornu Empire (claimant)
- Reign: 22 April 1900 – 23 August 1901
- Predecessor: Rabih az-Zubayr
- Died: 23 August 1901; Gujba
- Spouse: Hadija bint Muhammad al-Sanusi; Niarinzhe
- Issue: Abd al Mejid; Mahmud
- Father: Rabih az-Zubayr

Fadlallah bin Rabih ruled parts of the Kanem–Bornu Empire in 1900–1901, succeeding his father Rabih az-Zubayr. Fadlallah came to power in the aftermath of his father's defeat and death at the battle of Kousséri and immediately faced an invasion by France, supported by local loyalists of the al-Kanemi dynasty (which had been deposed by Fadlallah's father). Fadlallah secured some British support as ruler of Bornu and enjoyed some success in fighting French forces and their allies but was himself defeated and killed in battle in 1901.

== Background and early life ==
Fadlallah was the son of the Sudanese warlord, slave raider, and adventurer Rabih az-Zubayr. In 1892–1894, Rabih conquered the Kanem–Bornu Empire and displaced its ruling al-Kanemi dynasty. Rabih spent some time in the empire's former capital, Kukawa, before transferring the capital to Dikwa, on account of its better communications and water supply. Rabih's rule was exceptionally brutal, marked by cruel punishments, heavy taxation, and an unprecedented concentration of power. The state was run akin to a military dictatorship, headed by Rabih as amir and a tiny military council (the Zubat al-Kubar). This council, made up of Rabih's close followers and commanders, had elected Rabih as amir in 1879, long before the conquest of Bornu. No important decision was made without the council's approval, though Rabih maintained final say.

The plunder and mass displacement of people under Rabih's rule, combined with the uncertainty created by the conquest, strongly impacted the Bornu economy, especially the agricultural sector. The state's formerly productive agricultural base was destroyed and Rabih proved unable to revive it. The conquest was also a threat to the colonial boundaries and spheres of influence envisioned in negotiations between the United Kingdom, France, and the German Empire. Britain recognised Rabih as a legitimate ruler, calling him the "Sultan of Borno", but the French condemned him as a usurper in order to justify expansion into his lands. In 1899, Rabih executed the French explorer Ferdinand de Béhagle and France invaded the empire, aided by local allies.

Fadlallah had at least two siblings: the brother Muhammad Niebe and the sister Hawwa. Rabih always considered Fadlallah to be his successor, and groomed him for this role. In 1898–1899 while Rabih was absent, Fadlallah served as the regent of Dikwa and all of Bornu. In January–February 1900 he was given command over the town of Gulfei, and after that he was made commander of Karnak Logone (both towns in modern-day Cameroon). Fadlallah impressed virtually all those who met him and was widely known as a courageous and resolute commander. Upon meeting Fadlallah in 1901, the British major Augustus McClintock wrote that "Fadlallah is a young man ... but one who gives the impression that he is the Chief, quiet and dignified with pleasing manners and keenly anxious for the welfare of the people who followed him."

== Emir ==
=== Rise to power (April 1900) ===
In the morning of 22 April 1900, Rabih was defeated and killed by a joint French–Bornuan force at the battle of Kousséri. At the time of his father's death, Fadlallah was less than 25 years old and stationed with some forces at Karnak Logone. Fadlallah learnt of Rabih's death when the first fugitives from the battle reached Karnak-Logone in the afternoon. Late in the evening, Fadlallah and his advisors agreed to abandon Karnak-Logone, despite it being a strong fortress, and unite with the forces of Muhammad Niebe in Dikwa, the capital. Fadlallah's enemies were facing mounting problems, including limited ammunition and French reluctance—the French were unsure if they would be able to withstand a determined counterattack and were nervous about marching into territories that were formally under the British and German colonial spheres of influence in the region—but most of the forces at Karnak-Logone were inexperienced recruits whose morale had been undermined by Rabih's defeat. Fadlallah ordered that anything that could not be carried from Karnak-Logone would be destroyed so that nothing was left for the enemy.

Fadlallah and his party entered Dikwa in the evening of 23 April, where he reunited with Muhammad Niebe and Hawwa. Once the majority of his troops had arrived after him, Fadlallah had them fed and paraded and held a speech, during which he claimed that "Rabih had not been killed in defeat by the French; rather, he had decided that his time had come. Death was his own choice." By April 1900, Rabih's original military council had been decimated and only the valued counsellor Faqih Ahmad al-Kabir may have been influential enough to succeed over Fadlallah, though he lacked the ambition. Fadlallah was thus accepted as Rabih's successor without any internal opposition.

=== First French pursuit (April–May 1900) ===
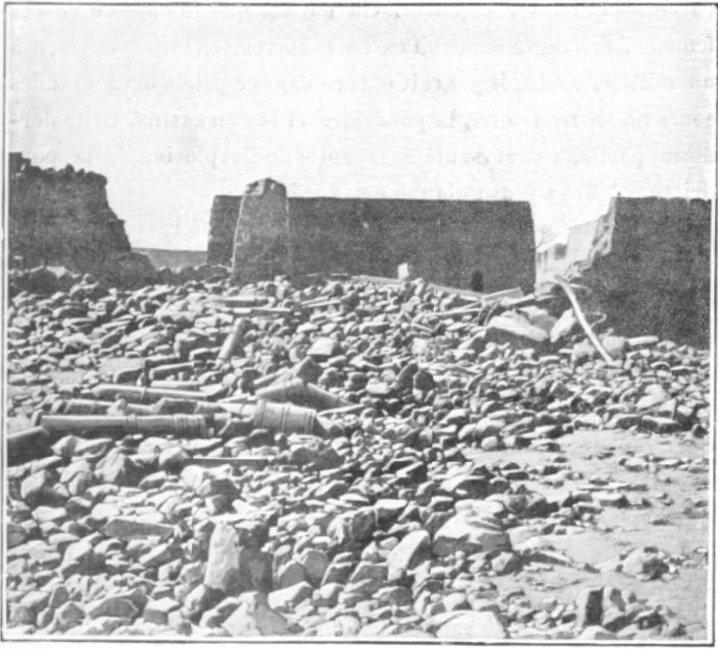
Ruins of Rabih's former palace after the explosion at Dikwa

News of a French advance on Dikwa soon reached Dikwa, and Fadlallah organised a meeting to seek the council's advise in the evening of 30 April. They decided to evacuate Dikwa and withdraw, despite the exhausted French being vulnerable to attack. Fadlallah collected his family and property in the capital. Any valuables, food, and ammunition that could be carried were sent off with an advance guard, while the rest of the storehouses were opened to the general populace. Fadlallah ordered that everything else was to be destroyed, though this order was out of confusion not carried out. Fadlallah then retreated south with an army numbering 5,000, also accompanied by thousands of non-combatants, including women and children. The French occupied Dikwa soon thereafter and installed the shehu Sanda Kura, of the al-Kanemi dynasty, as Bornu's new ruler there. French pursuit of Fadlallah's group was delayed by a massive explosion from Dikwa's armory, perhaps rigged by Fadlallah's followers.

In the evening of 31 April, Fadlallah reached Dagumba, near Shigabaya, 40 kilometres south of Dikwa. Progress for the large party had been slow due to stragglers coming under attack from Baggara Arabs, aligned with the French or acting on their own volition, and most women and children being on foot. French forces reached the party at this time and were able to get close since no guards had been posted; it had been assumed by Fadlallah and his advisors that the French would rest before following them and that guards were thus unnecessary. The ensuing battle lasted less than an hour and was a French victory, partly due to panic among the non-combatants making the defense difficult. In his retreat from the battle, Fadlallah lost the bulk of his powder and ammunition, ten battlefield standards, over 300 guns, and 10,000 Maria Theresa thalers from his treasury. The French also managed to kill Faqih Ahmad al-Kabir and take the wives and families of many of his officers and soldiers captive. Fadlallah's own wives Hadija and Niarinzhe, his harem, and his sons Abd al Mejid and Mahmud were all taken captive and brought back to Dikwa by the French.

The French lacked sufficient cavalry to pursue Fadlallah's group further as they retreated from the battle. He made quick progress through the valley of the Yedseram river and soon reached lands close to the border with the Mandara Kingdom. It became clear that the French were not in immediate pursuit and Fadlallah thus slowed down to allow stragglers to rejoin the group. On 5 May, a small French party caught up with Fadlallah's camp but his forces easily withstood an attempted night attack. Fadlallah's party suffered from dwindling supplies and ammunition and were denied entry into Mandara by Sultan Umar Adjara. On the dawn of 9 May, a greater French party led by René Reibell, with 148 men and a Hotchkiss gun, reached Fadlallah's camp. The French surprise attacked the camp and won a decisive victory. Reibell reported that less than two hundred had escaped and could prove his claims through the capture of numerous soldiers, women, and children, two standards, and more than a hundred guns. Reibell's party returned to Dikwa on 13 May.

On 16 May, the French forces abandoned their presence in Dikwa, transferring their base of operations to Kousséri. The French campaign against Rabih and Fadlallah was officially ended the day after Reibell reached Kousséri. The French forces soon moved across the Chari River and founded Fort-Lamy (modern-day N'Djamena) as the nucleus of their power in Chad. On 5 June, Émile Gentil and shehu Sanda Kura travelled to Dikwa, where Sanda Kura was settled in Rabih's former royal palace. Gentil was much impressed with the city.

=== Recovery (May–November 1900) ===
After the defeat on 9 May, Fadlallah retreated further up the Yedseram valley. Although suffering from a severe lack of morale and supplies, his forces still had four hundred repeating rifles. All who remained by his side were disciplined elite warriors, as all others had either died, deserted, or been captured by this point. They made camp in the region of Mubi, where they were gradually joined by survivors from the previous defeats. By early July, Fadlallah commanded almost 5,000 men and had 1,000 horses. Rumors began to spread into French-held territories that Fadlallah and Muhammad Niebe had taken to the field with a large force, intent on reconquering Bornu. False rumors also spread that Fadlallah was seeking to join Muhammad al-Mahdi as-Senussi. The army was sustained mainly through raids for supplies. Fadlallah attempted to secure alliances with Zubeiru of the Adamawa Emirate, though Zubeiru rejected his proposals.

After suffering some desertions, Fadlallah sent a messenger to W.P. Hewby, the British representative of the Royal Niger Company at Ibi. The letter explained the recent series of events and Fadlallah's plight, and requested entry into British-held territories and protection from the French forces. The letter reached Hewby on 4 August and was translated by 7 August. In his replies, Hewby assured Fadlallah British protection if he kept westward of the line establishing the border of British and French colonial spheres of influence and added that the French had not had any right to pursue him as far as they had, and that the British were displeased with Zubeiru's rejection of an alliance. Fadlallah moved into the lands of the Kilba people and built a camp at Pella. His forces raided the surrounding countryside for supplies. Although some captives were also taken, they were returned for ransoms of grain, horses, or cattle. In the middle of October, the entire force moved north, raiding as they traveled. At Chibok there was a large battle with the locals and Fadlallah failed to take the town. His sister Hawwa was by this point commanding one of his regiments, reportedly dressed as a man, and distinguished herself in the fighting. In late October, the army reached Marguba, around 35 milometres south-west of Magumeri. At Marguba they learnt that the French had deposed shehu Sanda Kura and replaced him with his brother, Abubakar Garbai. They also learnt that the French no longer had a military presence at Dikwa, having left Abubakar Garbai there after learning that Fadlallah was supported by Britain. Abubakar Garbai faced mounting problems at Dikwa; the return of the shehus had been welcomed at first, but both Sanda Kura and Abubakar Garbai had been forced to extort the populace for funds, partly to pay the French. Several al-Kanemi dynasts had also returned to Dikwa, many of whom could challenge Abubakar Garbai for the throne.

Fadlallah soon learnt that Abubakar Garbai had sent an army led by the eunuch Mestrema Musa to take the city of Maiduguri, within the British sphere of influence. Fadlallah rapidly marched to Maiduguri, reaching the town at dawn on 26 November. Muhammad Niebe was left with a hundred guns and built a base camp, where the women and children were gathered. Fadlallah then led his forces against Mestrema Musa's army, which numbered 1,500. Musa was made to retreat after suffering heavy casualties, while Fadlallah had lost only three men. Fadlallah had Maiduguri burnt and marched on Dikwa. Abubakar Garbai and most of Dikwa's population fled to Ngala and Fadlallah retook the capital without opposition on 30 November.

=== Second French pursuit (November 1900–January 1901) ===
Abubakar Garbai requested support from the French general Félix Adolphe Robillot but the French faced difficulties in consolidating their forces in order to face Fadlallah. Robillot advised Abubakar Garbai to withdraw to securely French territory and made offers of peace to Fadlallah. Abubakar Garbai swore to defend Ngala to his death. Fadlallah reached Ngala with his army at dawn on 6 December. Although Abubakar Garbai commanded a larger army, Fadlallah defeated him. 300 of Abubakar Garbai's men died in the fighting and the survivors were scattered or captured and taken back to Dikwa. Ngala was burnt. Fadlallah freed all prisoners who were of Hausa origin, since they were now considered British subjects. Abubakar Garbai went missing for two months after the battle, having fled to Kanem, and in the meantime his relative Masta Gumsumi was made shehu. Robillot learnt of Abubakar Garbai's defeat, that Fadlallah had executed his messengers, that many of the locals were enthusiastically welcoming Fadlallah's return, and that some of Rabih surviving former officers were defecting from the French to Fadlallah's side. Robillot determined that inaction would result in a loss of "French prestige", especially considering that Britain had given Fadlallah protection.

Robillot gathered a force and marched on Dikwa, occupying the city on 31 December. Fadlallah had evacuated Dikwa shortly before. French propaganda claimed that Fadlallah had abandoned Dikwa and fled at their advance, though Fadlallah had earlier already announced his intention to leave and rejoin Muhammad Niebe at their fortified camp by Maiduguri. Fadlallah had probably not intended to permanently hold on to Dikwa, but rather to remain in British territory. Fadlallah and Muhammad Niebe soon left Maiduguri. At noon on 10 January, the cavalry of Robillot's army reached Fadlallah's forces and attacked. Fadlallah defeated the French forces and continued his journey south-west, crossing the Gongola River on 15 January. He returned, crossing the river again, on 17 January and established a fortified encampment at Gwani, in the land of the Tera people. Robillot reached the town of Balaraba on 12 January but gave up his pursuit there since the lands further on were too difficult to navigate and Fadlallah had left Bornuan territory.

=== British support, defeat and death (January–August 1901) ===
Gwani was under control of the religious zealot Jibril Gaini. Gaini and Fadlallah were initially friendly, but Gaini turned on Fadlallah in February, going so far as attacking and enslaving some of his followers. The cause of the conflict was probably that Fadlallah, whose followers now numbered nearly 10,000, had once more been forced to raid for food. Fadlallah wrote to Hewby again, affirming himself as a British vassal and subject. He pleaded for further British assistance and tried to secure British support as sultan of Bornu, writing "If you agree with me, restore me to my right. Let your chief decide upon my country and inform the population of my standing." The British were sympathetic to Fadlallah since supporting him had the potential to extend British influence into Chad at a minimal cost. William Wallace of the Royal Niger Company sent Major Augustus McClintock to support Fadlallah, provided his army did not move into the French or German spheres of influence in the region.

Fadlallah left Gwani and traveled first to Fika and then to Burguma, from which he watched the movements of the French and Abubakar Garbai, now returned to power. A British party led by McClintock reached Fadlallah at Burguma on 20 June and was given a great reception. McClintock spent three weeks with Fadlallah's forces, during which he often spoke with Fadlallah and took many notes of his requests and requests by his council. Fadlallah requested British support to retake Dikwa, recognition as the emir of Bornu, and British protection against French attacks. McClintock could not make any promises on behalf of Britain and left on 16 July. McClintock intended to recommend that Fadlallah be invested as the emir of Bornu.

Fadlallah sent two officers, Idi and Abu Qarqar, ahead to raid in the direction of Dikwa and prepare the capital for his return. On 7 August, a French force of 100 cavalry and 250 infantry, led by Georges Destenave, advanced to Dikwa from the south and launched a surprise attack on the raiding party, killing Idi. Destenave marched on Burguma but the town had been abandoned. Once Fadlallah learnt of the French advance, he sent Muhammad Niebe with the supplies and non-combatants to the town of Gujba, where he joined them a week later, on 21 August. On 23 August, the advance guard of the French army, led by Captain Dangeville, reached Gujba and attacked. Fadlallah ordered Muhammad Niebe and the women to flee to Mutwe, setting aside 300 soldiers to cover their escape. Soon thereafter, a French sharpshooter spotted Fadlallah and shot him in the chest, killing him.

== Aftermath ==
Fadlallah's body was brought to Mutwe and buried there. When the French reached Mutwe they dug up the body; Fadlallah's head and hands were severed and put up on poles. The head was later embalmed in salt and brought to Dikwa, where it was exhibited for some time. Muhammad Niebe, Hawwa, and some followers tried to retreat to Fika but were unable to find the way and were eventually forced to surrender to the French out of hunger and thirst. Fadlallah's army was scattered; most survivors were captured and taken to French Chad. Some of those who escaped either managed to settle in Fika or were captured and enslaved by Jibril Gaini.

Fadlallah's death sparked strong reactions from Britain and Germany, who protested French military operations within their own spheres of influence. In the interests of European cooperation the affair was however soon largely forgotten by the colonial powers.
