= Baguirmi Department =

Department of Chari-Baguirmi, Chad

Coordinates: 11°23′54″N 16°10′03″E

Baguirmi (Arabic: باقرمي) is a department of Chad, one of three in the Chari-Baguirmi Region. It takes its name from the kingdom of Baguirmi. Its capital is Massenya.

== Geography ==
The surface of the department, which lies about 1,000 feet (300 m) above sea-level, is almost flat with a very slight inclination north to Lake Chad. It forms part of what seems to be the basin of an immense lake, of which Chad is the remnant. The soil is clay. Numerous tributaries of the river Chari River flow through the department, but much of the water is absorbed by swamps and sand-obstructed channels, and seasons of drought are recurrent. The southern part of the district is the most fertile.

Under French colonial rule the capital was Chekna, on a tributary of the Chari. Fort Lamy (actually N'Djamena) at the confluence of the Logone and Chari, and Fort de Cointet on the middle Shari, were French outposts around which towns grew.

== Native fauna and flora ==
Among the trees the acacia and the dum-palm are common. Various kinds of rubber vine are found. Rice grows wild, as do several kinds of Poa grass (both of which are also cultivated). The fauna includes the elephant, hippopotamus, lion and several species of antelope. Ants are very numerous.

== History ==
The Bagirmese according to their own traditions, came from the east several centuries ago, a tradition borne out by their language, which resembles those spoken on the White Nile. On their arrival they appear to have taken the place of the Bulala dynasty. They subdued the Fula and Arabs already settled in the district, and after being converted to Islam under Abdullah, their fourth king (about 1600), they extended their authority over a large number of tribes living to the south and east. The most important of these tribes were the Saras, Gaberi, Somrai, Gulla, Nduka, Nuba and Sokoro, who were repeatedly raided by the Bagirmese for slaves.

In 1911 polygamy was still general in upper Bagirmi, where some traces of a matriarchal stage of society lingered, one small state being called Beled-el-Mra, "Women's Land", because its ruler was always a queen.

Bagirmi became known to Europe by the travels of Dixon Denham (1823), Heinrich Earth (1852), who was imprisoned by the Bagirmese for some time, Gustav Nachtigal (1872), and P. Matteucci and A. M. Massari (1881). The country in 1871 had been conquered by the sultan of Wadai, and about 1890 was over-run by Rabah Zobeir who subsequently removed farther west to Bornu. About this time French interest in the countries surrounding Lake Chad was aroused. The first expedition led thither through Bagirmi met with disaster, its leader, Paul Crampel, being killed by order of Rabah.

Subsequent French missions were more fortunate, and in 1897 Emile Gentil, the French commissioner for the district, concluded a treaty with the sultan of Bagirmi, placing his country under French protection. A resident was left at the capital, Massenya, but on Gentil's withdrawal Rabah descended from Bornu and forced sultan and resident to flee. It was not until after the death of Rabah in battle and the rout of his sons (1901) that French authority was firmly established. Kanem, a country north of Bagirmi and subject in turn to it and to Wadai, was at the same time brought under French control. So far as its European rivals are concerned, the French right to these regions was based on the Franco-German convention of 15 March 1894 and the Anglo-French declaration of 21 March 1899.

The population in 1903 was estimated at 200,000, having been greatly reduced as the result of wars and slave-raiding. There is also an ancient caravan route which runs through Kanem and across the Sahara to Tripoli.

== See also ==
- List of rulers of Bagirmi
- Departments of Chad
