= Paul Bourdarie =

French explorer (1864–1950)

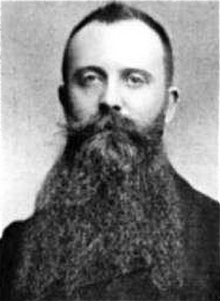
- Born: 19 July 1864; Montfaucon, Lot, France
- Died: 21 February 1950 (aged 85); Vayrac, Lot, France
- Occupations: Explorer, journalist

Paul Bourdarie (19 July 1864 – 21 February 1950) was a French explorer, journalist, lecturer and professor. He became known as a specialist in colonial topics and gave lectures on subjects such as growing cotton and domesticating African elephants. He believed in a liberal policy regarding the indigenous people of the French colonies. Bourdarie was one of those responsible for founding the Grand Mosque of Paris.

== Early years (1864–1894) ==
Paul Bourdarie was born on 19 July 1864, in Montfaucon, Lot. In 1893, he left on a study mission in the Congo. His report described the culture of the lime growers of Gabon, the need to establish experimental farms, and construction of a port at Pointe-Noire that would be the terminus of the railway from Brazzaville. To avoid using porters at a time when tractors had not yet been invented he advocated domestication of African elephants. The problems of rubber collection that he described caused the Minister of the Colonies and the Museum to import Hevea brasiliensis to Guinea, Ivory Coast and Dahomey, and Palaquium gutta to Gabon.

== African Society (1894–1897) ==
From 1894 to 1897, Bourdarie was secretary general of the Société africaine de France (African Society of France) founded by Admiral Vallon and Doctor Verrier. In 1895, he was candidate for the Gabon-Congo delegation to the French Africa Committee, representing the colonists, and raised questions about Pierre Savorgnan de Brazza's approach to colonization. In 1897, in La France Noire, Bourdarie acknowledged Brazza's honesty and his contribution to the French Congo colony but opposed his appointment as Commissioner General of the colony on the basis of his lack of tact and the opposition he had raised among the colonists,

In 1895, the Algerian Arab interpreter Djebari claimed that survivors from the Flatters expedition were still being held prisoner by the Tuaregs at the oasis of Taoua. A committee of African experts was formed to examine these claims. It included Colonel Ludovic de Polignac, who had helped to negotiate the Ghadames treaty of 1862; Jean-Marie Bayol, former Lieutenant-Governor of Dahomey; the explorers Gaston Donnet, Bernard d'Attanoux and Ferdinand de Béhagle; and Paul Bourdarie.

Bourdarie and Ferdinand de Béhagle made speeches to the Société africaine de France in which they stressed the importance of the French colonists making a military "association" with the natives for defense of the colonies. Bourdarie prepared the Chad expedition of Ferdinand de Béhagle, who was hanged in 1899 in Dikoa by the order of Rabih az-Zubayr. Bourdarie then undertook the repatriation of the mission of Béhagle and Albert Bonnel de Mézières^{(fr)}. In the course of this mission, he proposed construction of railway around the Bangui rapids.

== Journalist and lecturer (1897–1908) ==
In 1896, Bourdarie succeeded Béhagle in taking charge of the "Colonies and Protectorates" column in the newspaper La France, where he wrote a personal column "The art of colonizing." From 1896 to 1898, Bourdarie gave lecture tours on the domestication of elephants in Africa. After a lecture tour in Belgium he was received on 25 May 1898 by Leopold II, who charged Captain Laplume to inquire on the trials of domesticating elephants undertaken at Fernan Vaz by the Fathers of the Holy Spirit. In 1904 and 1905, he talked in the French textile industry centers on establishing cotton cultivation in Africa.

In 1906, Bourdarie founded the Revue indigène to promote a liberal policy for treatment of indigenous people. The Revue indigène: Organe des intérêts des ineligènes aux colonies et pays de protectorat was published in Paris from 1906 to 1932 under his direction. It advocated respect for the institutions and authorities of the colonized societies, gradual modernization at their own pace through collaboration between traditional elites and the colonial authorities, with progressive granting of political rights including the vote and French citizenship, while letting the colonized peoples retain their traditional laws, customs and culture. The periodical was read by many North African Muslims.

== Professor (1908–1920) ==
In 1908 Bourdarie was appointed professor at the Collège libre des sciences sociales^{(fr)} (Free College of Social Sciences) under the direction of Ernest Delbet^{(fr)}. Until 1914, he taught courses on the history and sociology of French Equatorial Africa. In 1909, Bourdarie and Professor Paul Pellet of the École des Sciences Politiques founded the Souvenir colonial français to create bronze plates that marked the deeds of the French overseas. In 1910, he made a trip to Tunisia, where the Revue indigène was read by many of the Tunisians as an alternative to the propaganda of the colons. From 1914 to 1920, he lectured on current events, politics and "the colonial lessons of war". In 1915, Bourdarie originated the project to found the Grand Mosque of Paris with an associated Muslim Institute. At the invitation of the Resident General he made a trip to Morocco in 1916 and visited Casablanca, Rabat, Marrakesh, Fez, Taza, Mazagan and Safi.

== Other activities (1919–1950) ==
Bourdarie was general delegate of the Association cotonnière coloniale^{(fr)} (Colonial Cotton Association) from 1917 to 1921. In 1919, he was chairman of the League of Nations Division for Colonial and Foreign Affairs and supported the independence of Azerbaijan and Georgia from Russia. In 1920, Bourdarie was appointed to the Conseil supérieur des Colonies. At this time Bourdarie, Governor Alfred Albert Martineau and Maurice Delafosse began the process of creating the Académie des sciences coloniales (Academy of Colonial Sciences), now the Académie des sciences d'outre-mer (Academy of overseas sciences). On 8 July 1922, he was appointed permanent secretary of the Academy.

In 1928, Bourdarie was decorated as Officer of Public Instruction. In 1929, he was appointed to the Transaharian Railway Study Committee. In 1930, he was a member of the Higher Council of the Exposition coloniale internationale (Paris Colonial Exposition). In 1938, he was appointed to the Upper Scientific Committee of the French Institute of Black Africa. In 1939, Bourdarie was awarded the grand prize of the Académie française. During World War II, Bourdarie continued the work of the Académie des sciences coloniales in 1939–40, moved to his house at Vayrac when the Germans advanced, then returned to Paris. In 1943, he resigned from his position as permanent secretary of the Academy and returned to Veyrac, where he lived until his death on 21 February 1950, aged 85, in Vayrac.

== Publications ==
Bourdarie published many articles, reports and speeches. A selection follows.

- Paul Bourdarie, Les Chemins de fer du Congo et du Centre-Afrique (Extrait des 'Questions diplomatiques et coloniales'), Paris: impr. de F. Levé, p. 33
- Paul Bourdarie (1894), A la Côte du Congo français (notes et impressions) (conférence faite à la Société africaine de France, décembre 1893), Paris: Librairie africaine, p. 32
- Paul Bourdarie (1896), La Domestication de l'éléphant d'Afrique, par Paul Bourdarie (Extrait du "Bulletin de la Société nationale d'acclimatation de France". Mars-avril 1896), Paris: Société nationale d'acclimatation de France, p. 23
- Paul Bourdarie (1898), L'Éléphant d'Afrique, mesures internationales de protection (Extrait du "Compte rendu du Congrès international de Bruxelles". 1897), Bruxelles: Impr. des travaux publics, p. 27
- Paul Bourdarie (1899), Fachoda, la mission Marchand, la question d'Égypte, le Bahr-el-Ghazal, la convention du 21 mars 1899, Paris: impr. de F. Levé, p. 32
- Paul Bourdarie (1901), "Le Congo français, histoire, géographie, colonisation", Bulletin de la Société amicale des originaires du Lot (conférence faite en la salle de la Société de géographie, le 27 mars 1901), Paris: impr. de L. Duc: 50
- Paul Bourdarie (1904), Trois Figures d'Afrique : Ferdinand de Béhagle, explorateur; Alexis Rousset, administrateur colonial; Lucien Dyé, sous-lieutenant d'infanterie coloniale (Extrait de "la France de demain"), Paris, p. 24
- Paul Bourdarie (1904), Marcel Ruedel (ed.), La Colonisation belge, Bibliothèque de la France coloniale moderne, Paris: Société de l"Annuaire colonial', p. 24
- Paul Bourdarie (1906), Les Problèmes de la politique indigène et économique du Congo français (Extrait du "Bulletin de la Société normande de géographie". 2e cahier de 1906), Rouen : Impr. de L. Gy, p. 27
- Paul Bourdarie (1916), La Grande guerre considérée au point de vue colonial. La Lutte des impérialismes coloniaux (Publié par la 'Revue des questions coloniales et maritimes' et la 'Revue indigène'. 1916), Thouars: Impr. nouvelle, p. 23
- Paul Bourdarie (1916), Les affaires de Turquie et la leçon coloniale des Balkans (Extrait de la "Revue indigène", nos de nov.-déc. 1912, janvier, avril, mai 1913), Paris: aux bureaux de la "Revue indigène", p. 139
- Paul Bourdarie (1920), L'Institut musulman et la mosquée de Paris (Extrait de la "Revue indigène", octobre-décembre 1919), Thouars: Impr. nouvelle, p. 16
- Paul Bourdarie (1921), Une politique coloniale française, Paris: Bibliothèque de la "Revue indigène", p. 43
- Paul Bourdarie (1922), L'Exploitation du domaine colonial. Un projet de collaboration étrangère, Thouars, Paris: Impr. nouvelle / Bibliothèque de la 'Revue des questions coloniales et maritimes', p. 20
- Paul Bourdarie (1922), L'Angleterre, l'Egypte et l'Hinde. L'Islam et la Politique internationale, Thouars, Paris: Impr. nouvelle / Bibliothèque de la 'Revue indigène', p. 32
- Paul Bourdarie (6 March 1934), Notice sur les titres, les travaux et l'action coloniale, Paris: Impr. Jouve; Société d'éditions géographiques, maritimes et coloniales, p. 30

== Taxon named in his honor ==
The fish Enteromius bourdariei (Pellegrin, 1928) is named in Bourdarie's honor.

== Sources ==
- Betts, Raymond F. (1960), Assimilation and Association in French Colonial Theory, 1890–1914, U of Nebraska Press, ISBN 0-8032-6247-7
- Bloom, Peter J. (2008), French Colonial Documentary: Mythologies of Humanitarianism, U of Minnesota Press, ISBN 978-0-8166-4628-9
- BOURDARIE Paul (in French), Académie des sciences d'outre-mer, archived from the original on 2015-12-08
- Cornevin, Robert (1975–1989), "Paul BOURDARIE (1864–1950)" (PDF), Hommes et destines : Dictionnaire biographique d'Outre-Mer (in French)
- Hasanli, Jamil (2015-12-16), Foreign Policy of the Republic of Azerbaijan: The Difficult Road to Western Integration, 1918–1920, Routledge, ISBN 978-1-317-36617-1
- Kanya-Forstner, A. S. (1994), "French Missions to the Central Sudan in the 1890s: The Role of Algerian Agents and Interpreters", Paideuma: Mitteilungen zur Kulturkunde, 40, The Sokoto Caliphate and the European Powers 1890–1907, Frobenius Institute: 15–35, JSTOR 40341674
- Manchuelle, François (1995), "Assimilés ou patriotes africains? Naissance du nationalisme culturel en Afrique française (1853–1931)", Cahiers d'Études Africaines (in French), 35 (138/139), EHESS: 333–368, doi:10.3406/cea.1995.1453, JSTOR 4392601
- Michel, Marc (1967), "Autour de la Mission Marchand: Le rappel de Brazza en 1897", Cahiers d'Études Africaines (in French), 7 (25), EHESS: 152–185, doi:10.3406/cea.1967.3091, JSTOR 4390955
- Paul BOURDARIE (in French), Académie française
- Paul Bourdarie (1864–1950) – Auteur du texte (in French), BnF: Bibliotheque nationale de France
- Scharpf, Christopher & Lazara, Kenneth J. (22 September 2018). "Order CYPRINIFORMES: Family CYPRINIDAE: Subfamily SMILIOGASTRINAE". The ETYFish Project Fish Name Etymology Database. Christopher Scharpf and Kenneth J. Lazara. Archived from the original on 4 May 2022.
