= Enteromius bourdariei =

Conservation status
- Endangered (IUCN 3.1)

Scientific classification
- Domain: Eukaryota
- Kingdom: Animalia
- Phylum: Chordata
- Class: Actinopterygii
- Order: Cypriniformes
- Family: Cyprinidae
- Subfamily: Smiliogastrinae
- Genus: Enteromius
- Species: E. bourdariei

Binomial name
- Enteromius bourdariei (Pellegrin, 1928)

Synonyms
- Barbus bourdariei Pellegrin, 1928

Species of fish

Enteromius bourdariei is a species of ray-finned fish in the genus Enteromius which ha so far only been recorded in the Noun River and Lake Monoun in Cameroon.

== Size ==
This species reaches a length of 10.8 cm (4.3 in).

== Etymology ==
The fish is named in honor of Paul Bourdarie (1864-1950), the co-founder and permanent secretary of l’Académie des Sciences Coloniales, now known as Académie des sciences d'outre-mer, a society dedicated to the history and geography of Africa, Latin America, Asia and Oceania.
