= Ludovic de Polignac =

French soldier and explorer

Charles Ludovic Marie de Polignac
- Ludovic de Polignac from the frontispiece of Gabriel Esquer's 1930 biography Un Saharien
- Born: 24 March 1828; London, England, United Kingdom of Great Britain and Ireland
- Died: 13 January 1904 (aged 75); Bouzaréah, French Algeria
- Occupation: Soldier
- Spouse: Gabrielle Henriette Prinzessin von Croÿ (m. 1874)
- Parent(s): Jules de Polignac; Mary Charlotte Parkyns

Charles Ludovic Marie de Polignac (24 March 1828 – 13 January 1904) was a French soldier and explorer who spent much of his career in French Algeria. He is known for negotiating a treaty with the Tuareg people in 1862. He dreamed of creating a huge French empire in north and central Africa with the support of the Tuaregs and Arabs, and came to believe that the Jews and the British were conspiring against France.

== Early years ==
Charles Ludovic ("Louis") Marie de Polignac was born in London, England on 24 March 1828. His parents were Jules de Polignac (1780–1847), Prime Minister and Minister of Foreign Affairs from 1829 to 1830, and Mary Charlotte Parkyns (1792–1864), daughter of Thomas Parkyns, 1st Baron Rancliffe. His father left his widow comfortably off, but not wealthy. His younger brother, Prince Edmond de Polignac, became a composer. Polignac entered the École Polytechnique in 1851. He later pursued a military career in Algeria. In 1855 he was a sub-lieutenant in the 59th line regiment. Polignac thought that France should obtain an empire in Africa that extended from Algeria to the Niger River, and thus become a world power that could rival Britain.

== Ghadames treaty ==
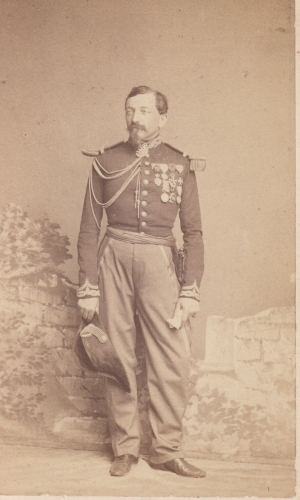
Hippolyte Mircher, leader of the mission to Ghadames

Polignac helped to negotiate the Ghadames treaty of 1862. Ghadames is a mainly Berber town in northwest Libya near the borders with Algeria and Tunisia. It was independent until 1830 when it became a dependency of Tunisia and then of the Turkish empire. The Europeans noted its commercial importance. The governor of Algeria, Marshal Aimable Pélissier, decided to send a mission to Ghadames to make an official treaty with the Kel Ajjer Tuaregs. (Note: The Tuareg are a Berber-speaking people of southern Algeria, southwest Libya, Burkino Faso, Niger and Mali who were traditionally nomadic pastoralists.) The political aspects were entrusted to Commander Hippolyte Mircher as chief and Captain de Polignac, both of whom were familiar with Algerian Moslems. They were accompanied by the mining engineer Vatonne, the army doctor Hoffman and the military interpreter Isma'yl Bou Derba.

The mission left Tripoli in October 1862 and travelled south to the oasis of Ghadames. There they met with Tuareg chiefs of the ruling Araghen tribe, and quickly agreed on a convention that supported friendly intercourse between the two nations, protection to the Tuareg in Algeria and to the French in Tuareg country, and trade between the Tuaregs and Algeria. The treaty was signed on 29 November 1862. After leaving Ghadames the mission travelled northwest past the Ghardaya well and through the Wadi Souf to the town of Biskra in Algeria. Vatonne and Polignac surveyed the route of the expedition.

The report by Mircher and Polignac on the mission to the Tuaregs was published in 1863. Based on the agreement with the Tuaregs the metropolitan French chambers of commerce gave support to the traders in Algiers to arrange a caravan to the Sudan, although it does not seem to have ever departed. After revolts in 1864 the projected trade between the Tuaregs and Algeria failed to develop. (Note: The Turks prohibited European visitors to Ghadames after 1878, and in 1899 it was decided that Ghadames was in Tripolitania, then a Turkish province and later part of the Italian colony of Libya. In 1910 the frontier between Tripolitania and Tunisia was defined as running 10 miles (16 km) to the west of the town.) However, the mission had gained detailed information on the trade between Tripoli and the Sudan. Mircher gave a detailed report on this trade from Tripoli via Ghadames to Timbuktu and the Hausa states.

== Later career ==
Polignac married Gabrielle Henriette Prinzessin von Croÿ (1835–1904) on 28 January 1874 at Dülmen, North Rhine-Westphalia, Germany. They had no children. The marriage was unhappy, and they separated when Polignac assumed the position of Chief of Military Affairs in Constantine.

After his retirement Polignac met the handsome, young and anti-semitic Marquis de Morès and came to believe that Morès could help create a French empire in north and central Africa that would compensate for the loss of Egypt to the British Jew, Benjamin Disraeli. He explained to Morès that the chivalric Tuaregs could easily be convinced that Islam and Catholicism were similar faiths, and once they had become loyal to the French all the other African Arabs would join in a crusade to drive the British out of the Mediterranean. Morès was convinced, and after studying the geography of Algeria for two years returned to France in mid-1895 in an unsuccessful attempt to raise funds.

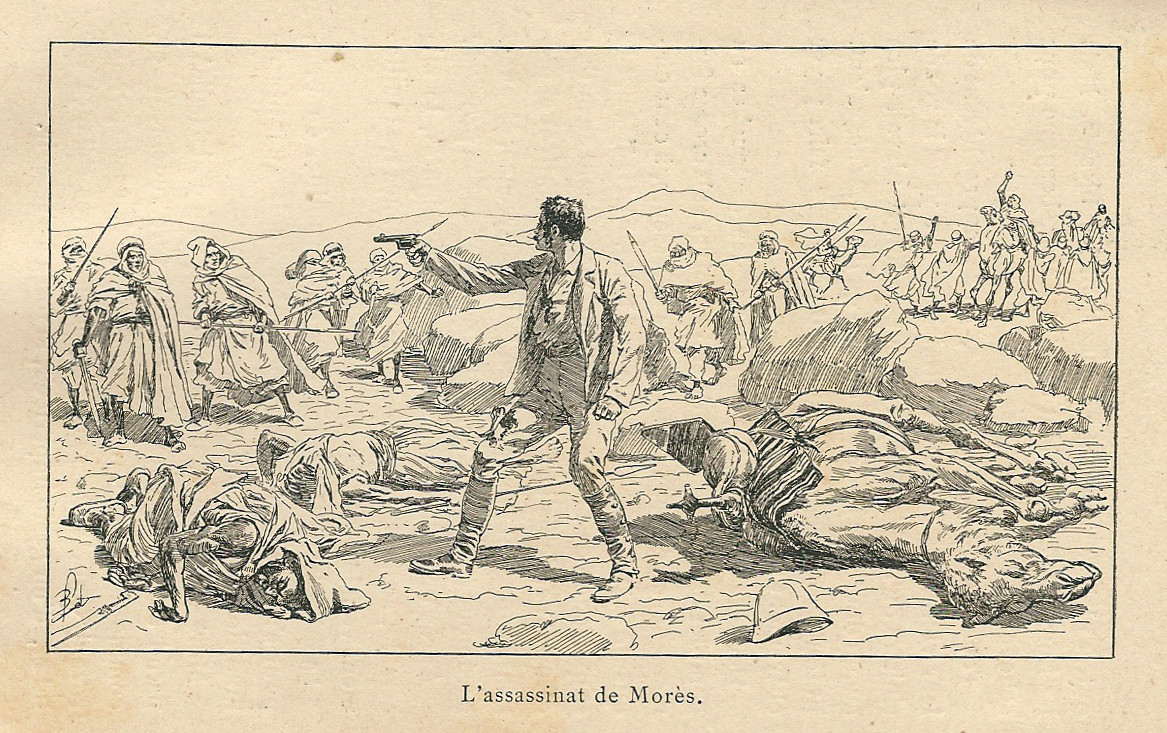
An impression of the death of Morès from a 1902 book

Morès returned to Algeria in March 1896. He made a speaking tour of Algerian towns with Polignac in which he denounced the Jews. He said, "France is exploited to the profit on foreigners, above all, England with the connivance of the Jews. Despite lack of money he decided to travel south the meet the Tuaregs, ignoring Polignac's warning that he should not go since he did not speak the language. Morès set out south from Ghadames with five companions, and on 9 June 1896 was ambushed and killed by a Tuareg force. Although Morès wanted the Tuareg to fight the Jews, his death was taken by the extreme right as evidence that the Tuareg were part of a huge conspiracy of Jews and Anglo-Saxons. The Dépêche algérien blamed the Polignacs and the Duveyriers for the tragedy and said the Tuaregs should be chased into their hideouts and made to pay for the bloodshed. Another Algerian newspaper said the Tuareg were like other "Semitic pirates, politicians and financiers" and should be outlawed.

In 1895 the Algerian Arab interpreter Djebari claimed that survivors from the Flatters expedition were still being held prisoner by the Tuaregs at the oasis of Taoua. A committee of African experts was formed to examine these claims. It included Colonel Ludovic de Polignac; Jean-Marie Bayol, former Lieutenant-Governor of Dahomey; the explorers Gaston Donnet, Bernard d'Attanoux and Ferdinand de Béhagle; and Paul Bourdarie, secretary-general of the Société africaine de France.

Ludovic de Polignac died on 13 January 1904 in Bouzaréah, a suburb of Algiers.

== Publications ==
Publications by Polignac include:

- Ludovic de Polignac (1862), Résultats obtenus jusqu'à ce jour par les explorations entreprises sous les auspices du Gouvernement de l'Algérie, pour pénétrer dans le Soudan, Paris: Challamel aîné, p. 19
- Polignac, Ludovic de; Mircher, Hippolyte (1863), Mission de Ghadamès (septembre, octobre, novembre & décembre 1862) (rapports officiels et documents à l'appui), Alger: impr. de Duclaux, publ. avec l'autorisation de son Excellence M. le maréchal duc de Malakoff, gouverneur général de l'Algérie, p. 358
- Ludovic de Polignac (1877), Considérations sur l'armée allemande (conférence faite à Alger), Paris: J. Dumaine, p. 48
- Ludovic de Polignac (1893), France et islamisme, Alger: imp. de L. Remordet, p. 52
- Ludovic de Polignac (1894), La France, vassale de l'Angleterre (Extrait du "Radical algérien", novembre-décembre 1893), Alger: impr. C. Zamith, p. 75
- Ludovic de Polignac (1895), Discours en faveur du canal des Deux-mers, Paris: Impr. de "la Vérité", p. 24
- Ludovic de Polignac (1896), Mes Souvenirs sur le Mis de Morès (Extrait de la "Revue générale internationale, scientifique, littéraire et artistique"), Paris: Imprimé pour l'auteur, p. 11

== Sources ==
- Brower, Benjamin Claude (2011), A Desert Named Peace: The Violence of France's Empire in the Algerian Sahara, 1844-1902, Columbia University Press, ISBN 978-0-231-15493-2
- Byrnes, Robert F. (July 1950), "Morès, "The First National Socialist"", The Review of Politics, 12 (3), Cambridge University Press for the University of Notre Dame du lac on behalf of Review of Politics: 341–362, doi:10.1017/S003467050004701X, JSTOR 1404665
- Cohen, William B. (December 1974), "Imperial Mirage: The Western Sudan in French Thought and Action", Journal of the Historical Society of Nigeria, 7 (3), Historical Society of Nigeria: 417–445, JSTOR 41857030
- Duveyrier, Henry (1874), "The Progress of Discovery South of Algeria, 1859-1872", in Sir Clements Robert Markham (ed.), Ocean highways: the geographical record (continued as The Geographical magazine), vol. 1
- Fuller, Robert Lynn (2012-04-19), The Origins of the French Nationalist Movement, 1886–1914, McFarland, ISBN 978-0-7864-9025-7
- "Gabrielle Henriette Prinzessin von Croÿ", genealogieonline
- Garric, Alain, "Charles Ludovic M DE POLIGNAC", geneanet (in French)
- Hippolyte Mircher (1820–1878) (in French), BnF: Bibliotheque nationale de France
- Houtsma, Th.; Wensinck, A.J.; Arnold, T.W., eds. (1987-12-31), E.J. Brill's First Encyclopaedia of Islam 1913-1936, BRILL, ISBN 90-04-08265-4
- Kahan, Sylvia (2009), In Search of New Scales: Prince Edmond de Polignac, Octatonic Explorer, University Rochester Press, ISBN 978-1-58046-305-8
- Kanya-Forstner, A. S. (1994), "French Missions to the Central Sudan in the 1890s: The Role of Algerian Agents and Interpreters", Paideuma: Mitteilungen zur Kulturkunde, 40, The Sokoto Caliphate and the European Powers 1890–1907, Frobenius Institute: 15–35, JSTOR 40341674
- Ludovic de Polignac (1828–1904) (in French), BnF: Bibliotheque nationale de France
- Ministère de la guerre (1855), Annuaire officiel des officiers de l'armée active
- Newbury, C. W. (1966), "North African and Western Sudan Trade in the Nineteenth Century: A Re-Evaluation", The Journal of African History, 7 (2), Cambridge University Press: 233–246, doi:10.1017/S0021853700006290, JSTOR 179952
- Shoup, John A. III (2011-10-17), Ethnic Groups of Africa and the Middle East: An Encyclopedia: An Encyclopedia, ABC-CLIO, ISBN 978-1-59884-363-7
