= Ferdinand de Béhagle =

French explorer

Jean Jacques Marie Ferdinand de Béhagle
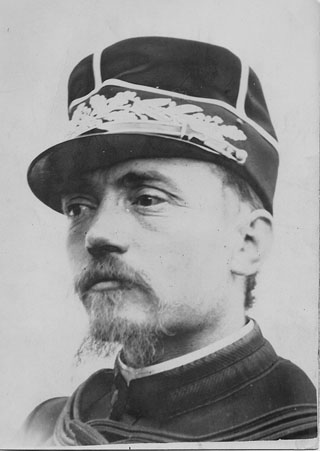
- Ferdinand de Béhagle c. 1895
- Born: 18 July 1857; Ruffec, Charente, France
- Died: 15 October 1899 (aged 42); Dikoa, Bornu Empire
- Occupation: Explorer

Jean Jacques Marie Ferdinand de Béhagle (18 July 1857 – 15 October 1899) was a French explorer of Africa. He served with the colonial service in Algeria and travelled in the Congo and Ubangi region. While attempting to find a viable land route from the Congo to the Mediterranean via Chad he was taken prisoner by Rabih az-Zubayr and hanged.

== Early years ==
Jean Jacques Marie Ferdinand de Béhagle was born in Ruffec, Charente on 18 July 1857. He became an officer of the merchant marine. He was then employed as administrator of mixed communes in Algeria. He served in Algeria from 1885 to 1891. On 15 September 1885 he married Rosine Dehoux in Bône, Algeria.

In 1892, de Béhagle was a volunteer member of the exploratory expedition organized by Casimir Maistre, François Joseph Clozel and Albert Bonnel de Mézières that followed the expedition of Paul Crampel. The mission ascended the Congo River, then the Ubangi River, and explored the divide between the Chad and Congo Basins. After his return, between 1893 and 1897, de Béhagle published a number of papers on the French colonization of Africa. He was an erudite man. De Béhagle and Paul Bourdarie (1864–1950) made speeches to the Société africaine de France in which they stressed the importance of the French colonists making a military "association" with the natives for defense of the colonies.

== Expedition to Bornu ==
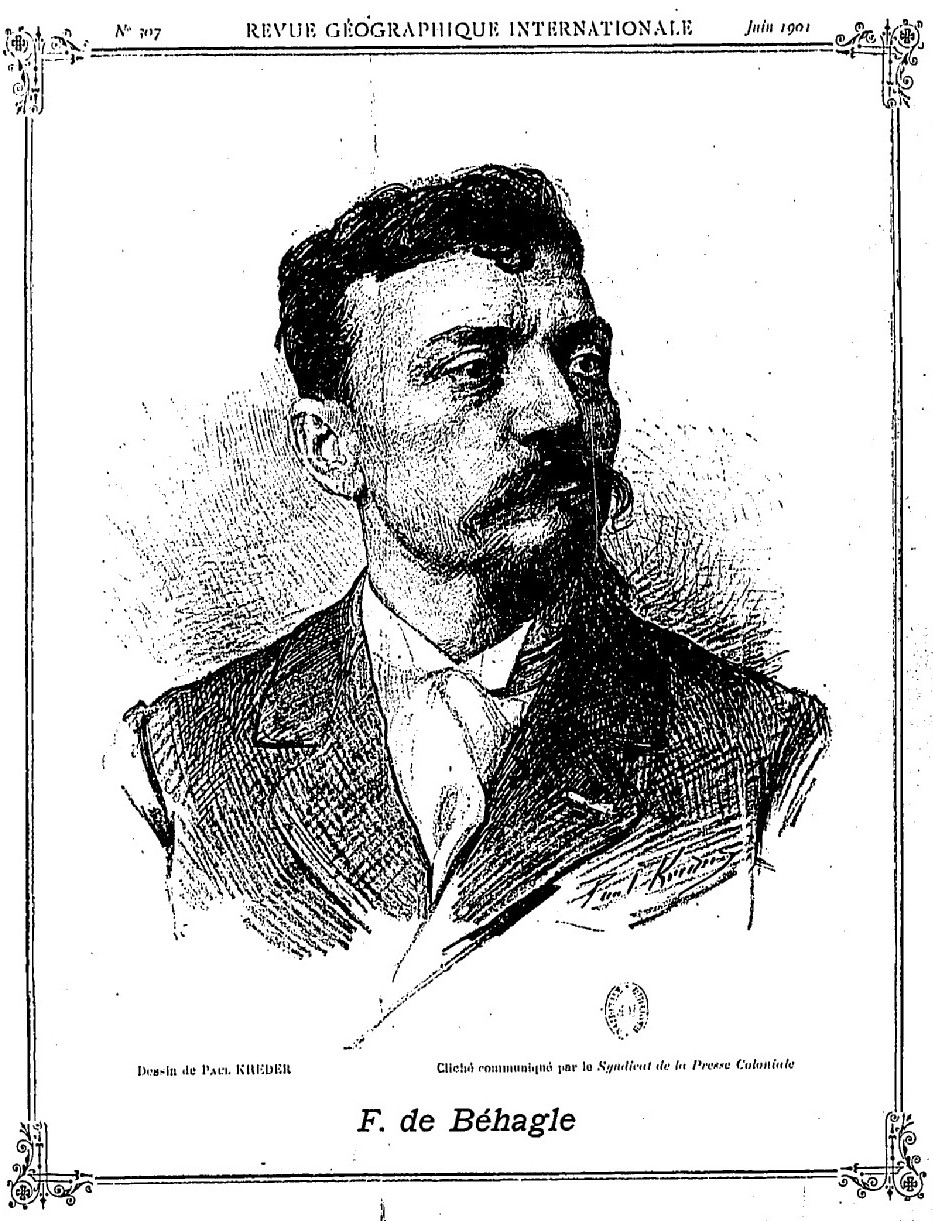
Plate from Béhagle's 1896 Voyage commercial et scientifique au bassin du Tchad, Afrique centrale

During the 1890s the Sudanese warlord Rabih az-Zubayr was actively expanding his power in the former Bornu Empire around Lake Chad. He built a fortress at Dikoa, to the south of Lake Chad, and attempted to obtain munitions to modernise his army from the British Royal Niger Company. The French officer Émile Gentil reached the Chari River from the Congo in 1897, and learned that Rabih az-Zubayr had been responsible for the death of Paul Crampel. Gentil signed a protectorate treaty with Gaorang, Sultan of Bagirmi to the southeast of Lake Chad. (Note: Gaorang, or Abd ar Rahman Gwaranga, was the 25th sultan of Baguirmi. In 1893, the forces of Rabih az-Zubayr burned the capital, Massenya, and in 1897, the French gave protectorate status to the sultanate at Gwaranga's request.)

Bonnel de Mézières engaged de Béhagle for his Paris-based Syndicat commercial français des bassin do Tchad et de l'Oubangui (SCFBTO). De Béhagle was asked to find an economically viable land route via Chad from the Congo to the Mediterranean Sea. In 1898, de Béhagle and Toussaint Mercuri (1871–1902) left Bangui, now in the Central African Republic, destined for Chad. De Béhagle explored the Tomi and Gribingui rivers, and found their sources. (Note: The Tomi and Gribingui rivers are both in the present Central African Republic. The inter-annual average discharge of the Tomi is 18.11 cubic metres (640 cu ft) per second, and that of the Gribinqui is 21.25 cubic metres (750 cu ft) per second.) He met Sultan Gaorang in Kouno in July 1898.

Rabih az-Zubayr now had an army of 10,000 men. He had imposed a dictatorship on the old Bornu empire, made the sultans his vassals and imposed a law based on the Sharia. De Béhagle was received by Rabih at Dikoa on 14 March 1899. At first, he was treated well, but the two men soon quarrelled. Rabih wanted to buy de Béhagle's rifles, and when he refused, threw him in prison.

== Death and legacy ==
In 1898, Émile Gentil had been given command of a new French mission to oppose Rabih in Bagirmi. Henri Bretonnet was sent ahead with an advance party to rescue de Béhagle, and was met by Rabih on the Chari. The battle of Togbao took place on 17 July 1899 on the banks of the Chari about 100 kilometres (62 mi) north of Fort Archambault (Sarh). Bretonnet and most of his men were killed. Rabih ordered the execution of de Béhagle on 15 October 1899. (Note: Another source says only that de Béhagle was hung at some time between August and October 1899 by Rabah's son Fadlallah, on his father's orders.) De Béhagle was hung and his body was thrown in a pit. The incident made war between France and Rabih inevitable.

De Béhagle's body was recovered in 1901 by troops of colonel Georges Destenave, and buried at Fort Lamy (N'Djamena). The rue Ferdinand-de-Béhagle was opened in Paris in 1932 in the 12th arrondissement near the Museum of African and Oceanic Arts, and was named after the explorer on 3 February 1936.

== Publications ==
Publications by Ferdinand de Béhagle included:

- Béhagle, Ferdinand de (1893), Observations astronomiques de la Mission Maistre en Oubangui-Chari et dans le sud du Tchad, relevés faits par Ferdinand de Béhagle, 1892-1893 (in French)
- Béhagle, Ferdinand de (1893), Projet de voyage commercial du Congo à la Méditerranée par le Tchad et ses affluents, soumis à la Société d'économie politique, industrielle et commerciale (in French), Paris: Lecène, Oudin et Cie, p. 16
- Béhagle, Ferdinand de (1894), "Niger, Bénoué et les droits de la France", Congrès de Caen (in French), Paris: Association française pour l'avancement des sciences: 15
- Béhagle, Ferdinand de (1894), "Le Bassin du Tchad, conférences faites dans les villes du groupe géographique du Sud-Ouest, les 13, 14 et 15 novembre 1893 ...", Bulletin de la Société de géographie commerciale de Bordeaux (in French), Bordeaux: G. Gounouilhou: 31
- Béhagle, Ferdinand de (April–May 1895), "Des moyens de combattre la dépopulation en Afrique", Bulletins et mémoires de la Société africaine de France (in French), Paris: J. André: 30
- Béhagle, Ferdinand de (1895), "Note sur un projet de voyage commercial du Congo à la Méditerranée", Bulletins et mémoires de la Société africaine (in French), Paris: J. André: 17
- Béhagle, Ferdinand de (1896), Voyage commercial et scientifique au bassin du Tchad, Afrique centrale (in French), Arcis-sur-Aube: L. Frémont, p. 32
- Béhagle, Ferdinand de (1897), Âme d'esclave (étude de moeurs sahariennes) (in French), Paris: bureaux de la "Revue de l'Islam", p. 86

== Sources ==
- Acte de Mariage (in French), 15 September 1885
- Betts, Raymond F. (1960), Assimilation and Association in French Colonial Theory, 1890-1914, U of Nebraska Press, ISBN 0-8032-6247-7
- Bradshaw, Richard; Fandos-Rius, Juan (2016-05-27), Historical Dictionary of the Central African Republic, Rowman & Littlefield Publishers, ISBN 978-0-8108-7992-8
- Coquery-Vidrovitch, Catherine; Baker, Mary (2009), Africa and the Africans in the Nineteenth Century, M.E. Sharpe, ISBN 978-0-7656-2834-3
- Ferdinand de Béhagle (1857-1899) - Auteur du texte (in French), BnF
- Roche, Christian (2011), Afrique noire et la France au dix-neuvième siècle, KARTHALA Editions, ISBN 978-2-8111-0493-1
- "rue Ferdinand-de-Béhagle", Les rues de Paris (in French)
- Runge, Juergen (2013-11-15), New Studies on Former and Recent Landscape Changes in Africa: Palaeoecology of Africa 32, CRC Press, ISBN 978-1-315-81505-3
- Syed, Muzaffar Husain; Akhtar, Syed Saud; Usmani, B D (2011-09-14), Concise History of Islam, Vij Books India Pvt Ltd, ISBN 978-93-82573-47-0
