= Hippolyte Mircher =

French soldier, Arabist and topographer

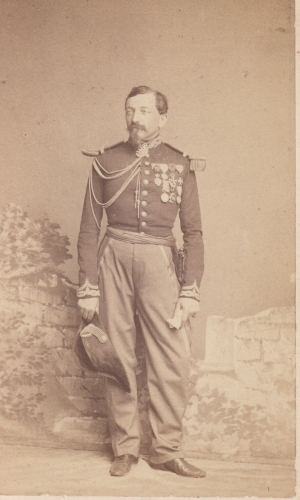
- Mircher by Photo Crémière, Paris
- Born: Hippolyte Etienne Alphonse Mircher; 13 August 1820; Strasbourg, France
- Died: 15 December 1878 (aged 58)
- Occupations: Soldier, topographer

Hippolyte Mircher (13 August 1820 – 15 December 1878) was a French soldier, Arabist and topographer who served for many years in Algeria and then Egypt during the construction of the Suez Canal. He is known for a mission to the Tuaregs he undertook in 1862.

== Life ==
Hippolyte Etienne Alphonse Mircher was born on 13 August 1820 in Strasbourg, Alsace. His parents were Guillaume Mircher (1785–1853) and Catherine Victoire Devaux (1791–1852). His father had been a junior officer in the Napoleonic armies and had little money. Hippolyte Mircher volunteered for the army at the age of 18 and was made a sergeant. He passed the competition at the École spéciale militaire de Saint-Cyr. He attended the staff college and graduated in 1842 first in his class out of 241 students. He was named Lieutenant in 1845 and Captain in 1847. He was posted to Algeria in 1852 and assigned to the governor general. He worked in the topographic office and studied the Arabic civilization and language. He had a daughter, Marie Noëlie, born in 1854 to Marguerite Victorine Gady (1828–1868). They married in Cairo on 3 January 1858.

During the Crimean War (1853–56) Mircher spent a few months with the Army of the East in the political and topographical service, starting in April 1854. He helped prepare for the march of the armies from Gallipoli to Adrianople and Varna, then to the Crimea. Mircher distinguished himself at the Battle of Alma (20 September 1854). He was made a Knight of the Legion of Honor after the Battle of Inkerman (5 November 1854). (Note: Mircher was made a knight of the Legion of Honour on 28 December 1854, and promoted to Officer of the Legion of Honour on 24 November 1859. He was made a Commander of the Legion of Honour on 15 November 1869.) He served in Kinburn when that city was occupied by the French. After the Crimean War Mircher was employed in Transcaucasia and Armenia to work on mapping the border between the Russian and Turkish empires. He was awarded the Turkish Order of the Medjidie. He returned to Paris, where he wrote a report on Anatolia.

Mircher returned to Algeria and served in the topographical brigade and in an expedition as aide-de-camp of General Édouard-Jean-Étienne Deligny. He was then promoted to Chef d'Escadrons (Squadron Leader). He served on the staff of General Edmond-Charles de Martimprey^{(fr)} during the Italian campaign. He returned to Algeria and served in the campaign against the Beni Snassem. As a distinguished Arabist he was charged with a mission to the Bey of Tunis. In 1862 he was assigned to arrange a commercial treaty with the Tuareg people. He undertook this mission between September and December 1862, travelling from Tripoli to Ghadames and then returning to Philippeville in Algeria. In 1863 Mircher was promoted to Lieutenant Colonel. His report on the mission to the Tuaregs, co-authored with his companion Ludovic de Polignac, was published in 1863.

Mircher was head of the military mission in Egypt from 7 May 1864 to 17 August 1870 during construction of the Suez Canal. He led a team of advisers to Isma'il Pasha, who was to pay their salaries but was to consult with the consul-general Maxime Outrey on their assignments. This led to repeated difficulties between Ismail and the French authorities. In 1866 Mircher was promoted to Colonel. On 20 January 1870 in Nancy, Lorraine, he married Marguerite de Mercy (1840–1894). They had three children.

Mircher was chief of staff of an infantry division in the 12th army corps during the Franco-Prussian War and fought in the Battle of Sedan (1–2 September 1870). He was taken prisoner at Sedan and held captive in Dresden. The letters that he wrote to his daughter Marie Noëlie from Dresden between September 1870 and March 1871 have been preserved. After being released, he served as first aide-de-camp and chief of staff to the governor general of Algeria from 2 April 1871 to 4 July 1873. He gave advice to the future explorer of French Africa Paul Soleillet, who was introduced to him by Auguste Warnier, the Deputy for Algeria. In 1873 he was named Chief of Staff of the 12th army corps. He retired as a Brigadier General in command of an infantry brigade in 1875. He died on 15 December 1878.

== Publications ==
- Polignac, Ludovic de; Mircher, Hippolyte (1863), Mission de Ghadamès (septembre, octobre, novembre & décembre 1862) (rapports officiels et documents à l'appui), Alger: impr. de Duclaux, publ. avec l'autorisation de son Excellence M. le maréchal duc de Malakoff, gouverneur général de l'Algérie, p. 358

== Sources ==
- Furia, Daniel (2008-07-01), Le général Mircher (1820–1878): Témoignages sur ses missions en Orient, au Sahara, en Egypte -la captivité en 1870-71- les débuts de la IIIe République (in French), Editions L'Harmattan, ISBN 978-2-296-20133-0
- Goublaye de Ménorval, Yves de la, "Hippolyte Etienne Alphonse Mircher", geneanet (in French)
- Goublaye de Ménorval, Yves de la (2004), Viajes a través de mi árbol genealógico: Reminiscencias del alma al viajar por el siglo XX y comienzos del XXI (1946–2003) (in Spanish), Plural editores, ISBN 978-99905-75-55-2
- Hippolyte Mircher (1820–1878) (in French), BnF: Bibliotheque nationale de France
- "Hippolyte Mircher", military-photos.com (in French)
- Napoleon III (1860), Bulletin des lois de l'Empire Français (in French), la République
- Napoleon III (1870), Bulletin des lois de la Empire Française (in French), Impr. Nat. des Lois
- O'Donnell, J. Dean (1990), "Théodore Roustan in Egypt, 1865-1874: Formation of a French Colonialist", Proceedings of the Meeting of the French Colonial Historical Society, 13/14, Michigan State University Press: 162–176, JSTOR 42952201
- Valette, Jacques (Fall–Winter 1980), "Pénétration française au Sahara et exploration : le cas de Paul Soleillet", Revue française d'histoire d'outre-mer (in French), 67 (248–249): 253–267, doi:10.3406/outre.1980.2261
