= Massenya Airport =

- IATA: none; ICAO: none

Summary
- Airport type: Public
- Serves: Massenya
- Location: Chad
- Elevation AMSL: 994 ft / 303 m
- Coordinates: 11°24′48.1″N 016°9′47.9″E

Map
- Location of Massenya Airport in Chad

Runways
Direction	Length		Surface
Direction	ft	m	Surface
11/29	3,160	963	Grass
- Source: Landings.com

Massenya Airport (Arabic: مطار ماسينيا) is a public use airport located near Massenya, Chari-Baguirmi, Chad.

== See also ==
- List of airports in Chad
