= Montfaucon, Lot =

Montfaucon
- Commune
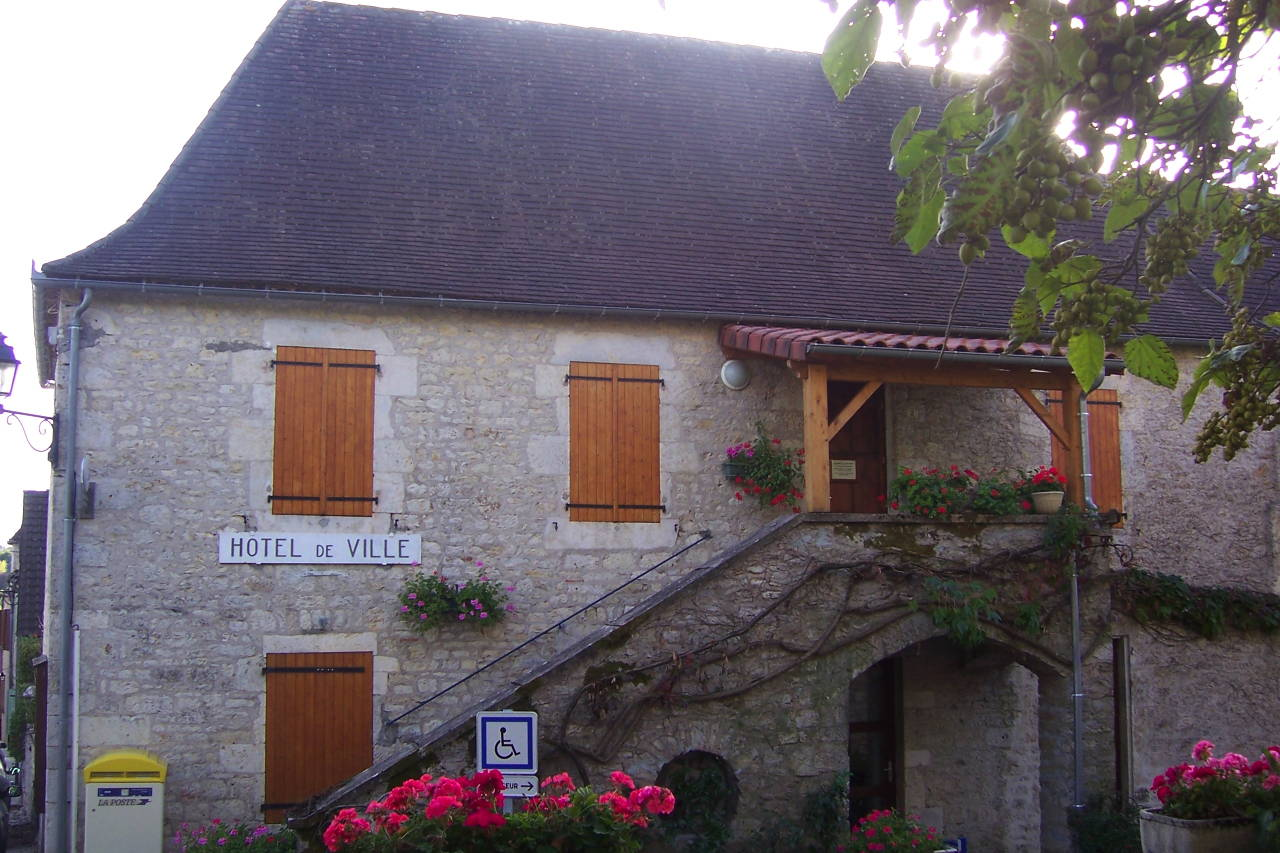
- The town hall in Montfaucon

- Coat of arms
- Location of Montfaucon
- Location within France Location within Occitanie
- Coordinates: 44°41′20″N 1°33′44″E
- Country: France
- Region: Occitania
- Department: Lot
- Arrondissement: Gourdon
- Canton: Causse et Bouriane
- Intercommunality: Causse de Labastide-Murat

Government
  - Mayor (2020–2026): Lionel Vacossin
- Area^{1}: 26.18 km^{2} (10.11 sq mi)
- Elevation: 303 m (994 ft)
- Highest elevation: 423 m (1,388 ft)
- Lowest elevation: 260 m (850 ft)
- Population (2023): 584
  - Density: 22.3/km^{2} (57.8/sq mi)
- Time zone: UTC+01:00 (CET)
  - Summer (DST): UTC+02:00 (CEST)
- INSEE/Postal code: 46204 /46240
- ^{1} French Land Register data, which excludes lakes, ponds, glaciers > 1 km^{2} (0.386 sq mi or 247 acres) and river estuaries.

Montfaucon (French pronunciation: [mɔ̃fokɔ̃]; Occitan: Montfalcon) is a commune in the Lot department in south-western France.

== Geography ==
The river Céou forms part of the commune's northern border.

== See also ==
- Communes of the Lot department
