= Massenya =

Regional capital of Chari-Baguirmi, Chad

Massenya ماسينيا
- Location in Chad
- Coordinates: 11°24′N 16°10′E
- Country: Chad
- Region: Chari-Baguirmi Region
- Department: Baguirmi
- Sub-Prefecture: Massenya
- Time zone: UTC+01:00 (WAT)

Massenya (Arabic: ماسينيا) is a small town located in the central-western part of Chad. It is the capital of the Chari-Baguirmi province and of the department of Baguirmi. Founded in the first half of the 16th century, Massenya was also the historical capital of the Kingdom of Baguirmi and the seat of the Mbang, or Sultan. (Note: Currently, the Kingdom of Bagirmi exists as an informal entity in the Baguirmi department, with its capital in Massenya, and its rulers continue to hold the title of "Mbang.")

It lies in the northwest of the Massenya Plain, an important wetland in the Sahel, which has been under the protection of the Ramsar Convention since 2008, and also located on the banks of the Chari River. The town is served by Massenya Airport.

The town is divided into three districts. The Bagirmi district hosts the main market and the residence of the Bagirmi mbang. The Haussa district was founded by the Arab religious leader Gombo Mahamat Oumar Abakar, a close friend of Mbang Gaourang from Nigeria, who became the imam of the great mosque until his death. The Sara district contains the administrative buildings. The population is made up of various communities, including Sara, Fula, Bagirmi, Arab, Wadaï, Hadjarai, Bulala, Hausa, and Kanuri people.

== History ==
The formation of the Kingdom of Bagirmi (c. 1522-1608) roughly coincides with the reigns of the first four monarchs. According to tradition, Dala Birni, the first sovereign, led a group of followers from the Kenga region around 1522. This group is said to have settled under a tamarind tree (mas in tar barma), where a young Fulani wet nurse named Enya was found. It is believed that, in honor of the tree and the woman, the settlement formed around the site was called Massenya, which became the kingdom's capital.

The economy of Massenya flourished in the 17th century, especially due to the intensification of the slave trade in the region. The town housed the Sultan's palace and a court of justice and was protected by a seven-mile-long wall. Except for the government buildings and a stone mosque, the majority of the town consisted of simple mud huts. In the 1850s, the population of the town was estimated to be around 25,000 inhabitants.

However, the military and commercial hegemony of Bagirmi faced several challenges. Between 1650 and 1675, the Kingdom of Bornu claimed sovereignty over Bagirmi, but this did not prevent the rulers of Bagirmi from sending invaders to Bornu. More significantly, the sultan of Wadai, Sabun, claimed suzerainty over Bagirmi, and taking advantage of the decline of Bagirmi's power at the end of the 18th century, launched an offensive in 1805. He captured Massenya, massacred the mbang and his family, and subdued the local population, enslaving many.

Sabun's invasion marked the beginning of a century of decline for the Kingdom of Bagirmi, which was repeatedly raided by the armies of Wadai. Massenya suffered heavy destruction, being partially devastated by the Wadai forces during a siege in 1870. However, the final destruction of the town occurred in 1894, when the army of Rabih az-Zubayr conquered Bagirmi, and burnt down Massenya, marking the end of the kingdom.
