= Académie des sciences d'outre-mer =

French learned society

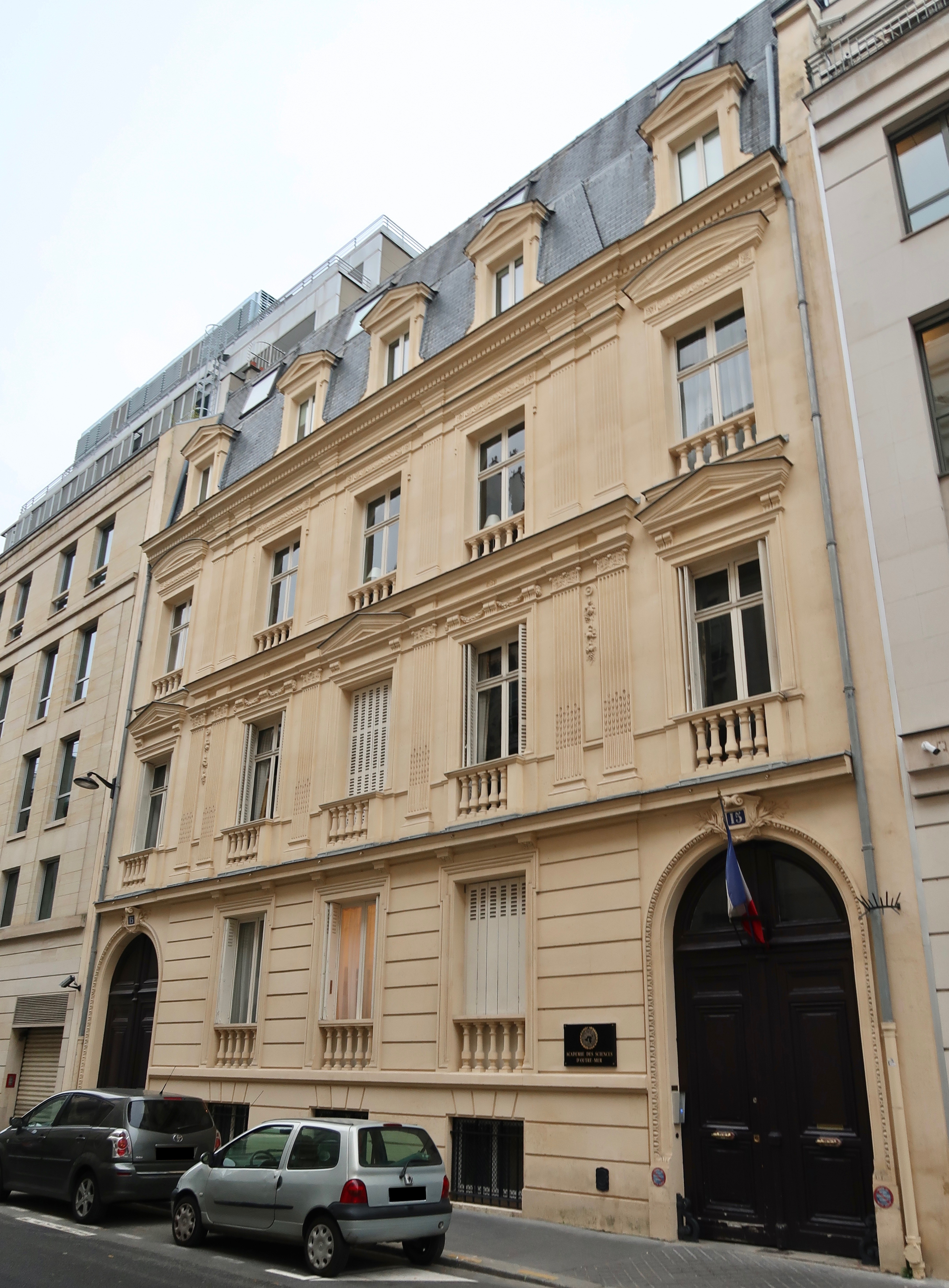
Académie des sciences d'outre-mer

Académie des sciences d'outre-mer (formerly Académie des sciences coloniales) is a learned society created in 1922 whose field of activity is mainly geography and general history in Africa, Latin America, Asia and Oceania. Its headquarters are located in the 16th arrondissement of Paris, at no. 15 rue La Pérouse.

Académie des sciences d'outre-mer (The Academy of Overseas Sciences) was founded in 1922 to study questions specific to the colonies, under the name of Académie des sciences coloniales (Academy of Colonial Sciences). The opening session took place at the Sorbonne on May 18, 1923, under the presidency of Albert Sarraut, Minister of Colonies, and in the presence of its founding president, Albert Lebrun, a former minister, and its first perpetual secretary, Paul Bourdarie, who launched the four verbs "to know, to understand, to respect, to love" that would become the academy's motto. On June 7, 1957, the academy was renamed the Académie des sciences d'outre-mer.

The academy has a library containing more than 70,000 works, making it a reference for documentation on the former colonies and overseas territories. In 2014, it incorporated the Africa and Overseas holdings of the former Documentation française, i.e. nearly 60,000 additional books and 1,600 periodicals.
