= List of rulers of Bagirmi =

The kings (mbangs) or sultans of Bagirmi ruled the sultanate of Bagirmi in central Africa (mostly within present-day Chad).

They include:

Tenure	Incumbent	Notes
c. 1480	Foundation of Baguirmi state
Mbangi (or Sultans)
Kenga Dynasty
1522 to 1536	Birni Besse, Mbangi
1536 to 1548	Lubatko, Mbangi
1548 to 1568	Malo, Mbangi
1568 to 1608	‘Abdallah, Mbangi
1608 to 1625	‘Umar
1625 to 1635	Dalai, Mbangi
1635 to 1665	Burkomanda I, Mbangi
1665 to 1674	‘Abdul Rahman I, Mbangi
1674 to 1680	Dalo Birni, Mbangi
1680 to 1707	‘Abdul Qadir I, Mbangi
1707 to 1722	Bar, Mbangi
1722 to 1736	Wanja, Mbangi
1736 to 1741	Burkomanda II Tad Lele, Mbangi
1741 to 1751	Loel, Mbangi
1751 to 1785	Hajji Mohammed al'Amin, Mbangi
1785 to 1806	‘Abd ar-Rahman Gawrang, Mbangi (‘Abdul Rahman II Gauranga)
1806 to 1806	Malam Ngarmaba Bira, Mbangi	1st Term
1806 to 1807	‘Uthman Burkomanda III al-Kabir, Mbangi	1st Term
1807 to 1807	Malam Ngarmaba Bira, Mbangi	2nd Term
1807 to 1807	‘Uthman Burkomanda III al-Kabir, Mbangi	2nd Term
1807 to 1807	Muhammad III, Mbangi
1807 to 1846	‘Uthman Burkomanda III al-Kabir, Mbangi	3rd Term
1846 to 1858	‘Abdul Qadir II al-Mahdi, Mbangi
1858 to 1870	Abu-Sekkin Mohammed IV, Mbangi (Mohammed IV Abu-Sekkin)	1st Term
1870 to 1871	‘Abd ar-Rahman II, Mbangi (Abdul Rahman III)
1871 to 1884	Abu-Sekkin Mohammed IV, Mbangi (Mohammed IV Abu-Sekkin)	2nd Term
1884 to 1885	Burkomanda IV as-Saghir, Mbangi
1885 to 1885	Ngarmane Ermanala, Regent
1885 to 1912	‘Abd ar-Rahman Gawrang II, Mbangi (‘Abdul Rahman III)
French Suzerainty
1912 to 1918	‘Abd ar-Rahman Gawrang II, Mbangi (‘Abdul Rahman III)
1918 to 1935	‘Abdul Qadir III, Mbangi (Muhammad Urada)
1935 to 1970	Youssouf, Mbangi
1960	State suppressed by Chad government
14 June 1970	State reconstituted by Chad government
14 June 1970 to 1980	Mohamed Youssouf Mahamat, Mbangi
1980 to 2003	Abderahmane Gaourang III, Youssouf Mahamat Youssouf, Mbangi
18 August 2003 to present	Hadji Woli Mahamat, Mbangi

== See also ==
- Chad
  - Heads of State of Chad
  - Heads of Government of Chad
  - Colonial Heads of Chad
- Lists of Incumbents
