= Dekoa =

Dekoa Dékoua
- Sub-prefecture and town
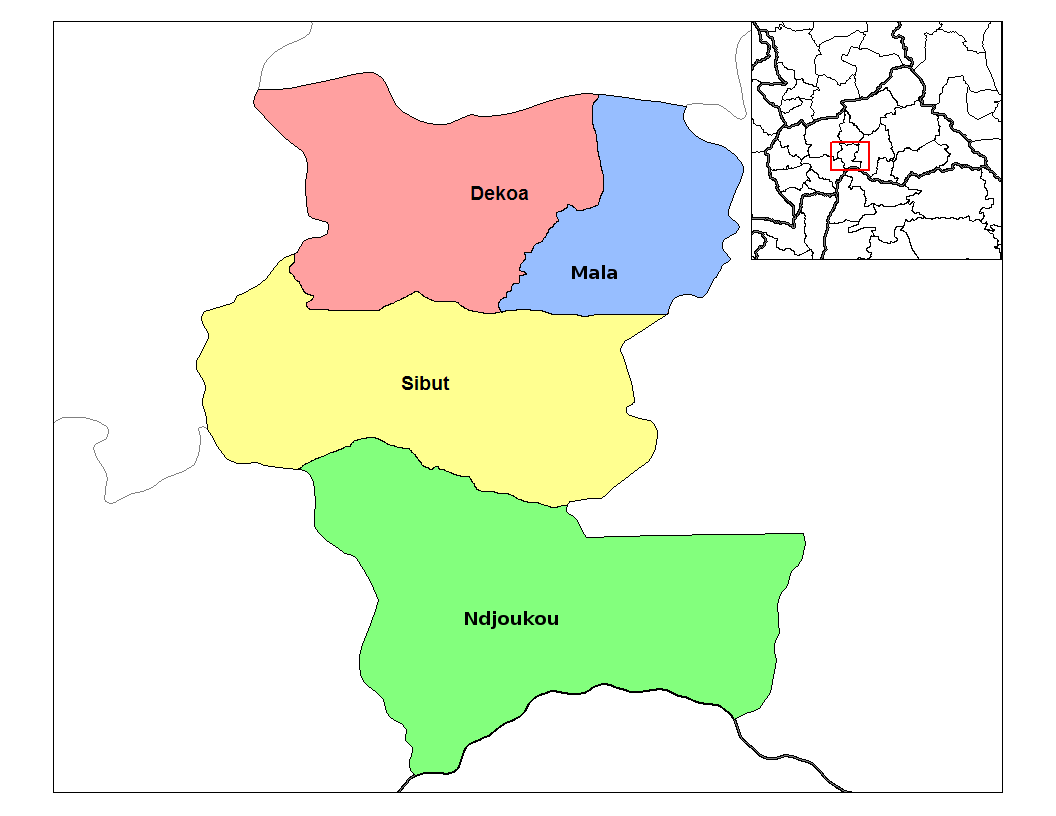
- Sub-prefectures of Kémo

- Location in the Central African Republic
- Coordinates: 6°19′N 19°4′E
- Country: Central African Republic
- Prefecture: Kémo

Government
  - Sub-Prefect: Basile Cyriac Leppa
- Time zone: UTC+1 (WAT)

Dekoa (Dékoua) is a sub-prefecture and town in the Kémo Prefecture of the south-eastern Central African Republic.

== History ==
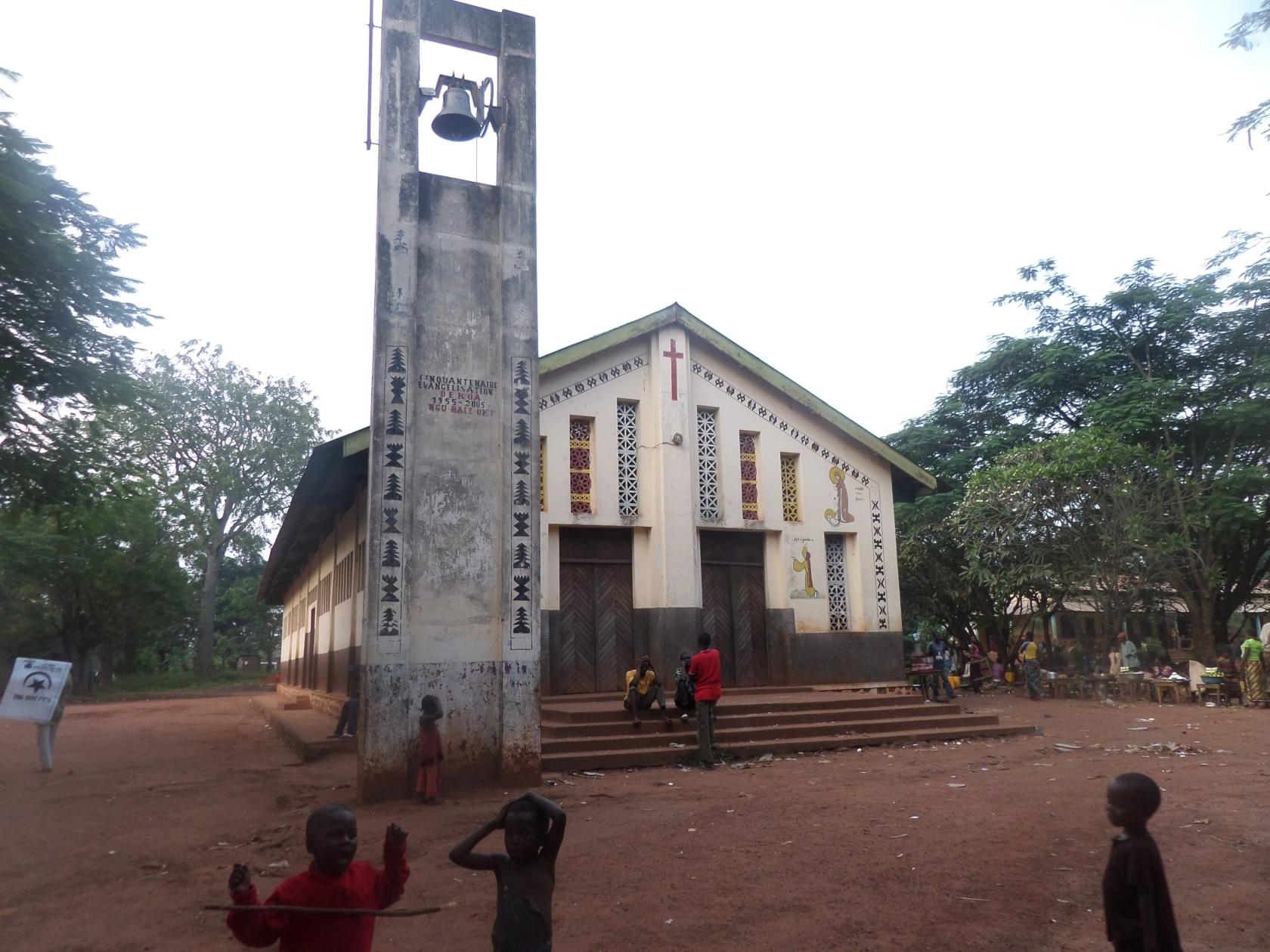
The Catholic church at Dekoa.

In the nineteenth century freebooter Rabih az-Zubayr brought Dekoa under his sway and made it a part of the Bornu Empire. In March 1899, the sultan captured and imprisoned the explorer Ferdinand de Béhagle at Dekoa. Béhagle was subsequently hanged after the French battled the sultan's troops at Kouno in October of that year.

=== Civil war ===
On 28 December 2012 Séléka rebels took control of Dekoa. On 8 April 2014 Anti-balaka attacked ex-Seleka positions in Dekoa resulting in 30 deaths. On 17 August 2018 FACA was deployed in Dekoa. Three UN peacekeepers from Burundi were killed in Dekoa and Bakouma on December 26, 2020, one day before the 2020 Central African general election. Three Anti-balaka leaders in Kaga-Bandoro were arrested by international forces for ordering the attack.
