= Georges Destenave =

French explorer and general

Georges Destenave (17 May 1854 – 23 December 1928) was a French general and colonial administrator. After serving in Algeria and in the French Sudan, he was appointed as the Military Governor of France's Chad Territory in 1900. It was written that Destenave's rule "was so repressive and flogging with the chicotte (whip) so frequent that reference to the "Code Destenave" became common.
