= Sultanate of Bagirmi =

Former Islamic state in central Africa

- Bagirmi (pink) in the Lake Chad region around 1890
- Status: State from 1522–1897; Currently a non-sovereign monarchy within Chad
- Capital: Massenya (1522–1893); Chekna (1893–1897)
- Common languages: Bagirmi
- Religion: Islam, African Traditional Religion
- Mbang, later Sultan
  - 1522–1536: Abd al-Mahmud Begli/Birni Besse
  - 1885–1912: Gaourang II (Note: last sovereign monarch)
  - 2003–present: Hadji Wola Mahamat
- History
  - Established: 1522
  - Islam becomes state religion: 1568–1608
  - Conquered by Wadai: 1805
  - Conquered by Rabih az-Zubayr: 1893
  - French protectorate established: 1897
  - Tombalbaye abolishes the traditional kingdoms: 1960
  - Bagirmi is reinstated: 1970

Area
  - Total: 70.000 sq mi (181.30 km^{2})
- Currency: Cowrie shells
Succeeded by
French Chad

The Sultanate or Kingdom of Bagirmi (French: Royaume du Baguirmi) was an Islamic sultanate southeast of Lake Chad in Central Africa. Founded in 1522, it was a tributary to the Bornu Empire for much of its existence, and lasted until 1897. Its capital was Massenya, north of the Chari River and close to the border to modern Cameroon. The kings had the title Mbang. Bagirmi was first mentioned in a Bornu chronicle in 1578 as "Bakarmi".

Bagirmi regained full independence from Bornu in the 18th century. It was conquered by Wadai in 1805, and again by Sudanese warlord Rabih az-Zubayr in 1893. In 1897 at the request of the mbang it became a French protectorate, and, after the killing of az-Zubayr and disintegration of his state, a French colony in 1902. The Sultanate continues to exist as a non-sovereign monarchy in Chad.

== History ==
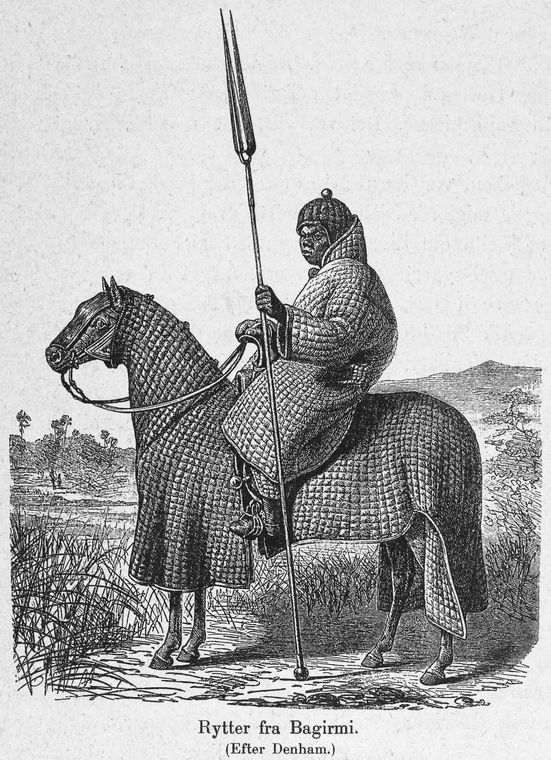
"Horseman from Bagirmi" by Dixon Denham, 1823.

=== Origin and apogee ===
According to Bagirmi traditions, the kingdom emerged from a group of chiefdoms around 1522. Some king lists hold Mbang Birni Besse as its founder (reigning from 1522), however others consider it to have been Abd al-Mahmud Begli (reigning from 1493 to 1503). Begli and his successor oversaw the construction of a palace and courthouse in Massenya, the capital and economic centre of the state. The mosque and palace were built of stone, while houses were built of clay. Throughout the 16th century, the mbangs consolidated their heartland and made various small states their tributaries. Alongside the Bagirmi, the state's population included Fula, Kanuri, and Shuwa Arabs.

Bagirmi's emergence was mirrored by the emergence of other minor states also on the Bornu Empire's southern border, such as Mandara, Kotoko, and Yamta. Bornu, under the reign of Idris Alooma (1571-1602/3), embarked on conquering its smaller southern neighbours, and succeeded in absorbing Bagirmi. Encouraged by the Sefuwa of Bornu, some Komboli traders from Bagirmi settled in the Zamfara Valley. Bagirmi was heavily dependent on Bornu in order for them to engage in the trans-Saharan trade. Bagirmi was a large provider of slaves for the trans-Saharan slave trade, procured to their south.

Under the reign of Mbang Abdullah (1568–1608), who was possibly supported to the throne by Bornu, the kingdom's court converted to Islam, however most of the population continued to follow traditional religions. Abdullah rebelled against Bornu, inducing Alooma to invade, resulting Alooma's death in 1602 or 1603, reportedly assassinated by a Gumergu. During the reign of Mbang Burkumanda (1635–1665) Bagirmi extended their influence north to Lake Chad and sent raiding parties into Bornu. Bagirmi expanded into the interior of the Chari River. It is unclear whether Bagirmi's expansion was primarily motivated by the procurement of slaves. The emergence of Wadai as a major power in the 17th century checked Bagirmi's expansionism. Under Mbang Muhammad al-Amin (reigning from 1751 to 1785) Bagirmi regained their independence from Bornu after threatening attacks on their eastern frontier.

=== Decline and colonisation ===
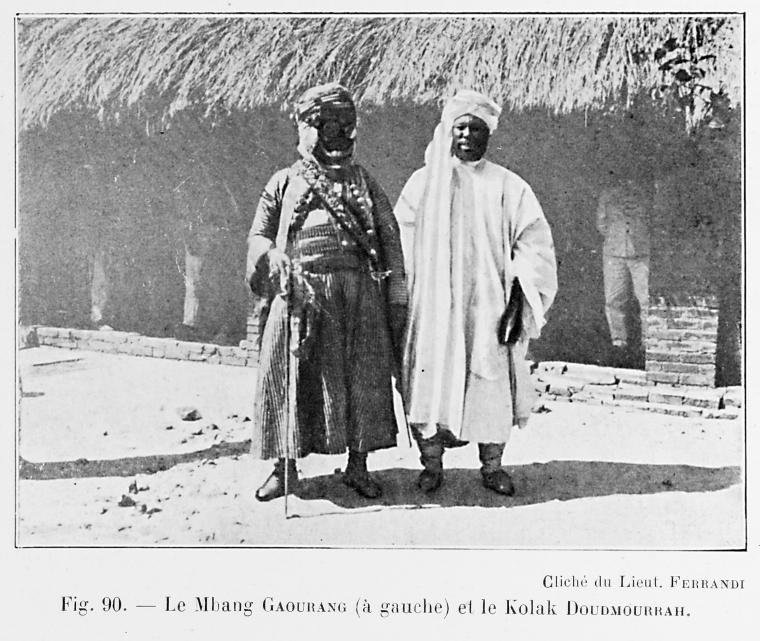
The Mbang Abd ar Rahman Gwaranga (left) with Wadai's Dud Murra (right)

Bagirmi declined during the late 18th century and by the turn of the 19th century had lost most of its tributaries. Wadai took advantage of this and invaded in 1805. They sacked Massenya, killed the mbang and their family, and 20,000 people were made prisoners and sold into slavery. Wadai placed the mbang's son (Burkomanda) on the throne, and Bagirmi subsequently became a tributary. Throughout the 19th century, various European travellers and explorers visited Bagirmi and wrote about it, such as Heinrich Barth who in 1852 stated in regard to a Fulani man who possessed knowledge of Plato and Aristotle:

I could scarcely have expected to find in this out-of-the-way place a man not only versed in all the branches of Arabic literature, but who had even read (nay, possessed a manuscript of ) those portions of Aristotle and Plato which had been translated into Arabic… He was as anxious to obtain information from me with regard to the countries of the Christians [Europe], and those parts of the world with which he was less acquainted, as I was to be instructed by him

Bagirmi was again invaded by Wadai in 1870 and Massenya partly destroyed. Internal conflicts weakened the state further. In 1893, warlord Rabih az-Zubayr conquered Baguirmi and burnt down its capital Massenya. Mbang Abd ar-Rahman Gaourang II appealed to the French for support, making Bagirmi a French protectorate after the signing of a treaty in 1897. In 1900 the combined forces of the French and Bagirmi killed az-Zubayr, causing the disintegration of his state. The Bagirmi Protectorate became a colony in 1902.

=== Post-independence ===
After Chad's independence in 1960, the Tombalbaye regime abolished the country's non-sovereign monarchies. The policy was reversed in 1970 on the recommendations of the French Mission de Reforme Administrative (MRA), however after the overthrow of Tombalbaye the mbang's powers were again curtailed. In March 2010, the Sultan of Baguirmi, Mbang Hadji Woli Mahamat (reigning since 2003) was reinstated in his functions by the Chadian Minister of the Interior and Public Security.

== Economy, society, and government ==
Bagirmi was a large provider of slaves for the trans-Saharan slave trade, procured to their south, One part of this trade involved the supply of eunuchs, and Bagirmi was a major centre for the castration of slaves during the 18th century. There were significant risks for the victim of this procedure; a German doctor who visited the area c. 1870 reported than less than one third of the boys who were castrated survived the operation. Eunuchs produced in Bagirmi were sold locally and to the adjoining kingdoms of Bornu and Wadai. Some were sold further afield, being used in Medina, Mecca and, in some instances, the Topkapı Palace in Istanbul.

Bagirmi also exported animal skins, ivory, and cotton. Imports were copper and cowrie shells, which were used as their currency. Slavery was fundamental to the economy, and chattel slaves were exported. Agricultural labourers worked on local estates, and retainers worked for the mbangs and their officials (the maladonoge). Bagirmi specialised in procuring eunuchs for the Ottomans. According to some sources, slavery was considered a phase of life after which people would return to their normal lives.

Bagirmi also received tribute from various smaller states and nomadic peoples in the form of slaves. Tributaries often adopted Bagirmi culture and sent elite youth to Massenya's court for education. Tributaries under direct rule were governed by ngars. Professional guilds had their own leaders with titles.

In 1850, Massenya had a population of 15,000.

== See also ==
- Rulers of Bagirmi
- History of Chad
- Bagirmi people
