= North Region (Cameroon) =

Region of Cameroon

North Region Région du Nord
- Region of Cameroon
- Location of North Region within Cameroon
- Coordinates: 8°30′N 14°00′E
- Country: Cameroon
- Capital: Garoua
- Departments: Bénoué, Faro, Mayo-Louti, Mayo-Rey

Government
  - Governor: Roger-Moïse Eyène Lom

Area
  - Total: 66,090 km^{2} (25,520 sq mi)

Population (2015)
  - Total: 2,442,578
  - Density: 36.96/km^{2} (95.72/sq mi)
- HDI (2022): 0.463 low · 10th of 10

The North Region (French: Région du Nord) makes up 66,090 km^{2} of the northern half of The Republic of Cameroon. Neighbouring territories include the Far North Region to the north, the Adamawa Region to the south, Nigeria to the west, Chad to the east, and Central African Republic to the southeast. The city of Garoua is both the political and industrial capital. Garoua is Cameroon's third largest port, despite the fact that the Bénoué River upon which it relies is only navigable for short periods of the year.

Major ethnic groups include the Fula or Fulani (Fula: Fulɓe; French: Peul), who are Islamic pastoralists, and numerous Muslim and animist speakers of Adamawa, Chadic, and Nilo-Saharan languages. French is the language of formal education, and Fulfulde, the language of the Fulbe, is widespread as a lingua franca.

== Geography ==
=== Land ===
Bands of alternating metamorphic and sedimentary rock interspersed with granite characterise the north's geology. Granite covered in volcanic basalt makes up the southernmost reaches, which form part of the Adamawa Plateau. A series of faults lies north of this and separate the plateau from the band of metamorphic stone to its north. Random granite deposits also characterise this area. The Mayo Rey and Vina River cut north of this portion, leaving deposits of sedimentary stone except in the granite east. North of this lies a band of sedimentary alluvium, clay, limestone, and sandstone. Faults tentatively follow the Bénoué River north of this and form a barrier to split the remainder of the province, with metamorphic rocks such as gneiss, mica, and schists dominating to the south and sedimentary stone making up the north. Another large band of metamorphic rock makes up the territory northwest of the Bénoué basin. The Mandara Mountains, which run roughly north–south at the province's Nigerian border, are irregular in that they are volcanic, composed mostly of crystalline and metamorphic rock and granite.

The Adamawa Plateau divides the province into two main soil types. Those to the north are mostly shallow and ferruginous, brown or brownish red in colour. On the plateau itself, they are mostly ferralitic or lateritic. The region's annual rainy/dry cycle erodes the landscape and aids in the formation of iron deposits called duricrust or hardpans near the surface. in addition, the area between the Vina and Mbere Rivers and the Mayo Deo valley is hydromorphic, while the volcanic Mandara and Atlantika Mountains, other high points in the province, and the Mayo Oulo valley are composed of relatively young soils high in raw mineral content. The bottom of the Bénoué basin is alluvial soil.

=== Drainage ===
All rivers in the province experience a tropical regime, with a period of high water during the rainy season during which flooding may occur. The Bénoué, Mayo Oulo, Mayo Kébi, and Mayo Godi are particularly susceptible to this (mayo is the Fulfulde word for river). In contrast, however, the rivers mostly dry up during the dry season, many disappearing completely into the sand. Animals and humans must dig during this period to retrieve water. This means that the port of Garoua on the Bénoué is only functional during a small portion of the year.

The Bénoué River (Benue) serves as the North's primary waterway, as it passes through the port at Garoua. It flows down from the Adamawa Plateau and is enlarged by the Mayo Rey, the Mayo Kebi (which flows into the area from Chad), the Mayo Louti (which flows down from the Mandara mountains) and other rivers. Its valley forms the main part of the Bénoué Depression. Several smaller tributaries also flow into the Bénoué. All of these waterways form part of the Niger basin.

The Lagdo Reservoir is formed by a dam at Lagdo that traps waters from the Benoue and its smaller tributaries the Mayo Godi, Mayo Rey, Mayo Sina, Mayo Oldiri, and others, many of which rise on the Adamawa Plateau. The reservoir provides an important source of hydroelectric power for Cameroon's three northern provinces. Local villagers also use it as a source of fish, and both the lake and the river are used for irrigation.

Another significant river is the Vina, which rises in the Adamawa Province, flows through the North, and then empties into the Logone River in Chad. It is swelled by the Mbéré River east of Touboro. Before this, the Mbéré forms the province's southeastern border with Chad for several kilometers. These are the only major rivers in the province that form part of the Chad Basin.

=== Relief ===
The Bénoué Depression constitutes the North Province's primary land feature. This basin runs along the Mayo Kébi and Bénoué River and has an elevation of between zero and 200 metres. The valleys surrounding the various rivers that feed the Kébi and later Bénoué reach elevations only slightly higher than this, averaging 200–500 metres in the north and 500–1000 metres in the south (the dividing line is at about 8˙ N). Garoua lies at about 235 metres. Farther north is the Kaélé Elevation. A major fault runs north of the Bénoué, roughly parallel to it.

South of the Bénoué Depression lies the Adamawa Plateau. This descends to the Depression in escarpments and peaks of between 1000 and 2000 metres that follow a major fault. Past this frontier region, the plateau slopes south and southeast into the Adamawa Province and Chad.

The North's third significant land feature is the Mandara Mountains and their southern extension, the Atlantika Mountains, the likely results of tectonic activity. These chains form most of the western edge of the province, with peaks as high as 1000 metres. The mountains continue north into the Far North Province and Nigeria, though their elevations gradually drop to as low as 500 metres. The surrounding terrain is hilly. The North's highest elevation is Hosséré Vokré (Vokne), an isolated peak of 2,049 metres.

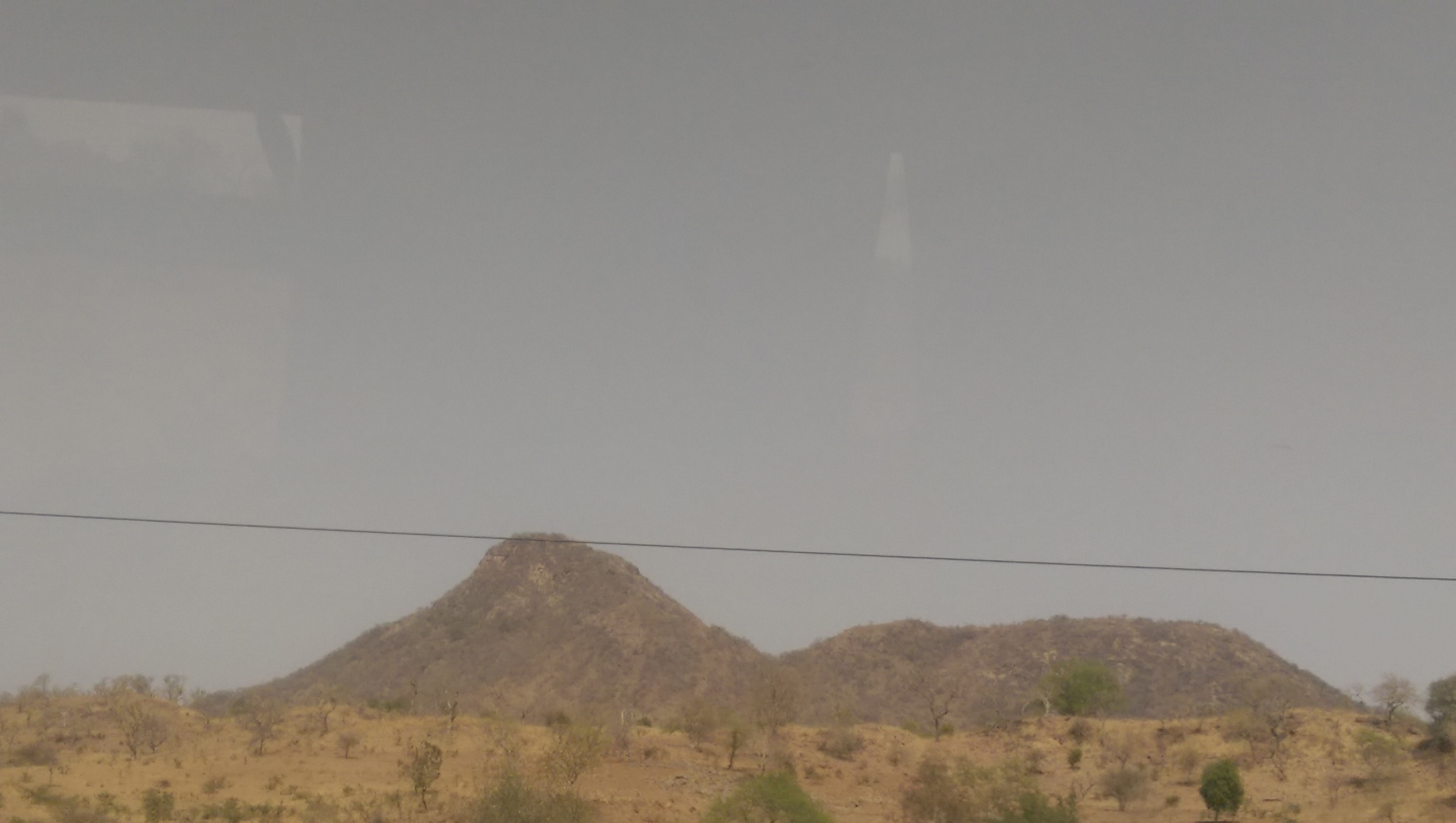
Mountain in the North

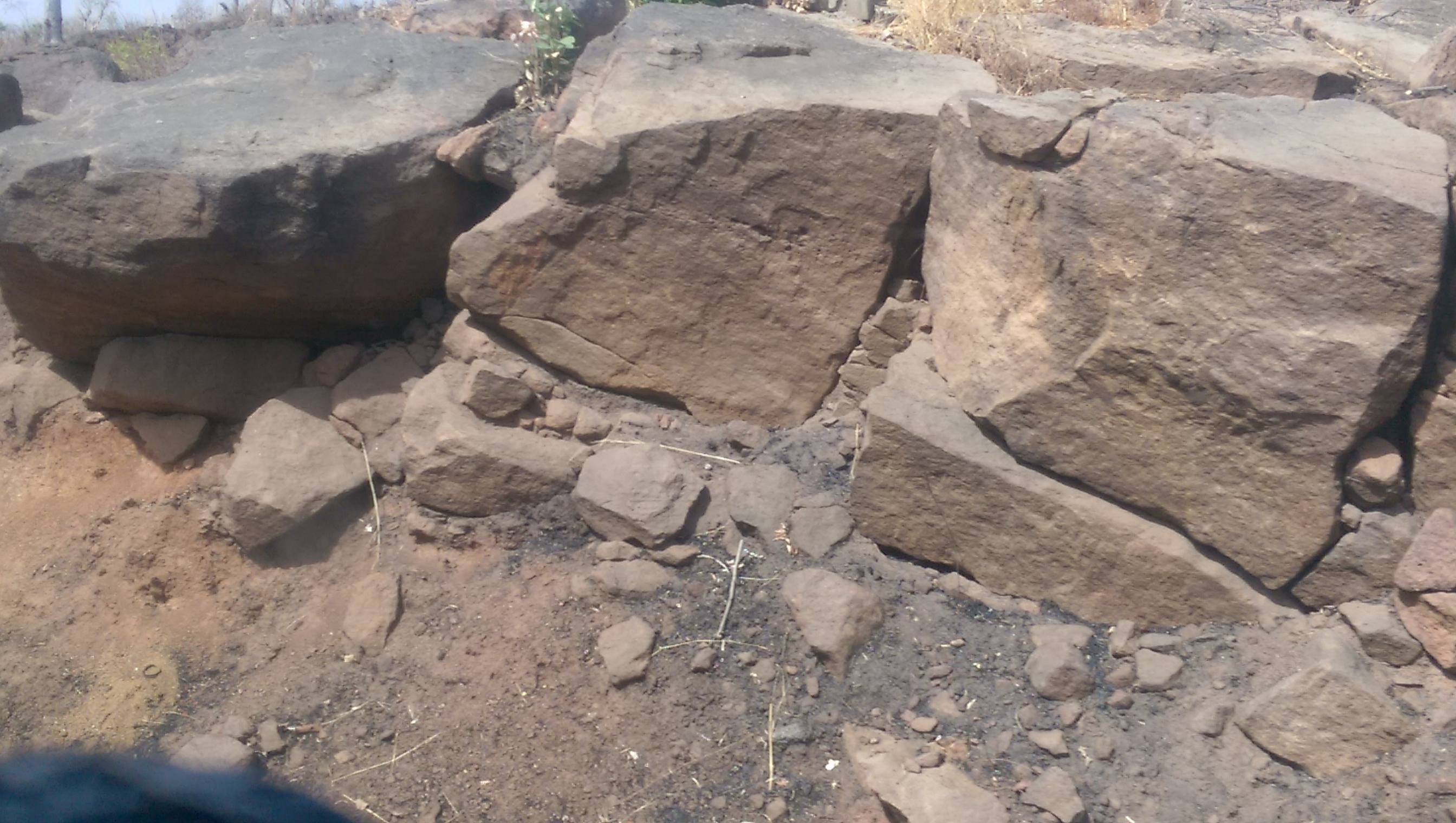
Eroded rock structures

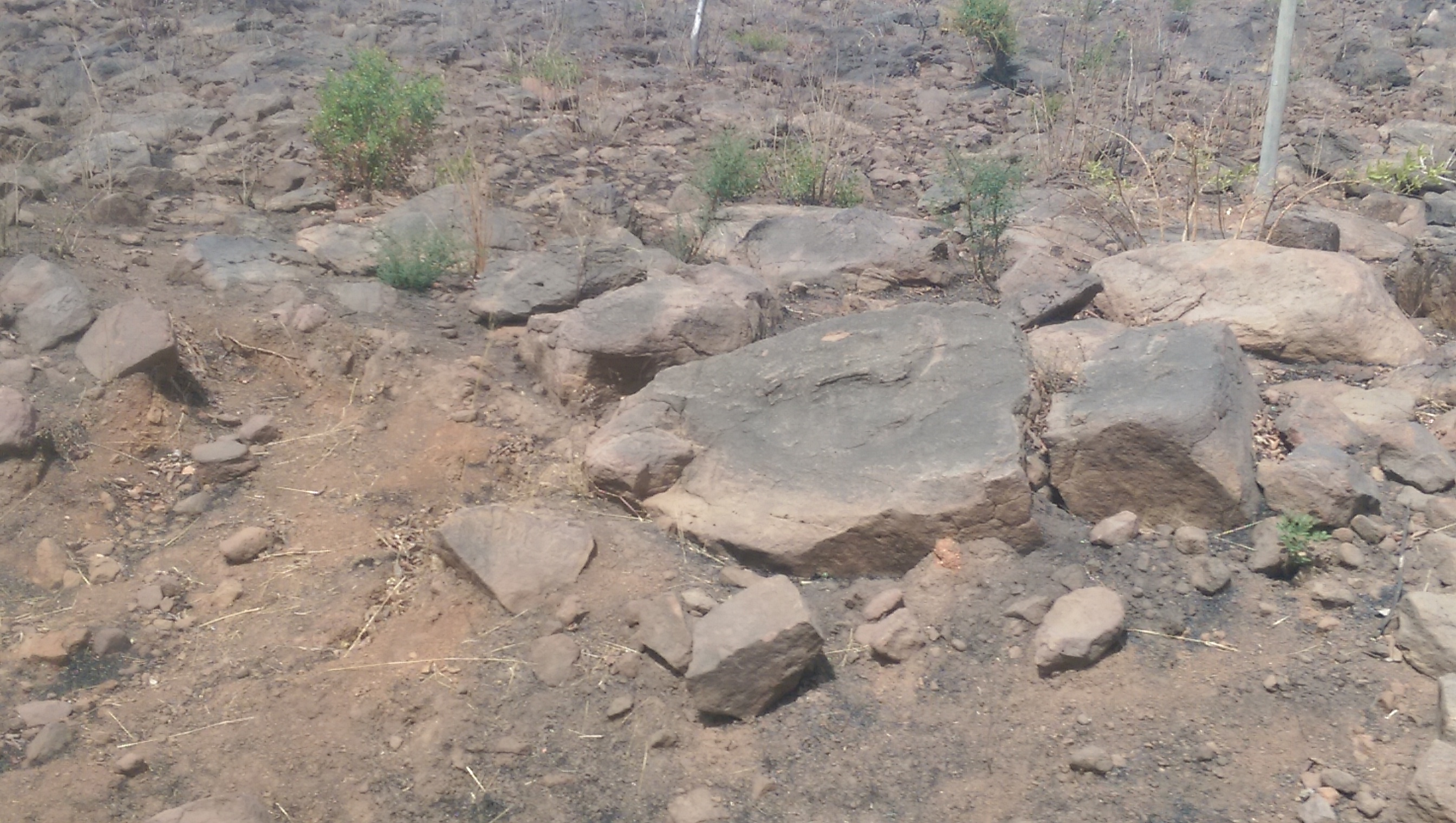
Rocky terrain

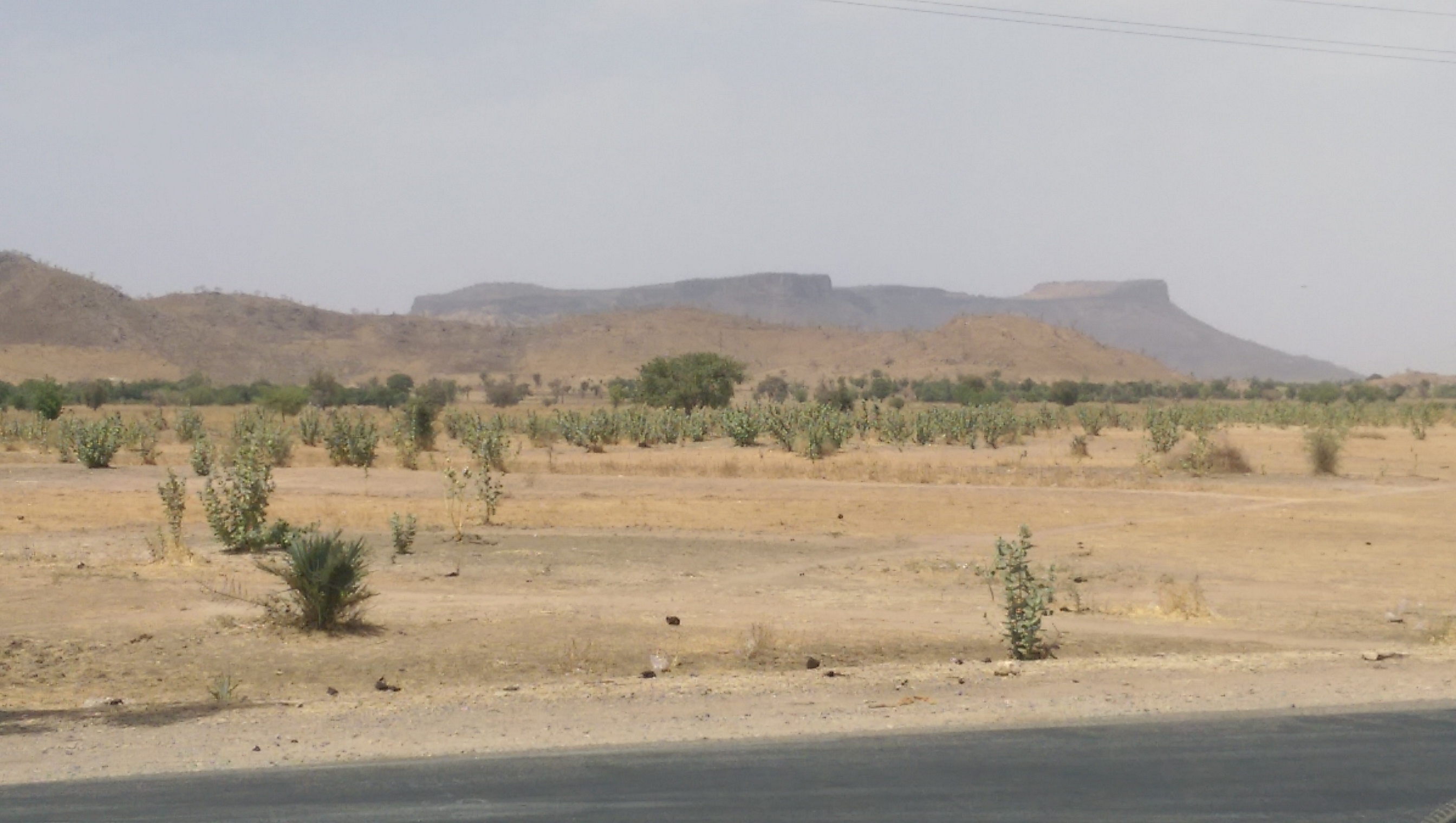
Mountains in the North

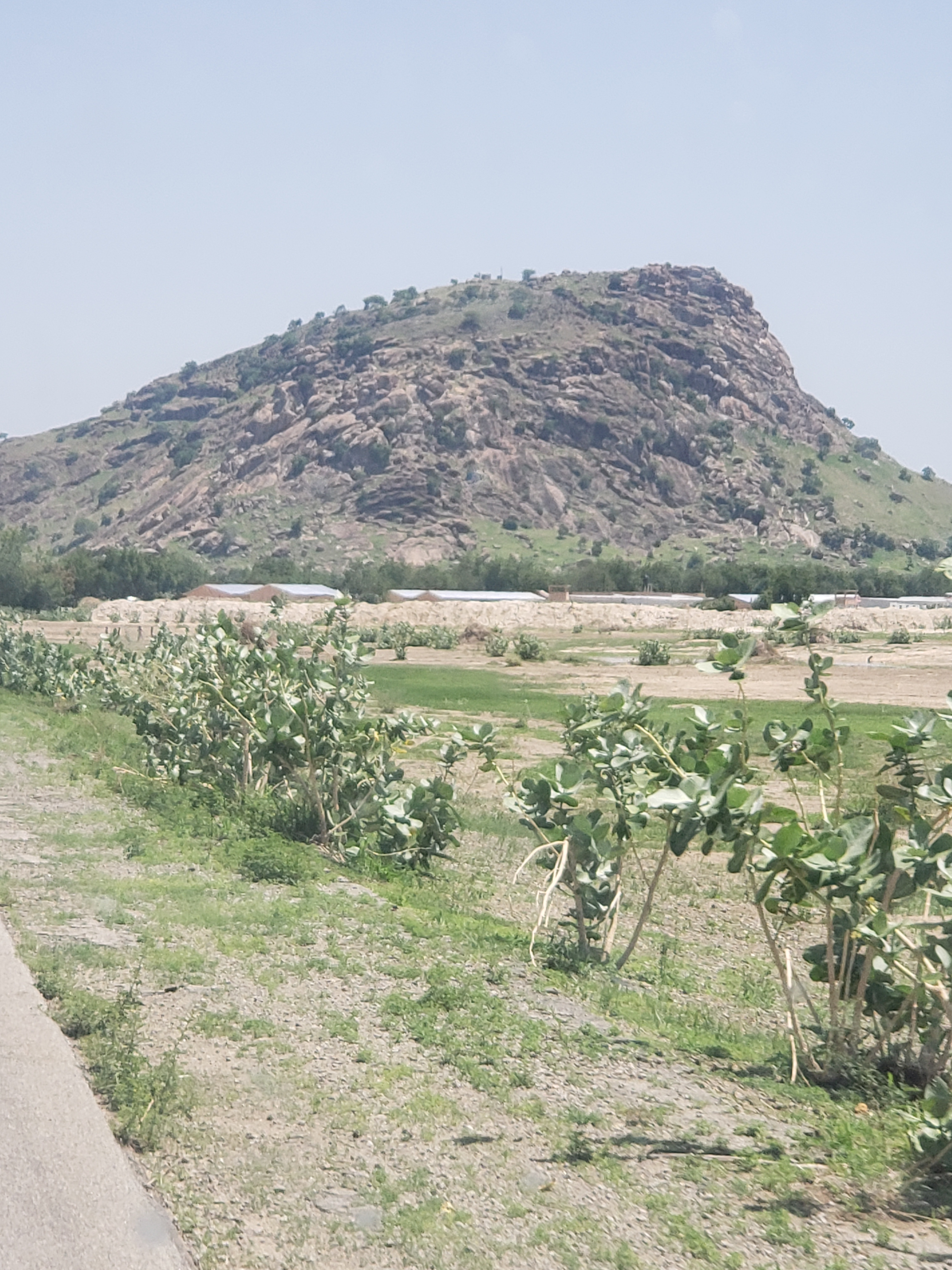
Mandara Mountain

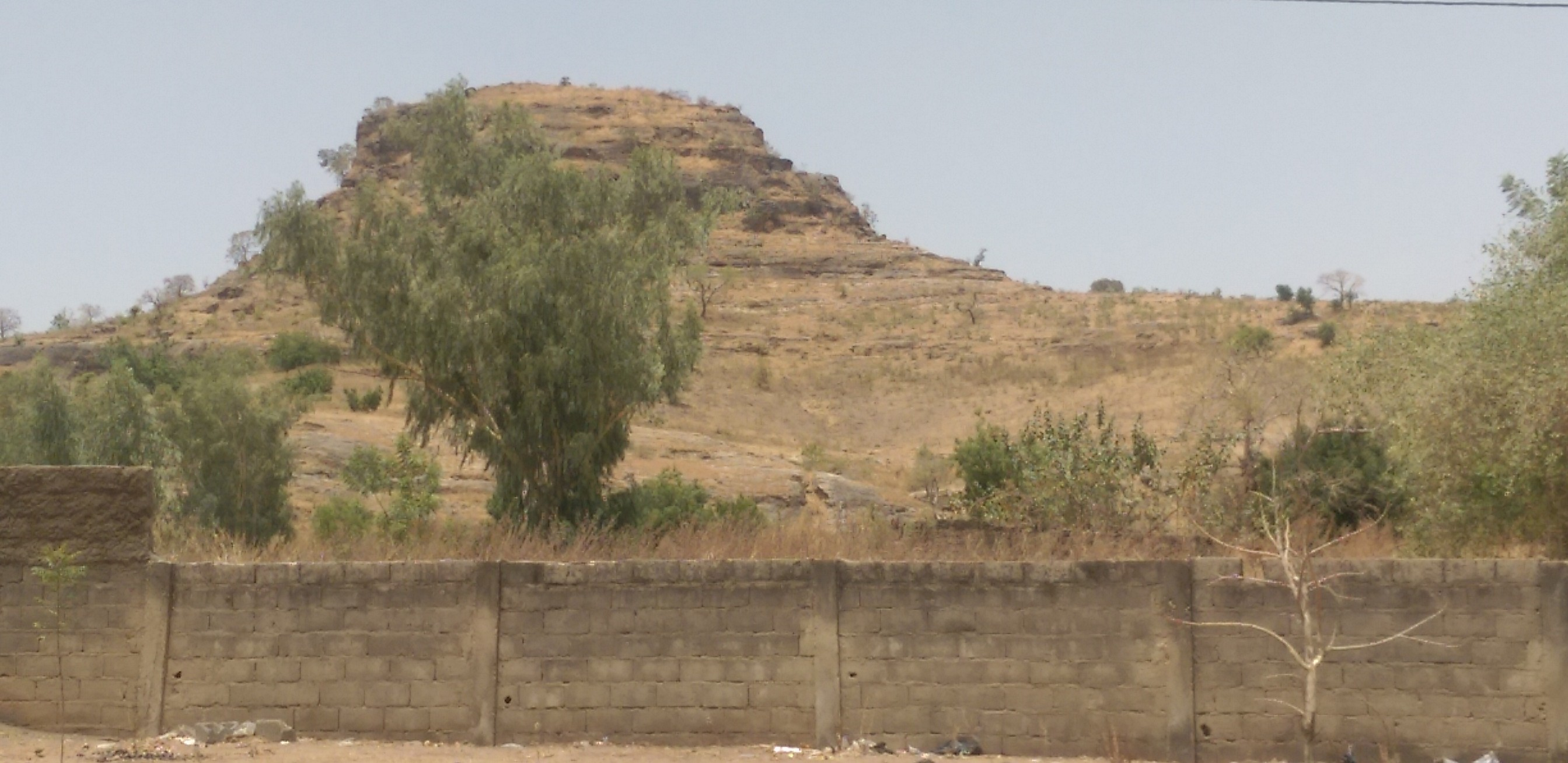
Mandara Mountain

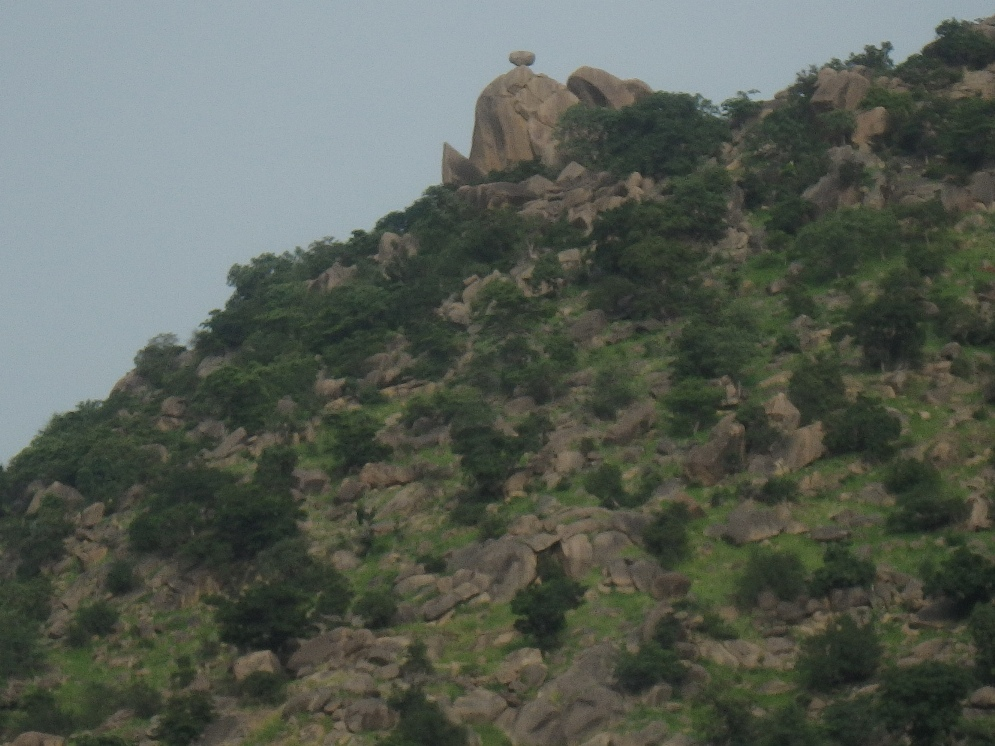
Pointed rock on the Mandara Mountain

=== Climate ===
From the bénoué Depression south, the North experiences tropical climate of the Sudan type. Average rainfall is between 900 and 1500 mm per year, decreasing from south to north due to elevation. Garoua, the major city, thus receives between 500 and 1000 mm per year. Rainfall in the Bénoué Depression is unpredictable, though it rarely drops to less than 1000 mm in any one year. North of the Bénoué Depression, a Sahel climate prevails. Here, the dry season lasts longer, and temperatures reach even higher levels. Provincial temperatures average 24 °C in the south along the plateau. In the Depression, they rise to 26 °C. North of the reservoir, temperatures climb as high as 28 °C.

Seasons follow a wet/dry pattern, with rough divisions in November (dry) and April (wet). The year begins under the influence of the harmattan winds in the dry season. In this period, temperatures are at their highest and rainfall is virtually nonexistent. This period of stifling heat continues until April, which brings with it torrential rains and lower temperatures. Rains ease up in June, though temperatures remain lower and humidity relatively high. Then in November, the province becomes drier and temperatures cool as a shadow of winter sets in.

=== Plant and animal life ===
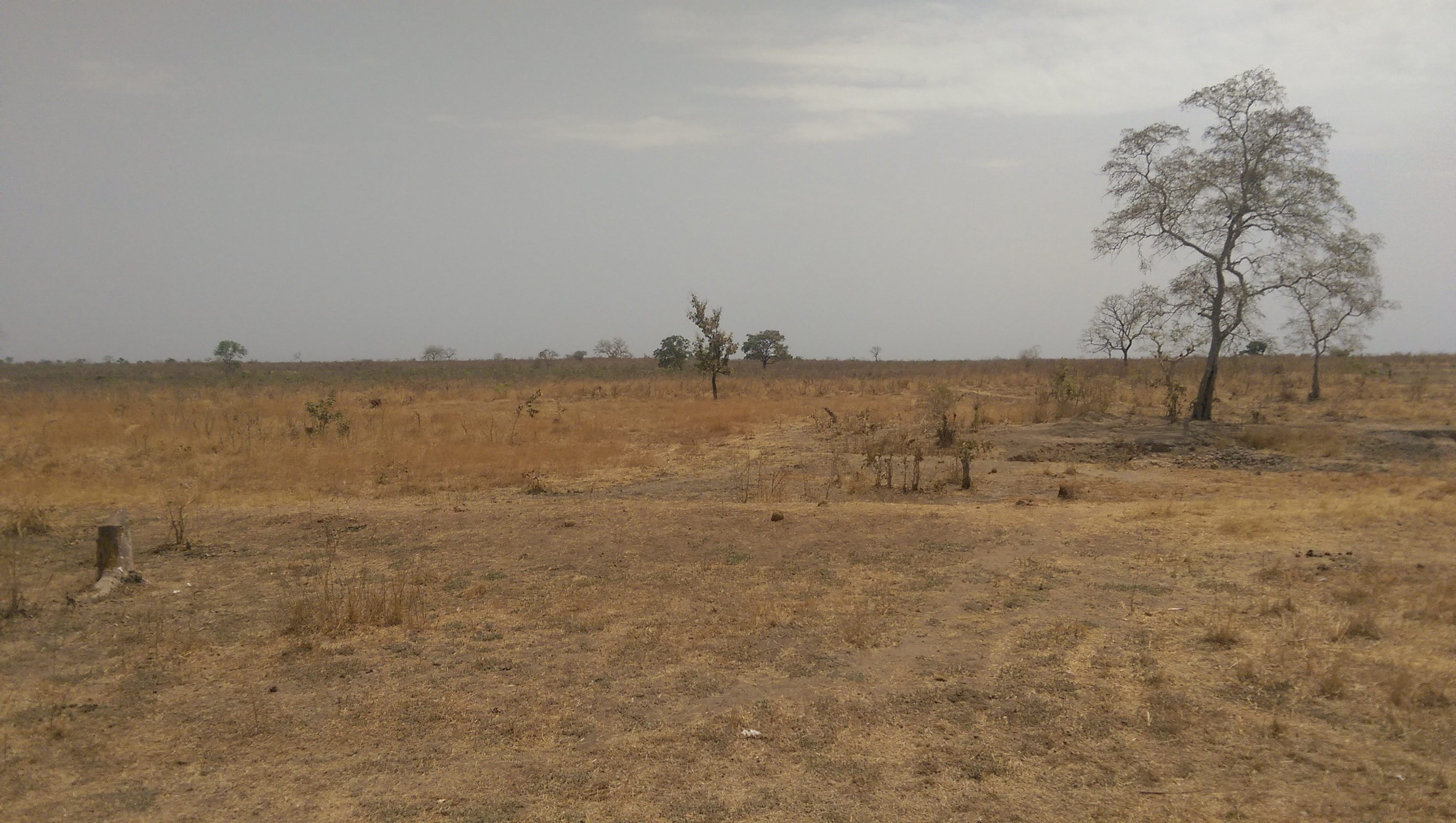
Environmental condition during the dry season

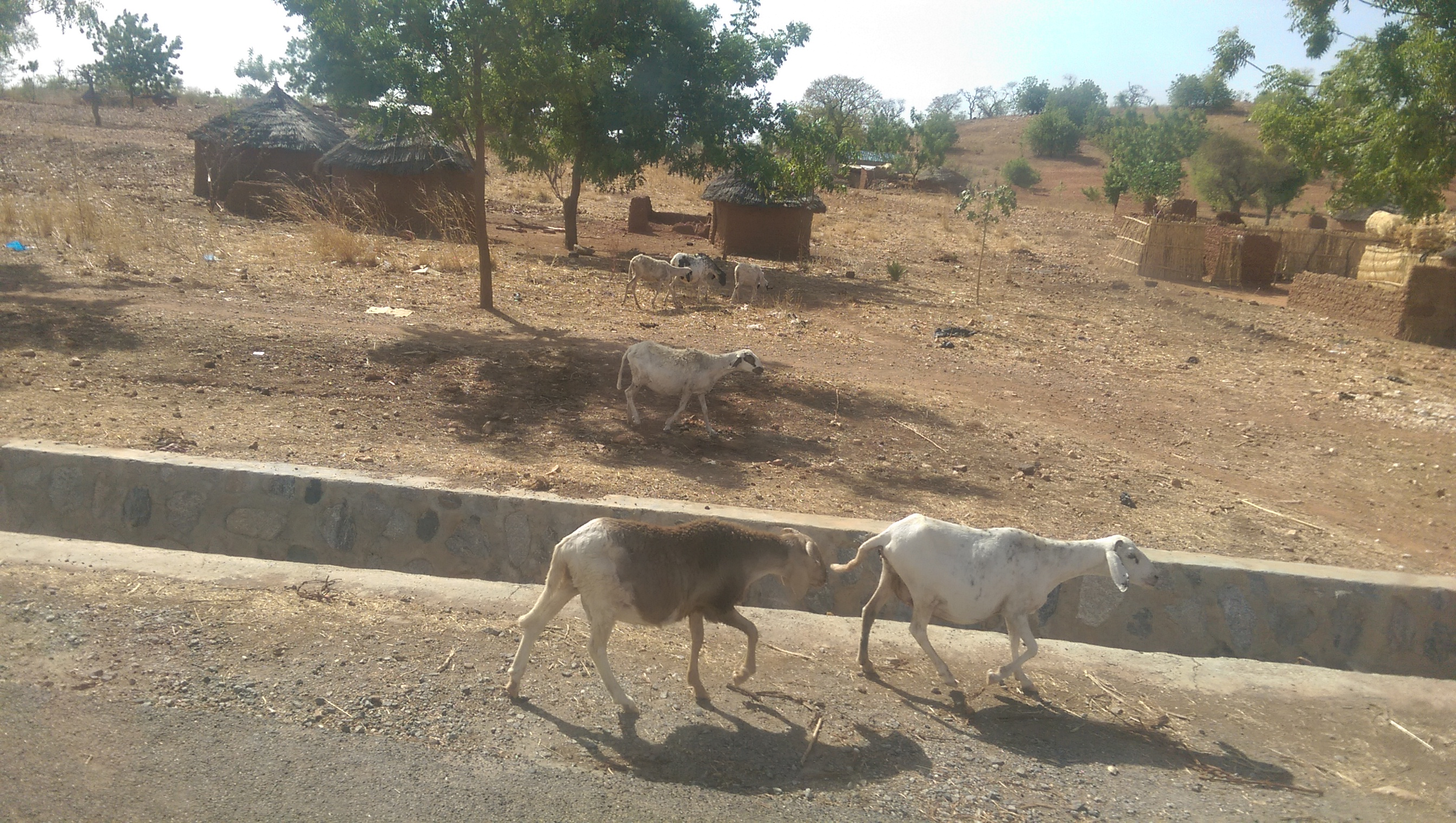
Animals left with little or no grass to eat during the dry weather

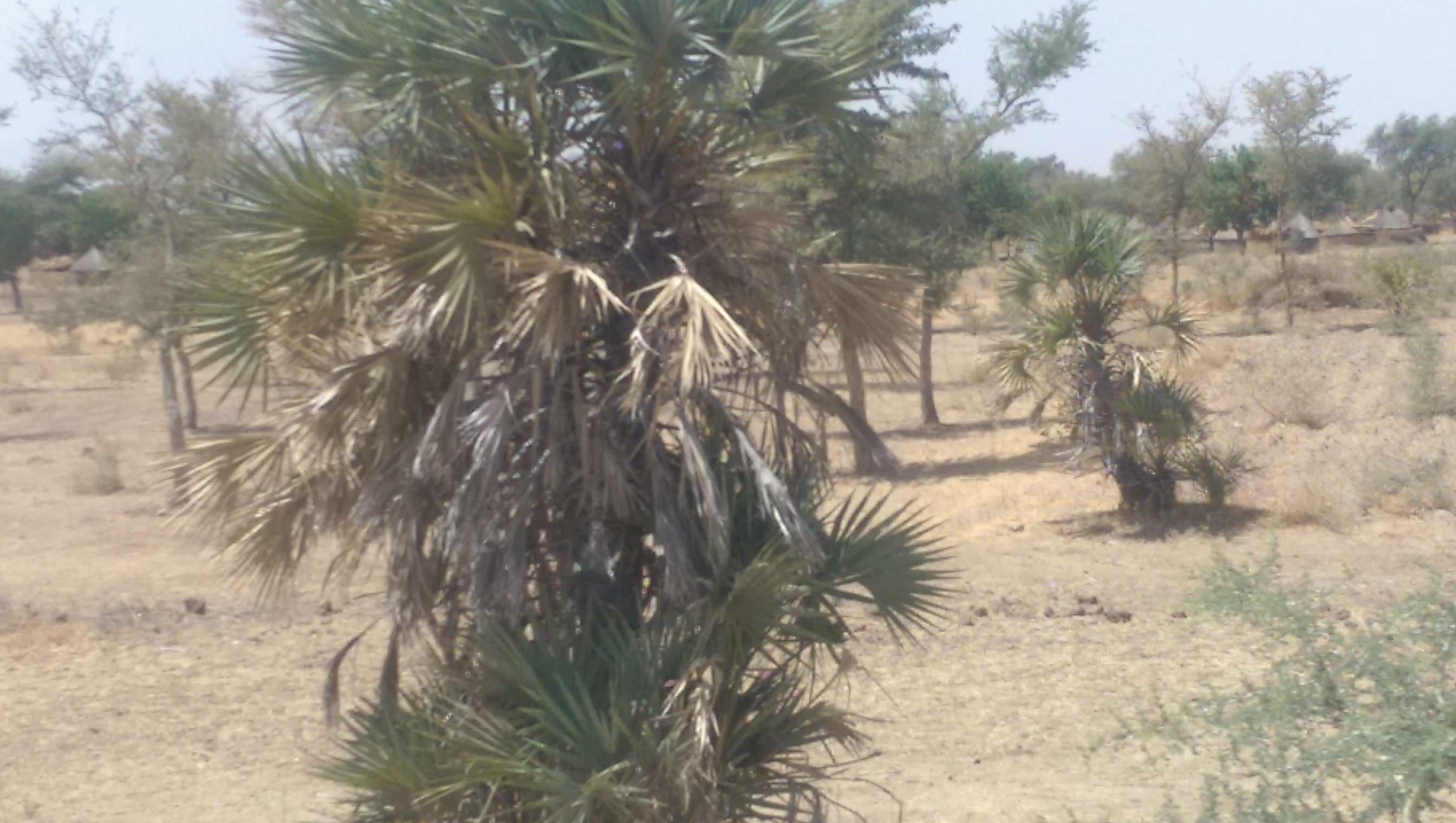
Dry palms due to hash climatic conditions

The North Province is a land of savanna. This begins with wooded savanna on the Adamawa Plateau with its thick grasses and isolated copses of trees. This territory was once more heavily forested, but repeated burning and livestock trampling has left this original vegetation only in the valleys. Moving north, the wooded savanna gradually gives way to Sudan savanna or parkland savanna in the Bénoué Depression. Here grass cover thins out, and trees become fewer and more isolated, and stunted shrubs become more prevalent. Common species include acacia, baobab, and various palms. Most of these have adapted to the region's harsh dry season and seasonal burning by growing thick bark and shedding their leaves during this period. This area has been categorised by the World Wildlife Fund as part of the East Sudanian savanna ecoregion.

After centuries of human habitation and manipulation, very little of the North's indigenous wildlife survives. Of the countless species that once roamed the area, today only hippopotami, jackals, various monkeys such as baboons, and various species of reptile exist in human-inhabited areas. The region's full diversity of species is today only extant in the handful of protected areas. The Bénoué National Park (Parc National de la Bénoué) protects 1,800 square kilometres southeast of Garoua at the province's centre. It shelters many large mammal species, including hartebeest, hippopotami, kob, and waterbuck, as well as smaller numbers of buffalo, giant eland, elephants, lions and reptiles such as crocodiles. It has been a protected area since 1968.

The 2,200 square kilometres Bouba Njida National Park (Parc National de Bouba Ndjida) is southeast of Garoua on the Chad border. Cameroon created the park in 1968 to protect the black rhinoceros and Derby eland. Many experts today say that the rhinoceros is now extinct in the area today. Other animals in the park include buffalo, elephants, giraffes, leopards, lions, and hippopotami.

Farthest south is Faro National Park (Parc National du Faro), which protects 3,300 square kilometres of terrain straddling the Adamawa Plateau and the Bénoué Depression. The park houses many reptile species as well as elephants, giraffes, and hippopotami. Today, however, poachers have wiped out much of the park's animal population.

== Demographics ==
Historical population
Year	Pop.	±% p.a.
1976	479,158	—
1987	832,165	+5.15%
2005	1,687,959	+4.01%
2015	2,442,578	+3.76%

=== Settlement patterns ===
The North Province is moderately populated, averaging 12 to 25 people per km^{2} in most areas. This density jumps to 25 to 50 people in the river valleys west of the Lagdo Reservoir and in the Bénoué Depression. North of Garoua and in the Mandara Mountains, where large populations of non-Muslim (often known collectively by the derogatory name Kirdi) were forced to flee years ago, density peaks at 50 to 100 people per km^{2}. Due to the major port located there, Garoua was at one point Cameroon's third largest city, though its population is 235,996 (2005 Census). The city is today a mélange of the region, with large populations of Fulbe, non-Muslim Northerners and immigrants from Southern Cameroon, as well as from neighboring Chad and Nigeria.

Dwelling units differ from ethnic group to ethnic group, but many follow a fairly common pattern. The house of the chief often forms the centre of a village, and houses are grouped around it with granaries nearby to help the villagers survive the dry season. Various fields of crops in turn surround homes. A common house type is a round building with a cone-shaped roof. However, houses of cement brick and roofed in sheet metal are quite common in larger settlements. Villages are often clustered along the main roads.

In contrast to the province's various settled peoples, the Mbororo Fulbe are nomadic and live in portable, tent-like huts (again, Mbororo is a derogatory word). They do establish semi-permanent settlements called ruga, however, to care for the aged and for women to raise children while their husbands are out to pasture.

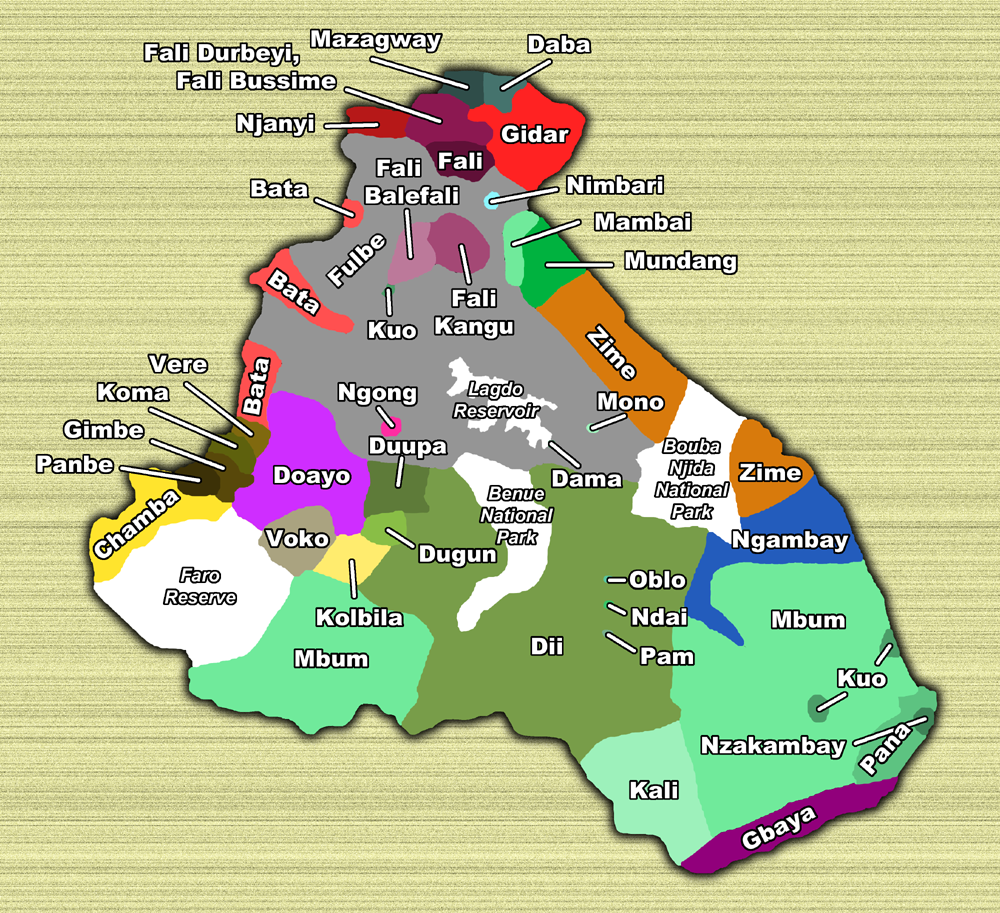
Territories of the North Province's ethnic groups

=== People ===
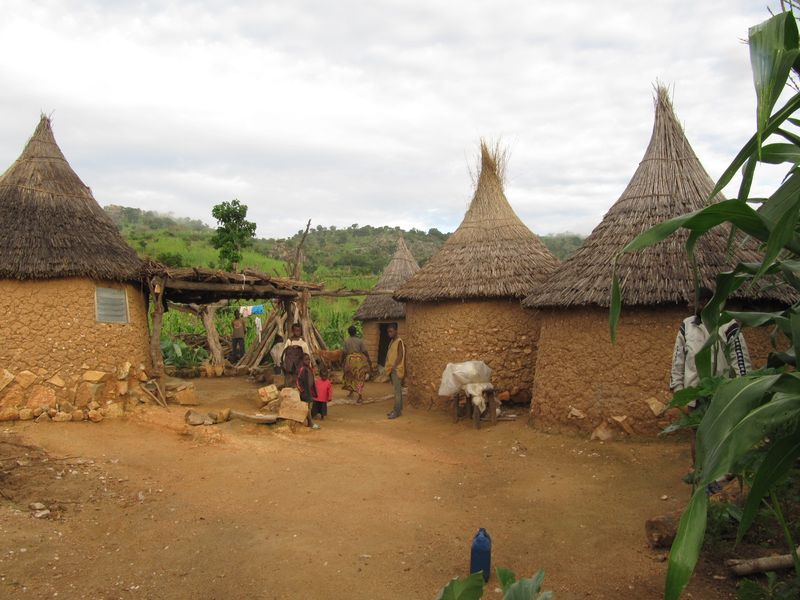
Magoumaz concession

With the exception of small populations of Hausa, Shuwa Arabs, and expatriate Westerners in Garoua, the ethnic groups of the North speak languages of three major language families: Niger–Congo ('Adamawa'), Chadic, and Central Sudanic.

The Adamawa-language speakers occupy the majority of the territory. The Mbum inhabit much of Faro division and a large southeastern portion of Mayo-Rey division, with the Dii occupying the vast area in between. The land west of the Mayo Rey is home to several peoples on a roughly south–north axis: Chamba, Fanbe, Gimbe, Komandera, and Vere. The Doayo live east of the river, and the Ndupa, Dugun, another group of Chamba, and the Voko of Poli village neighbour them to the south. The Mond capital is at Rey Bouba, and the Mundang and Mambeya live on the Chadian border at the northeast of Bénoué division. Four Fali groups, with territories in the Bénoué and Mayo-Louti divisions, form the last member of the Adamawa group: the Fali proper, the Fali Bussime, the Fali Durbeyi, and the Fali Kangu.

At the province's borders live various Chadic-language-speaking peoples. The Njanyi begin this band at the northwest of the Bénoué division. The Gude lie to their north. Then, from west to east, the northern border is home to the Gawar, Daba, and Guidar. The Bata and Zim complete the Chadic speakers, with three separate concentrations of the former along the Nigerian border in Bénoué and Faro divisions, and two areas of the latter at the border with Chad and straddling the Bouba-Njida park. The Bata are further divided into the riverain Bata (west of Garoua and along the Bénoué river and into Nigeria) and the inland Bata (or Njirai), who inhabit the Zummo-Malabo Hills.

As the only ethnic group in the province to speak a Central Sudanic language, the Ngambay make up the third linguistic group. They live in a large territory on the border with Chad between the Vina River and the Mayo Godi.

Though relatively newcomers to the region, the Fulbe or Fulani are the North Province's most numerous ethnic group. Their territory stretches through most of the province's centre, primarily in the Bénoué and Mayo Rey divisions. The Fulbe follow two distinct ways of living. The nomadic Fulbe, known to others but not themselves as Mbororo, are cattle herders. They roam the province's grasslands and south into the Adamawa Province, and their settlements are never more than semi-permanent. Mbororo are typically tall, thin people with a mixture of Semitic and African features. In contrast, those Fulbe who have settled are known as sedentary or town Fulbe. They outnumber their pastoral brethren, and they have over many years intermarried with their Sudanese neighbours, whom they now resemble. The North's Fulbe also recognize two main lineages, the wollarbe and yillarga. The groups are traditionally rivals, though they often unite for common cause.

Most North Province peoples speak their own distinct languages. Those with the most speakers include Daba, Dii, South Fali, Gidar, Adamawa Fulfulde (spoken by Cameroon's Fulbe), and Ngambay. Due to the Fulbe's numerical superiority and historical domination, Fulfulde is widely spoken as a lingua franca. French is the language of formal instruction.

=== Religion ===
Islam is the dominant religion in the north due to the cultural and political domination of the Fulbe. Those ethnic groups who resisted the Fulbe are collectively referred to by the pejorative term Kirdi ("pagans"), though they are not culturally homogenous and do not necessarily identify as a group. Non-Muslim groups include the Chamba and Fali. Some ethnic groups, such as the Mbum and the Guidar, are divided between Muslims and Christians.

== Economy ==
As Cameroon's third busiest port, Garoua has long been a site of commercial development in the region. Despite the fact that the port is new but a shade of its former self, Garoua remains the economic centre of the North Province and of Cameroon's Grand North in general. The city is today a crossroads for goods travelling to and from Cameroon, Chad, and Nigeria. The port is only viable during the wet season (July to October).

=== Agriculture ===
==== Sustenance farming ====
Many of the North's ethnic groups farm on small plots for subsistence. The chief among these are the Mbum and Duru. Sorghum, millet (both fast- and slow-growing), and maize are the staple crop throughout most of the province, though manioc (cassava) is also important on the Adamawa Plateau, and rice is especially popular in cities. Other crops include yams along the Lagdo Reservoir and at Tcholliré and groundnuts in the Mayo-Rey division.

Farmers often create their fields by burning an area of its vegetation during the dry season. Only fruit trees or trees useful for animal fodder or firewood are kept, such as baobab, faidherbia, and karita. Crops are planted at the first rains. Traditional farms are laid out in concentric circles centred on the village. These are surrounded by hedges or fences aimed at keeping out livestock. In the Mandara Mountains, these circular plots follow the slope of the mountains in terraces. Virtually nothing grows during the long dry season, so most food must be ground and stored in granaries for use during the rest of the year. Dry season sorghum (Muskwari) is grown along the river banks, relying on the moisture left behind as the rivers recede.

==== Commercial agriculture ====
Cotton grows well in the North's river valleys and constitutes the major cash crop. Most cotton farms in the region are under the management of the Société de Développement du Coton (SODECOTON), which was established in 1974. Groundnuts are also important in the southern half of the province, especially at the edge of the Adamawa Plateau. The plateau is generally unsuited to commercial crops due to its hard soils.

==== Livestock ====
Cattle are an integral part of the Fulbe way of life, particularly for the pastoral Wodaabe, who place great importance on the number of cattle an individual owns. They roam throughout the province and beyond while their town cousins keep animals around the province's central and northern settlements. The two major breeds are the humpbacked zebu, both the brown and white Fulani zebu, herded by the town Fulbe, and the leaner, lighter-coloured Bororo zebu, herded by the Wodaabe. Primary transhumance routes run through the Faro division and the southeast of the Mayo Rey division and eventually lead to Yaoundé, Douala, or farther south. Modern ranching occurs around the town of Faro, an endeavor made possible by the eradication of the tsetse fly from the region in 1974.

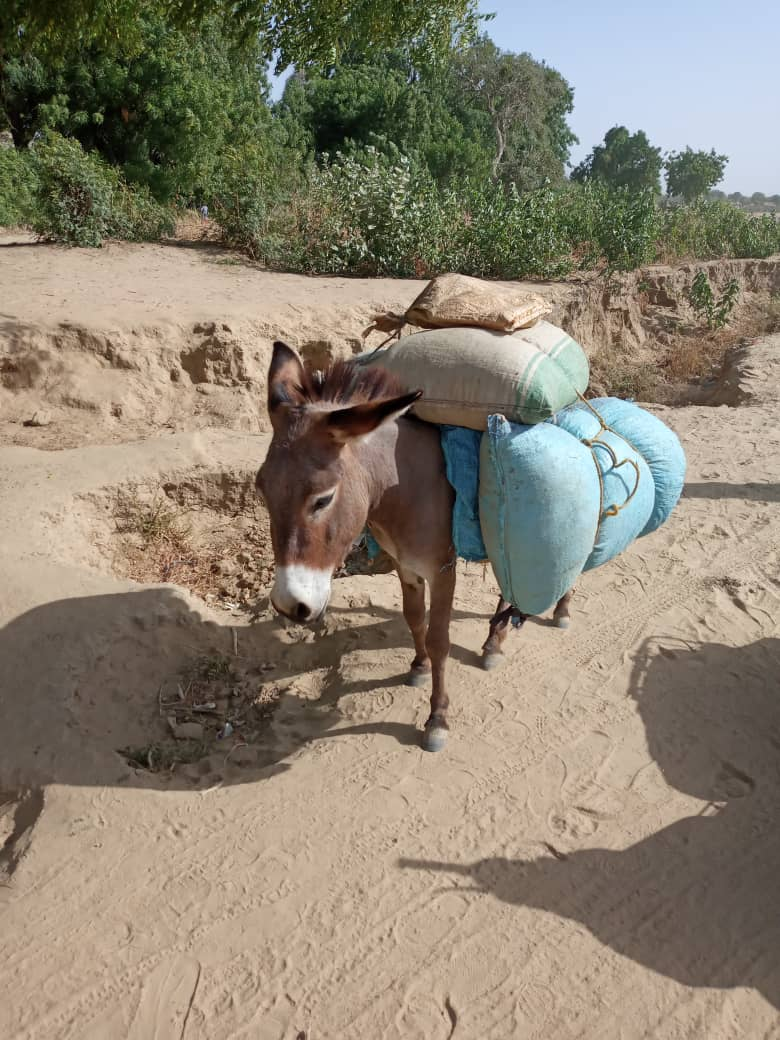
A Donkey used for transporting goods in Northern Cameroon

Other livestock raised include sheep and goats in the Faro division and on the border northeast of the Mayo Rey division. Most of these are long-legged breeds of sheep and goats that are larger and taller than those of most of the rest of Cameroon. Horses and donkeys are used as beasts of burden and transportation throughout, and the Bata are renowned for their expert skills at horse breeding. Fowl are common, particularly in the northern portions.

=== Industry ===
Garoua is the industrial heart of all of Cameroon's Grand North, and numerous factories dot the city. Among the goods produced in Garoua are beer and soft drinks, soap, cotton products such as textiles and cottonseed oil, construction materials, processed foods, and shoes. Figuil and Pitoa are smaller industrial centres. Figuil's factories produce cement and textiles, and those of Pitoa produce oils from groundnuts and cottonseeds. Guider and Touboro also have cotton gins.

Handicrafts are an important cottage industry for many of the North's inhabitants. Many of the region's craftsmen deal with fabrics, and weaving of everything from clothing to prayer mats is an important source of income. The North is also home to many skilled embroiderers who finish the many textiles produced there. An artisanat at Garoua provides a major outlet for such craftsmen to sell their wares.

Mining forms a small aspect of the North's industrial complex. Limestone deposits are situated at the province's northern bulge, and uranium deposits lie in the Bénoué Depression near Poli. Workers mine tin ore from the area northwest of the Lagdo Dam.

The Lagdo Dam and Reservoir, which holds 4 cubic kilometres of water, provides a major source of hydroelectric power for Garoua and the area north of it (including the Far North Province).

=== Transportation ===
Travel in the North is relatively easy thanks to its large network of roads, many of which are paved. However, the area where the Adamawa Province descends to the Bénoué Depression is characterised by winding turns, and traffic accidents are not uncommon. In addition, the area is accessible by air. Garoua is the site of an international airport, and aircraft may land at Poli, Tcholliré, and Guider on airstrips. Finally, the port of Garoua makes the region accessible by boat, and the Bénoué is navigable all the way to Port Harcourt, Nigeria. This waterway is impassable in the dry season, however, and road is the preferred means of transporting goods through the area.

=== Tourism ===
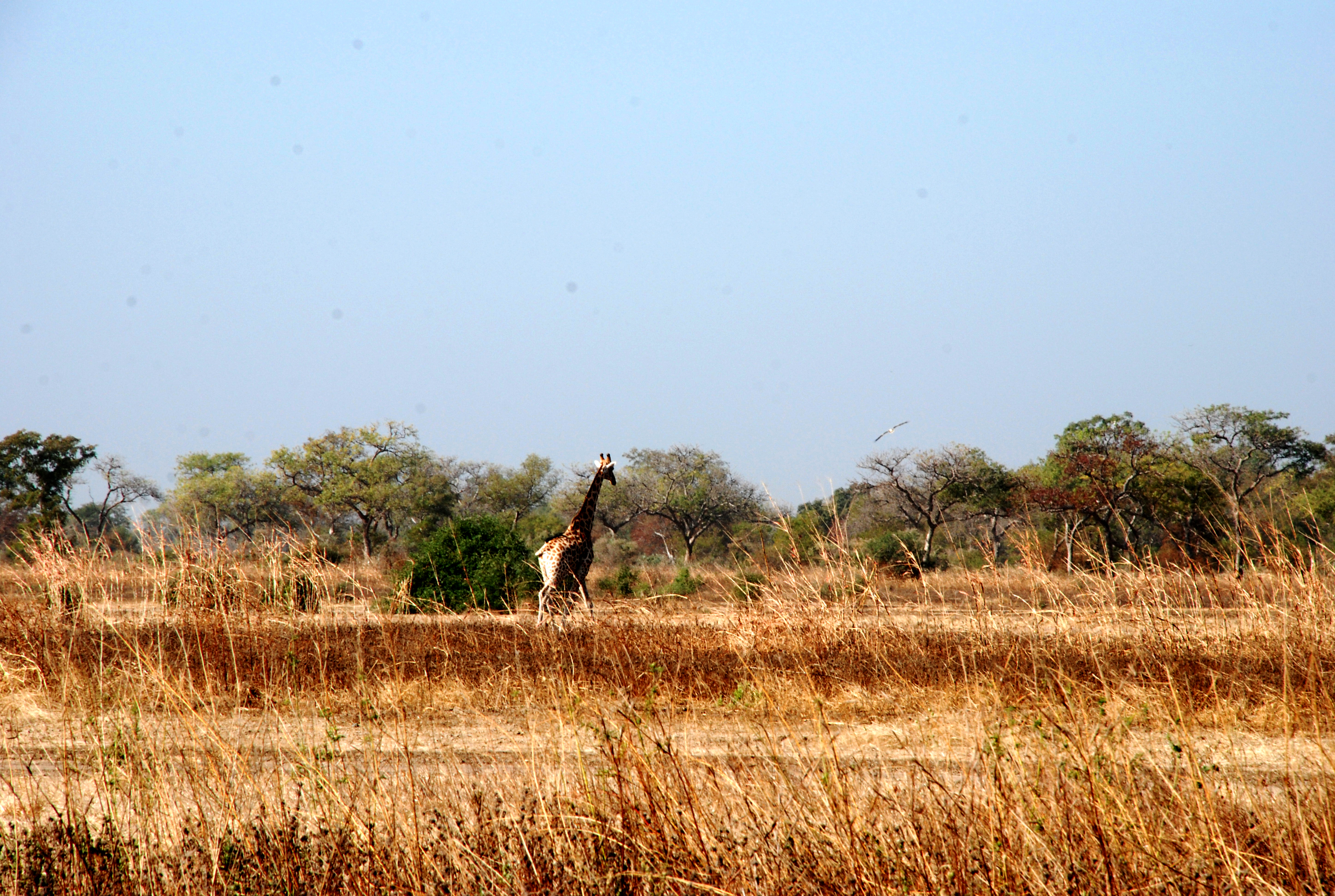
Giraffe in Waza Park during the dry season

Tourism in the North Province is largely centred on hunting in its national parks. Of these, most travel guides recommend the 1,800 square kilometre Bénoué National Park as the most accessible and least poached. The park is popular among fishermen as well. Hunters also visit the Bouba Ndjida Park, though its thick vegetation and large number of rivers make it considerably more difficult to travel in. Faro National Park is little visited, as it is the least accessible to vehicles and it has been mostly poached out. Those who wish simply to view wildlife usually continue north to visit Waza National Park in the Far North. There is also a zoo in Garoua where many of the area's indigenous species are on view.

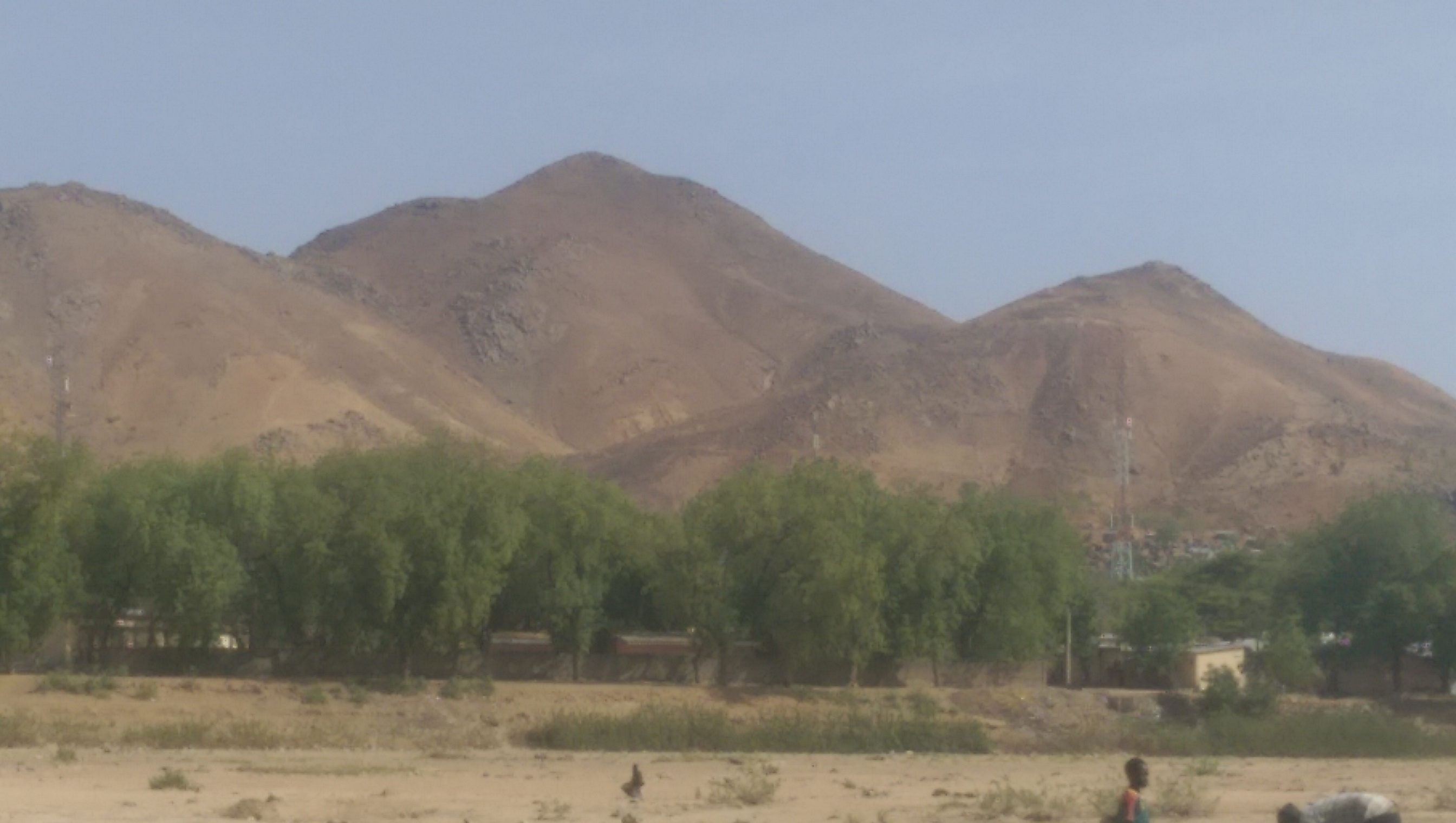
Mount in North Cameroon

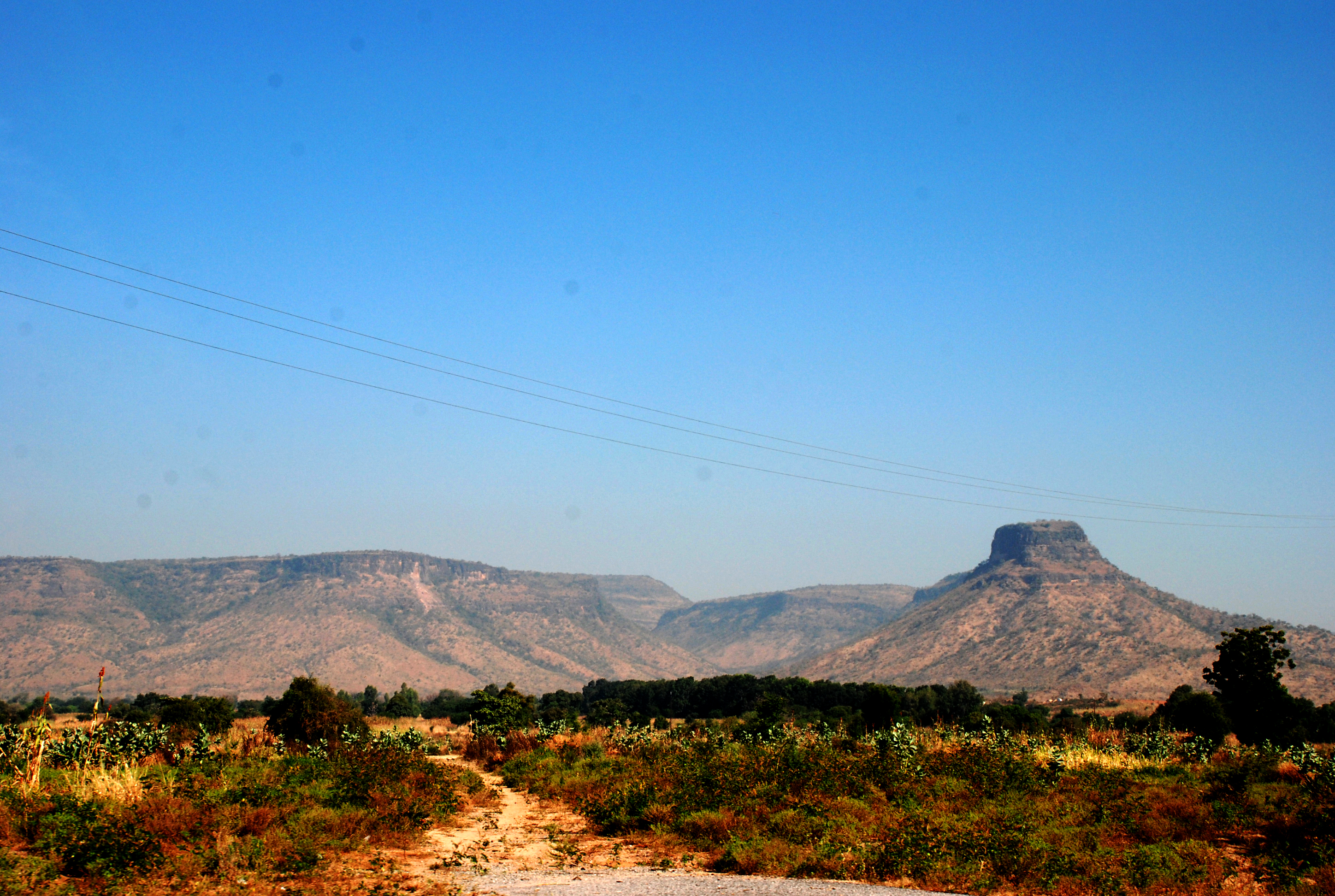
Relief of North Cameroon

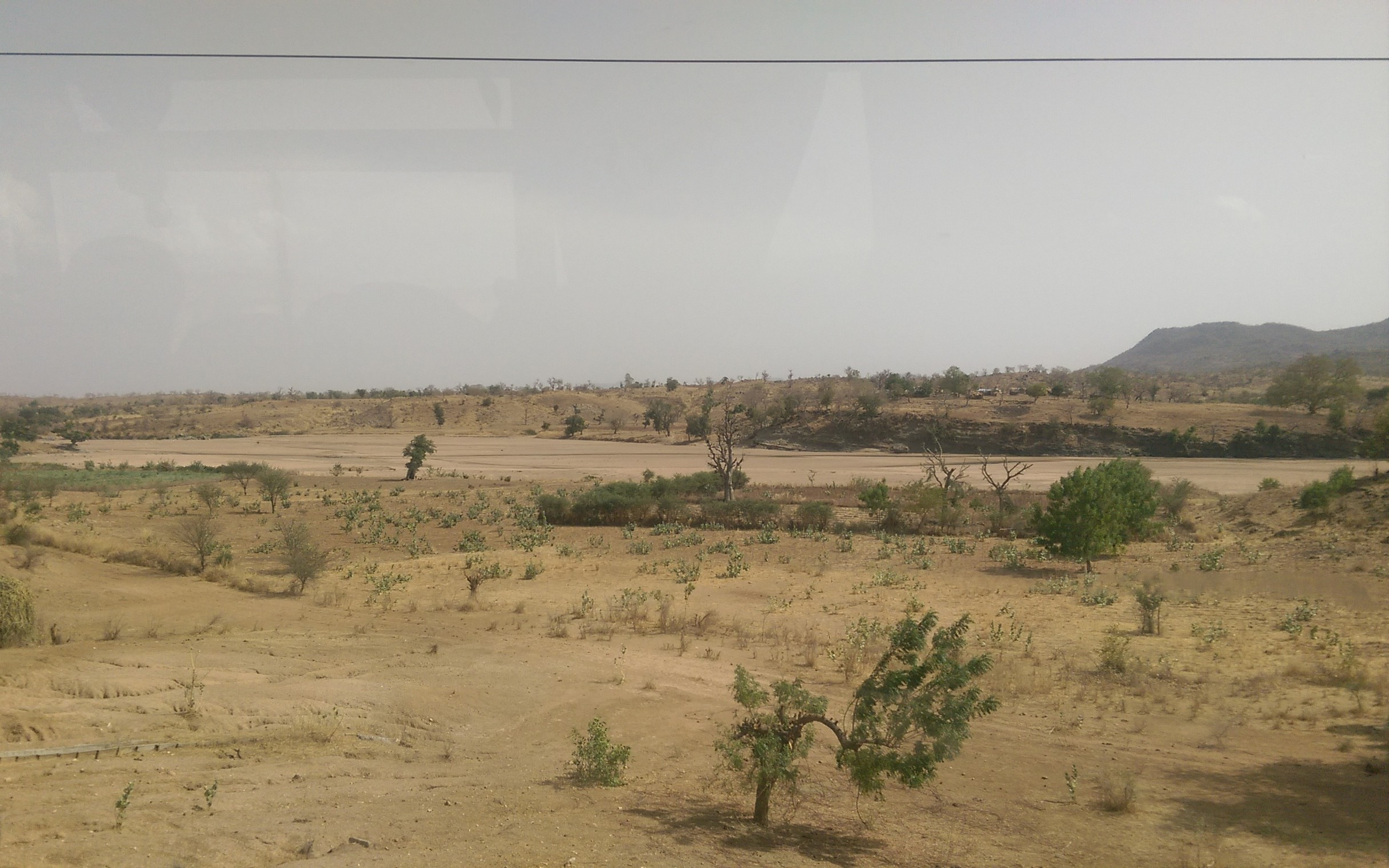
Mayo (water court) in North Cameroon

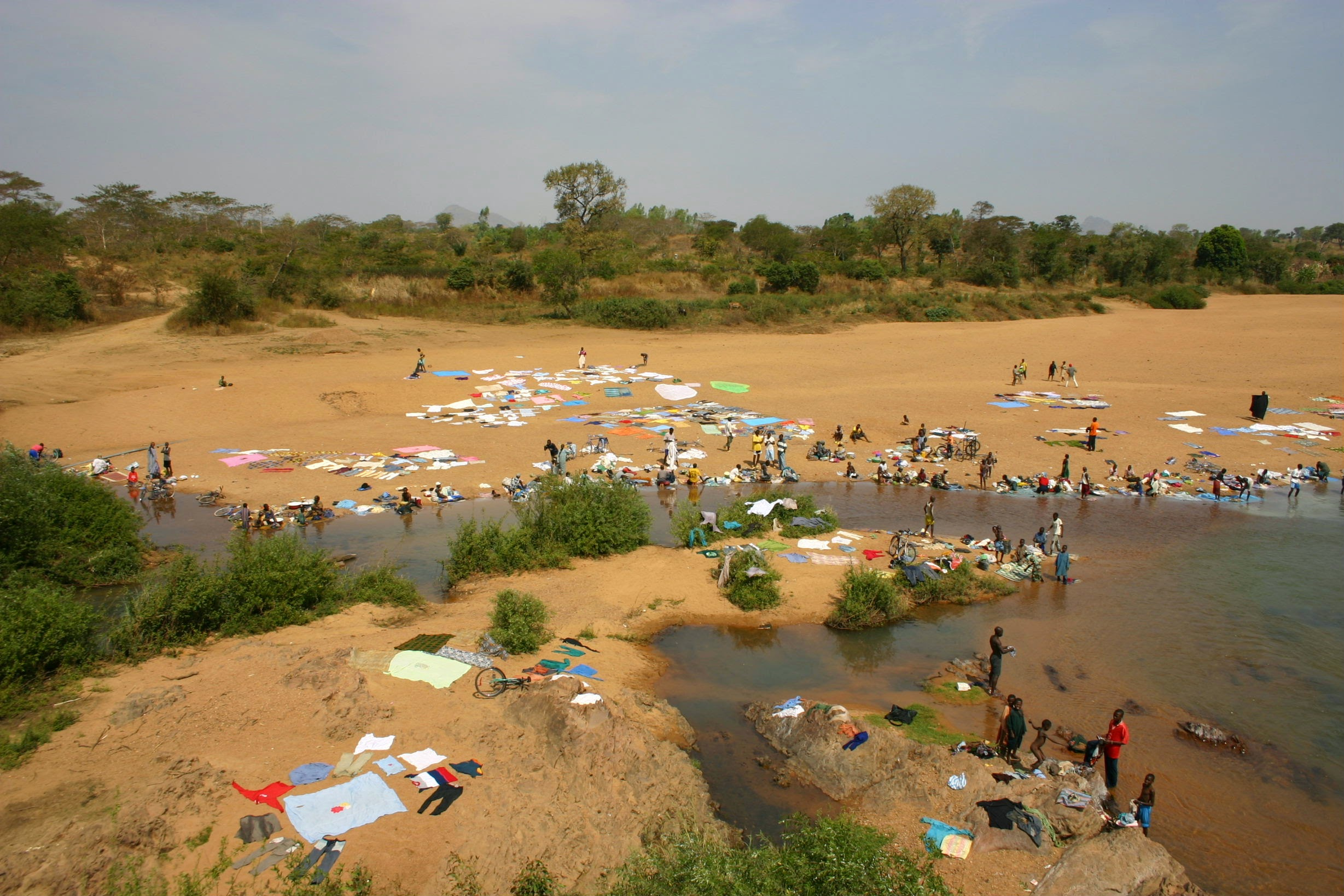
Laundry in the Benoué River in North Cameroon

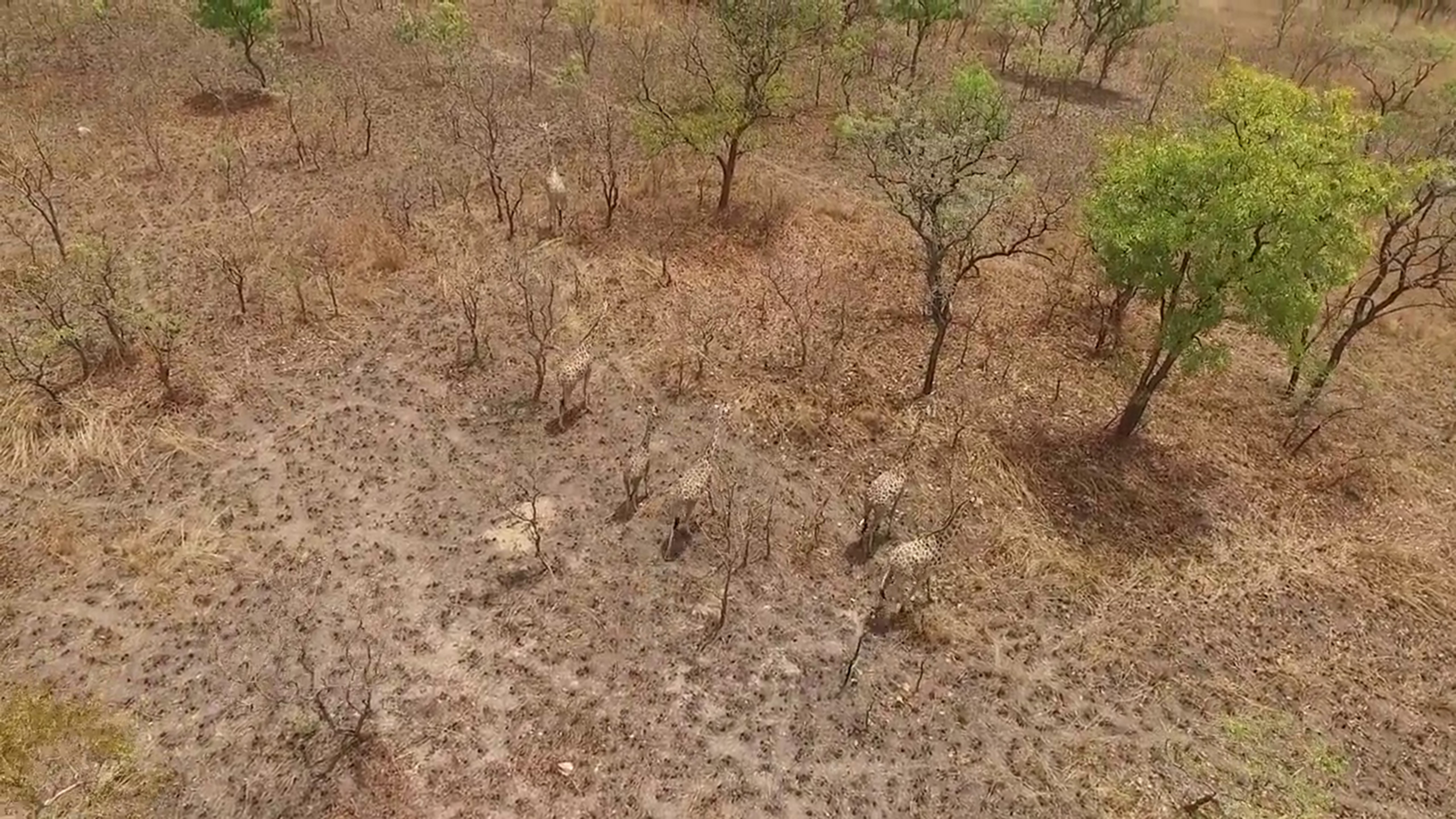
Giraffes in Bénoué National Park

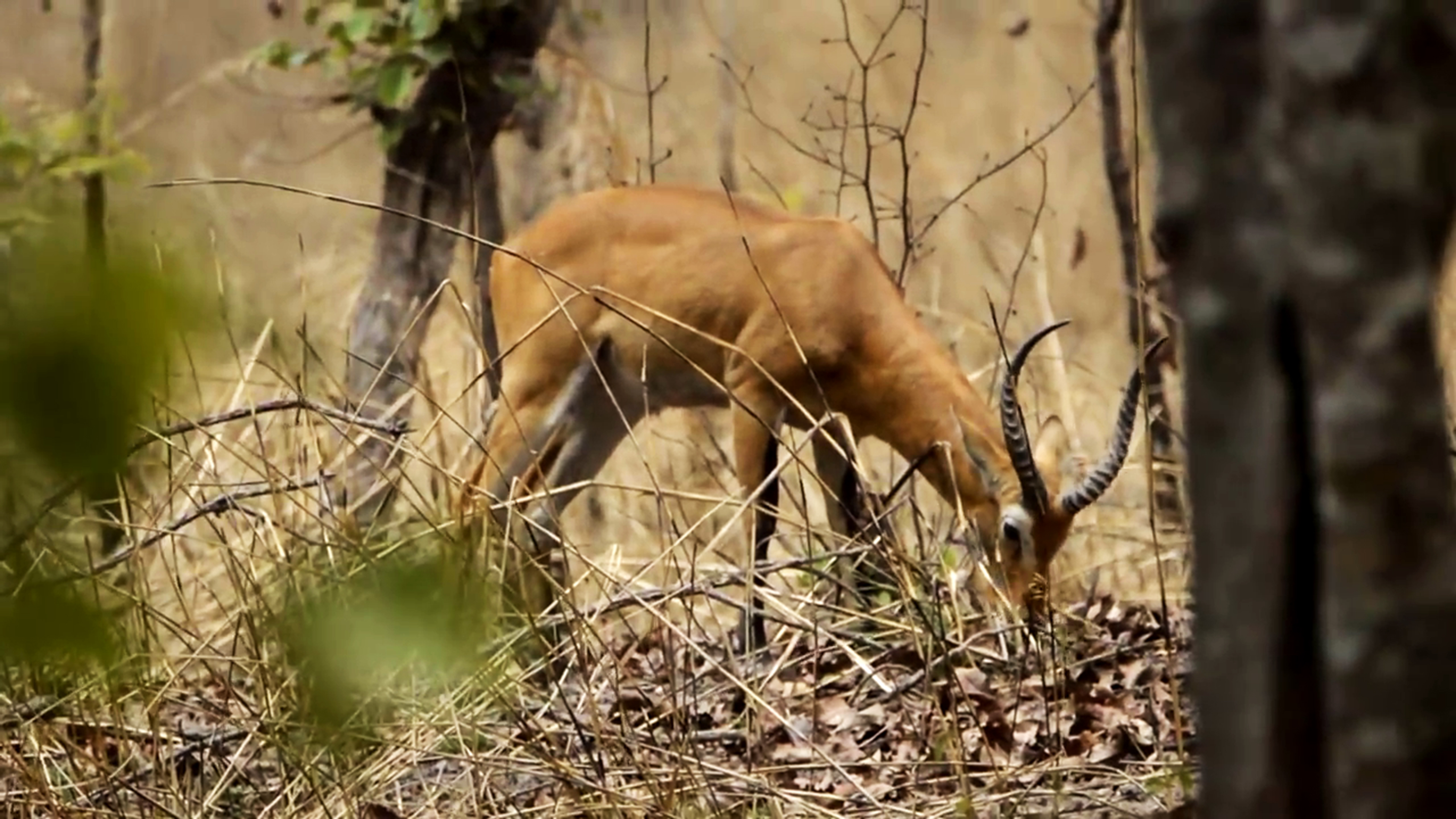
Antelope in Bénoué National Park

== Administration and social conditions ==
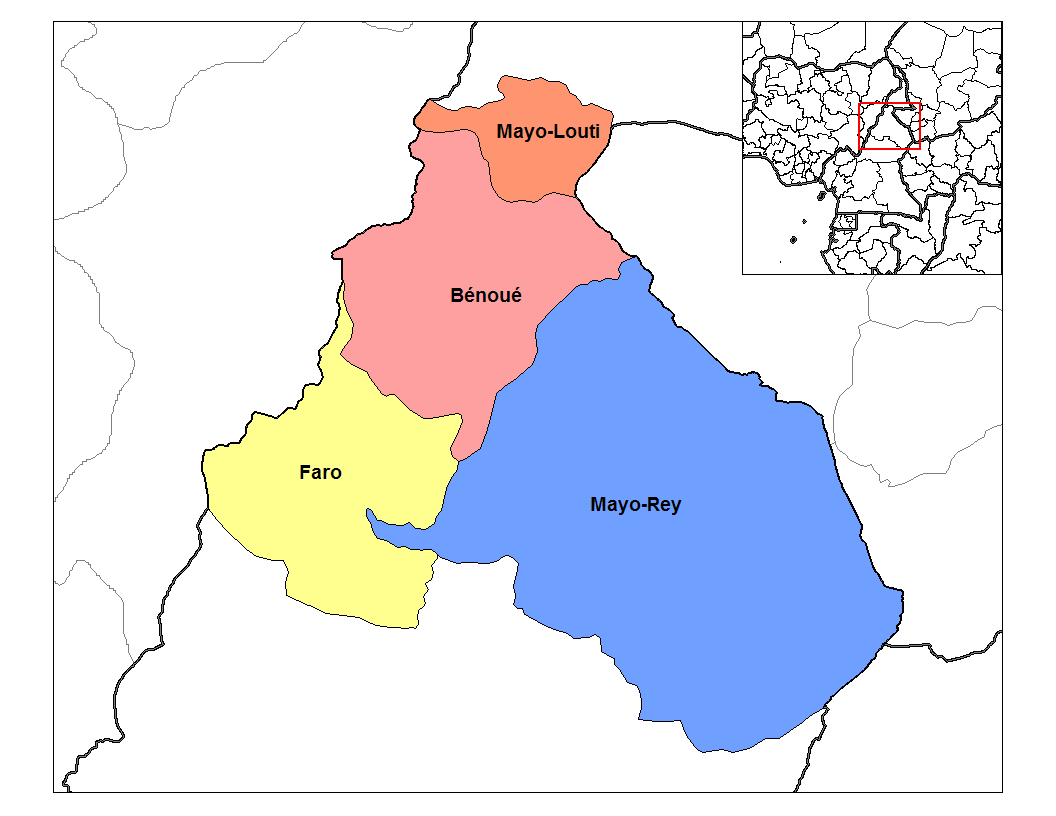
Departments of North Cameroon

The province is divided into four departments

1. Bénoué, with its capital at Garoua.
2. Faro, with its capital at Poli.
3. Mayo-Louti, with its capital at Guider.
4. Mayo-Rey, with its capital at Tcholliré.

These are in turn broken down into subdivisions. Presidentially appointed senior divisional officers (prefets) and subdivisional officers (sous-prefets) govern each respectively.

The North enjoys a relatively high level of development in infrastructure thanks mainly to its most prominent native son, Ahmadou Ahidjo, Cameroon's first president. During Ahidjo's administration, his hometown of Garoua in particular saw much governmental attention, including state-of-the-art buildings and a modern airport.

=== Government ===
The Union Nationale pour la Démocratie et le Progrès (UNDP) is the most important political party in the area due to its large base of Fulbe supporters. The UNDP has not presented much of a front in several years, however, because the ruling party, the Rassemblement démocratique du peuple camerounais RDPC, is careful to represent Fulbe interests.

==== Traditional political organisation ====
In traditional Fulbe culture, several lamidos rule over individual populations of Fulbe subjects. The government of Cameroon allows these individuals to exercise relatively wide-reaching powers, so they can make laws, judge disputes, and intern prisoners. As the Fulbe possessed an independent emirate until relatively recently, they hold this traditional political structure in high regard. However, human rights groups have pointed to these extra-governmental leaders as some of Cameroon's most egregious human-rights abusers. The prisons at Bibémi, Gashiga, Rey Bouba and Tchéboa are particularly maligned, for example, and some groups even accuse lamidos of keeping slaves from the various Kirdi ethnic groups.

Many of the North's smaller ethnic groups maintain traditional political organisation. The Bata divide themselves into several independent chiefdoms, for example. In some of these groups, however, traditional chiefs are mere figureheads. In others, the position does not exist at all.

=== Education ===
The population of the North is one of Cameroon's lesser educated due both to traditional culture and to a dearth of schools. The cultural hindrance comes from the traditional role of Fulbe women; girls marry as young as age ten or eleven, and schooling typically stops at this time. Exacerbating the problem is the fact that fewer than 300 schools exist in a province of almost 1,500 villages. This compels parents interested in educating their children to send them away for most of the year, often to large towns where they must fend for themselves or stay with relatives. However, when agriculture forms such an integral part of most of the province's citizens, such a prospect may be tenuous at best.

=== Health ===
Like schools, hospitals in the North must serve a large number of spread-out villages. Most health centres are in larger towns or cities, necessitating long-distance travel for some citizens to receive care.

Malaria is a major health concern. Similarly, fly-borne diseases such as dysentery sometimes break out, especially in more urbanised centres. Schistosomiasis is also a concern, though locals claim that the Lagdo Reservoir is free of the snails that carry the disease.

=== Cultural life ===
The Fulbe observe traditional Islamic holidays such as Ramadan and the Feast of the Ram. In addition, most of the province's non-Muslim peoples maintain a lively traditional culture that includes a number of special ceremonies, dances, and holidays. One of these is the Cock Festival, in which the nephew of the head of a family kills a cock and throws it into a fire; should the cock fall onto its right side, it is considered a good omen. The Tupuri people also perform the Gouma, or the Dance of the Cock, a cacophony of drumming and tambourines and circles of long sticks. The Lam of the Guider people is a ceremony to display marriageable girls.

Traditional dance of the peoples of North Cameroon

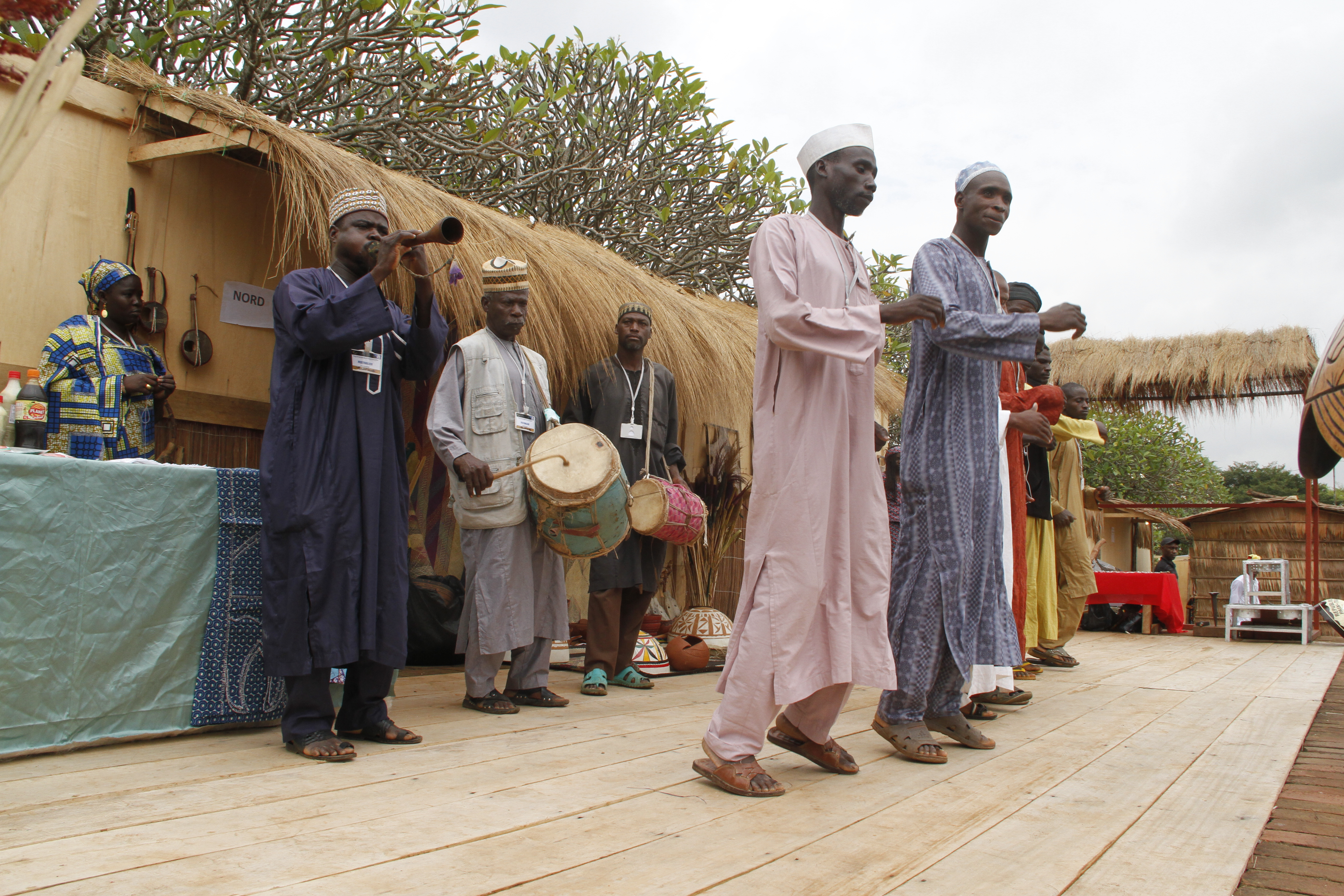

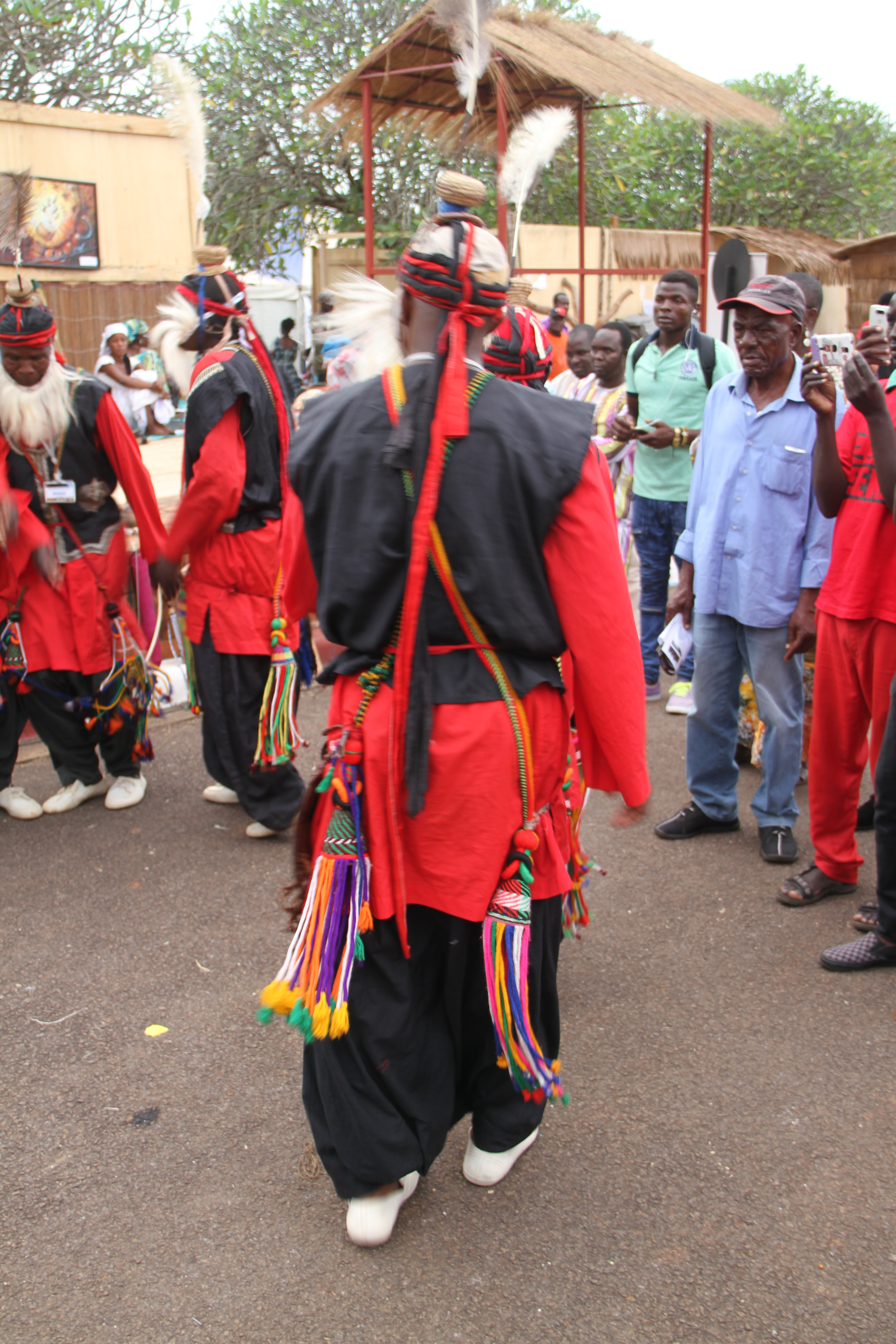

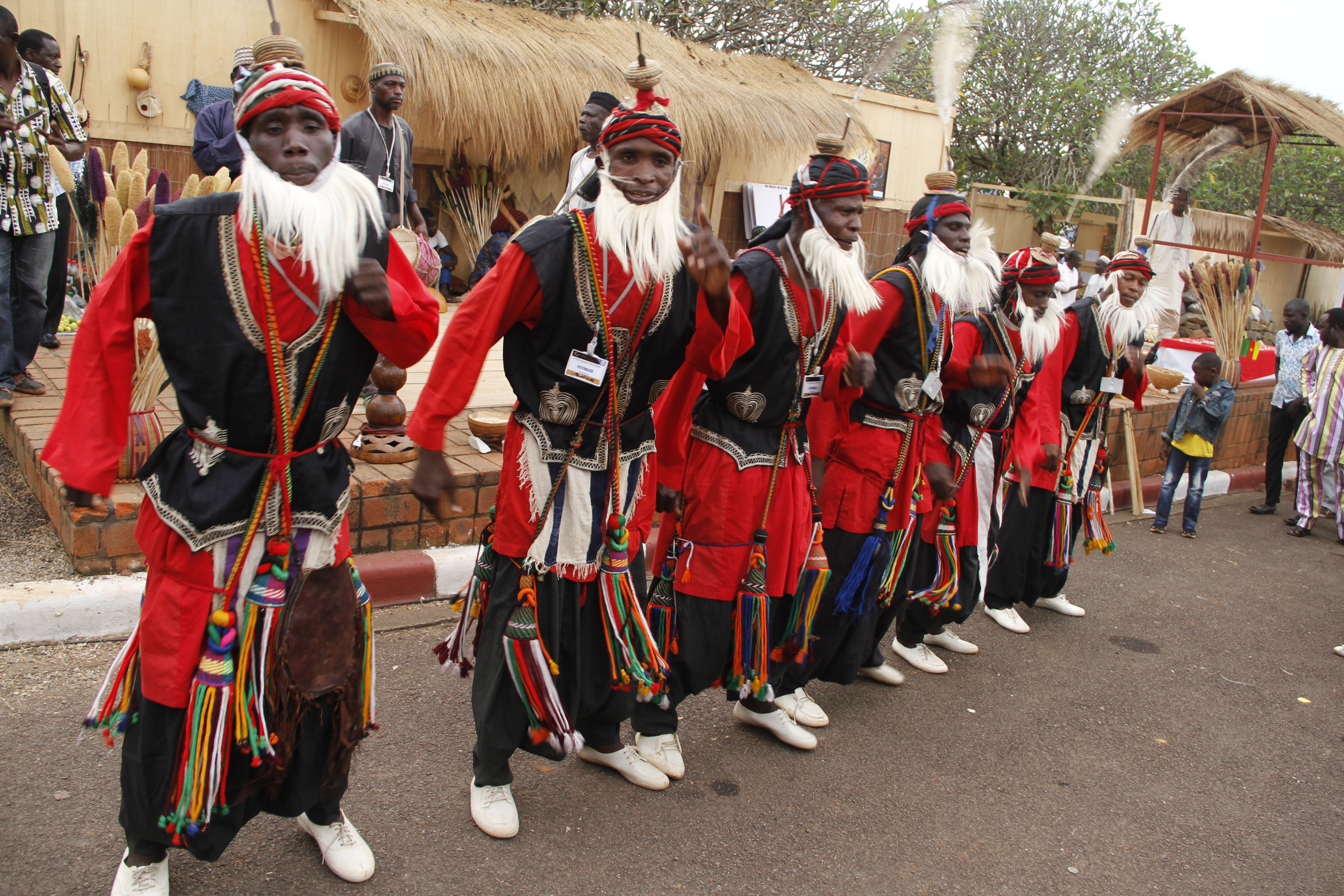

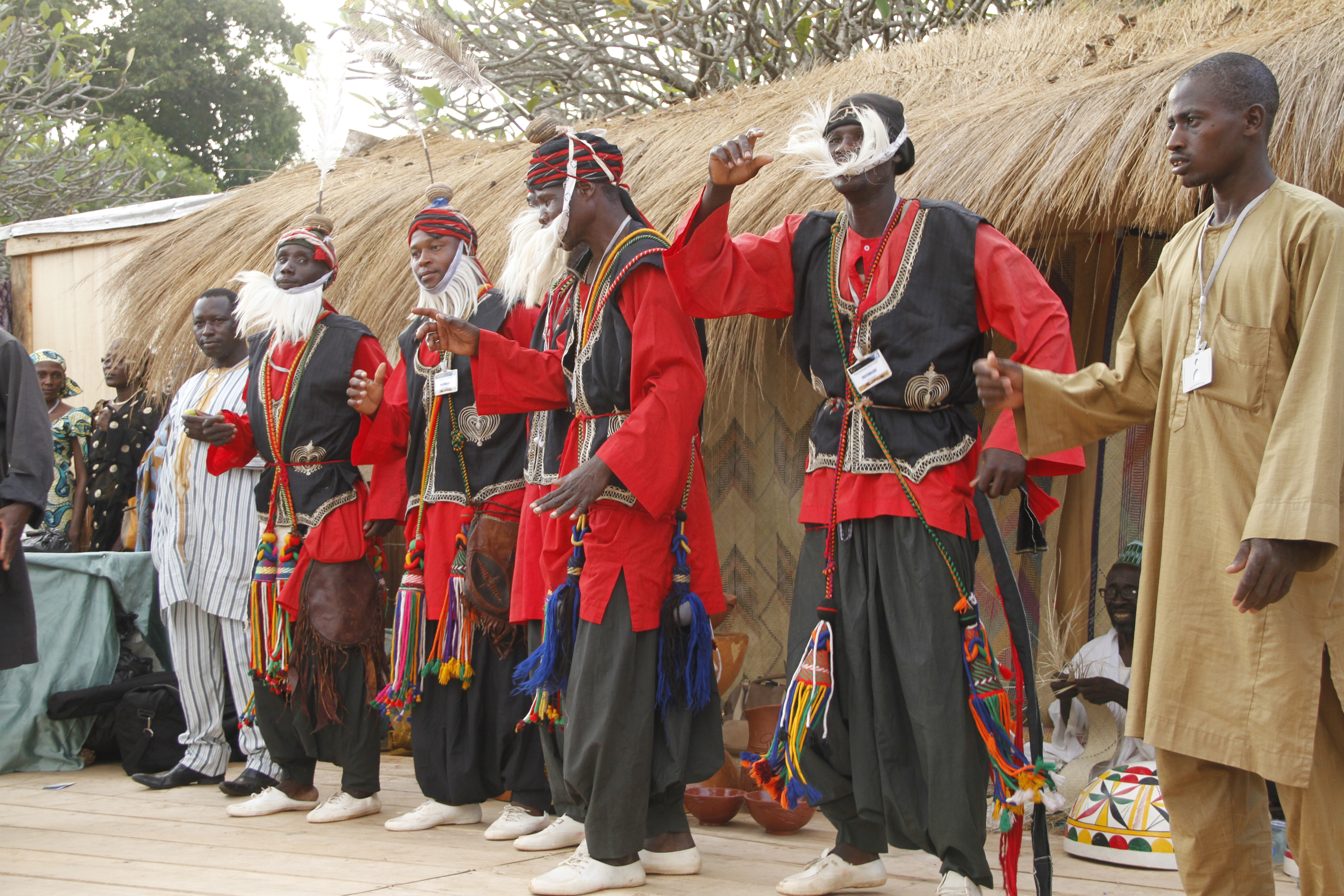

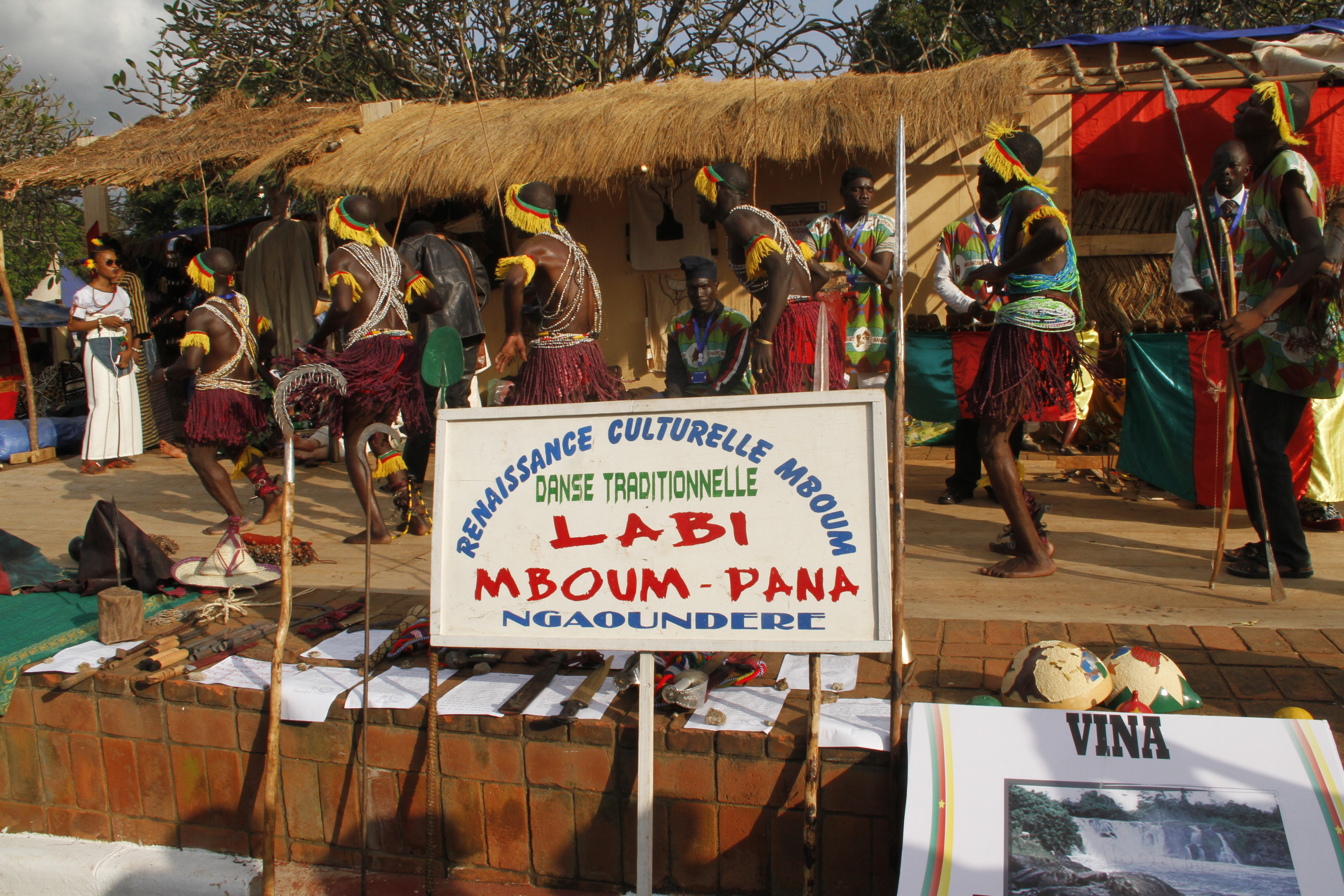

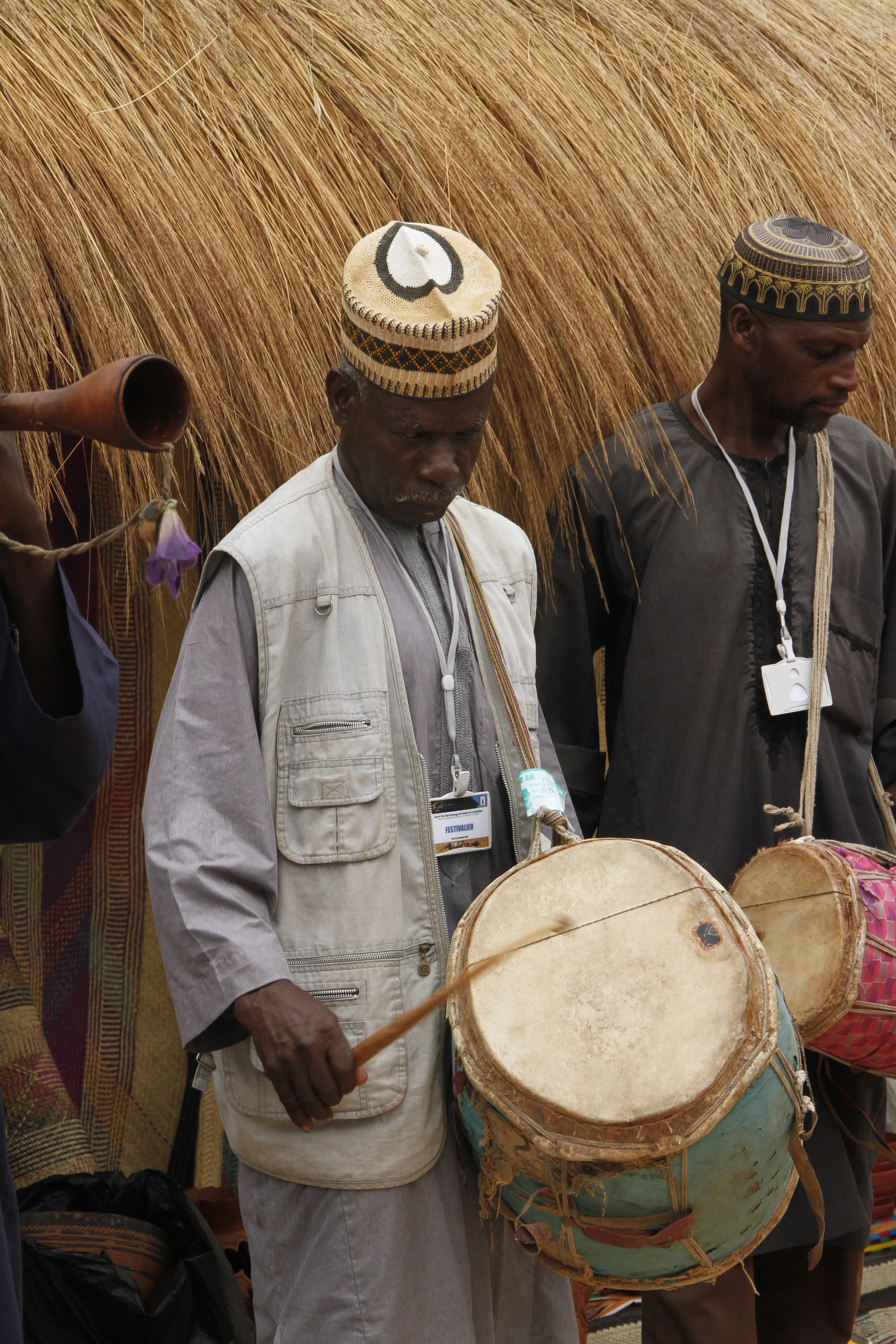
Tam-tam Player

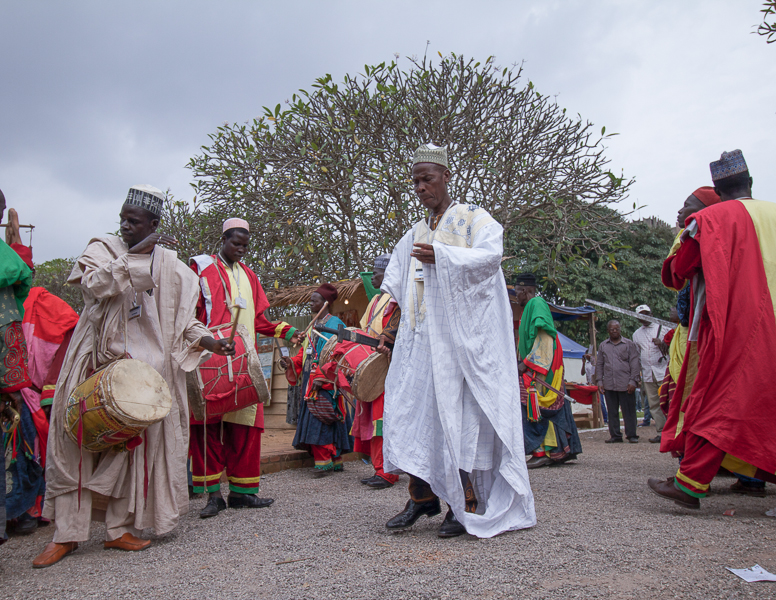
Traditional dance accessories

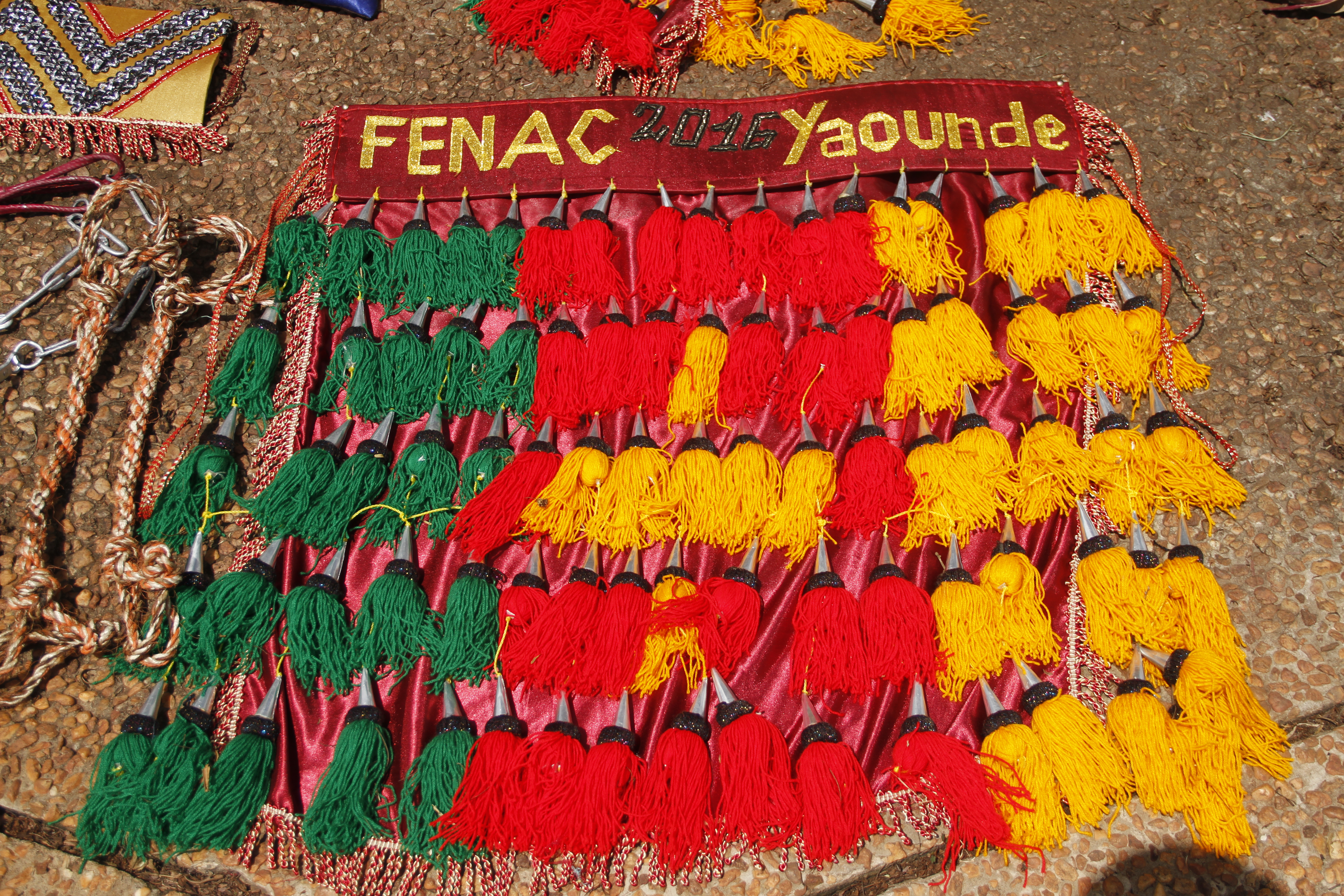

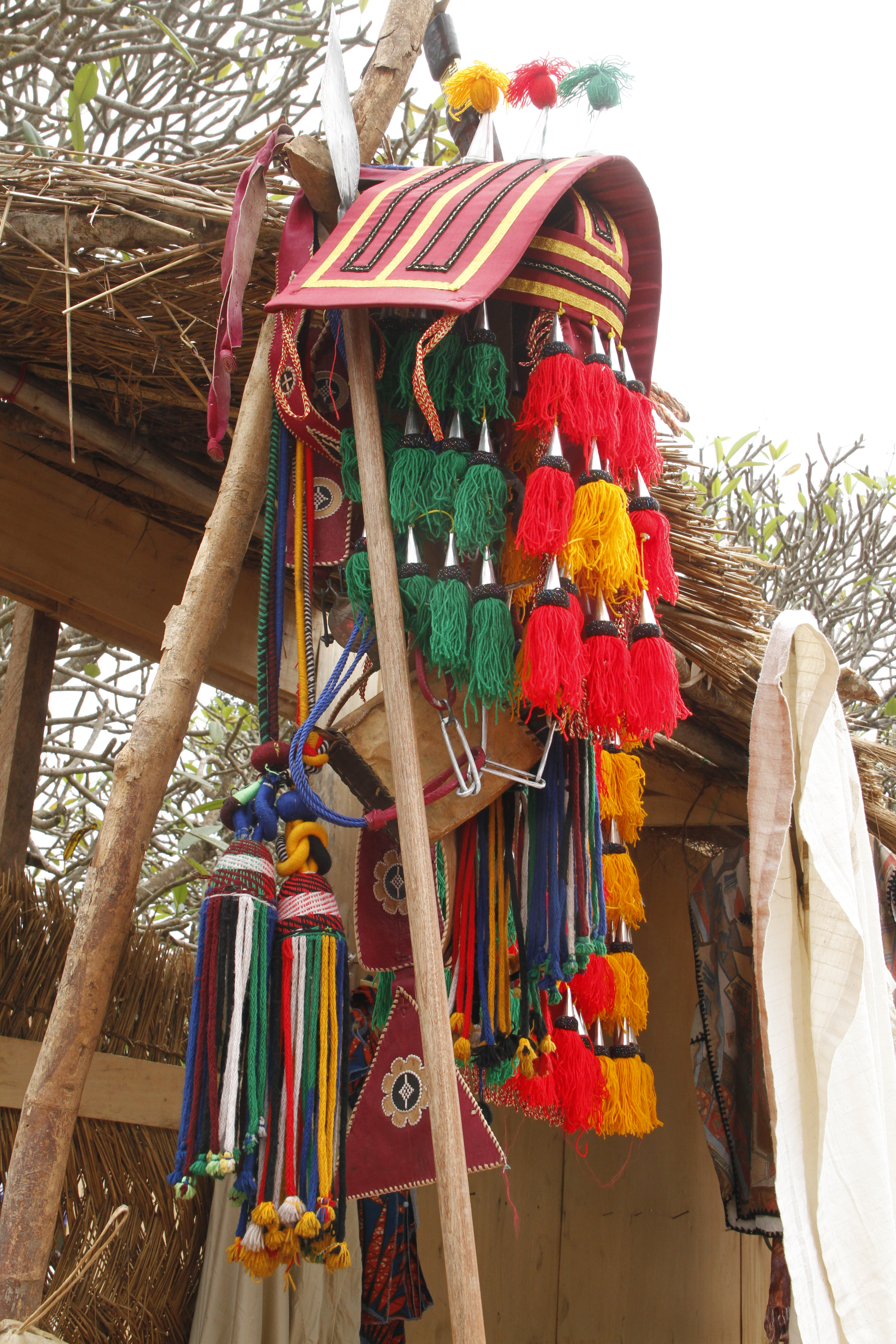

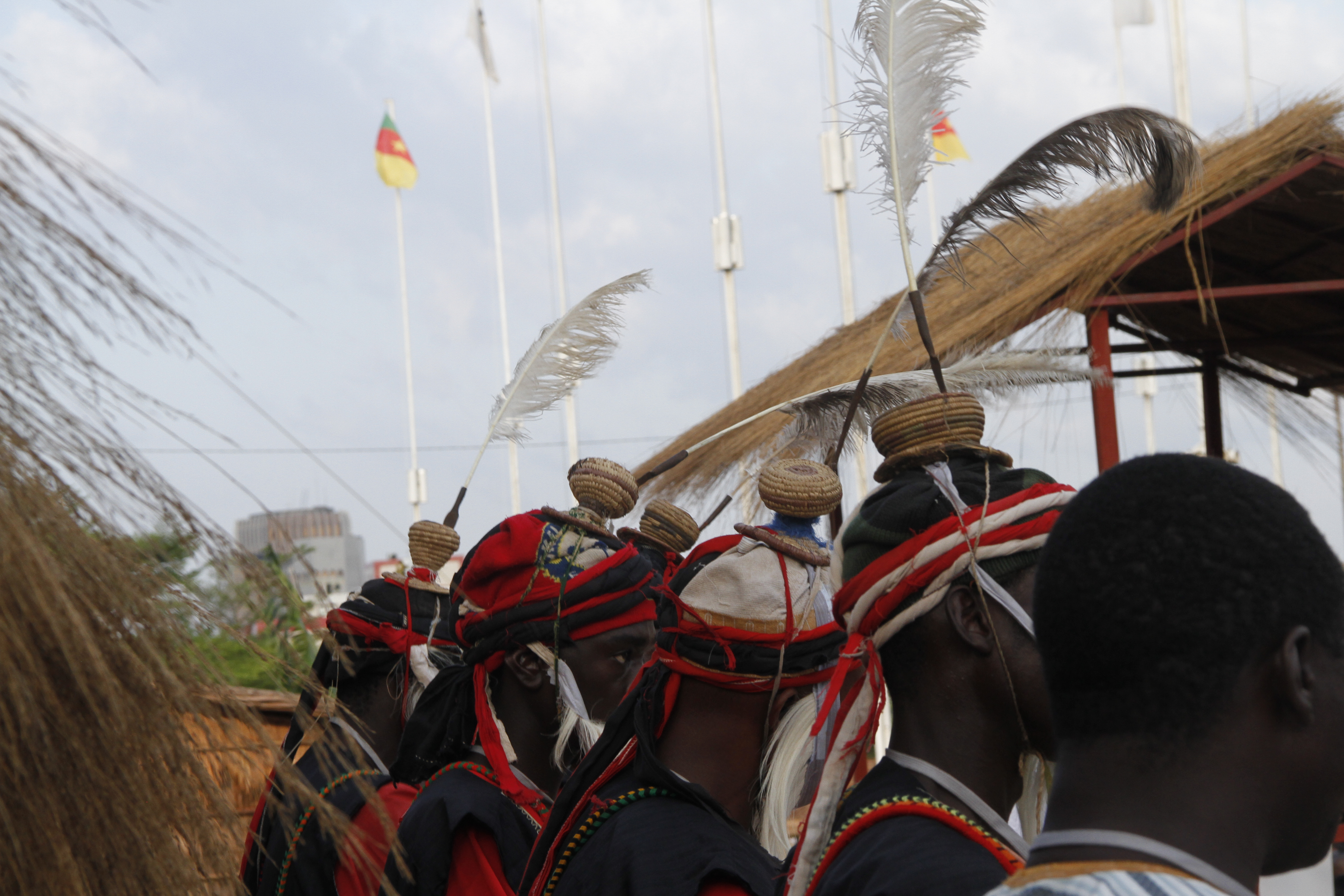

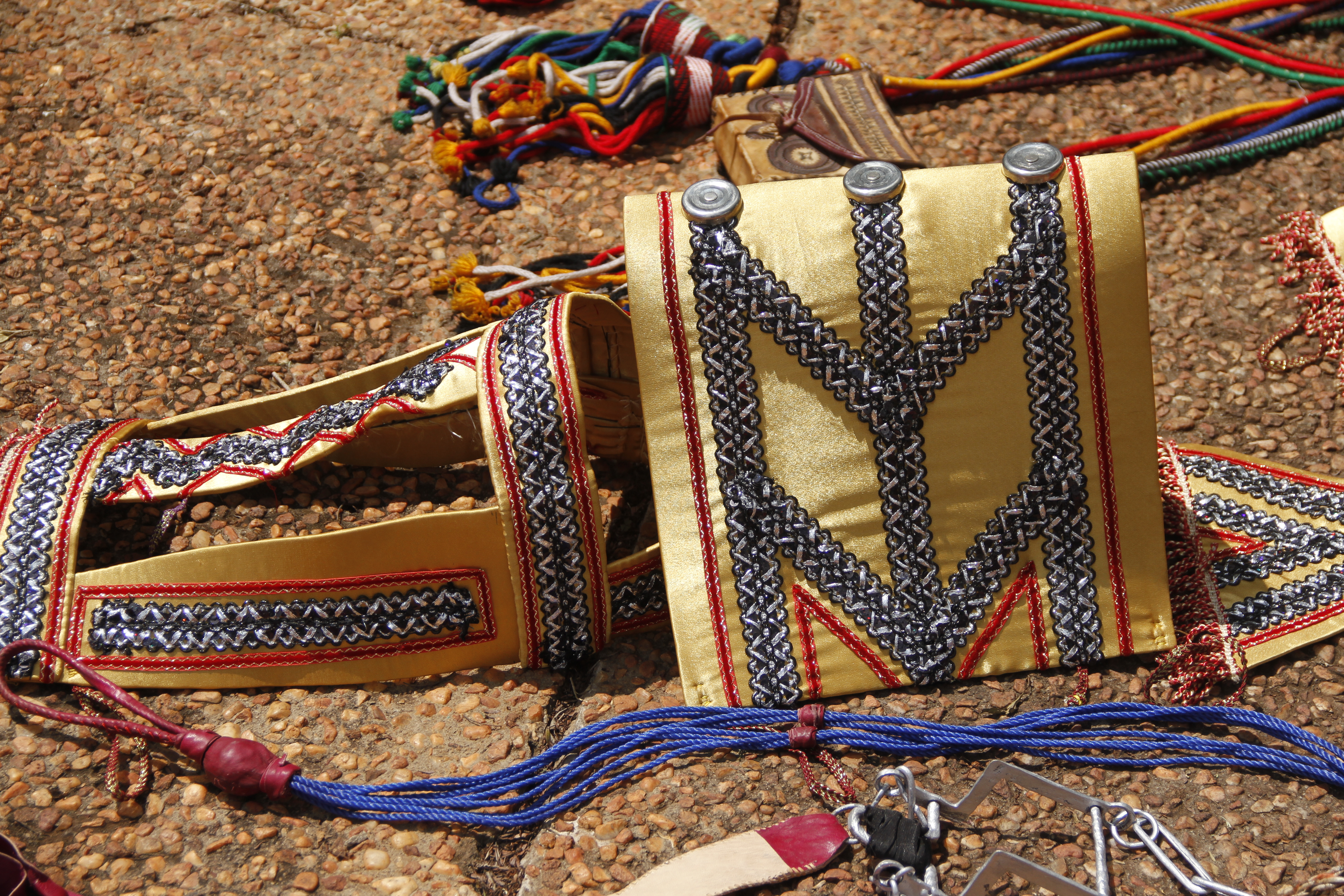

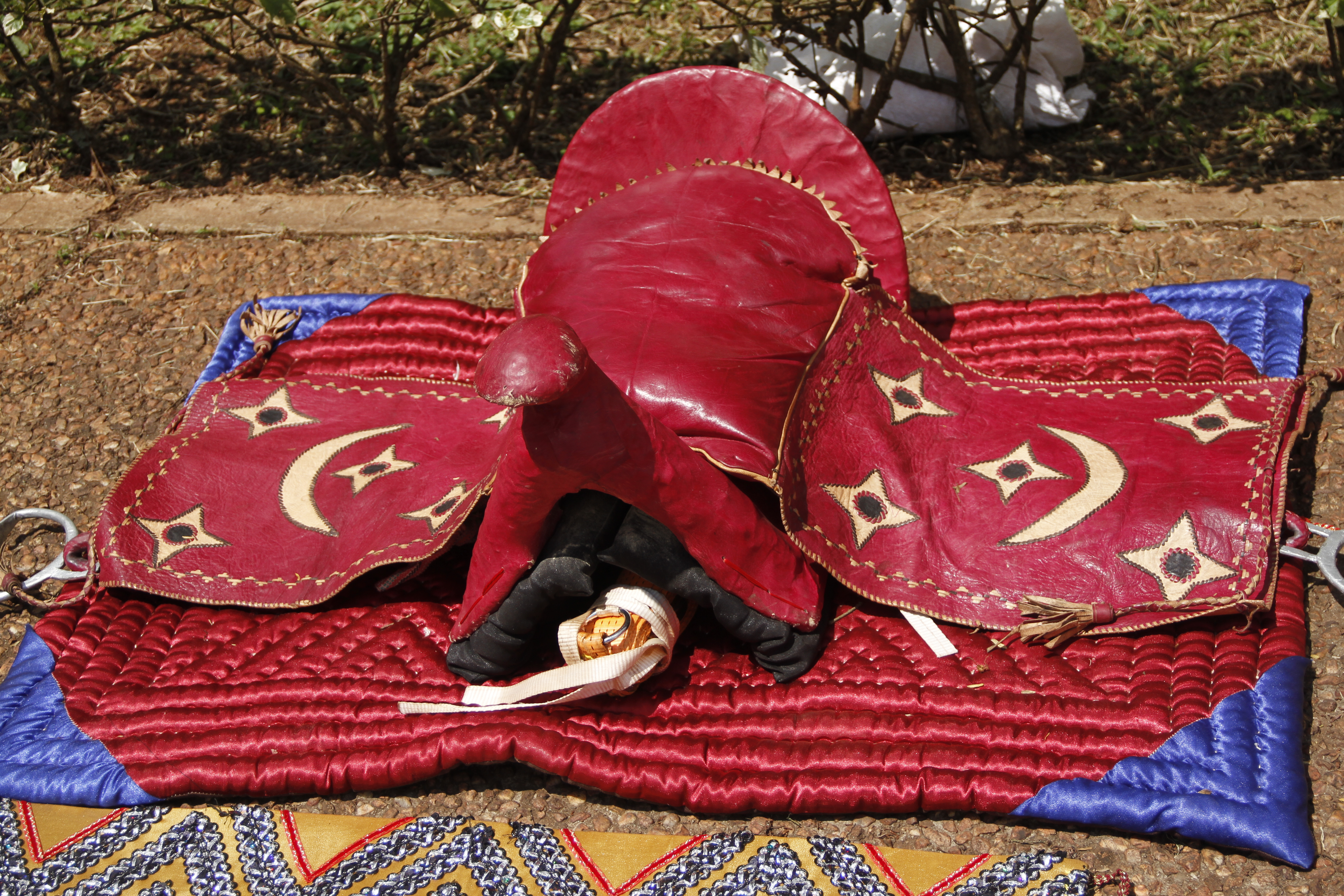

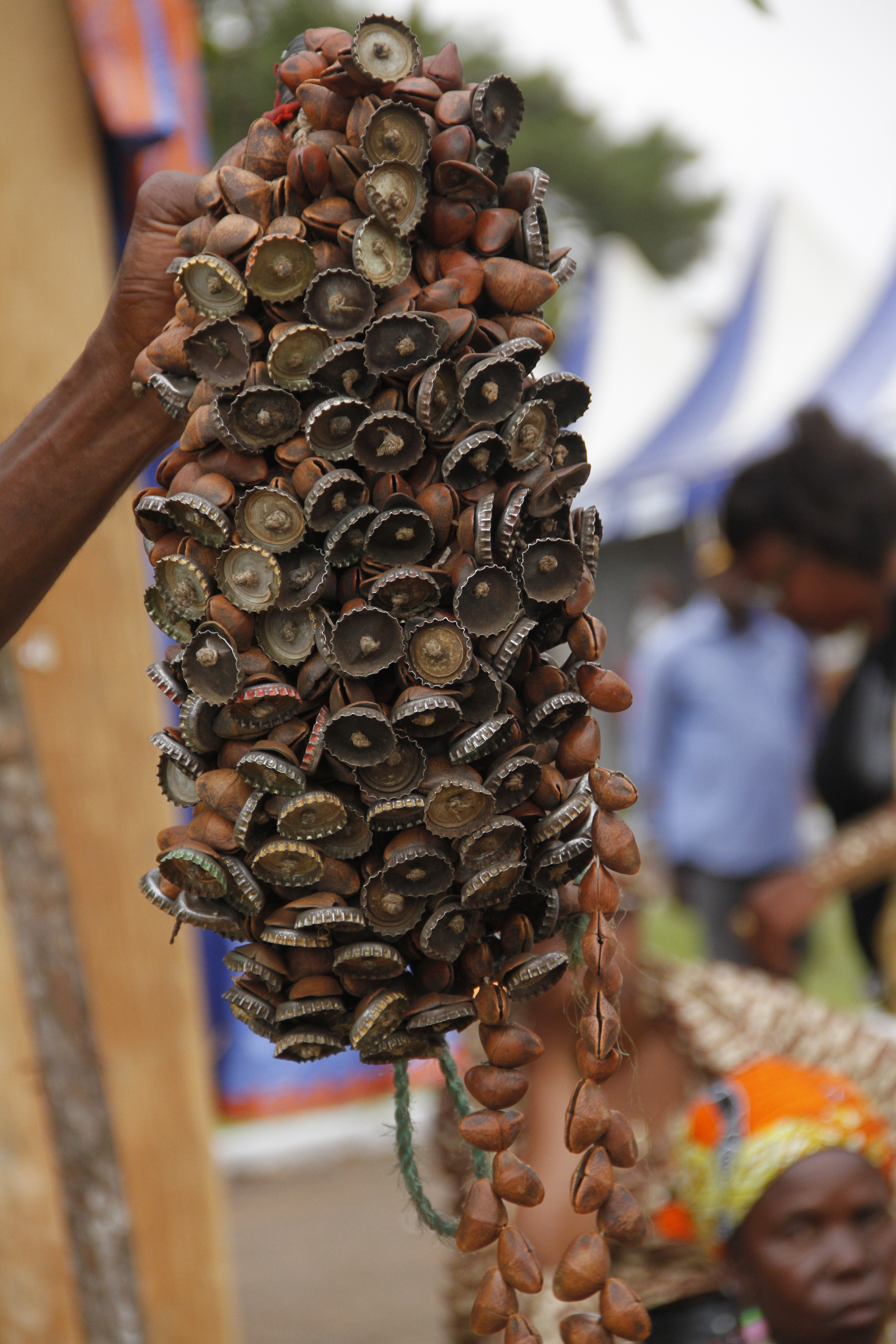

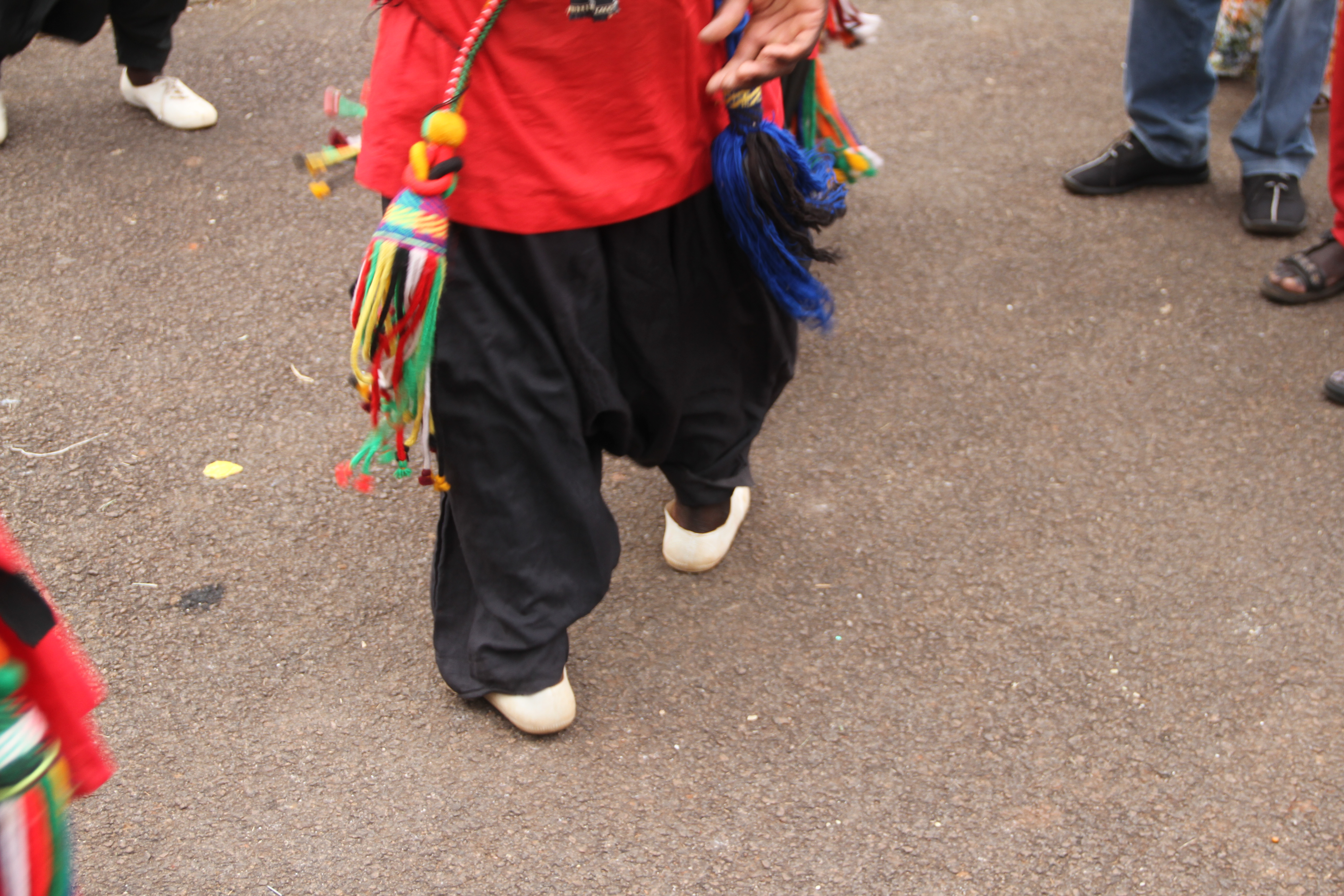

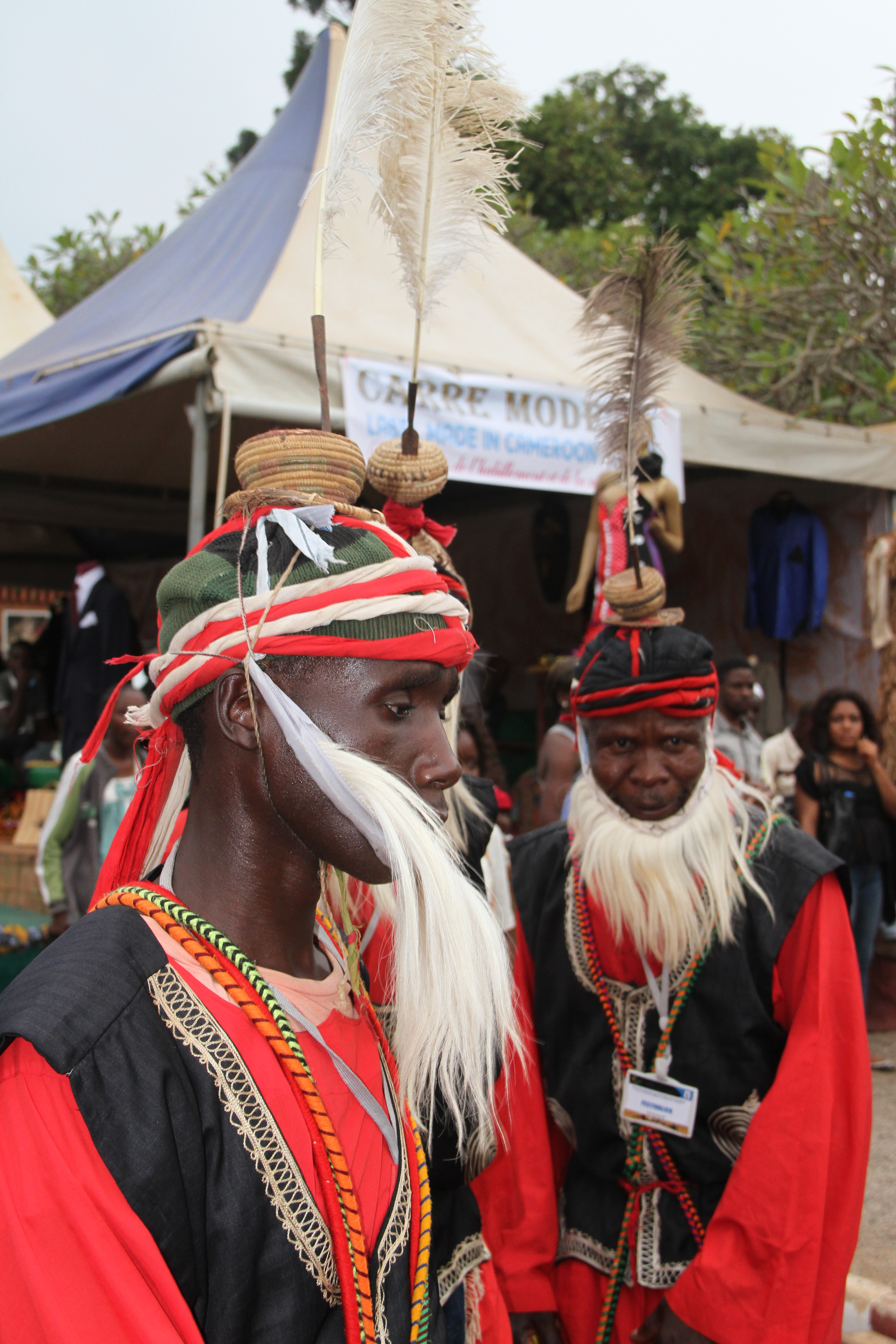

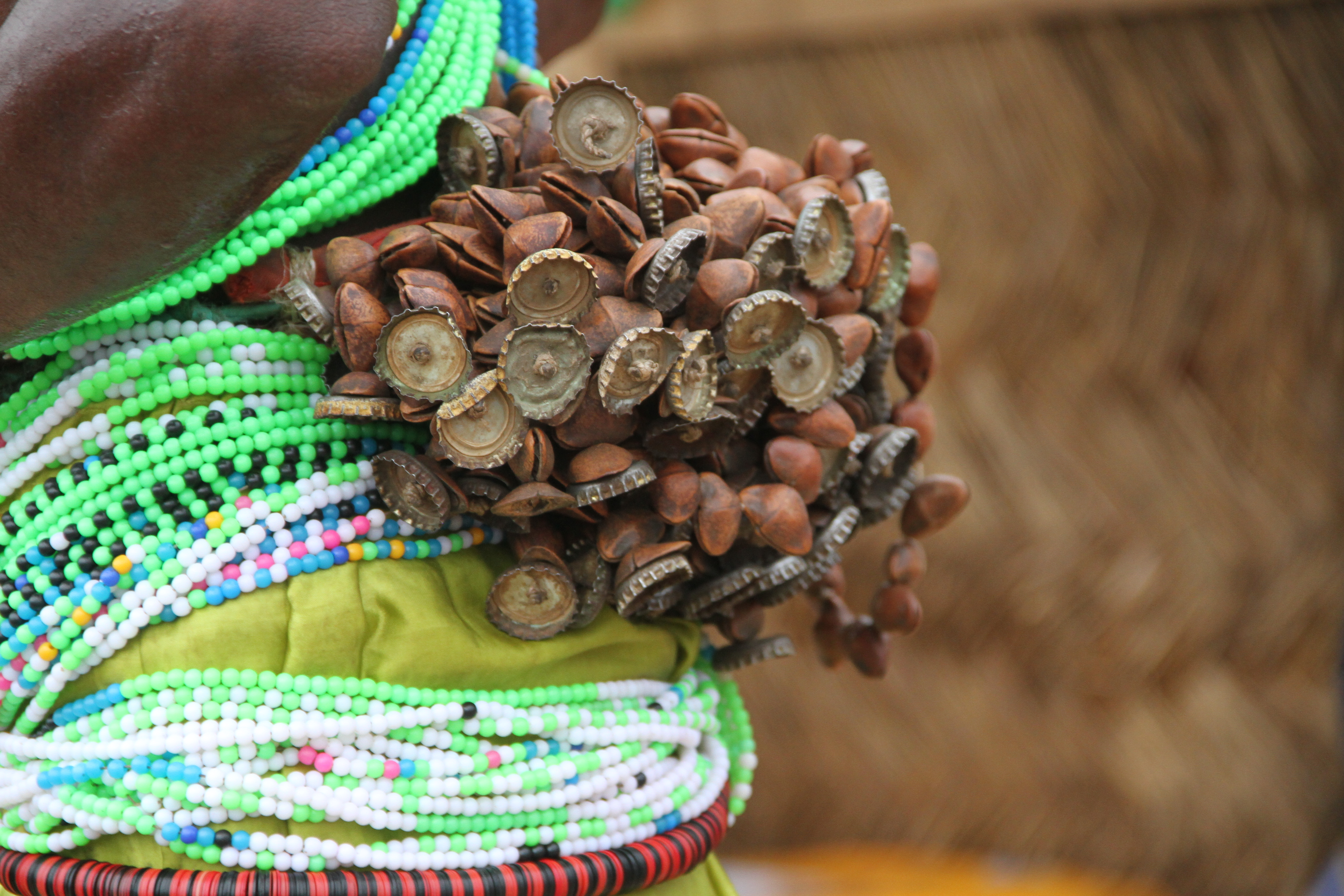

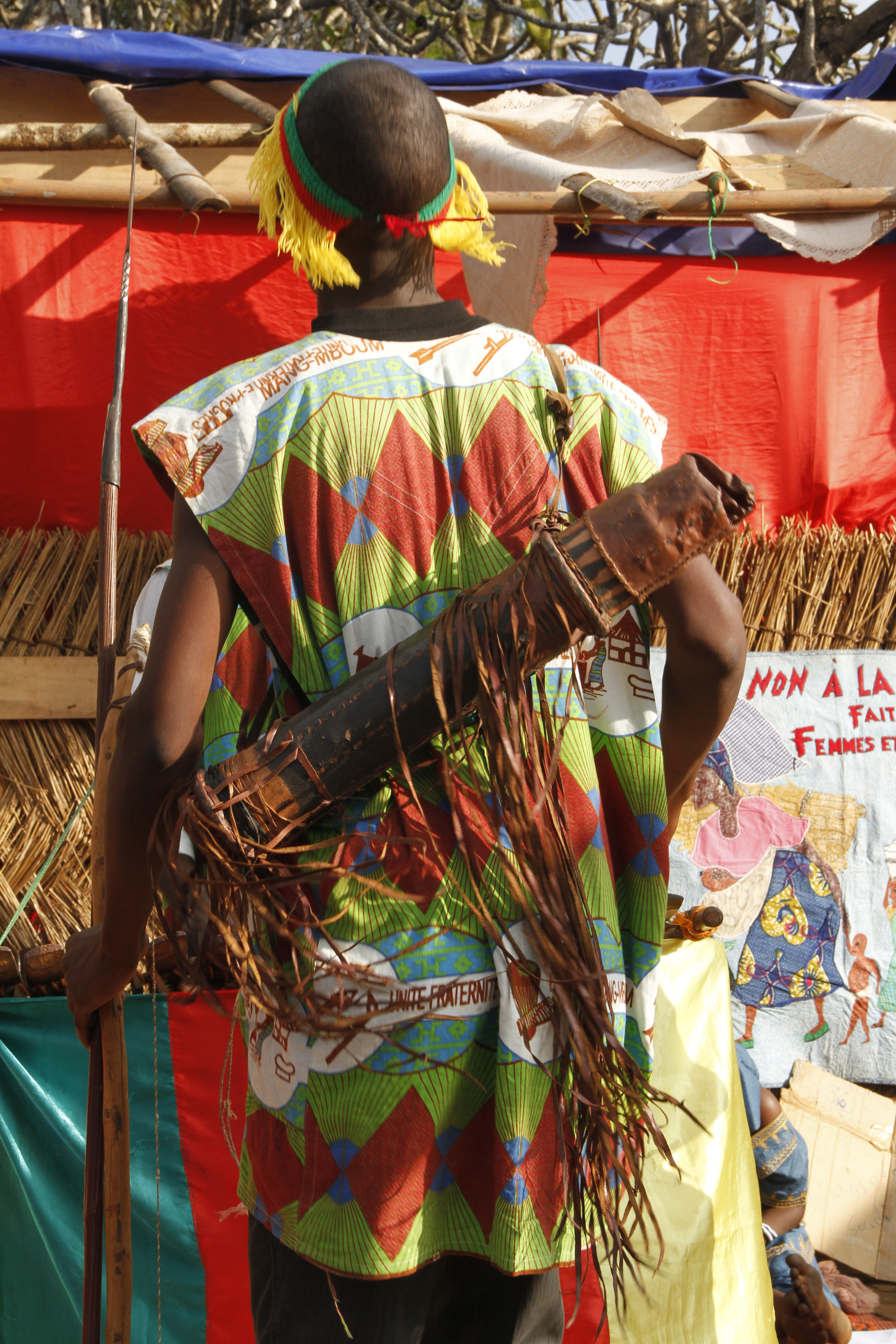

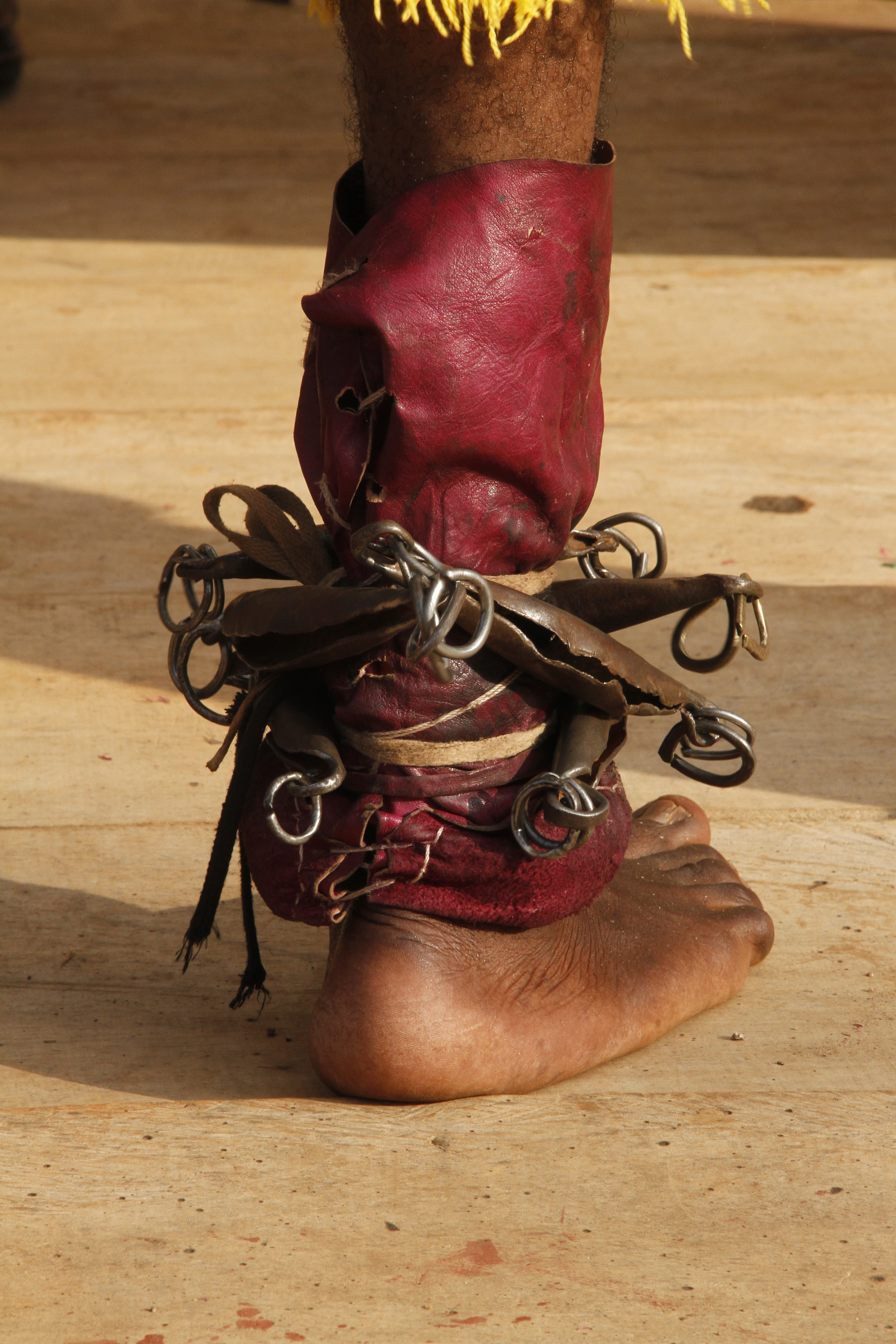

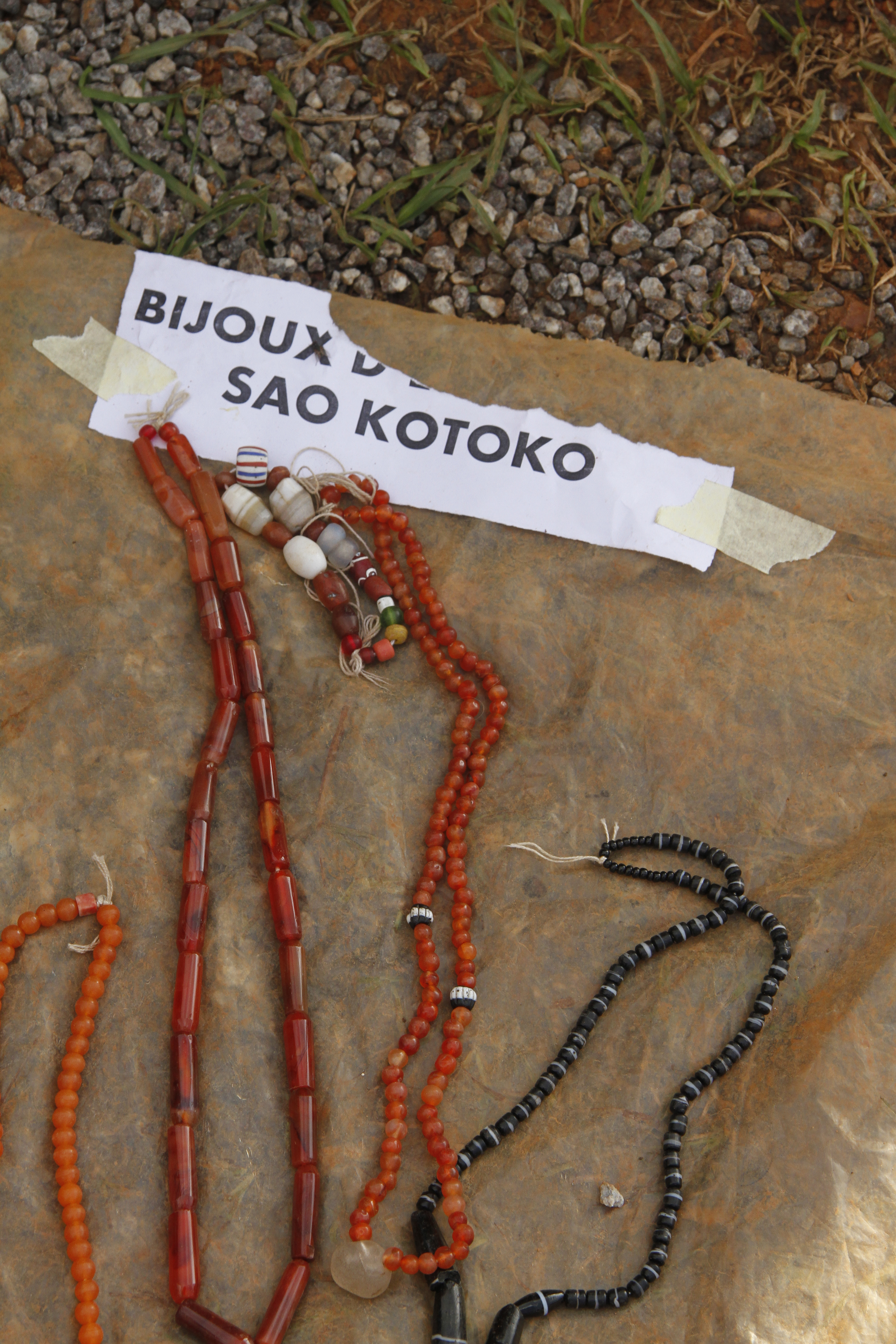

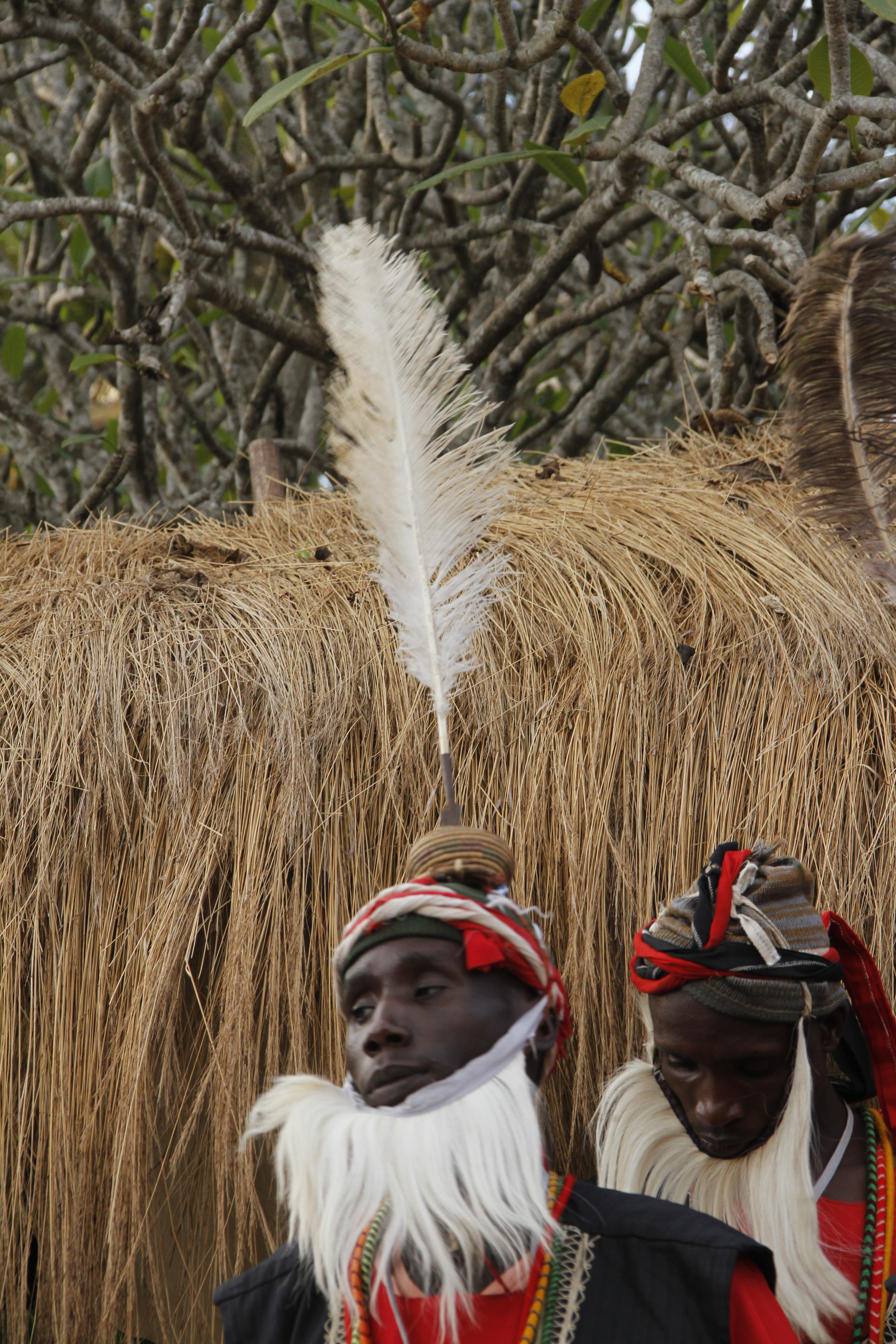
Traditional musical instruments

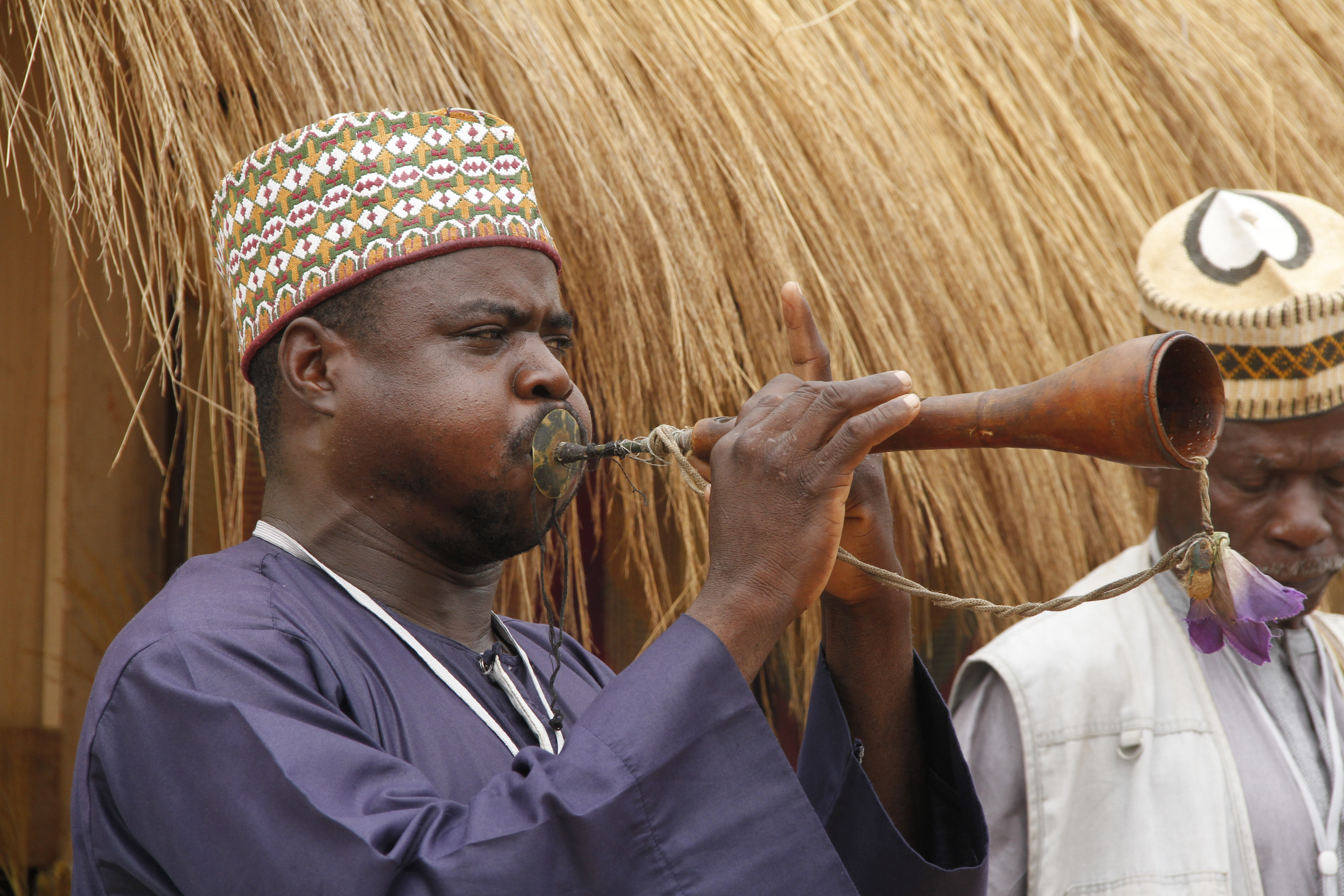

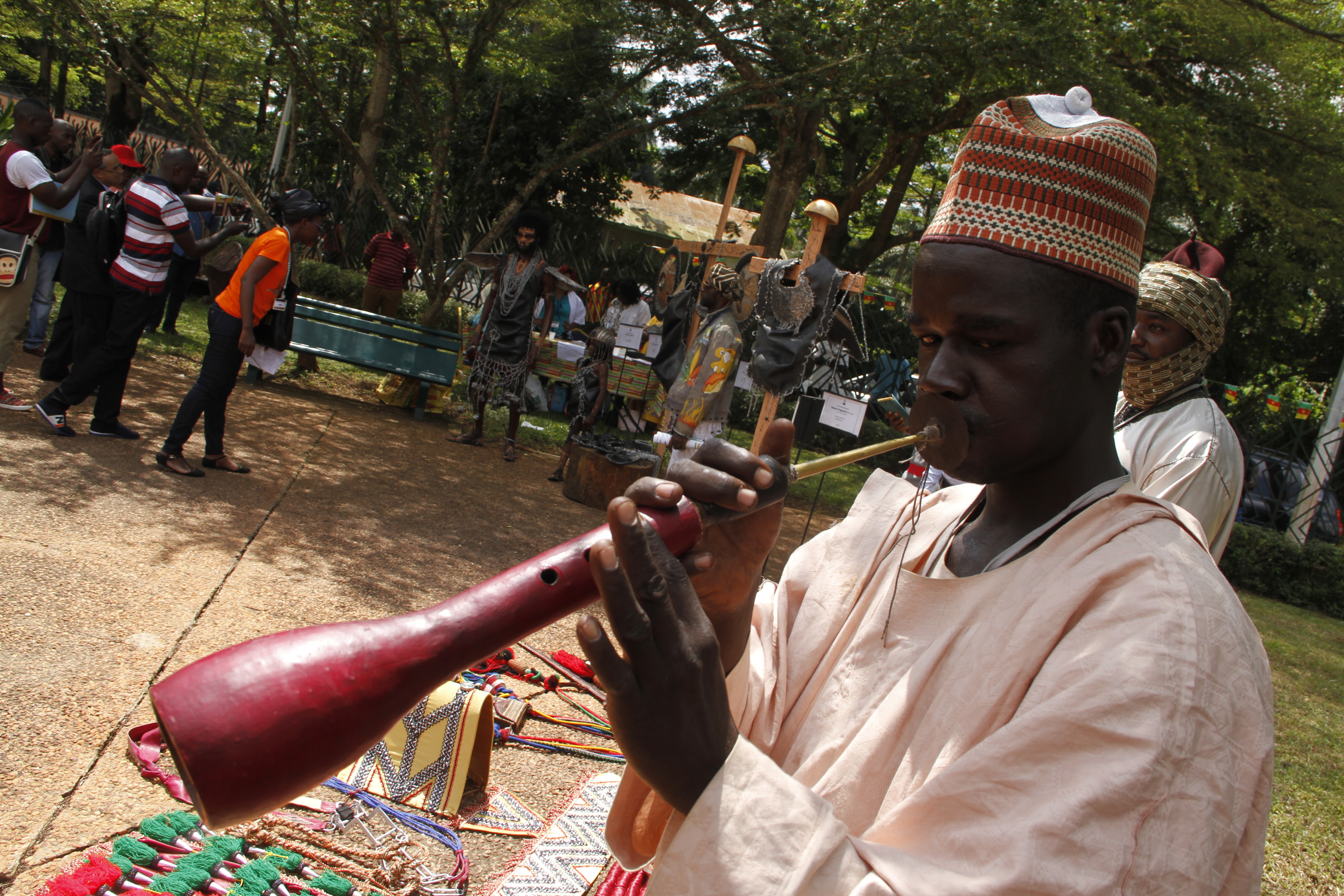

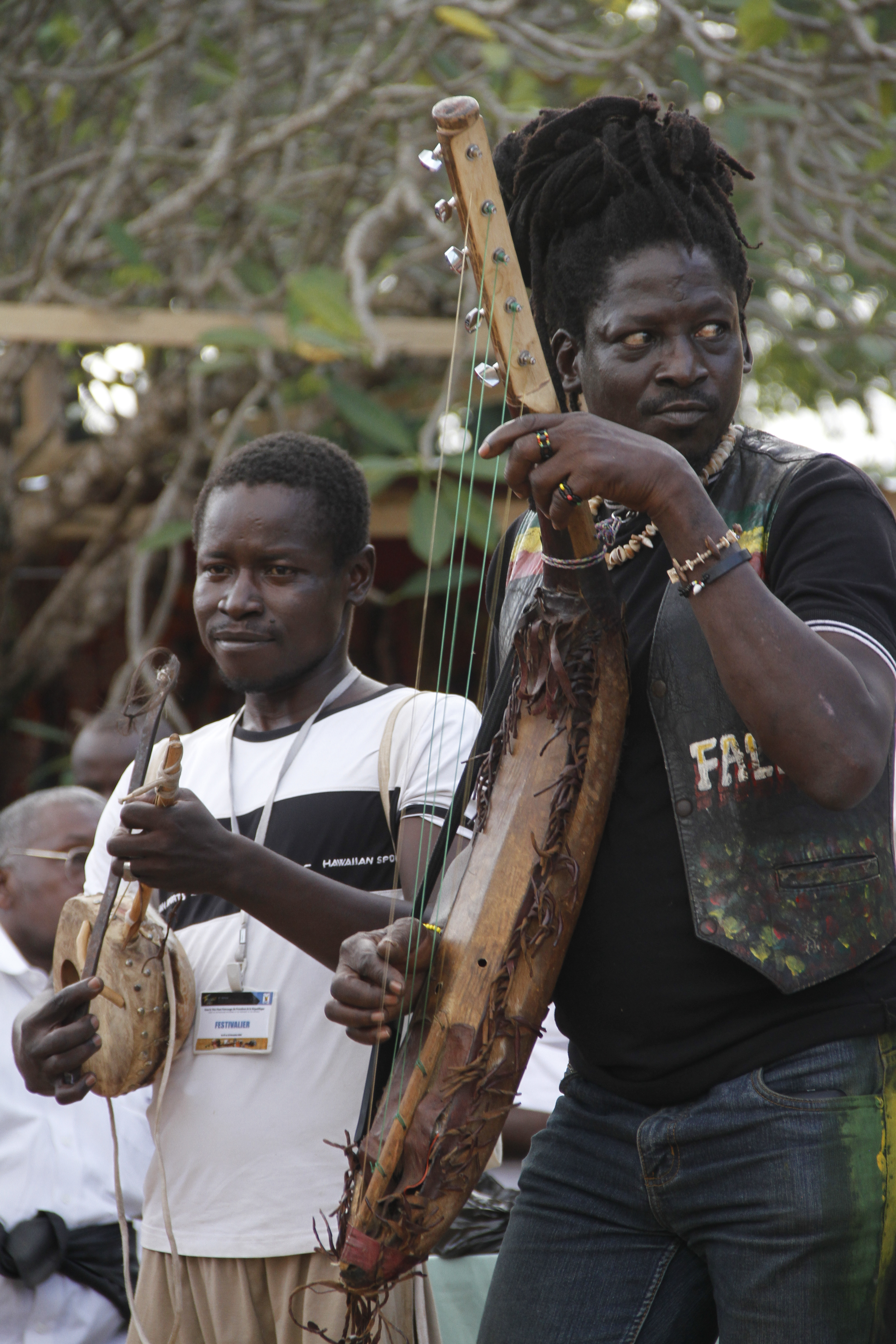

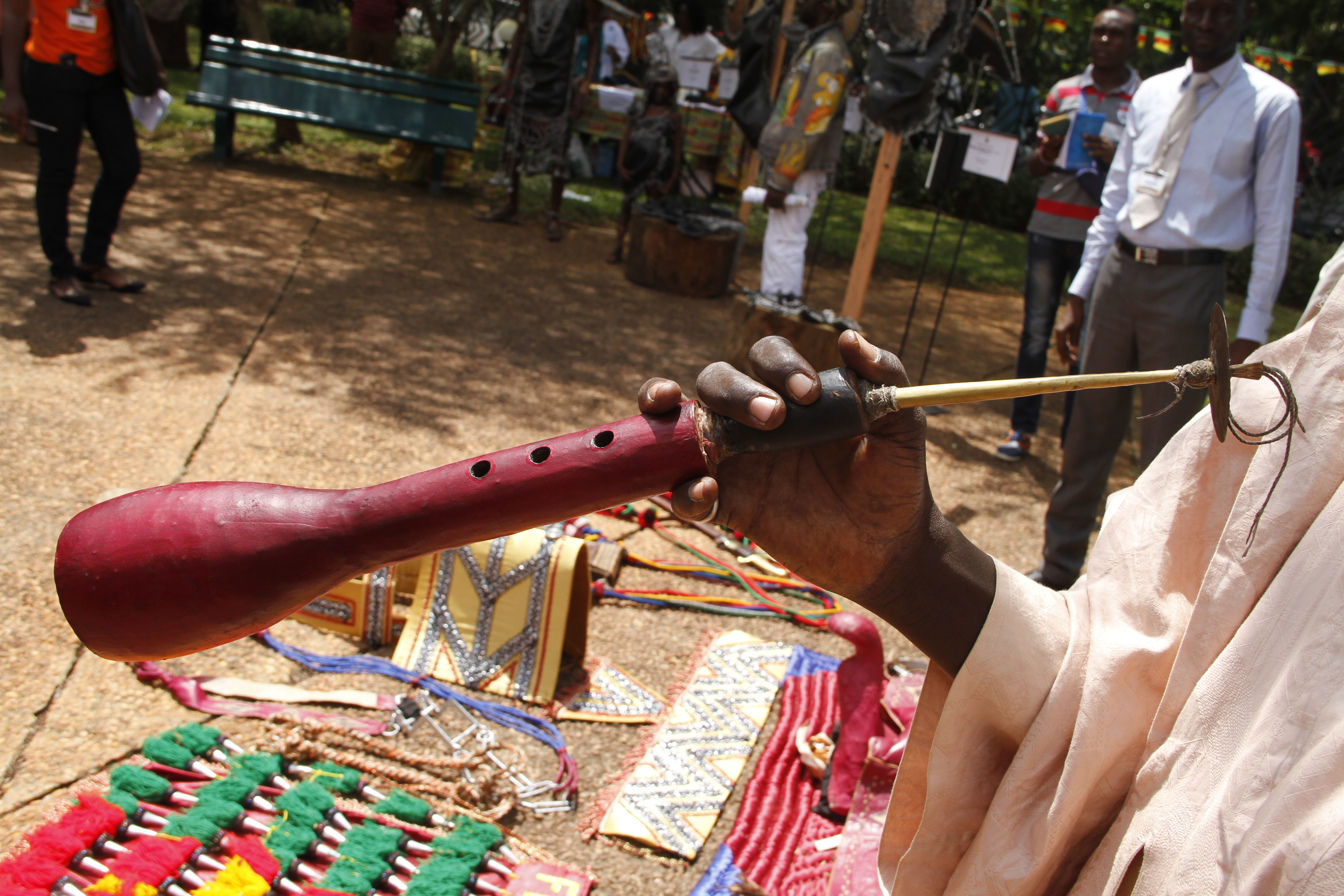

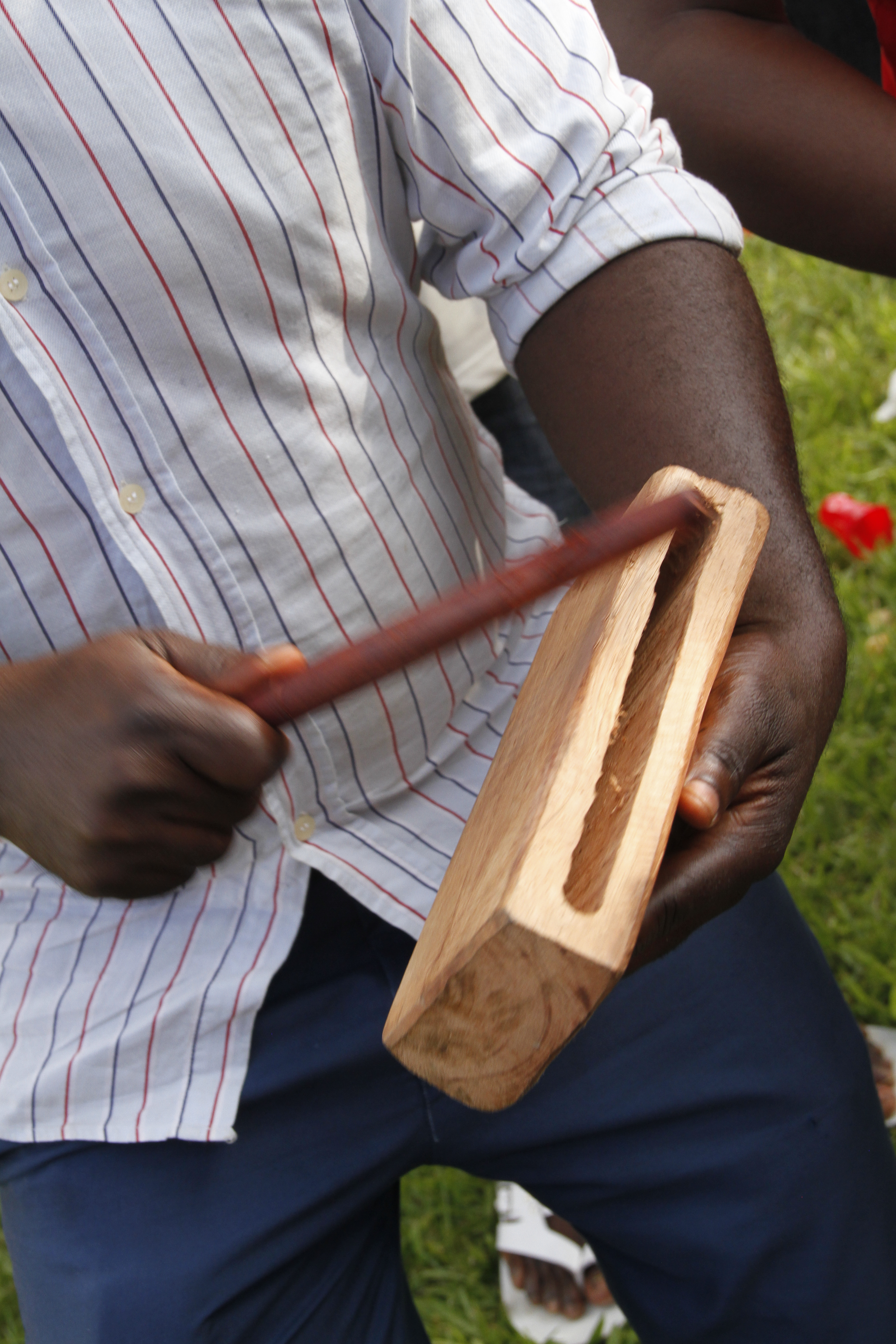

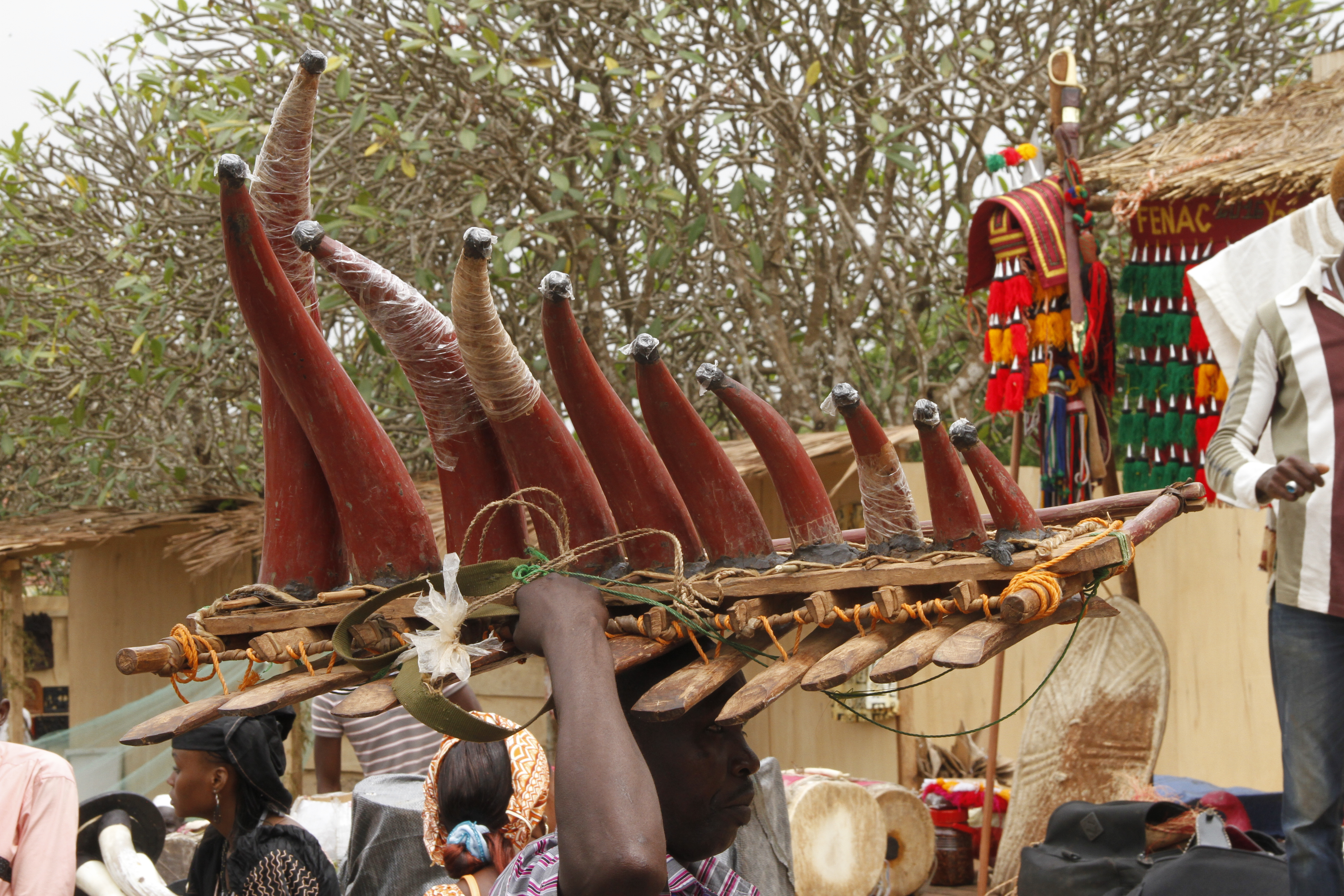

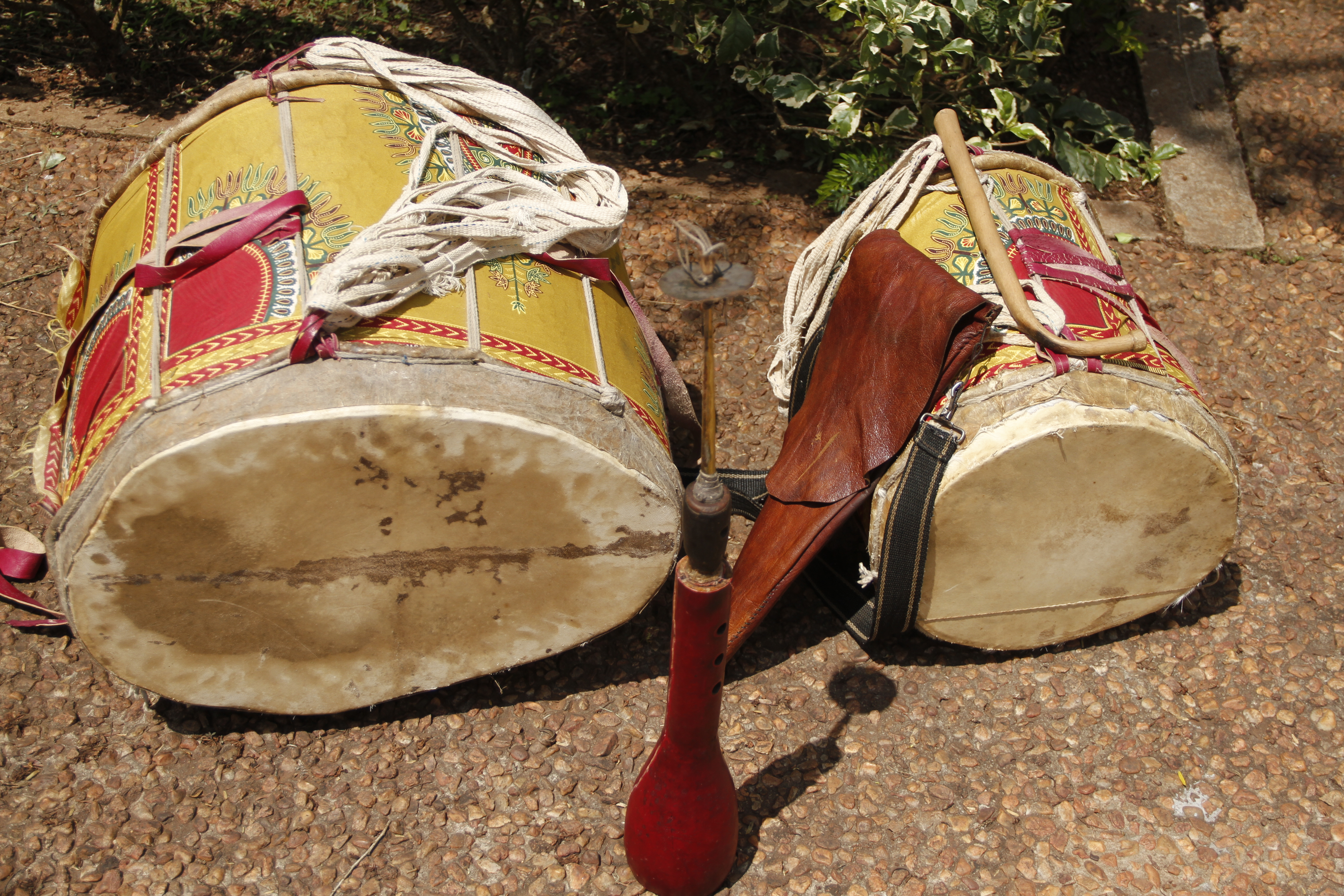

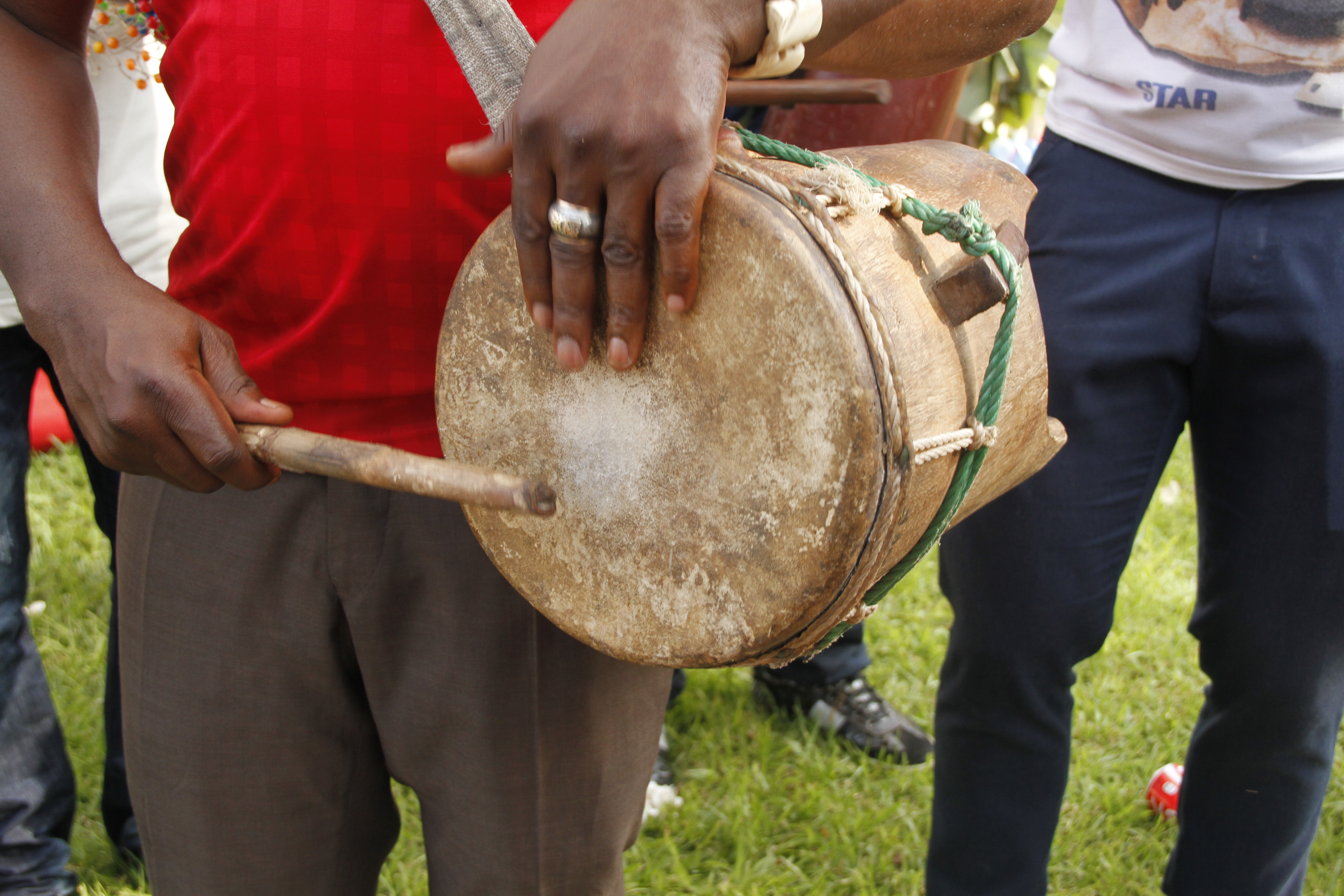

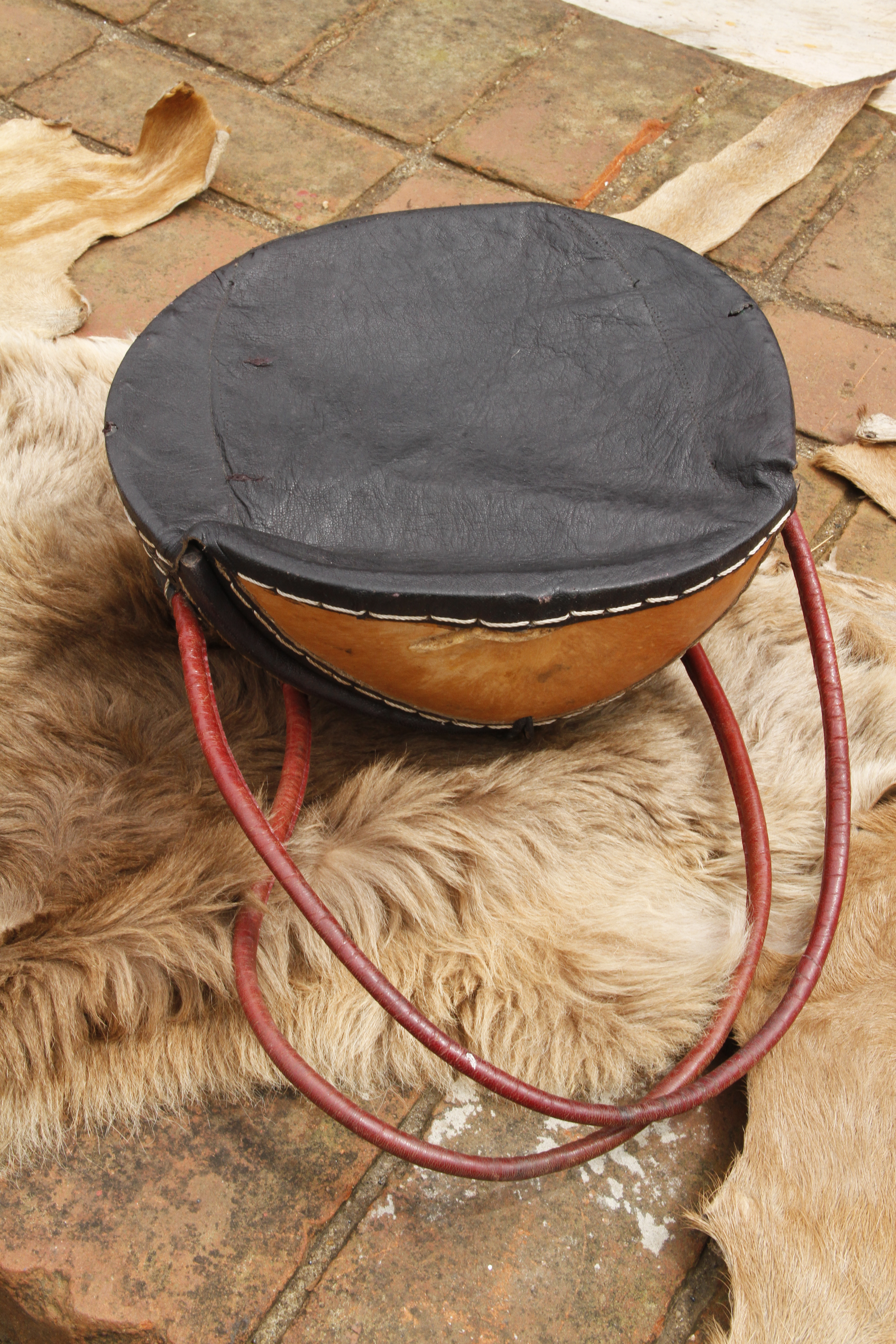

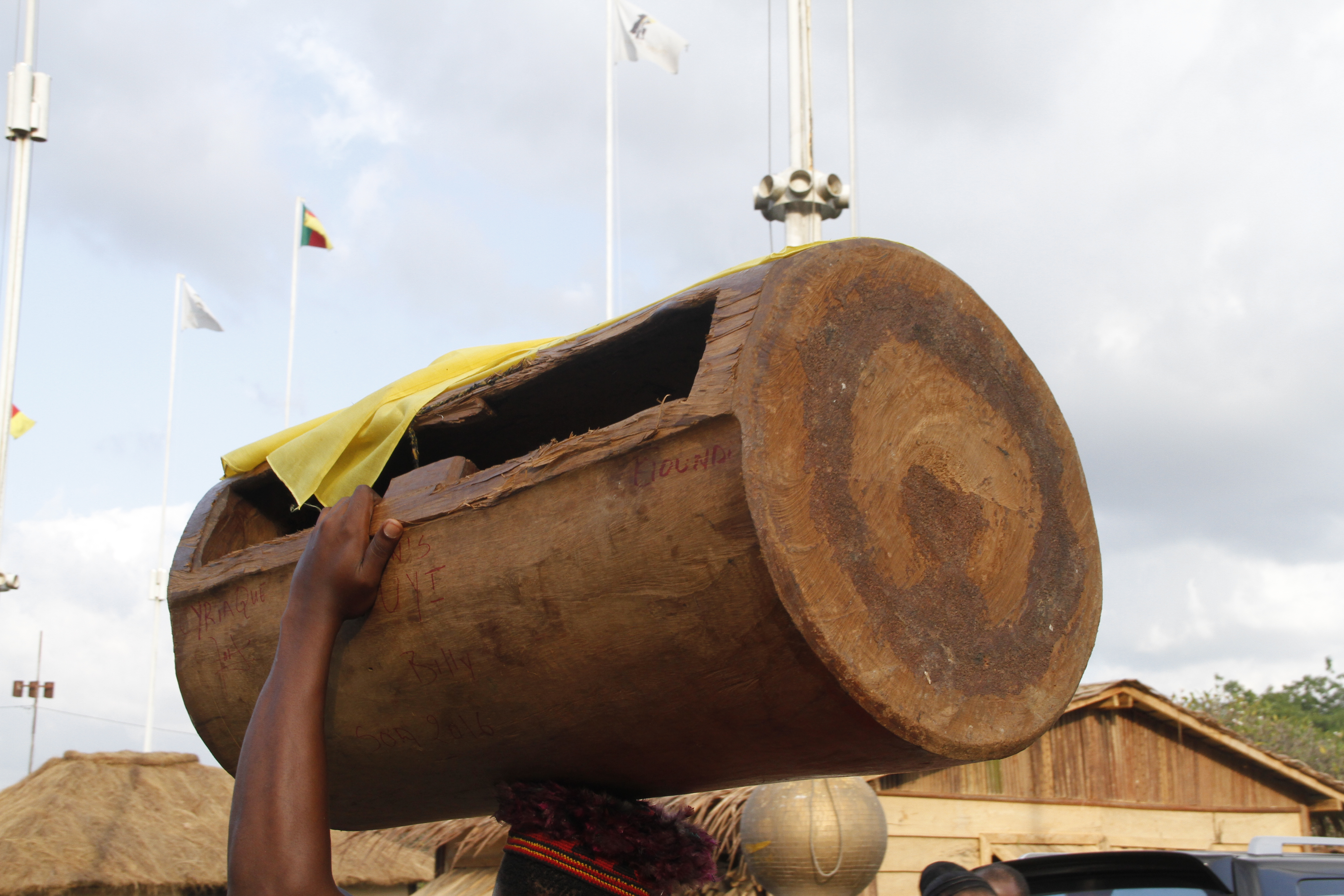

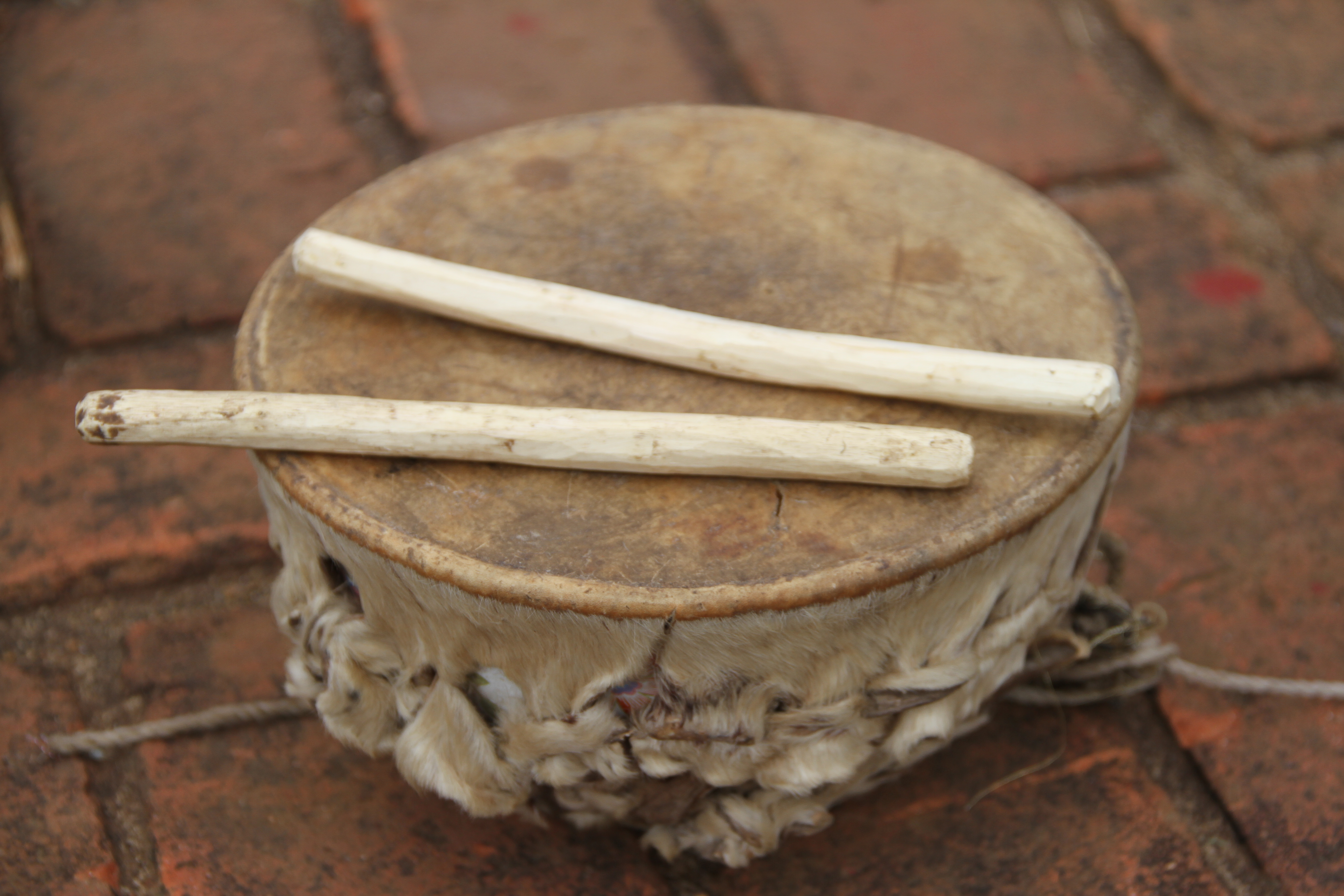
Tam-tam

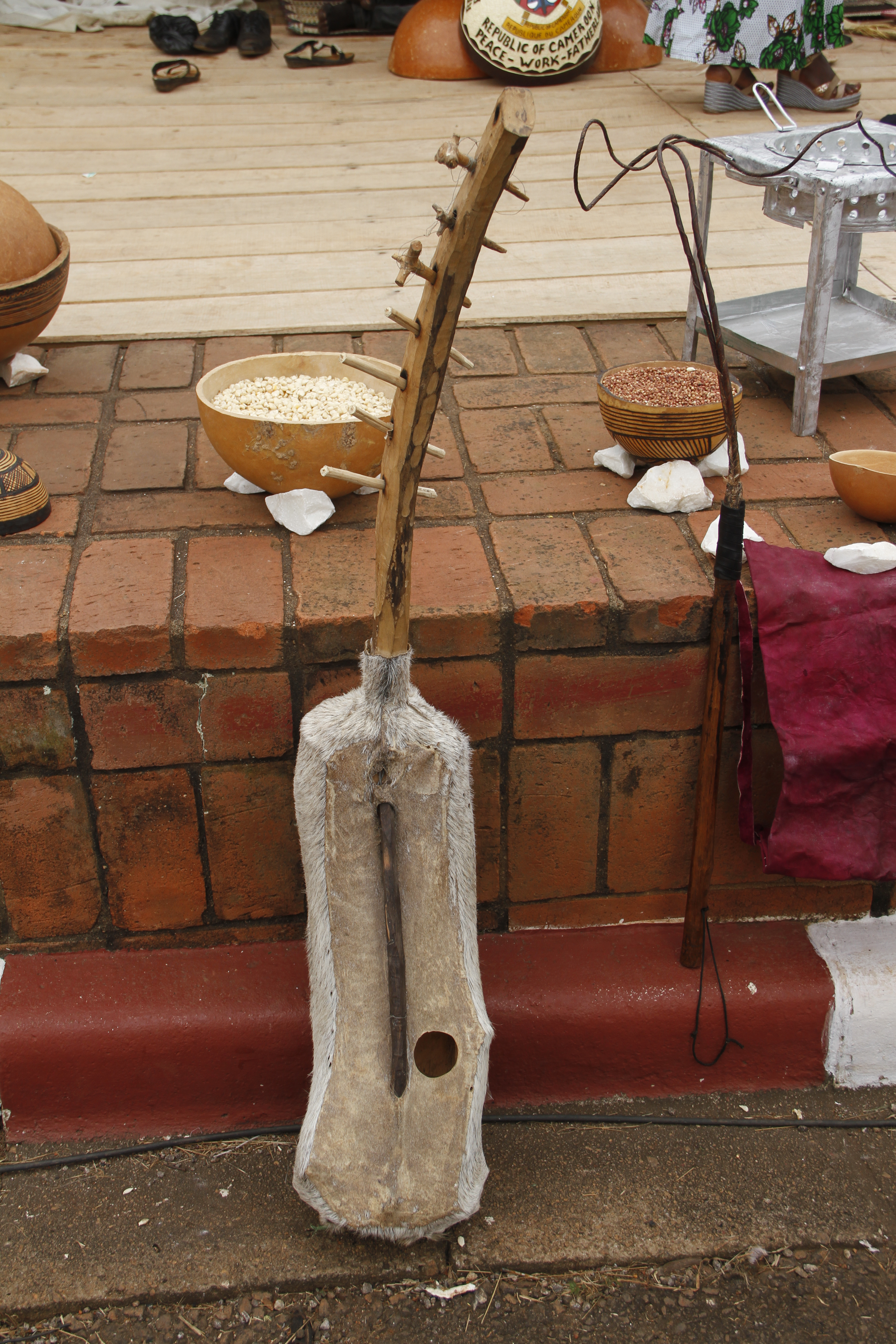
Guitar

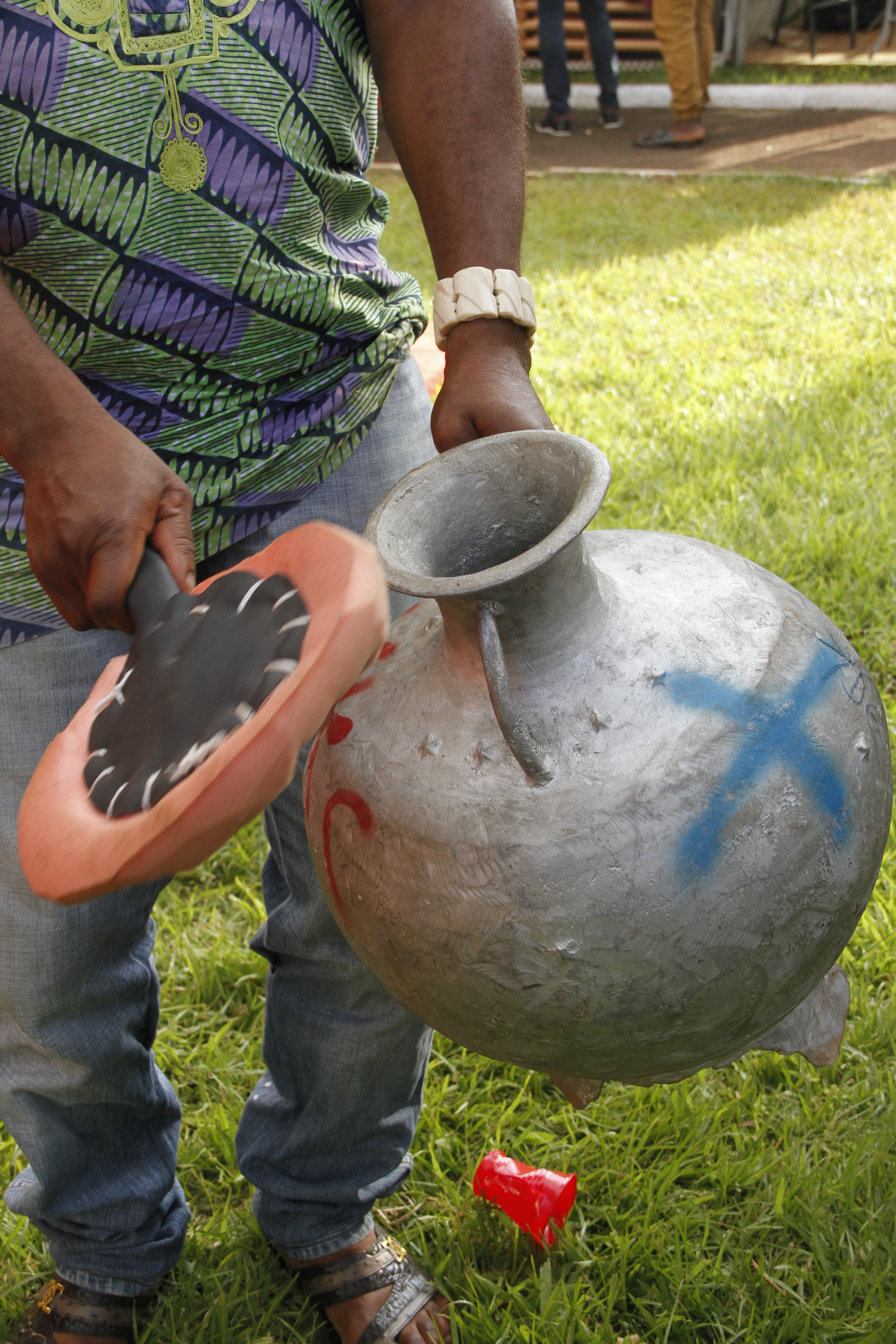

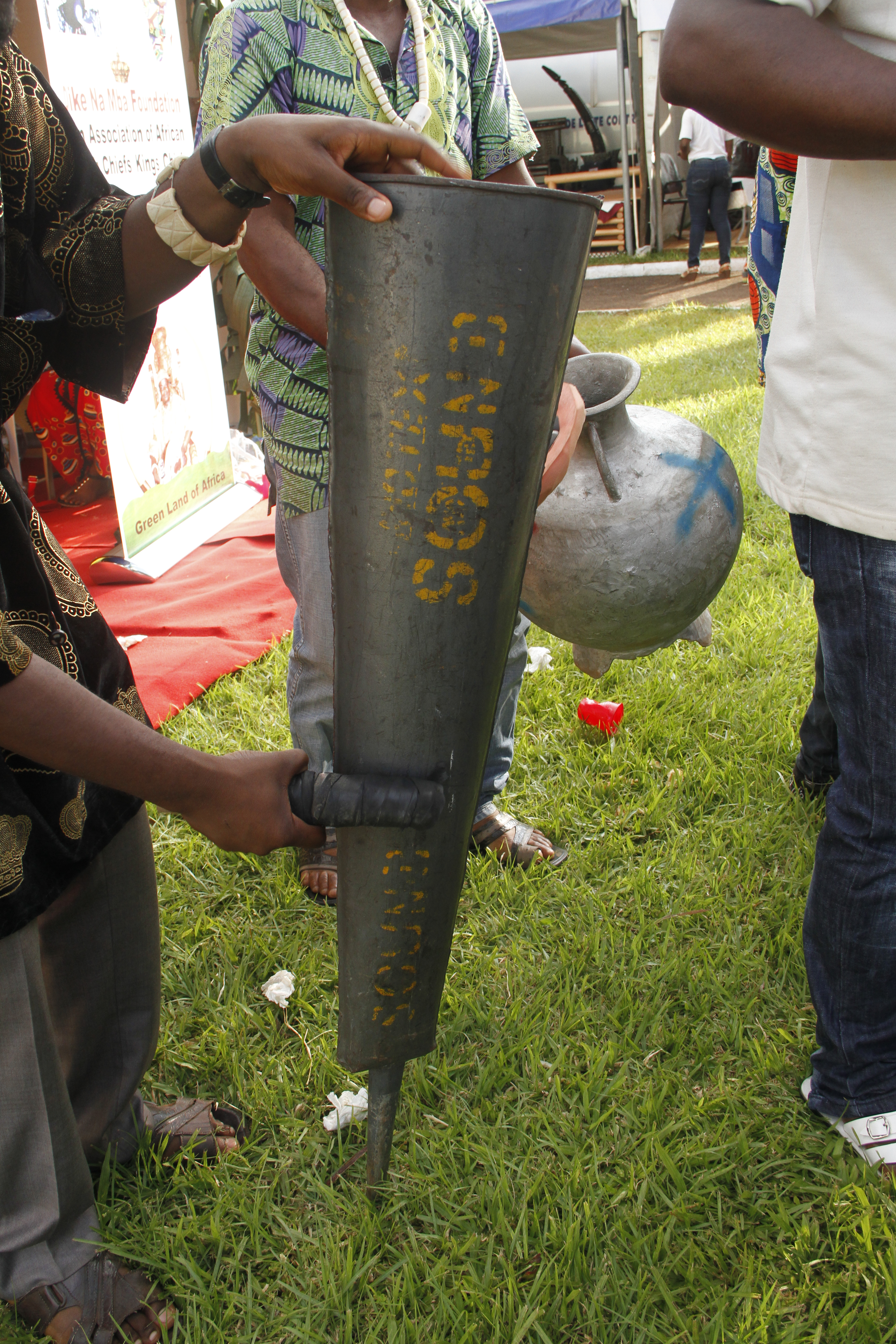

Hair styles and head coverings

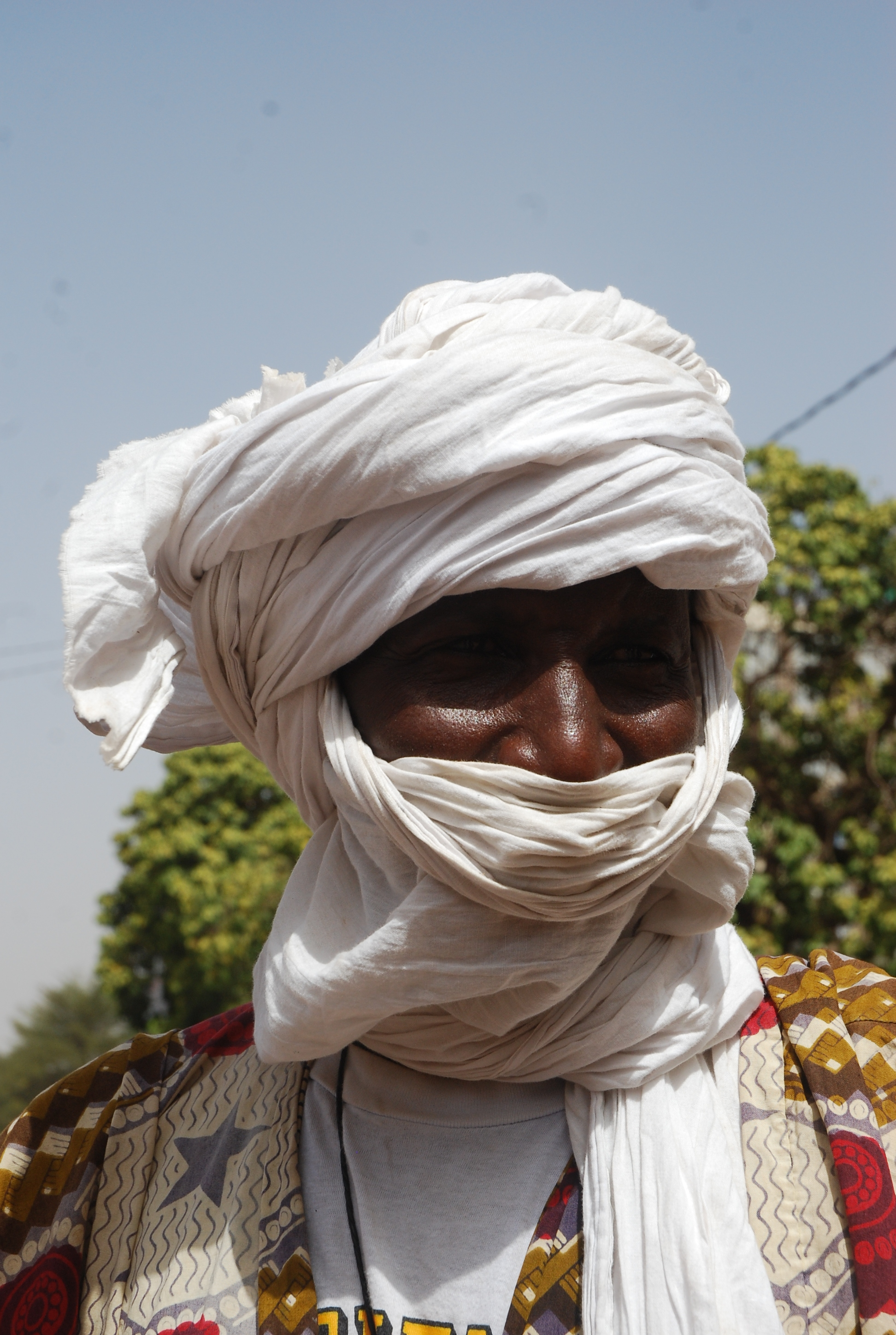

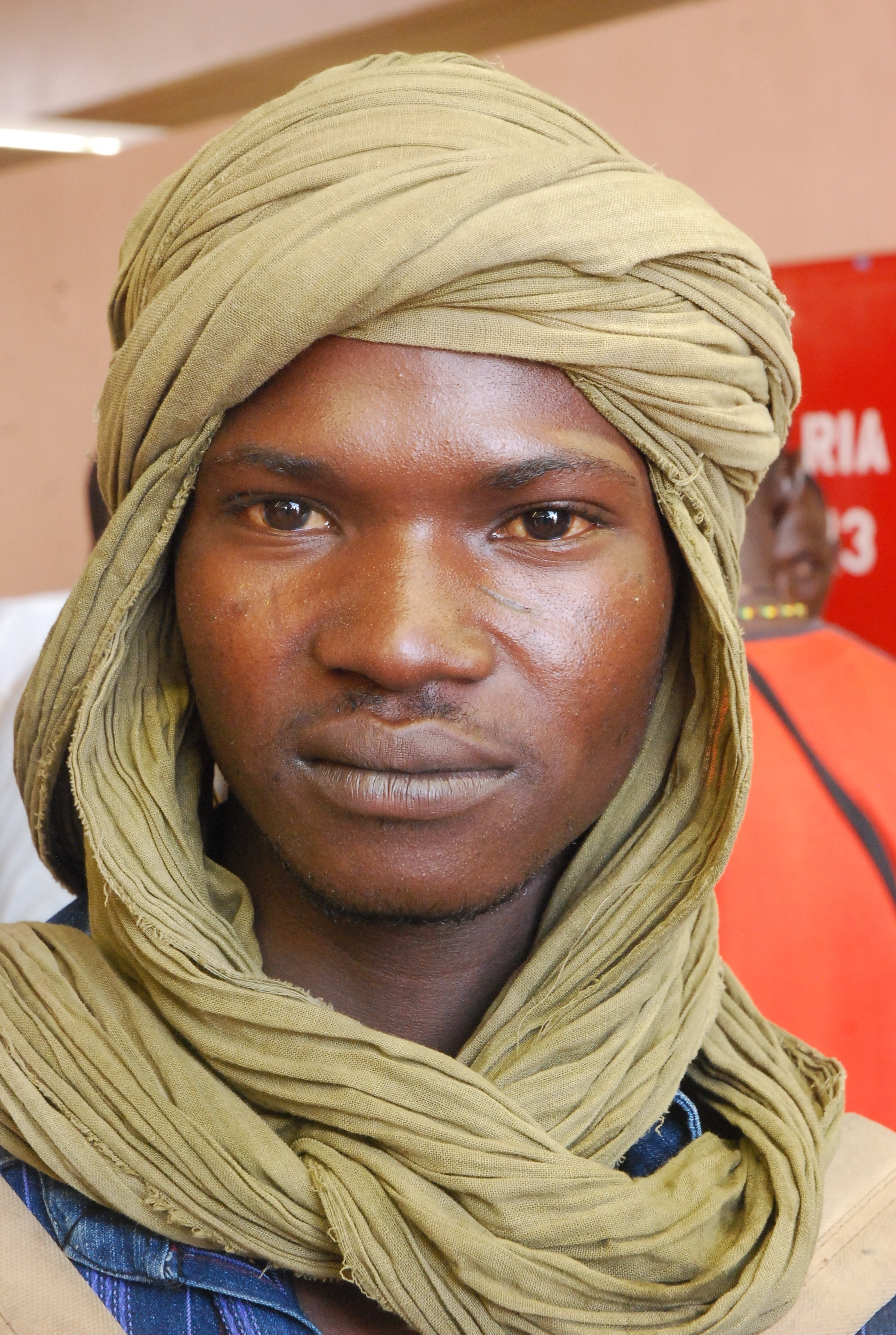

== History ==
=== Early population movements ===
The flood plains of the Bénoué Depression have long attracted human settlement, as archaeological finds in the area and in Garoua attest. The Paleo-Sudanese, such as the Guider, represent the region's oldest continuous inhabitants. These peoples inhabited the region well before the 8th century. By the 9th century, various Neo-Sudanese groups migrated into the territory, among them the Chamba, Doayo, Fali, Mundang, and Mbum. The Chamba and Mbum proved the most warlike, forcing other groups to assimilate or find new homes. Over the years, the Mbum became quite cohesive, with a common language, social order, and ruler.

The Bata entered the area in two main waves. The first settled along the valley of the Bénoué River (River Benue), then the second continued south to Demsa Pwa (old Demsa). During this migration, the Bata fought and absorbed other peoples whom they met. The Bata also settled the site of Garoua (along with the Fali) in the 18th century. Other groups fled the Bata and settle elsewhere, such as the Chamba, Mbum, and Vere. The Chamba continued to migrate (due partially to internal squabbling) well into the colonial period, and they founded many settlements along the way, including Donga, Suntai, and Tissa.

Some of Cameroon's other peoples lived in the territory of the North Province at one time or another. The Bali of the Northwest Province descend from the Chamba, for example. The Tikar of the Adamawa and Northwest Provinces probably migrated to their present location from the Bénoué Depression.

=== Kanem-Bornu period ===
The territory fell to the control of the Islamic Kanem Empire under Sultan (or Mai) Dunama (Dunam) II (r. 1221–1259). Thousands of cavalry subdued the area (known as Mabina) during this period. Under Kanem control, a governor presided over Mabina from the Kanem capital. The area was also nominally under the control of the kaigama, the Kanem military commander and ward of its southern provinces.

Kanem control did not last long. Civil war erupted upon Dunama's death, as a succession of warlords occupied the territory in an ever-shifting succession of power. The old empire was not reunited until the reign of Ali Ghaji, who came to power in 1472 and set his capital at Bornu.

Slavery and Islam are the two most enduring legacies of the Kanem-Bornu period. Slaves proved a lucrative commodity, and large numbers of them were transported from the area across the Sahara. Kanem-Bornu control brought Islam to the region between 1349 and 1385, though only a handful of elites or rulers ever converted.

=== Fulbe jihads ===
Beginning in the 13th century, small numbers of Fulbe herdsmen and settlers began streaming into the territory from present-day Nigeria. Over time, Fulbe numbers grew, and the immigrants began to shift from subservience to other ethnic groups to settling Fulbe-only settlements. They also embraced Islam beginning in the 17th century. By 1804, Fulbe numbers had reached the point where the herders had to seek new pastureland and the settlers tired of paying homage to non-Fulbe rulers. The sentiment reached its peak when Fulbe mystic Usman Dan Fodio declared a jihad in what is today northern Nigeria and Cameroon. Modibo Adama became lamido of Fumbina, charged with conquering the territory for Usman's Sokoto Empire.

In areas with sizable Fulbe populations, Adama's task proved fairly simple. The settlements at Bundang, Chamba, Chebowa, Deo, Faro, Garoua, Guringa, Kilba, Malaba, Rai, Song, Turua, and Zummo fell easily, Garoua in 1813. In other areas, Adama met with staunch resistance. He first struck at the Bata of Pema, Tepa, and Turuwa. Fulbe raiders enslaved Bata resisters in great numbers, and those Bata who could fled south to found Demsa Mosu (new Demsa) and Bata Batchama to the north. Those peoples who were unwilling to submit to Fulbe supremacy were forced to flee, many of them to the forbidding Mandara and Atlantika Mountains.

Adama allied with forces from Kanem-Bornu to pursue the Mandara people. He led the charge to conquer Guider by 1810, then he moved on the Mandara capital of Douolo. Adama took these settlements and other smaller ones. The remainder of the Mandaras fled to the mountains that today bear their name. Adama had reached well into the Adamawa Plateau by 1825.

Upon Adama's death in 1847, almost all of northern Cameroon was under the rule of various Fulbe lamidos of the Sokoto Empire. What is today the North Province fell into the Garoua-Gurin and Song-Guider districts. The centralised administration (headed from Yola in present-day Nigeria) aided communication and trade throughout the region. Slaves formed a large portion of the economy, and were traded for horses and salt. In addition, the jihads cemented Islam as the dominant religion in the area.

Non-Fulbe peoples were forced to either submit to Fulbe control (and the rule of non-native rulers) or to continue their resistance long after Adama's death. The Fali of the Bénoué Depression led the Fulbe to fortify Garoua, which they called Ribadou-Garoua. Meanwhile, the new Muslim empire attracted Muslims from other areas to immigrate, and Hausa, Bornu, and Shuwa Arabs moved in the late 19th century.

=== European contacts ===
The explorer Dr. Heinrich Barth, a German under British patronage, visited Garoua in 1851 as a guest of the emir at Yola. Dr. Gustav Nachtigal, another German, led a later expedition in 1869. Nachtigal became a guest of the sultan of Bornu, and with his permission penetrated the area south to the Adamawa Plateau, where he remained until 1873. Nachtigal took careful note of the region's various peoples, their relations with one another, and those goods or produce that might prove attractive to German interests.

Germany followed up on Nachtigal's findings by sending two Englishmen, J. H. Ashcroft and Edward E. Flegel, and a missionary named Hutchinson in 1879. The trio reached Garoua on 4 September and began the exploration of the upper Bénoué River. Flegel led a second expedition in 1882, travelling far and wide and negotiating treaties to give the Germans a monopoly on ivory in the area. He died in 1883, however, cutting the project short. Nonetheless, Germany annexed the "Kameruns" in 1884. Meanwhile, British traders set up trade in Garoua in 1890 for ivory, salt, and textiles.

=== German administration ===
Despite the new overlords, the northern territory of the Kameruns was mostly ignored; it was difficult to reach and its goods were of little priority compared to those of the southern forest zone. The only significant northern focus for the colonials was the port at Garoua. The first German administrators reached the settlement in 1901. The Germans then continued the development of Garoua as a port and a gateway from North to West Africa. In 1902, Garoua became the capital of the Ngaoundéré and Garoua administrative unit.

The Germans left much of the administration of the territory to the traditional rulers. They particularly favoured the Fulbe lamidos, and they encouraged other ethnic groups to convert to Islam and thus fall under the control of these rulers. Nevertheless, those lamidos and other rulers who showed too much independence or disregard for German supremacy were ousted or killed.

During World War I, Garoua and the surrounding territory formed a major focus of the British African front. Under Hugh Cunliffe, British troops attacked Garoua on 30 August 1914, but were repulsed. Cunliffe retreated to Yola (at this time also German territory). The Germans counterattacked, leaving Garoua defenseless. Cunliffe took the city and used it as a staging area for further gains against the Germans. After the German surrender of 1918, the present North Province territories fell under a League of Nations mandate, to be administered by France.

=== French administration ===
The French maintained a similar policy of governing the area through the Fulbe. Also like the Germans, recalcitrant rulers found themselves quickly deprived of their positions. Missionaries also entered the region, such as the Lutheran Fraternal Mission in Garoua in 1919.

Still, the French largely ignored the area except for the Bénoué port, which they enlarged in 1930. They also introduced a hardier variety of cotton (allem) in 1931. The French orchestrated further road building in the area, including a major route from Foumban to Garoua via Ngaoundéré. In addition, Garoua received a large airport. The region fell into the Mora-Garoua division, administered from Garoua.

Under André-Marie Mbida, first premier of Cameroon after France granted it self-governance in 1956, the North's Fulbe majority rose in opposition, especially against the 1957 Abong-Mbang Resolutions. The Union Camerounaise political party with its large Fulbe support base formed the nerve centre for this opposition. In the resolutions, Mbida had called for a "democratisation" of Cameroon's north, which the lamidos saw as an attack on their traditional power. They thus threatened to secede to join French Chad, which set into motion a series of events that led to Mbida's resignation. Ahmadou Ahidjo, a northern Muslim, took his place on 18 February 1958.

=== Post-independence ===
On 1 January 1960, Cameroon gained its independence with Ahidjo its first president. The period of Ahidjo's presidency proved a boon to the territory, as the native son relished great projects on Garoua and the surrounding zone, particularly in the road network. He also initiated SODECOTON to supervise and ameliorate the region's cotton-based economy.

The Northern economy, long centered on Garoua, took a severe blow during the Biafra Secessionist War, which broke out in 1967 in Nigeria and severely hampered trade along the Bénoué. Even at the war's end in 1970, the port of Garoua never fully reached its previous levels of commerce.

Under Paul Biya, Cameroon's second president, the North continued to enjoy some improvements, as Biya was careful to cater to the region's Fulbe majority. Nevertheless, upon Biya's accession to power, the Cameroonian press accused an Ahidjo collaborator named Moussa Yaya of trying to turn the northern lamidos against the new president. Biya's main change to the region came in his splitting of Cameroon's Grand North into three provinces, the Adamawa, the North, and the Far North in 1983. That same year, Biya reshuffled his cabinet, and Ahidjo retaliated by urging all northern ministers to resign from the government. Biya retaliated by dismissing all ministers who had served under Ahidjo, claiming that some of them had participated in an assassination attempt on him. The alleged plotters were tried and found guilty on 27 February 1984. Ahidjo escaped to Paris. A further affront to Biya's rule came on 6 April 1984 when members of Cameroon's Republican Guard who hailed from the north attacked various government buildings in an attempt to overthrow the government. They also failed.

In the first months of 2014, thousands of refugees fleeing the violence in the Central African Republic arrived in Cameroon via the border towns of the North Region, East Region, and Adamawa Region.
