= Kapsiki people =

Kapsiki/Higi
Ka-Tsepkye/Psikyɛ
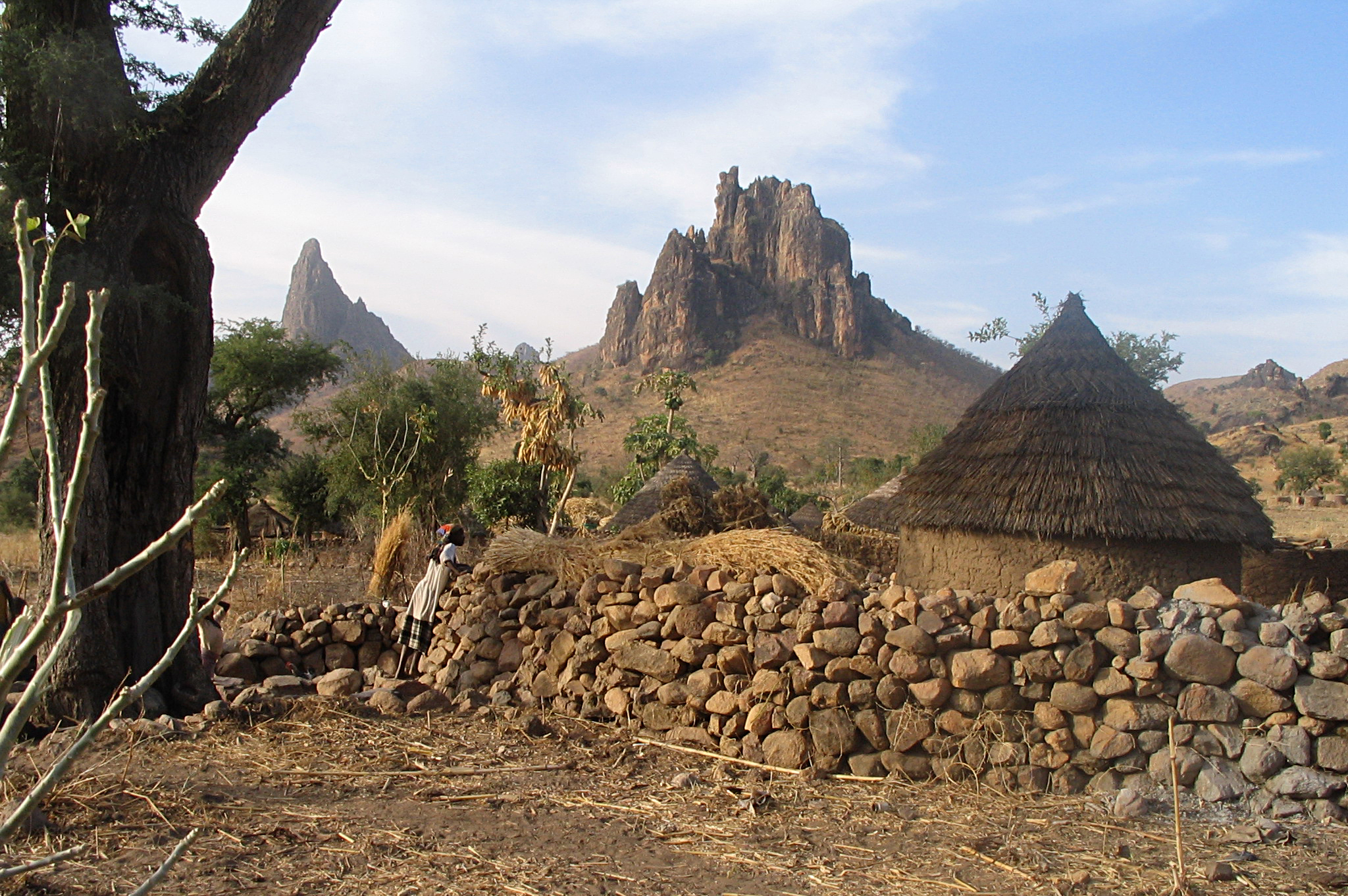
- Home on the outskirts of Rhumsiki

Total population
- 133,000

Regions with significant populations
- Mandara Mountains
- Cameroon: 111,000
- Nigeria: 22,000

Languages
- Psikye

Religion
- Traditional African religions, Islam

Related ethnic groups
- other Kirdis

Kapsiki (Ka-Tsepkye) is a people living on both sides of the border between North Cameroon and Northeast Nigeria. They are called Kapsiki in Cameroon, and Kamwe (Higi) in Nigeria. Together they amount to about 120,000 people. Their language, Psekiye or Kamwe, consists of eleven dialects including Nkafa, Sina, Ghye, Humsi, Dakwa and Tilli and belongs to the Chadic language family.

In Cameroon, the Kapsiki live on a plateau in the Far North Province in the center of the Mandara Mountains. They are considered one of Cameroon's Kirdi (pagan) ethnic groups due to their resistance to Islamisation during the Fulani jihad of Modibo Adama and Hama Yaji.

In Nigeria, the Kamwe live on the slopes of the mountains and the western plain. The Kapsiki have been living in this area for five centuries, long before the great slave hunts of the 19th century, but by this isolated habitat they have been able to maintain themselves against the Fulbe. This also applies to the other peoples of Mandara region, such as the Mafa, Mofu, Podoko Guisiga, or Daba.

The mountain region has a kaleidoscope of local cultures. The Kapsiki live in villages of 2000-6000 people, and subsist on livestock farming, agriculture and - in the village of Rumsiki in particular - on tourism.

The Malima Project has been helping Kapsiki populations in Cameroon with educational projects aimed at primary schooling. The Malima Project has created a documentary and organized events to promote its educational activities in the area.

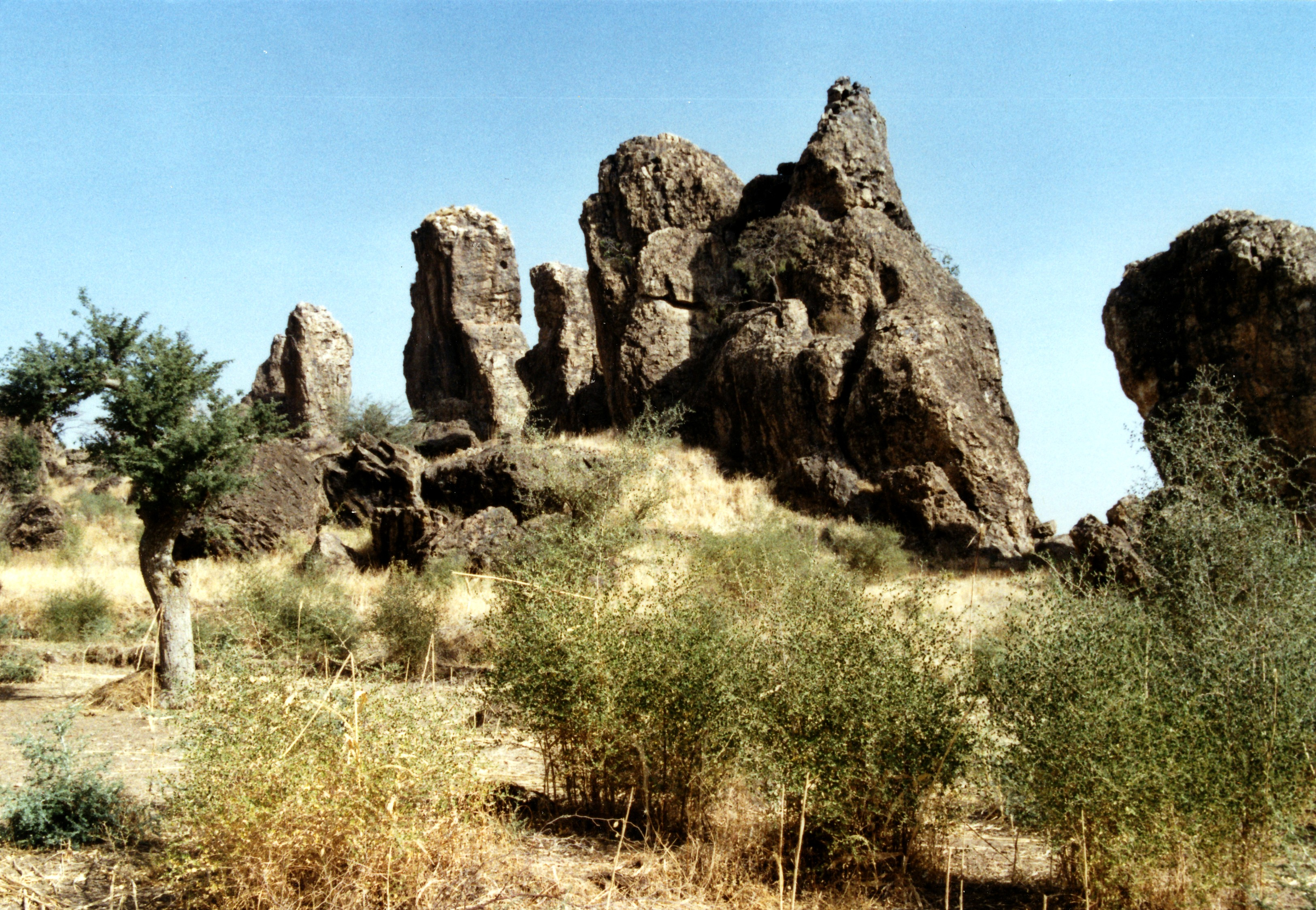
Volcanic peaks in the Kapsiki region

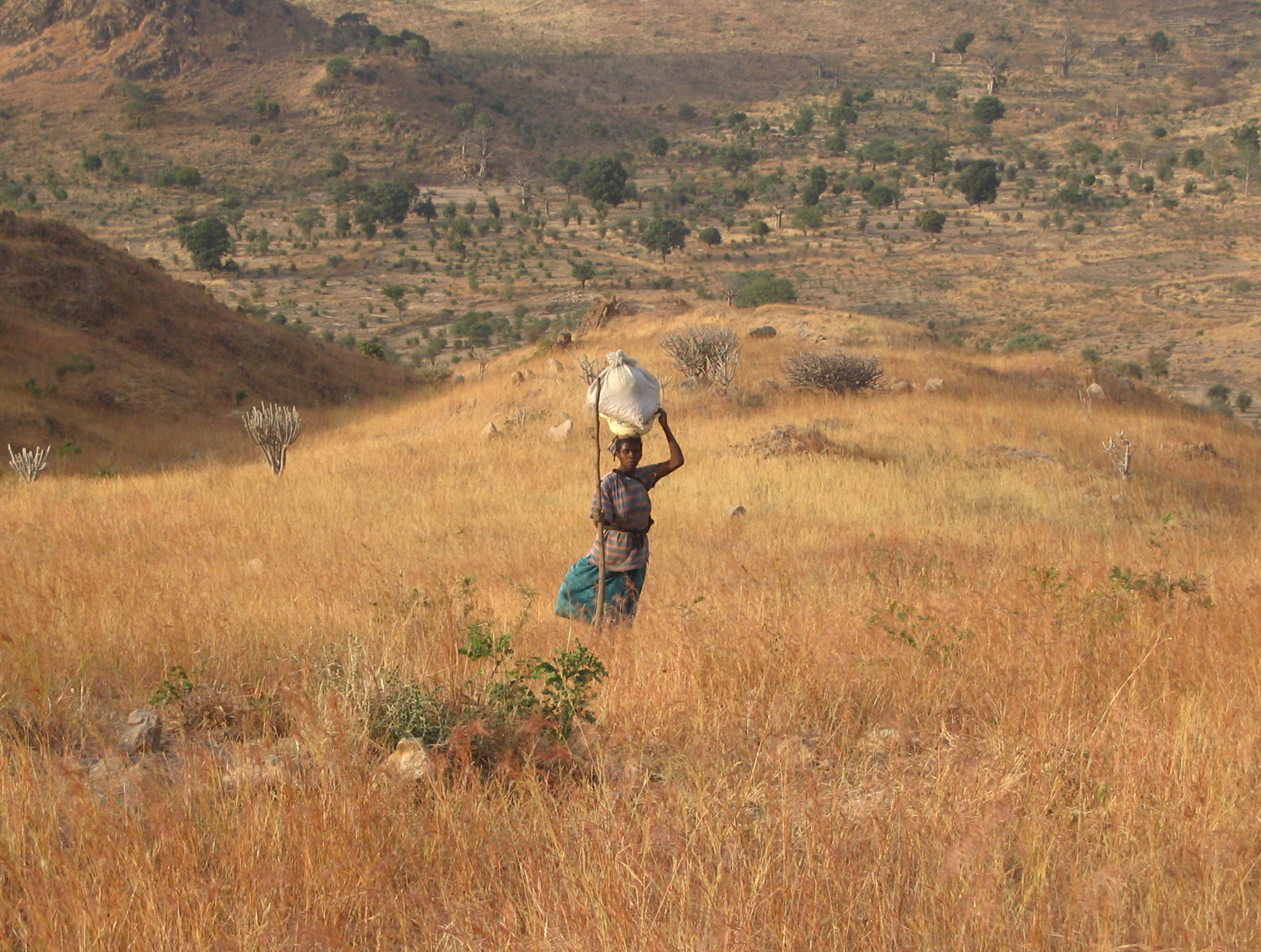
A woman outside Rhumsiki, 2004.

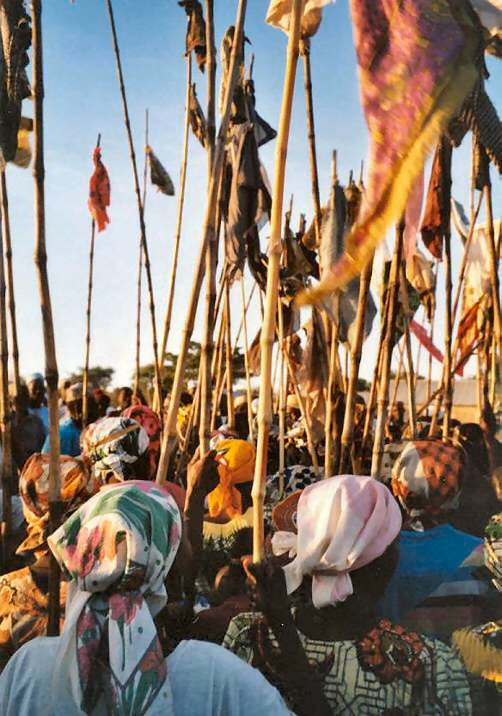
Kapsiki women at the yearly festival

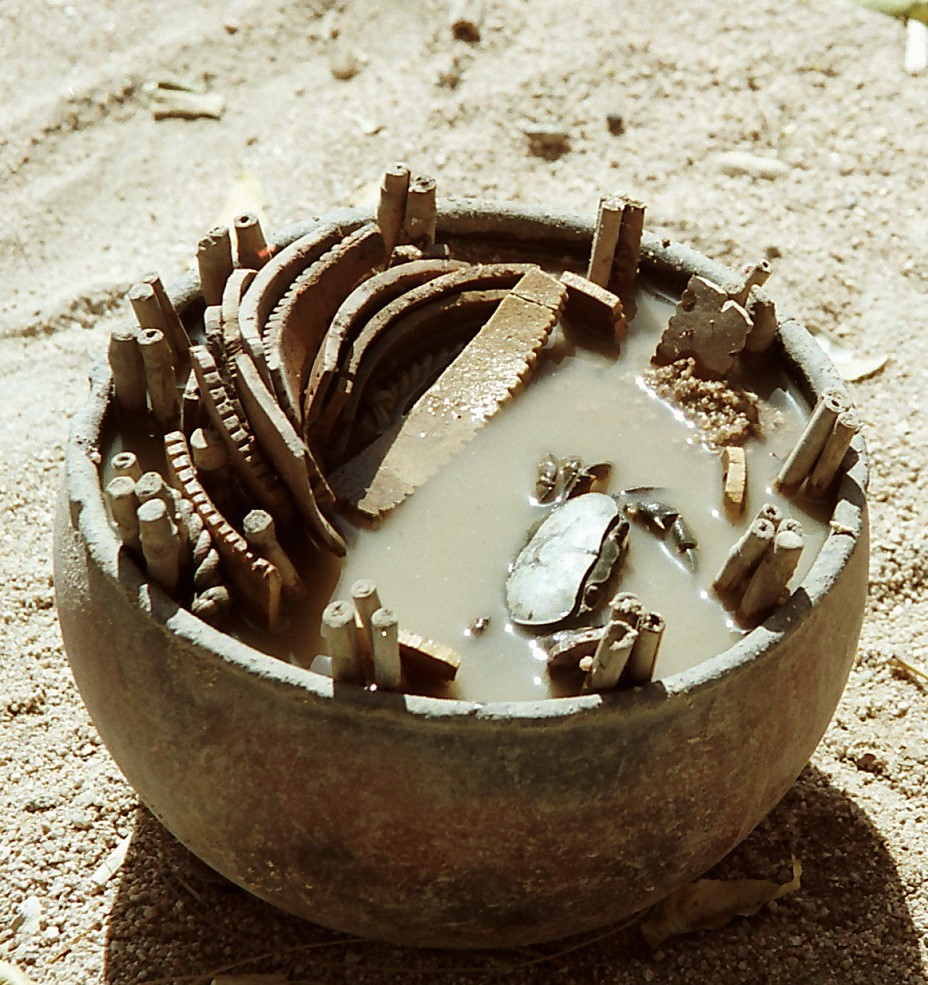
Crab divination by the Kapsiki

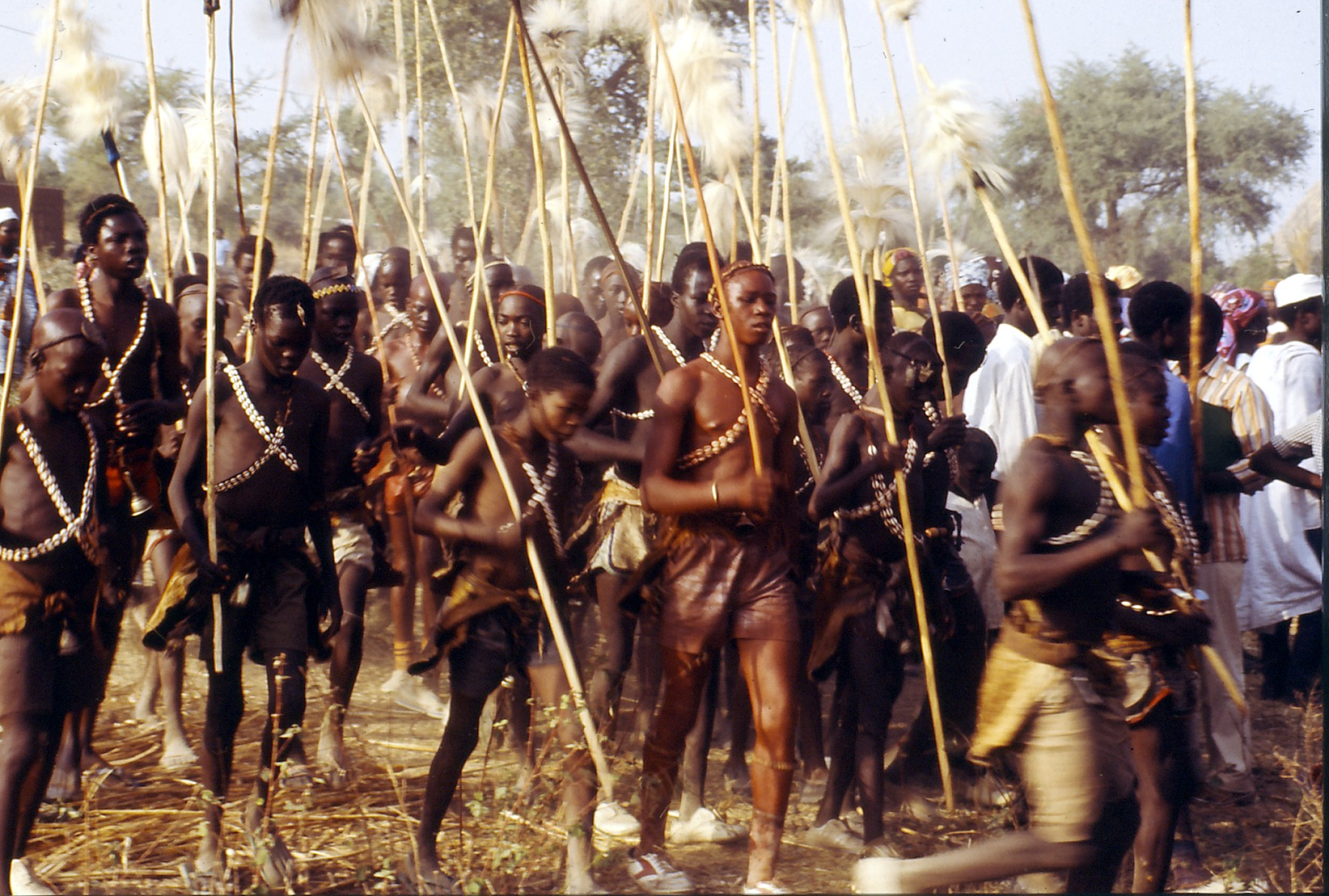
Just initiated boys in Rumsu, Kapsiki, 1995.
