= Mandara Plateau mosaic =

Ecoregion in Nigeria-Cameroon

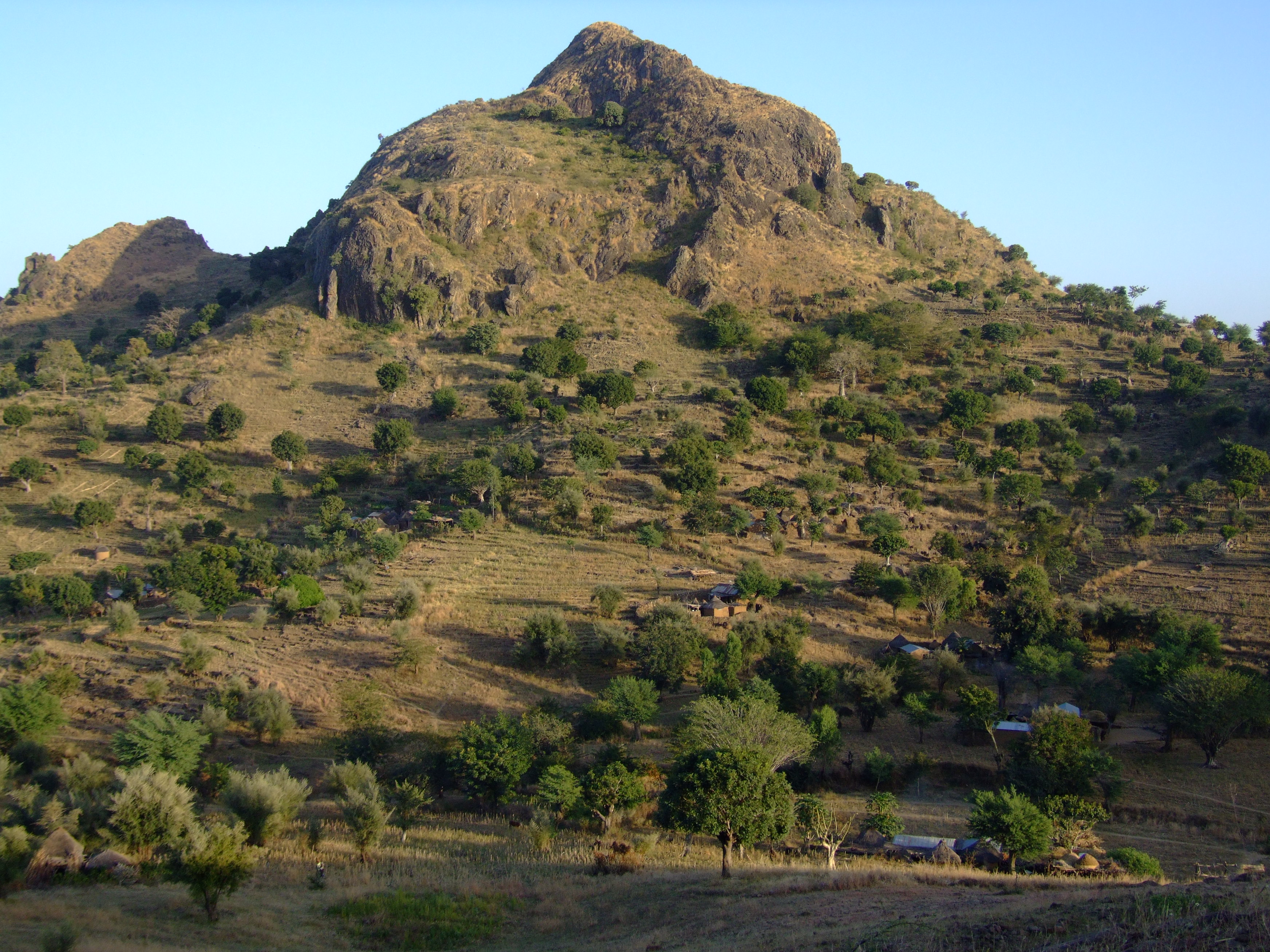
- Mandara Mountains, Cameroon

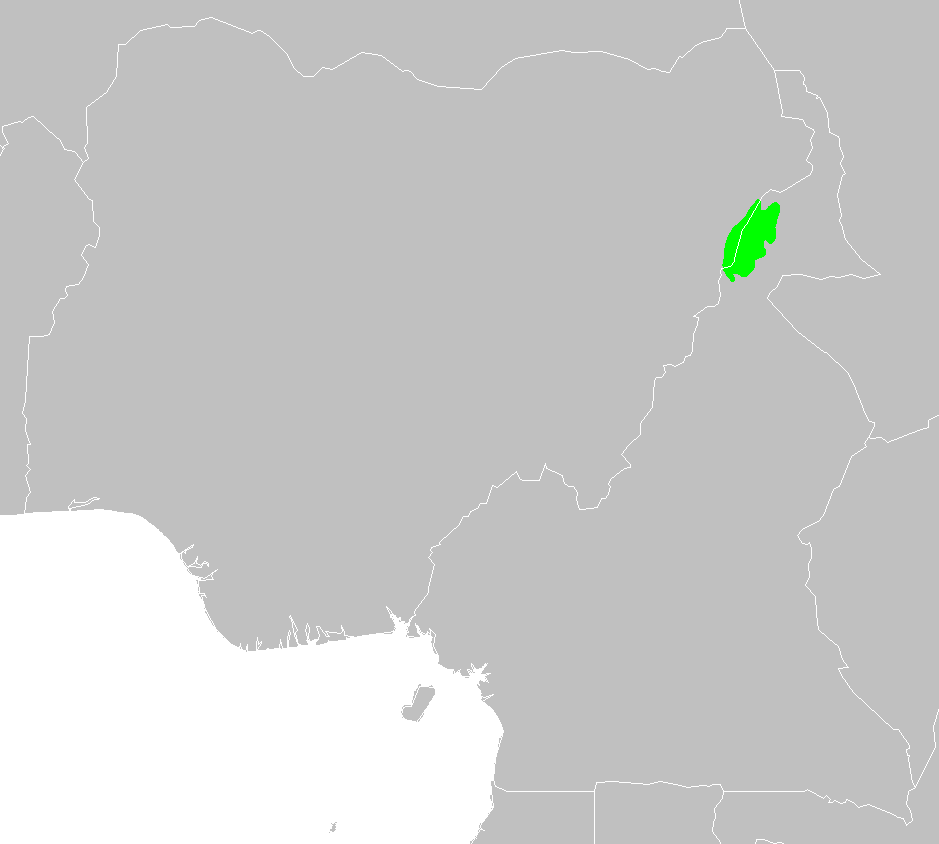
- map of the Mandara Plateau mosaic

Ecology
- Realm: Afrotropical
- Biome: tropical and subtropical grasslands, savannas, and shrublands
- Borders: East Sudanian savanna; Sahelian Acacia savanna, West Sudanian savanna

Geography
- Area: 7,526 km^{2} (2,906 sq mi)
- Countries: Cameroon; Nigeria

Conservation
- Conservation status: Critical/endangered
- Protected: 16 km² (0%)

The Mandara Plateau mosaic, also known as the Mandara Plateau woodlands, is a tropical grasslands, savannas, and shrublands ecoregion located in the Mandara Mountains of northern Nigeria and Cameroon.

== Geography ==
This ecoregion covers the Mandara Mountains, which straddle the border between northern Nigeria and northern Cameroon. The highest peak is Mont Oupay in Cameroon, which reaches 1,494 meters elevation. Most of the ecoregion lies between 1000 and 1200 meters elevation. The ecoregion includes high plains, plateau areas above 1200 meters elevation, and higher mountains.

The mountains are composed of ancient granite. Soils are generally nutrient-poor and infertile.

The valley of the Benue River lies to the south, and its tributaries drain the southern portion of the mountains. The northern portion drains north into the basin of Lake Chad.

== Climate ==
The ecoregion has tropical savanna climate, moderated by elevation. Average annual rainfall varies from 800 to 1000 mm depending on location. Most rain falls during the long wet season from May to October, and the rest of the year is dry.

== Flora ==
Open woodlands, dominated by the tree Isoberlinia doka, were once the dominant plant community in the ecoregion, but generally fragmented and degraded areas of woodland remain. In relatively intact woodlands the trees reach 12 to 18 meters high, and tree cover averages 50% or more. Grasses, including species of Andropogon and Beckeropsis, are predominant in the ground layer and understory.

The highest-elevation areas, from 1,200 to 1,494 meters elevation, are home to a mix of lowland (Sudanian) and montane and submontane (Afromontane) species, including some rare and endemic ones. High-elevation species include the large tree-like succulent Euphorbia desmondi and the trees Olea hochstetteri and Pittosporum viridiflorum.

== Fauna ==
Animals native to the mountains include the engangered western mountain reedbuck (Redunca fulvorufula adamauae) and breeding populations of Rüppell's griffin vulture (Gyps rueppelli) and Egyptian vulture (Neophron percnopterus).

The mountains have three endemic reptiles, the Mount Lefo chameleon (Trioceros wiedersheimi), Mabuya langheldi, and the African wall gecko (Tarentola ephippiata).

== People ==
The Mandara Mountains sustain a relatively dense population, despite the topography and relatively poor soils. Historically the mountains were a refuge for people resisting conquest or enslavement by states on the surrounding plains, and the mountains sustain a great diversity of languages and traditional religions. Local people developed a system of intensive agriculture involving the construction of terraces and measures to retain and improve soil fertility. Domestic sheep, goats, and cattle are kept and fed in pens during the crop-growing season, and their manure is deposited on the terraces after each harvest. Domestic animals are allowed to graze on the terraces' plant stubble after harvest to ensure that the manure fertilizes the fields. Household, human, and plant waste is used to improve the soil on terraces. Crop rotation between sorghum, millet, and legumes maintains soil fertility and reduces pests. Trees are used for shade, fodder, and green manure. Khaya senegalensis and Acacia albida are the most important, along with about 30 other species.

== Threats and preservation ==
Problems facing the region stem from the intense agriculture and include heavy grazing, collection of firewood, and burning, which have cleared nearly all of the region.

== Protected areas ==
Mozogo-Gokoro National Park and Mayo-Louti Forest Reserve in Cameroon cover lower-elevation portions of the mountains. The high peaks, which are of the greatest biological interest, are unprotected.

Mozogo-Goroko National Park has an area of 14.0 km^{2}. It was designated a forest reserve by the French Colonial Government in 1932, and designated a national park by the Republic of Cameroon in 1968. Burning and grazing have been curtailed within the park for decades, and it is covered in a mosaic of dense to open dry forests, gallery forests along seasonal watercourses, and thickets. Predominant trees include Senegalia ataxacantha, Anogeissus leiocarpa, Tamarindus indica, Psorospermum senegalense, Clerodendrum capitatum, and Celtis toka. The park sustains a relatively high species diversity despite its small size, with 110 woody plant species from 46 genera and 30 families, and 114 species of mammals, birds, reptiles, and amphibians. The flora is mostly semi-arid Sahelian species, but also includes Sudanian and Guinean species characteristic of more humid-climate regions.

Mayo-Louti Forest Reserve (60km^{2}) lies on high plains east of the main chain of mountains. The Mayo-Louti River forms the western border of the reserve, and Mayo-Wanday River forms the eastern. The reserve is mostly dry savanna woodland with species of Isoberlinia, Piliostigma, Crossopteryx, and Cussonia trees, and Khaya senegalensis growing along the three northward-flowing rivers that bound or cross the reserve.

Some of the region's communities preserve areas of forest as sacred groves, protected by traditional rules such as totems, taboos, and myths which discourage human exploitation. A survey of the sacred grove near the village of Mouhour, one km south of Mokolo, found the grove had relatively high plant species diversity, carbon stock, and tree cover.
