= Rhumsiki =

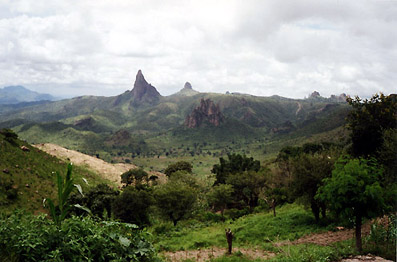

- Location in Cameroon
- Coordinates: 10°29′N 13°36′E
- Country: Cameroon
- Province: Far North Province

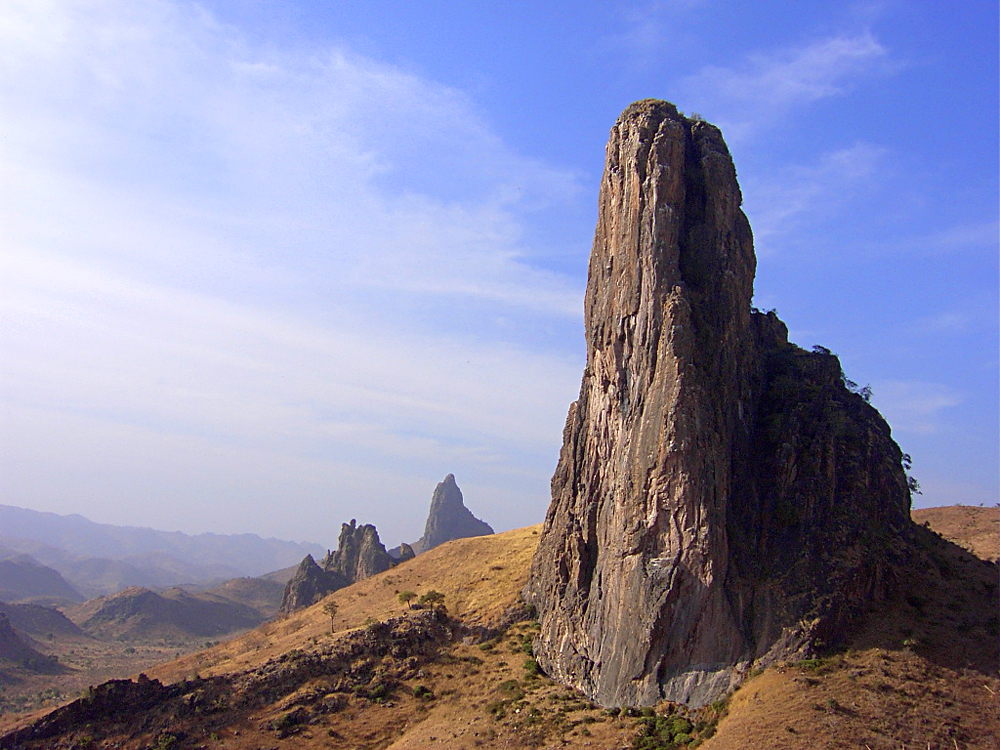
Rhumsiki peak

Rhumsiki, also spelt Rumsiki and Roumsiki, is a village in the Far North Province of Cameroon.

Rhumsiki is located in the Mandara Mountains 55 km (34 mi) from Mokolo, and is located 3 km (2 mi) from the border with Michika LGA, Adamawa State, Nigeria. The village is similar to many others in northern Cameroon. The inhabitants, members of the Kapsiki ethnic group, live in small houses built from local stone and topped with thatched roofs; these homes are scattered throughout the village and surrounding valley. Nevertheless, Rhumsiki is one of Cameroon's most popular tourist attractions and "the most touristic place in northern Cameroon".

The attraction is the surrounding scenery. Gwanfogbe, et al., describe it as "remarkable", Lonely Planet as "striking", Rough Guides as "breathtaking" and Bradt Guides as an "almost lunar landscape". Writer and explorer André Gide wrote that Rhumsiki's surroundings are "one of the most beautiful landscapes in the world." The spectacular effect is created by surrounding volcanic plugs (the remnants of long-dormant volcanoes), basalt outcroppings, and the Mandara Mountains. The largest (and most photographed) of these rocks is Kapsiki Peak, a plug standing 1,224 m (4,016 ft) tall.

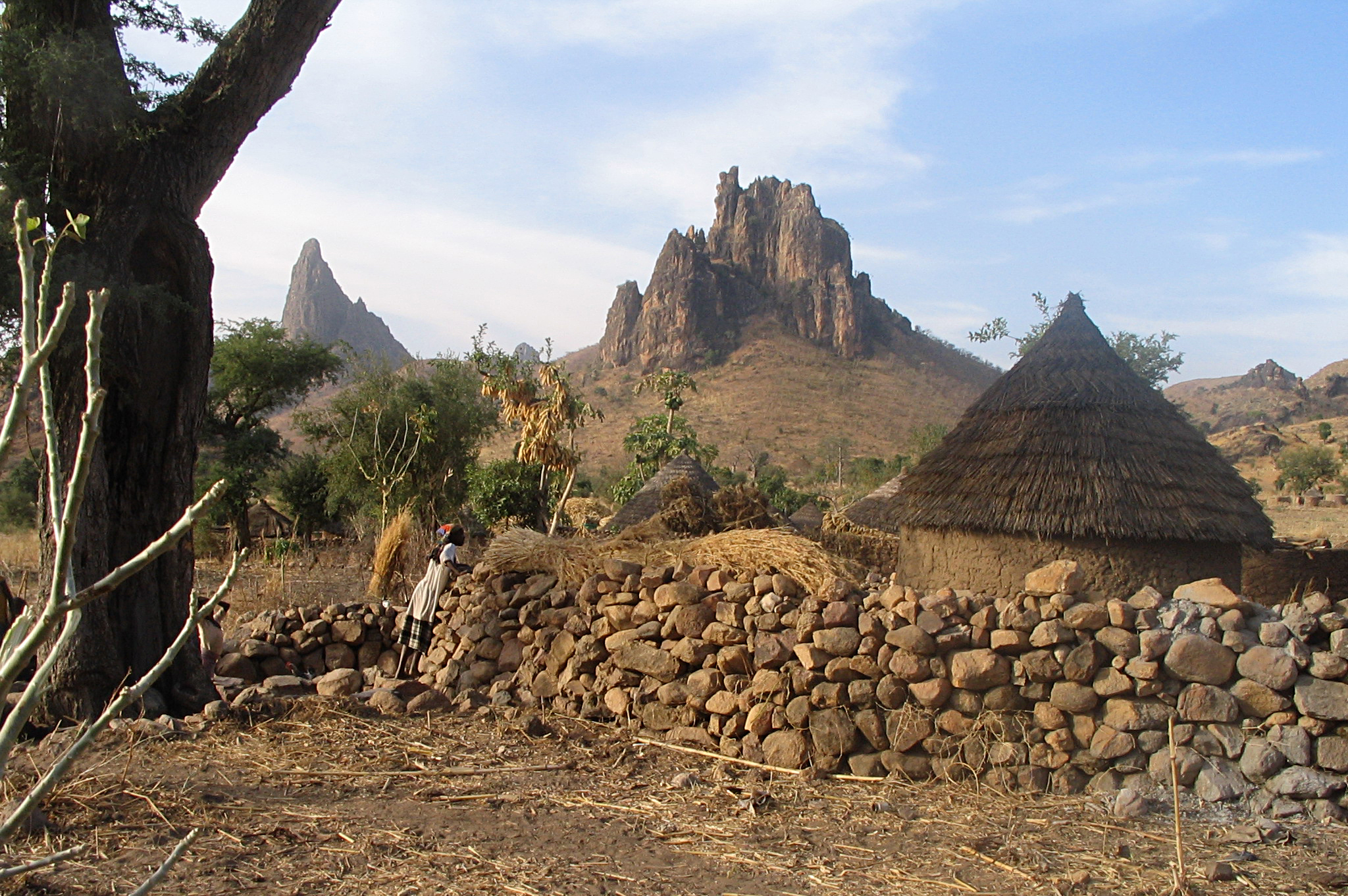
Kapsiki home of Rhumsiki

Rhumsiki has adapted to the flow of tourists. Children in the village act as tour guides, showing visitors several pre-arranged attractions. Among these are craftspeople, such as blacksmiths, potters, spinners, and weavers; native dancers; and the féticheur, a fortune-teller who predicts the future based on a crab's manipulation of pieces of wood. Rhumsiki is now a standard item on most tourist itineraries, a fact of which the travel literature disapproves. Rough Guides describes Rhumsiki as "overrun" and "tainted by organized tourism", and Lonely Planet calls it "something of a tourist trap." The standard guided tour of the village leads The Rough Guide to doubt its authenticity: "The appeal of the visit is largely to get a taste of the 'real' Cameroon, and the built-in flaw is that the more people come, the more distorted and unreal life in the village becomes."

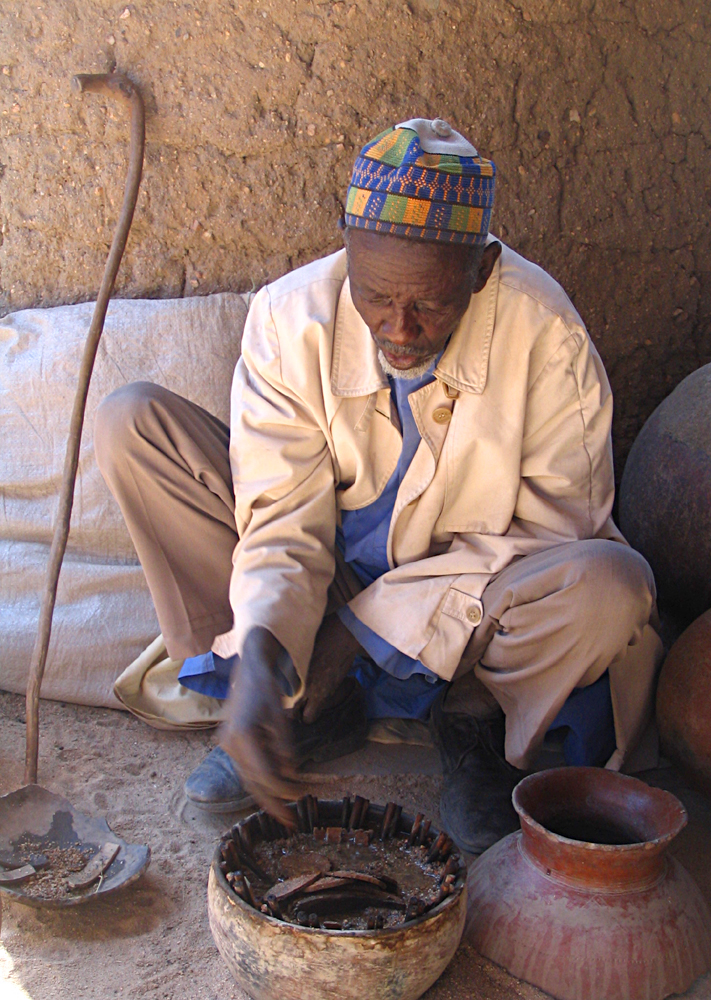
Rhumsiki crab sorcerer

== History ==
Local legend has it that Rhumsiki was settled by indigenous Animist Kirdi peoples who escaped the Muslim advances of the Fulani peoples in the 18th century and sought refuge in rugged country and wilderness.

Since that time, the Kirdi people have ever lived in Rhumsiki and have supported agriculture, practiced beliefs of Animism and weaved the rock formations of the Mandara Mountains in the fabric of their beliefs.
