= Diy-Gid-Biy =

- Location of Diy-Gid-Biy sites on map of Cameroon
- 10°55′N 13°50′E
- Location: Cameroon

UNESCO World Heritage Site
- Official name: Diy-Gid-Biy Cultural Landscape of the Mandara Mountains
- Type: Cultural
- Criteria: iii
- Designated: 2025 (47th session)
- Reference no.: 1745

The Diy-Gid-Biy (DGB) sites are archaeological sites located around the Mandara Mountains of northern Cameroon and Nigeria, overlooking the several kilometers long Shikewe watershed. These sites get their name Diy-Gid-Biy from the Mafa language, which can be translated as "place of chiefly residence." There are 16 of these DGB sites which date back to around the 15th century AD. While knowledge of these sites has existed for some time, only in 2001 archaeologists began to investigate the sites and their cultural heritage in relation to the region.

== Archaeology ==
=== The site ===
The Diy-Gid-Biy sites are of varying sizes, with DGB-1 and 2 being the largest. They are spread out over approximately 25 km, although DGB-1 and 2 are only 100 meters apart and are sometimes referred to as the same site. The DGB sites are constructed in a system of terraces and platforms built using a dry stone architecture that doesn't appear in any other sites using local granite and rocks, with stairs and silos being placed throughout. After studying various sections of whole and collapsed walls, archaeologists discovered that the walls were not constructed with shaped square stones, but rather built using stones found lying around that were carefully fitted together with smaller stones which propped up the walls and held them together. Based on research done by archaeologists, the DGB sites were built in several phases by the original builders who created several layers of terraces and expanded the sites. The sites were then abandoned by the builders, but some were later on modified by the Mafa who filled in some of the areas with rubble and repurposed the bricks for various reasons.

The DGB sites have drawn in archaeologists, not only because of their unique structure and build, but because throughout most of the Manda Mountains there appears little evidence of occupation older than two centuries, while the plains below the mountains have presented archaeologists with sites dating back approximately 2,500 years ago. In fact, the DGB sites are the only coherent sites that have been found in the Mandara Mountains dating back so far.

Through the use of radiocarbon dating, archaeologists have been able to determine that the majority of the 16 sites were first constructed in the 15th century, although the wide range of dates from the various stages of development had originally made it difficult to figure out the structures beginnings. DGB-1 is a unique anomaly though in that radiocarbon dating places that particular site's origins back farther to around 1250 AD. At this site there has also been evidence that a pre-DGB culture lived at this location before construction was started, but little is truly known about this earlier people.

=== Excavation and discovery ===
Although knowledge of the sites has existed for many years, true archaeological research only began in 2001 with the excavations of DGB-2 and 8 by Nicholas David. A number of artifacts have been found at the sites, with items such as various ceramics originating from the Mandara Mountain region. Other artifacts that have been found are unfamiliar iron objects, a ground greenstone axe, upper grindstones, quartz hammerstones, and grindstone-mortars. While most of the objects found originate back to a time before the Mafa lived in the region, archaeologists have noted that the ceramics that have been found are barely, if at all, different from modern Mafa pottery.

At DGB-1 though, while regional items such as pottery and stone tools were found, other artifacts such as copper and glass items that didn't originate from the area were discovered as well, thus indicating that the people of DGB-1 had contact with peoples of other areas, something that wasn't as evident through previously excavated artifacts. In fact, other archaeological excavations of the Mandara region have presented a lack of artifacts originating from outside the area, with DGB-1 being basically the only site to show evidence of contact with areas beyond the Mandara region.

Other artifacts that have been found at DGB-1 include iron spear tips and iron arrow heads found under the floor of the site, as well as an iron hoe and chain. These finds suggest that the inhabitant at one point smelted iron and forged their own tools, although it is unknown when these items were made. The make of the iron artifacts has also been compared to iron items made by the Mafa of today, which bear a likeness to the artifacts, even though the Mafa and the builders of the DGB sites are not one and the same.

=== Hypothesis of use ===
Based on the archaeology done around the sites, as well as traditions used by the modern Mafa of the region, experts believe that the DGB sites were constructed as ritual structures relating to rain and water. The DGB sites began to appear around the time that a severe drought was occurring in the region, and so the construction makes sense in regards to ritual practices of the Mafa today who inhabit the region. Archaeologists have also found a large amount of sand and gravel from a local river that had been brought to DGB-2 and 8, possibly as a physical representation of flowing water.

Several other suggestions as to the purpose of the DGB sites have also been given, especially in the description of the sites presented in the UNESCO World Heritage tentative list. These purposes include the sites being defensive forts or places of refuge in times of war, places of burial for local chiefs, locations of residence for the elites of the region, and/or market centers or places of trade. While some of these ideas at the moment lack evidence to back them up, the construction of the DGB sites with towers and walls has supported the idea of the locations being defensive structures, while the finding of artifacts that didn't originate from the region has also convinced others that at least DGB-1 may have had a purpose in regards to engaging with foreign peoples. These foreign artifacts have even led some archaeologists, such as Nicholas David, to the hypothesis that at least the DGB-1/2 sites acted as places of interchange with peoples to the north, possibly as a place of trade.

=== Possible interactions ===
A number of archaeologists have presented the concept that a great deal of the interactions that occurred with foreign peoples at DGB-1 seem to have happened around the same time that European and Arabic writers noted the rise of Wandala, otherwise known as the Mandara Kingdom. Thus experts believe that some sort of trade occurred between the two peoples, as well as there possibly being a relationship between the creation of the DGB sites and Wandala around the same time.

== World Heritage Status ==
This site was added to the UNESCO World Heritage Tentative List on April 18, 2006 in the cultural category. Reasons for presence in the list include: because they provide a link between the past and present history of the Mandara region, they provide a unique archaeological perspective to the area as sites that stand on their own, and they are viewed by different native peoples as sacred ground which brings them closer to the spirits through the construction of many different alters constructed on or around the sites. The site was officially designated a World Heritage Site in 2025.
