= Kirdi =

Ethnic groups of the northern Nigeria–Cameroon border

Kirdi people
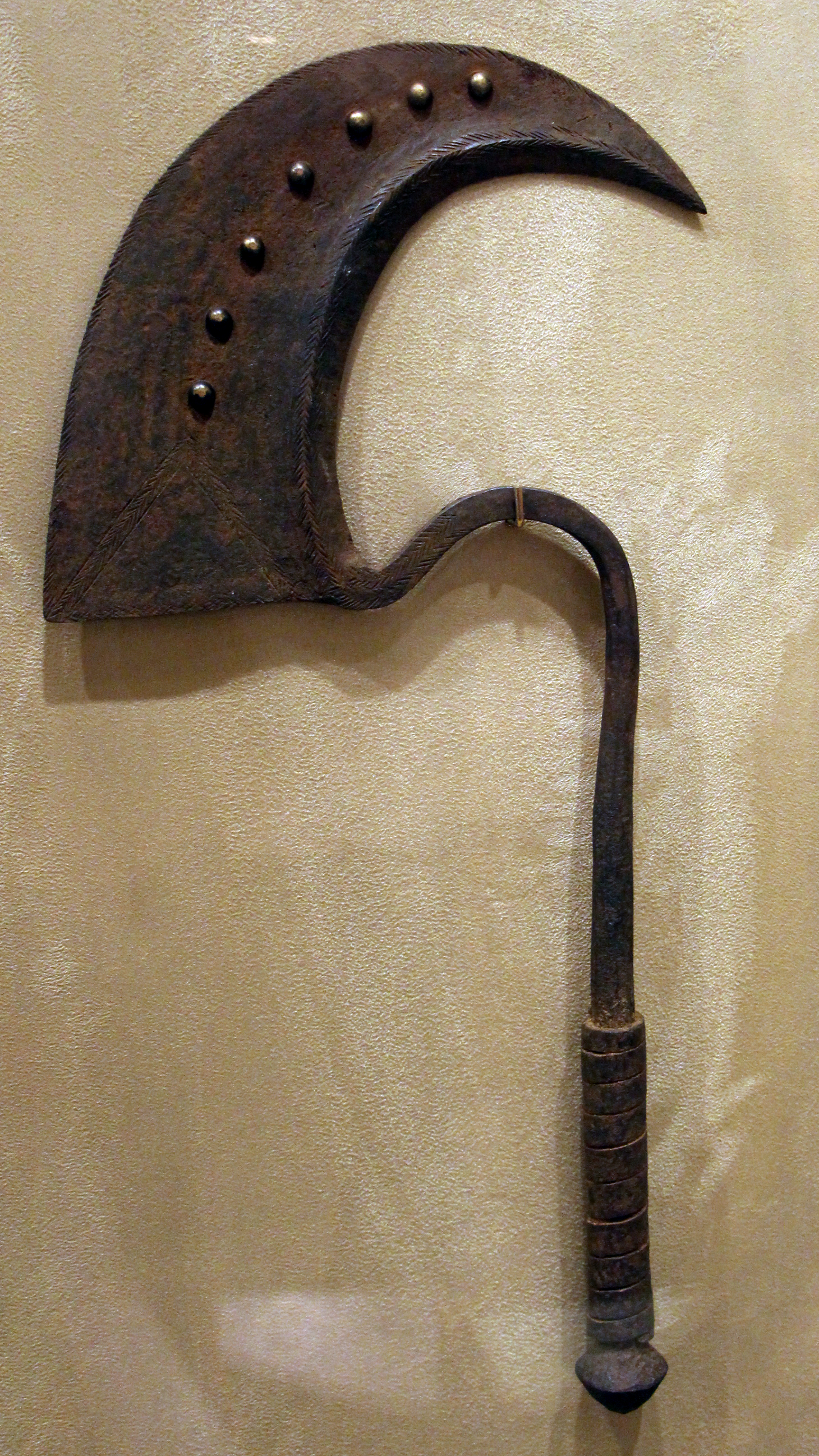
- Iron kirdi valuta from Museu Afro Brasil

Total population
- 15,029,000

Languages
- Chadic languages, French language

Religion
- Christianity, Traditional Faiths, Islam

The Kirdi (/ˈkɜːrdɪ/) are the many cultures and ethnic groups who inhabit northwestern Cameroon and northeastern Nigeria.

The term was applied to various ethnic groups who refused to convert to Islam after Islamic conquests of the region and was a pejorative, although some writers have reappropriated it. The term comes from the Kanuri word for pagan; the Kanuri people are predominantly Muslim.

In the eleventh century, people such as the Fulani converted to Islam and spread throughout West Africa in the following centuries. They had also begun migrating to Cameroon, where they had attempted to convert the pre-existing peoples. Therefore, the kirdi, have fewer similarities culturally or linguistically as they do in their general geographic dispersal, primarily situated in the arid steppe and savannahs of North and Far North regions of Cameroon

Estimates of how many groups may be described as Kirdi vary, with estimates ranging from 26 (2007) to more than 40 (1977).

The Bata, Fali, Fata, Gemjek, Guidar, Giziga, Hurza, Kapsiki, Mada, Mafa, Massa, Matakam, Mofou, Mora, Mousgoum, Muyang, Ouldeme, Podoko, Toupouri, Vame and Zulgo are all considered Kirdi, due to their resistance to Islam. They speak Chadic and Adamawa languages.

The first mentioning of Kirdi is by Denham in 1826 (1985:145) who translates the word Kerdies as "Negroes who have never embraced the Mohammedan faith".

Generally, the Kirdi have been underrepresented in the Cameroonian political system. Based on the frequently quoted CIA World Factbook, the Kirdi represent 11 percent of the Cameroon population, compared to the predominantly Muslim and more culturally homogeneous Fulani at 10 percent of the Cameroon population; then Cameroon Highlanders 31 percent, Equatorial Bantu 19 percent, Northwestern Bantu, 8 percent, and Eastern Nigritic 7 percent, and other African and non-Africans representing 14 percent. Given their historical under-representation, the Kirdi has never constituted a political voting bloc. Seeking to gain Kirdi votes, the Fulani, while historically they despise the Kirdi, cajole them into boosting their electoral chances, such as for the Cameroonian Union or UC. Although the Kirdi community is vastly diverse in cultures, based on pressures from rival groups, such as the Fulani, they have come to see themselves as a single group of people, and have had an increasing interest in representation in the political system.

== Main Kirdi peoples ==
=== Bata ===
The Bata people of Northern Cameroon number only approximately 13,500 persons in their current historical region. They are Chadic people. The language that they speak is Bata, from the Chadic language family. Many Bata people have converted to Islam, while those that remain in their historic region continue pagan practices.

=== Fali ===
The Fali people are concentrated in mountainous areas of Northern Cameroon and some live in northeastern Nigeria. In Nigeria, they are called the Bana people. They speak various unrelated languages. These people have origins from the Ngomma people, who founded an ancient capital of their once sovereign land, Timpil. They are monotheistic and atavistic but later became Christian. The Fali are distinguished from the other Kirdi for their vibrant ornately decorated textiles and clothing.

=== Kapsiki ===
The Kapsiki people, also known as the Kamwe people, live in villages of 2000–6000 people, and subsist on livestock farming, agriculture and, in the village of Rumsiki in particular, on tourism. In Nigeria, the Kapsiki people live on the slopes of the mountains and the western plains. The Kapsiki have been living in this area for five centuries, long before the great slave hunts of the 19th century, but due to their isolated habitat they have been able to maintain themselves against the Fulbe people. Other peoples of the Mandara region, such as the Mafa, Mofu, Podoko Guisiga, or Daba peoples have also remained protected due to their isolated habitat.

=== Mafa ===
The Mafa people are located in the Far North Cameroon region and are known for many agricultural technological achievements. These ethno-engineering procedures include: small-scale irrigation, canalization, and drainage systems. In addition, the Mafa practice an extensive variety of soil fertility management procedures, including: crop rotation and mixed cropping, Agroforestry, biomass, nutrient management. They speak the Mafa language of the Chadic language family.

=== Mofu ===
The Mofu people primarily exist in the extreme North Province of Cameroon. Their languages are separate languages of the Biu–Mandara branch of the Chadic language family.

=== Mousgoum ===
The Musgum people (Musgum or Mulwi) are a Chadic ethnic group in Cameroon. Many Musgums engage in agriculture with staple crops including: ground nuts and cotton which are sold for commercial use.

=== Tupuri ===
The Tupuri people, also known as the Tupouri, have historically resided east of Kaélé in the Kaele division and in the Kar-Hay subdivision of the Mayo-Danay division of the Far North Province. They are a kirdi ethnic group and language, that stretches from northern Cameroon into Chad. This language is from the Chadic language family. The language they speak is also called Tupuri.

=== Zulgo ===
While being a Chadic people, their language is from the Zulgu-Gezmek apart from the Chadic language family.

== Name origins ==
There is controversy regarding the name “Kirdi”, as it has come to be associated as a pejorative. This derogatory term has been adopted by Fulani and other Cameroonian languages. The term has an origin from Kanuri and is ultimately thought to be derived from the Arabic language word for "monkey". Although some writers have considered the name as a proper moniker for the collection of peoples. Presently, Kirdi bears the general meaning "pagan," in opposition to the Fulani and other Muslim groups. In recent years, many have reclaimed the label as a means of identification and political unity, giving rise to the “kirditude” movement.

Kirditude is thought to have been kickstarted as a movement in opposition to the largely Muslim Fulani political base for Maigari Bello Bouba’s UNDP during the 1991 election campaign. The term is only recognized in the Extreme North and North regions, while it is not used in the Adamawa region, the Fulfulde term Matchoubé, meaning "slave" or "servant," is used instead. Most groups, that are recognized under the umbrella term that is the kirdi peoples speak Afro-Asiatic languages, though some speak Niger-Congo Languages, this depends on the geographic dispersal of the groups, while there are still groups considered kirdi that have remained within the governance of Nigeria as opposed to Cameroon. Like Cameroon, the kirdi are a vast multitude of many diverse languages, some of which vary by entire language families.

The historical meaning of the word, kirdi, can be best translated to mean the following, ‘all those who were non-Muslims and who could therefore be subjected to slavery’. Those that rejected conversion to Islam or to be relegated as merely a tributary during the Adamawa Emirate were capture as slaves. This is where the term kirdi earned its use. However, writers have repurposed the term to encompass a general collective group not united with language, customs, or religion, but of the specific negation of one religion, as well as being historical peoples of the Mandara Mountains. From this, Kirdi has come to be interpreted in the context of a group of people united by the social ideology that emphasizes resistance overall.

== History ==
The Republic of Cameroon, the locus of most Kirdi began at the start of colonization from insurgent Muslim groups. By the 1400s Europeans started their occupation, such as from the Kamerun then split between north and south regions by France and Britain. Following the Second World War came under the United Nations as UN Trusteeships, anticipating that the Kirdi would be granted their own self-governance, which seemed perspective as most political groups began to form from the people groups. During the eleventh century and onwards into the nineteenth century Muslim Fulani from the Niger basin have migrated to Cameroon, this continued into the nineteenth century. The Fulani population grew at the coast and southern area of Cameroon and converted the pre-existing inhabitants. During the late 1770s and the early 19th century, the Fulani, an Islamic pastoral people of the western Sahel, conquered most of what is now northern Cameroon, subjugating or displacing its largely non-Muslim inhabitants.

In 1960, Cameroon declared its independence and adopted a constitution by popular referendum. By 1972, the constitution was redrafted essentially establishing a one-party state. Ahmadou Babatoura Ahidjo, a Fulani Muslim from French Cameroons, would remain in power from 1960 to his death in 1989. The kirdi have sought representation in recent years from minority parties like the Social Democratic Front (SDF) in opposition to the Fulani-dominated Union Nationale pour la Démocratie et le Progrès (UNDP). Christian missionaries have had some success among the Kirdi in recent years. Major Kirdi personalities include Luc Ayang and Etienne Hollong.

== Religion ==
Christian missions have had some success among the Kirdi in recent years. While kirdi generally bears the meaning "pagan," in opposition to the Fulani and other Muslim groups, they do not all practice atavistic customs and pagan rituals, many have converted to Christianity and are increasingly self-identifying as a Christian political bloc, to contrast the Muslims opposing blocs.

== Islamisation during the Fulani jihad ==
The Kirdi are the historical people of the Mandara mountains, as well as the historical peoples of the Far North Region, Cameroon. In the nineteenth century the Islamic scholar and jihad, Modibbo Adama, began the Fulani colonization. This mass migration led to more than 60 percent of the region's total population being of Fulani peoples, not native to that region. The great displacement of the historical residents of these regions started in the early nineteenth century, from what would come to be known as the Adamawa Emirate. The Fulani colonization would eventually lead to the Fulani becoming the preeminent people in the region. Given that the Fulani are not native to the region, it is a remarkable achievement that they became the dominant population. Modibbo Adama was a Fulani scholar and holy warrior. Before leading the jihad, he was a student of the school of Islam. He was mentored under the teachings of Fulani mystic Usman dan Fodio. Adama's reign lasted from 1806 to his death in 1847. Modibbo Adama conquered the region of Fombina, which presently makes up the areas of modern-day Cameroon and Nigeria. His actions opened the opportunity for more of his people to enter into the region and claim the territory as theirs. After declaring his own jihad, as Usman had done in Northern regions in Chad, Adama entered into the region accompanied with a legion of people dedicated to converting the region under which these tribes resided. Adama met Usman in 1806, probably in Gwandu. There, they learned that his intention was to extend his jihad eastward, into Fumbina. The goal was ostensibly to convert various Kirdi (pagan) peoples to Islam. Once under the control of the region, Adama gave enemy nations two options: either convert to Islam or submit to losing autonomy and becoming a tributary state. Those groups that both formed their own formidable resistance but lacked the structural integrity available under nations gifted with a centralized government, had but one option: become slaves. The kirdi then became the group that lacked a government to resist Fulani intrusion and so became slaves to the Fulani and placed under their oppressive reign until they submitted to Islam. To this day, many of the nations that resisted conversion at the time of the Adama Emirate, still are not Muslim now. Major changes occurred based on the legacy of Modibo Adama even after the sovereignty of his caliphate was lost to other powers from the south. New converts to Islam learned Arabic writing and studied the Qur'an (DeLancey, 2010). This introduced increased rates of literacy in a region that had virtually no literacy. While the Kirdi tended to be sedentary cultivators of their land, the Fulani and associated groups were primarily pastoralists, which led to the land changing starkly to one that better suits cattle. Deforestation by the Fulani had permanently altered the land of the Northern plateau.

== Disenfranchisement ==
In line with many sub-Saharan African states Cameroon has had a tumultuous history under authoritarian ruling powers, their first president a Muslim Fulani, Ahmadou Babatoura Ahidjo. The kirdi has had to battle with discrimination and disenfranchisement from many other powers particularly those groups who had a history of campaigns to convert the collection of communities towards Islam. As it currently stands, the religious demographic of the Republic of Cameroon is just under half Muslim, mostly concentrated by the coast by Bantu people communities, while the Kirdi tend to state in the savanna further inland in the north.

== Food ==
Located in West Africa, Cameroon the elongated triangle has popularly been known as miniature Africa, or the microcosm of all of Africa. Many of the staple foods of the Kirdi have been influenced through trade and exploitation from European powers. These influences came first with the arrival of the British in 1800, followed by the French, then the Germans. Although other cuisines from China, Italy, and Russia have crept into the Northern region of Cameroon, as the capital of Cameroon, Yaoundé, is a highly metropolitan city in Africa. The kirdi have some traditional foods specific to their specific region, which reflect some of the many staples common to West Africa. The most popular staple is fufu, which generally refers to a dough made from boiled and pounded starchy provisions such as mandioca, plantains, yams, cassava, or malanga. In some recipes, fat is added to fufu for added fortification. This fat can derive from animals or plants. Local ingredients include the following staple foods in Cameroon: cassava, yams, rice, plantain, potato, sweet potatoes, maize, beans, millet, a wide variety of cocoyams, and many vegetables. Melons, pumpkins, and beans are also cultivated.

== Medicinal practices ==
Cameroon like other West African countries has a pattern of mortality that far outstretches that of the developed world. This has been slowly improving with the help of global initiatives that have aided in bringing vaccines, and western medicine to the region. Diligent workers came to the local communities to assist professionals and provide equipment, establishing a link between traditional medicine and western medicine. However, continuing high rates of mortality indicate the significant impact of infectious diseases and the high risks of death during pregnancy and childbirth. Respiratory diseases remain one of the leading causes of death. To mitigate the harsh conditions that pastoral communities of Far North Region, Cameroon have to deal with, international health organizations have invested in understanding the ethnobotany of this region, and the thousands of years of traditional medicinal practices that have provided some relief before multilateral health initiatives. These medical practices include the consumption of raw plants, crude extraction methods, decoctions, and fermentation processes. Plants used for medicinal practices include Cissus quadrangularis, which is significant to Fali in Cameroon, who are reported to wash their dead in a decoction of the plant.

== Spiritual practices ==
The kirdi, in keeping with their traditional practices prior to the jihad, had practiced pagan beliefs. These beliefs had been identified as monotheistic. The followers of the Fali religion have kept this faith for thousands of years. Their beliefs include that there is a creator god that is omnipotent. This superior overarching character to the Fali and similar branches have dubbed it as Muttaf, although other names have also been adopted for the same general concept. As well as the creator god, the Fali believe, there is another by the name of Ona, which has come to signify mother earth. The Ona deity has been used interchangeably with the planet Earth. When the Fali speak of the planet, the soil, the natural resources, and the passing of time, they do so in respect to Ona. Ona, together with Muttaf, is responsible for the creation of all things. These creations credited to the deity known as Muttaf, range from relatives, ancestors, the individual, the natural resources of the Earth, the Earth included, the sky, and everything else. However, Muttaf is not singularly the creator of all things, such as the monotheistic god adopted by Abrahamic religions, but rather they identify him as purely one who is undetectable to human intelligence. An area where Islamic thought bleeds into other religious sects, the god Muttaf is prohibited from being drawn, as by its very nature he is opposed to being limited by any and all modes of expression. There have been cases where violence has ensued spurred from drawings of Muttaf. Additionally, the religion includes supernatural beings, as people that have fought to keep their atavistic beliefs while being influenced under the subjugation of religions such as Islam. They establish one realm where the humans inhabit, and another realm of holy deities, and a third intermediary universe that interacts with both where the supernatural beings exist. These spirits can be summoned and communicated with the Fali followers, so as to make pardons for the holy deities on the believer's behalf. Some of these supernatural deities of the intermediary realm include genies capable of granting wishes, sacred crocodiles that are to be coveted and praised, and the black snake. By 2009, a growing proportion of Fali Kirdi had converted to Christianity, although many of these converts still maintain their syncretic dogmatism. The population of Fali in total is well over 250, 000 people, or roughly the same as the population of Suriname (2017). Currently, 99 percent of Fali are Christian. The most prominent churches in Fali land, being in the northwestern region of Cameroon, are Catholic, Baptist, and EYN with few Pentecostal churches emerging in recent days.
