= Mafa language =

Afro-Asiatic language

Mafa
- Mafahay
- Native to: Cameroon, Nigeria
- Region: Far North Province, Borno State, Adamawa State
- Native speakers: 210,000 (2005)
- Language family: Afro-Asiatic: Chadic; Biu–Mandara; Wandala–Mafa; Mafa languages (A.5); South (c); Mafa

Language codes
- ISO 639-3: maf
- Glottolog: mafa1239

Mafa is an Afro-Asiatic language spoken in northern Cameroon and Northern Nigeria by the Mafa people.

== Dialects ==
Mafa is widely spoken in the department of Mayo-Tsanaga from Mokolo to the north. Mafa includes the following dialects.

- Central Mafa in Koza commune and in Mokolo town
- West Mafa in the northwest of Mokolo Commune (Magoumaz)
- East Mafa in the northeast (Soulede and Roua communes)

There are 136,000 speakers in Cameroon.

== Phonology ==
=== Vowels ===
| | Front | | Central | | Back |
|---|---|---|---|---|---|
| Close | i iː | | ɨ | ʉ | u uː |
| Open-mid | ɛ | œ | | | ɔ |
| Open | | | a | | |

=== Consonants ===
| | | Labial | Dental/Alveolar | | Palatal | Velar | | Glottal | |
| | | Labial | plain | sibilant | Palatal | plain | lab. | plain | lab. |
|---|---|---|---|---|---|---|---|---|---|
| Nasal | | m | n | | | (ŋ) | | | |
| Stop/ Affricate | voiceless | p | t | t͡s | t͡ʃ | k | kʷ | ʔ | |
| Stop/ Affricate | voiced | b | d | d͡z | d͡ʒ | ɡ | ɡʷ | | |
| Stop/ Affricate | prenasal | ᵐb | ⁿd | ⁿd͡z | ⁿd͡ʒ | ᵑɡ | ᵑɡʷ | | |
| Stop/ Affricate | implosive | ɓ | ɗ | | | | | | |
| Fricative | voiceless | f | ɬ | s | ʃ | | | h | hʷ |
| Fricative | voiced | v | ɮ | z | ʒ | ɣ | ɣʷ | | |
| Approximant | | | l | | j | | w | | |
| Trill | | | r | | | | | | |

- /ᵑɡ/ is heard as a velar nasal [ŋ] when in word-final position.
