= Mafa people =

Ethnic group in Africa

Mafa
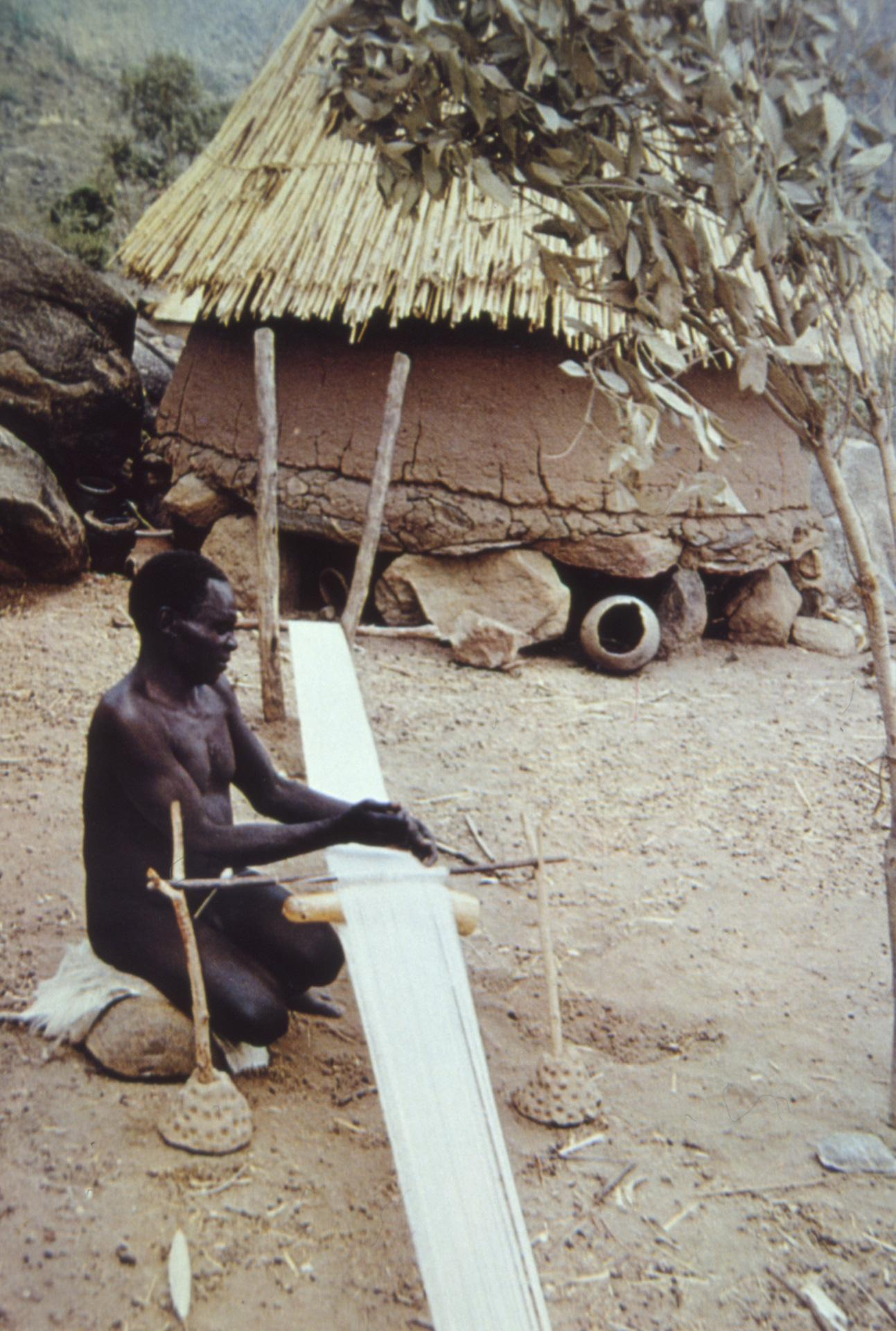
- Mafa weaver of Cameroon, 1992.

Total population
- c. 365,200

Regions with significant populations
- Cameroon: 356,000
- Nigeria: 9,200

Languages
- Mafa

Religion
- Sunni Islam; Christianity; Traditional African religion

The Mafa, natively called Mofa, is an ethnic group localized in northern Cameroon and Nigeria.

== History ==
The Mafahay, a Mafa tribe, migrated from Roua and Sulede (which is west of Durum, Mofu proper), towards the northwest. The Bulahay tribe, meanwhile, migrated to the west, alongside the southern borders of the present Mafa territory. Eventually they also migrated northwards where the two tribes gradually intermixed, becoming the present-day Mafa.

== Demography ==
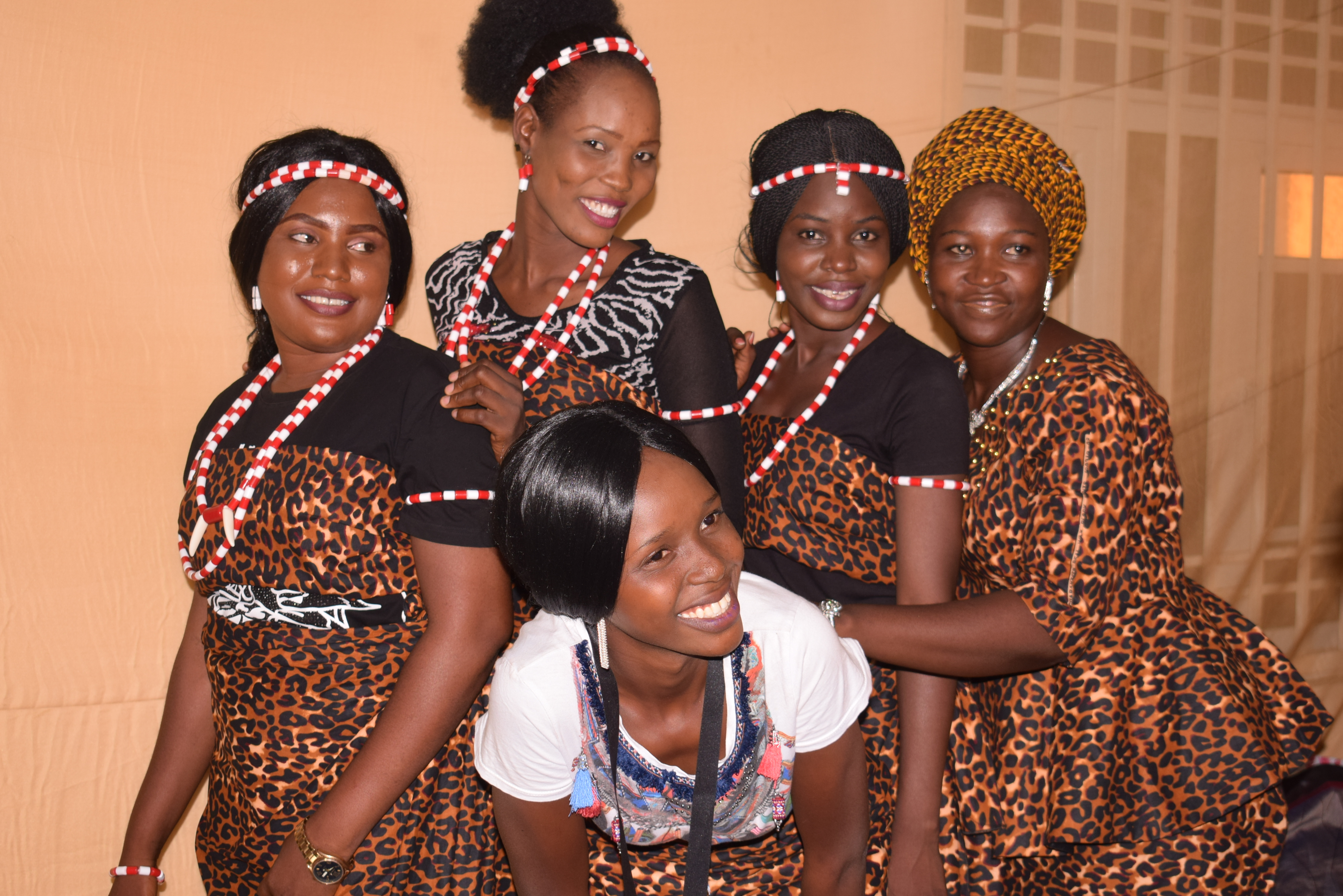
Mafa girls in traditional attire

Total population estimates at 3 065,200. Hallaire indicates that population density in the area is between 99 and 140 inhabitants per square kilometer.

According to Lavergne, the Mafa are split into two tribal sections, being the ‘Mafa proper’ (referred to as Maf-Mafa or ‘Mafahay), and the ‘Bulahai’. The Mafas live in the central part of the Northern Mandaras, which is a region formed by the North area of the Mokolo Plateau and the mountains of northern Mokolo. The Mafa society is divided into several cantons: Moskota; Koza; Gaboua (Koza district); (Mokolo arrondissement).

The Mafa belong to the Chadic language group. They speak the Mafa language, with three different dialects: Central Mafa, West Mafa, and East Mafa. Together with many other languages of other African peoples (such as Mada, Wuzlam (Uldeme), Muyang and Ɗugwor (Dugur)), they form part of the Mafa-south sub-group.

== Agriculture ==
Traditional Mafa agriculture depends on a wide assortment of soil management techniques. The hillsides are secured with constructed terraces, that according to an author, "have reached a state of exceptional perfection". Other ethno-engineering procedures include:

- small-scale irrigation
- canalization
- drainage system

Likewise, agriculturists in the mountains practice an extensive variety of soil fertility management procedures, including:

- crop rotation and mixed cropping
- agro-forestry
- biomass
- nutrient management

They also use an intensive livestock-raising system in the management of the fertility of their soil. Livestock includes smallstock and a limited amount of cattle. In the dry season between December and May, livestock is allowed to roam free, so he can consume crop residues and leaves of wild bushes.

During the farming season, livestock is put in a pen and fed. The manure that accumulates in the stables is collected, preserved and finally spread out in the fields at the end of the dry season. The intensity and ingenuity of Mafa nutrient management is illustrated by the fact that termites are used to digest harvest residues and then fed to the Chickens.

== Mining ==
Alluvial methods of mining were used by Mafa people to search for iron sand and utilize it for magnetite ore in Cameroon.

== Jesus Mafa ==
In the 1970s, the French Catholic priest François Vidil collaborated with the Mafa community to create a series of artwork known as Vie de Jesus Mafa (Life of Jesus Mafa, or simply Jesus Mafa), which depicts various events in the life of Jesus using Black depictions rather than White. These images were actually depictions of real-world recreations of biblical scenes by Mafa people, and have since become popular worldwide, and perhaps especially among African Americans, as an inculturated form of Catholic iconography.

The works were soon after acquired by the Josephites, a religious society of priests serving African Americans. A collection remains at their seminary in Washington, D.C., where their pastoral center continues to sell prints.

The Jesus Mafa collection has also been added to the United States Library of Congress.
