= Psikyɛ dialect =

Afro-Asiatic language of Cameroon and Nigeria

Psikye
- Native to: Cameroon, Nigeria
- Region: Far North Province, Adamawa State
- Ethnicity: Kapsiki
- Native speakers: (52,500 cited 1982–1992)
- Language family: Afro-Asiatic: Chadic; Biu–Mandara; Bura–Higi; Higi (A.3); Kamwe; Psikye

Language codes
- ISO 639-3: kvj
- Glottolog: psik1239

- People: Kapsiki
- Language: Margi

Psikye (Psikya, Kapsiki) is an Afro-Asiatic language spoken in northern Cameroon and eastern Nigeria. Varieties include Psikyɛ and Zləngə. Blench (2006) classifies it as a dialect of Kamwe.

== Names ==
In Cameroon, Psikya speakers use the name Margi to refer to their own language and its three varieties. The prefix ka-, in Kapsiki 'people', marks the plural ethnonym. It is called Higi in Nigeria.

== Dialects ==
Psikyá covers the entire southwestern part of the arrondissement of Mokolo and Mogodé (department of Mayo-Tsanaga, Far North Region, Cameroon) along the Nigerian border, in the settlements of Roumzou, Mogode, and Roumsiki. The Sara people refer to them as Kamu.

Zléŋé and Wula are spoken in only two neighborhoods in the border village of Oula in Cameroon.

== Writing system ==
A Psikyɛ spelling was developed by the Biblical Alliance of Cameroon and is used in the translation of the Bible into Psikyɛ, Ghena ta Shala, published in 1988. This uses several additional letters including in particular ⟨ɓ, ɗ, ə, ɛ, ŋ, ’⟩.

== Notes ==
- van Beek, W. E. A. (2012). The dancing dead : ritual and religion among the Kapsiki/Higi of north Cameroon and northeastern Nigeria. Oxford: Oxford University Press. ISBN 9780199858163.
