= Mokolo =

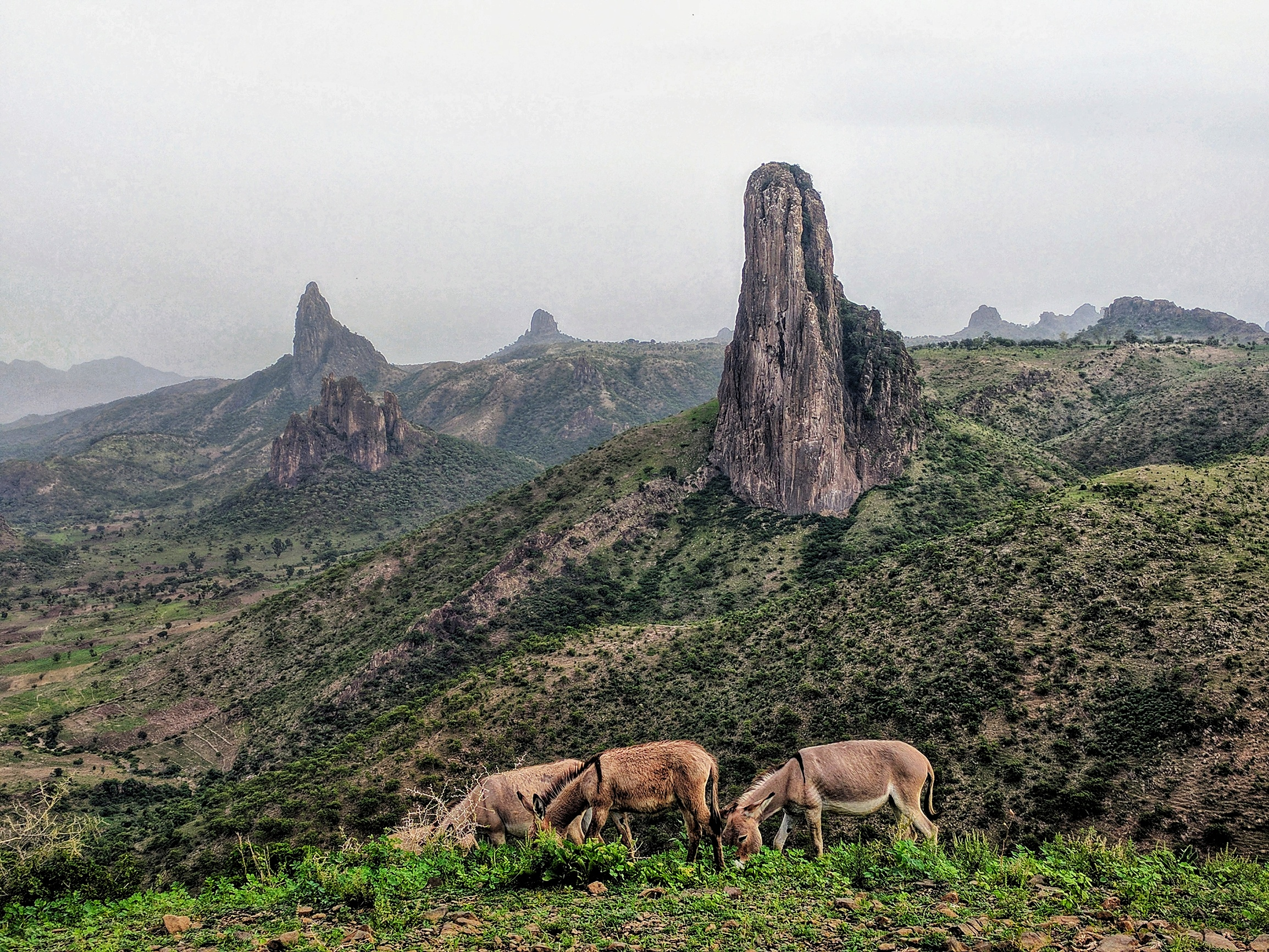
- Rhumsiki

- Location in Cameroon
- Coordinates: 10°44′25″N 13°48′10″E
- Country: Cameroon
- Province: Far North Region
- Division: Mayo-Tsanaga Division
- Elevation: 760 m (2,490 ft)

Population (2012)
  - Total: 40,168

Mokolo is the departmental capital and largest city of the Mayo-Tsanaga department, in the Far North Province of Cameroon. It is the fourth largest city in the Far North Province, after Maroua, Yagoua, and Kousséri. It is located in the Mandara Mountains that run along the Cameroonian-Nigerian border.

== History and Culture ==
The Fulani and Mafa peoples dominate the Mokolo area. Historically, the Mafa were the earlier inhabitants. When the Fulani came through the area, many of the Mafa dispersed into the surrounding Mandara Mountains. The Mafa are also known as the Mafahi.

In 1916 Mokolo was subordinate to Madagali, a Nigerian town, and was ruled from there. Mokolo was centrally located along a well-travelled trade route. The Guiziga and Fulani peoples living near Maroua traded salt and natron with the Mafa living further west, who provided red earth and herbs, used for dyeing cloth.

In roughly 1947 the Muslim Lamido (traditional chief) Idrissou came to power in Mokolo. Idrissou did not wish to manage the affaires of the animist Mafa populations. He appointed one of his subordinates, an Islamized Mafa named Mamoudou, to govern the animists. Mamoudou came to be accepted as the Lamido of the Mafa, and subordinate to Idrissou, who was recognized as Lamido to the Muslim Fulani population. Eventually, the Mafa revolted against paying taxes to both the Lamibé (plural of Lamido). Seemingly under pressure from the French administration of the area, Idrissou was obliged to release Mamoudou from his subordinate position.

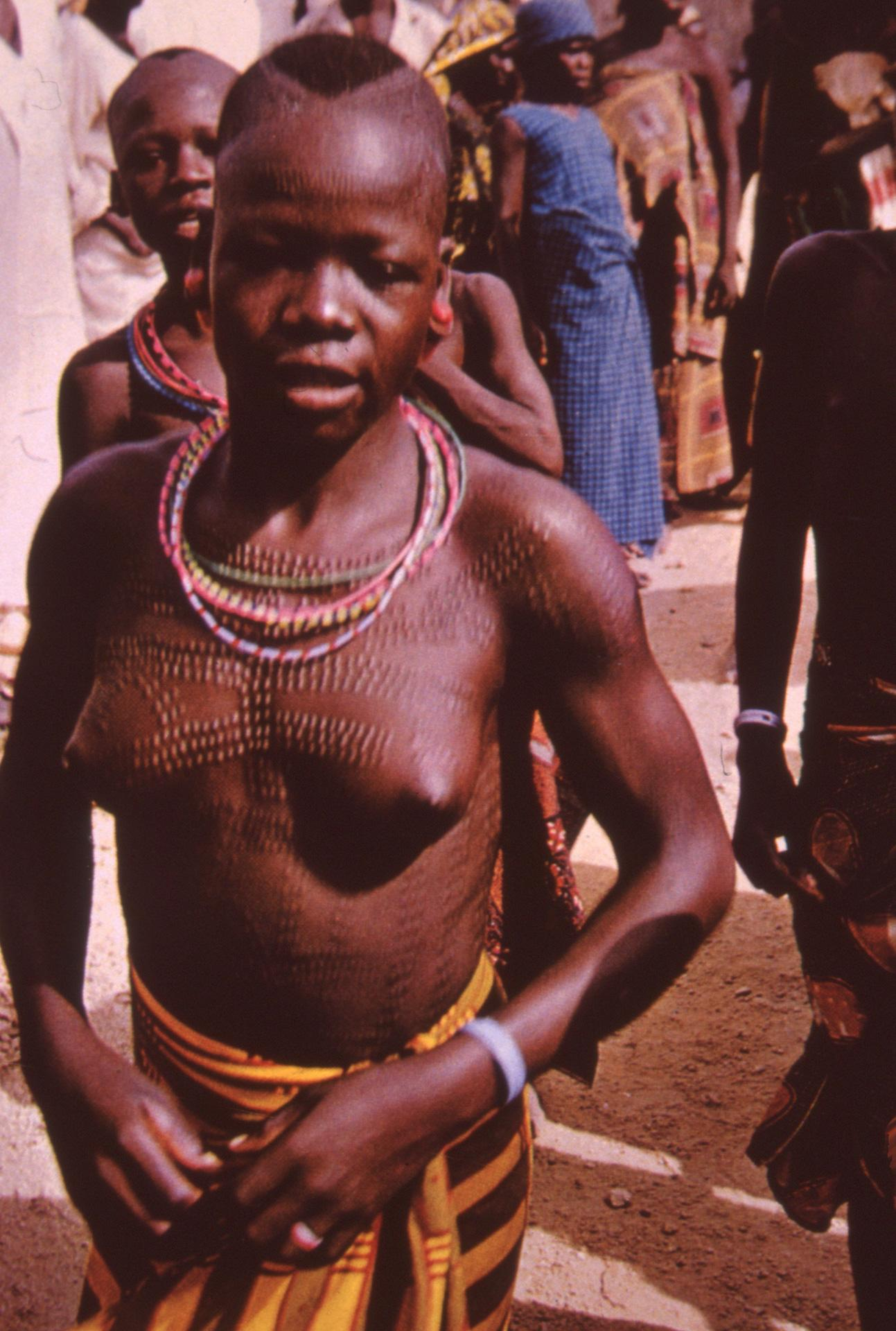
Girl in Mokolo, in 1969

To this day two Lamibé remain in Mokolo, separately but cooperatively serving both the Fulani and Mafa populations. For a small fee, the Lamibé resolve problems and disputes, namely concerning marriages and divorce, inheritances, and some petty theft. The Lamido thus serves as a link between the populations and the government.

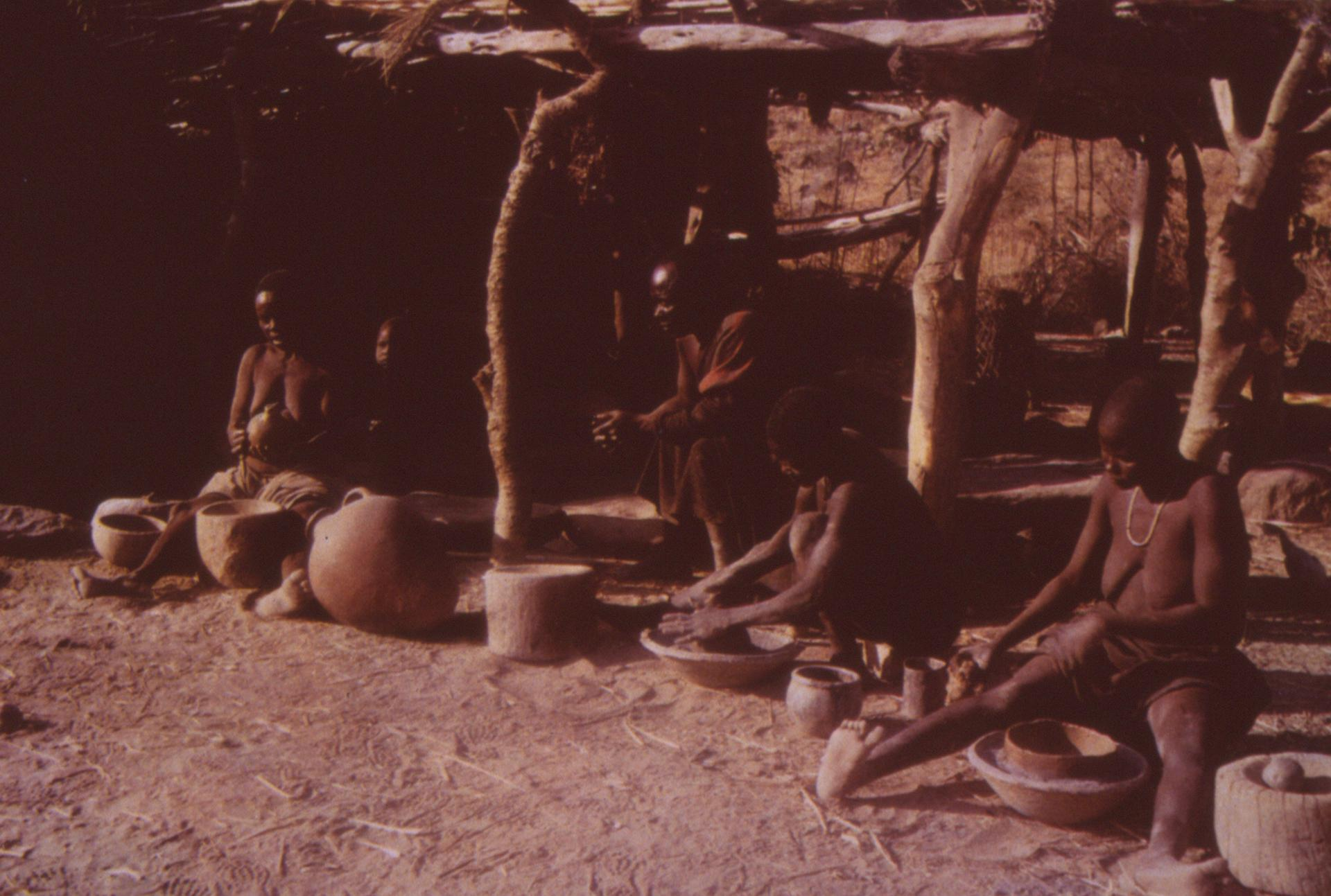
Pottery workshop, in the town of Mokolo

== Population ==
The greater Mokolo area has a population of over 300,000 people. The center of Mokolo is estimated to have a population of 30,000. The Mayo-Tsanaga department is one of the most densely populated departments of Cameroon.

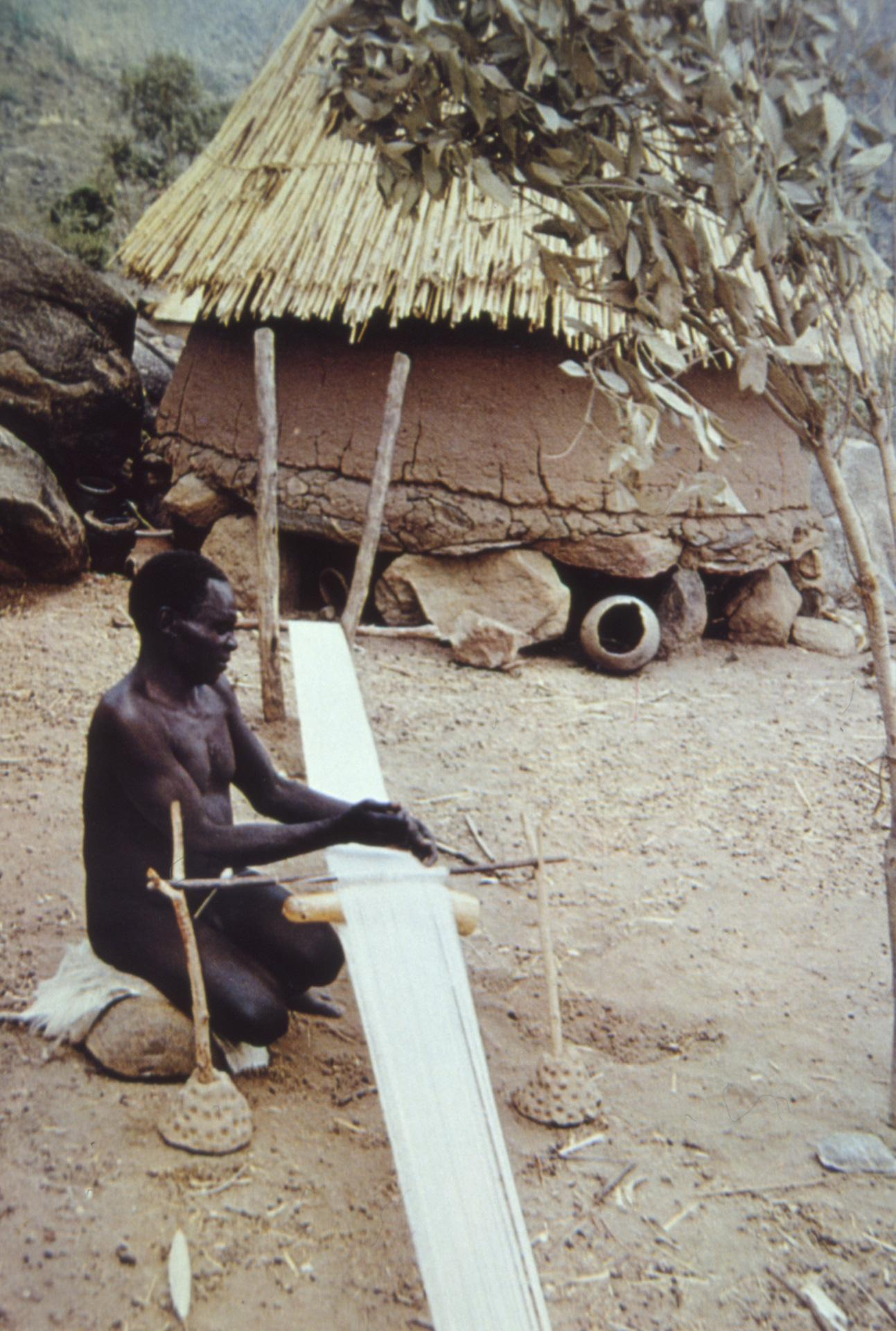
A weaver from the Mafa people of Mokolo

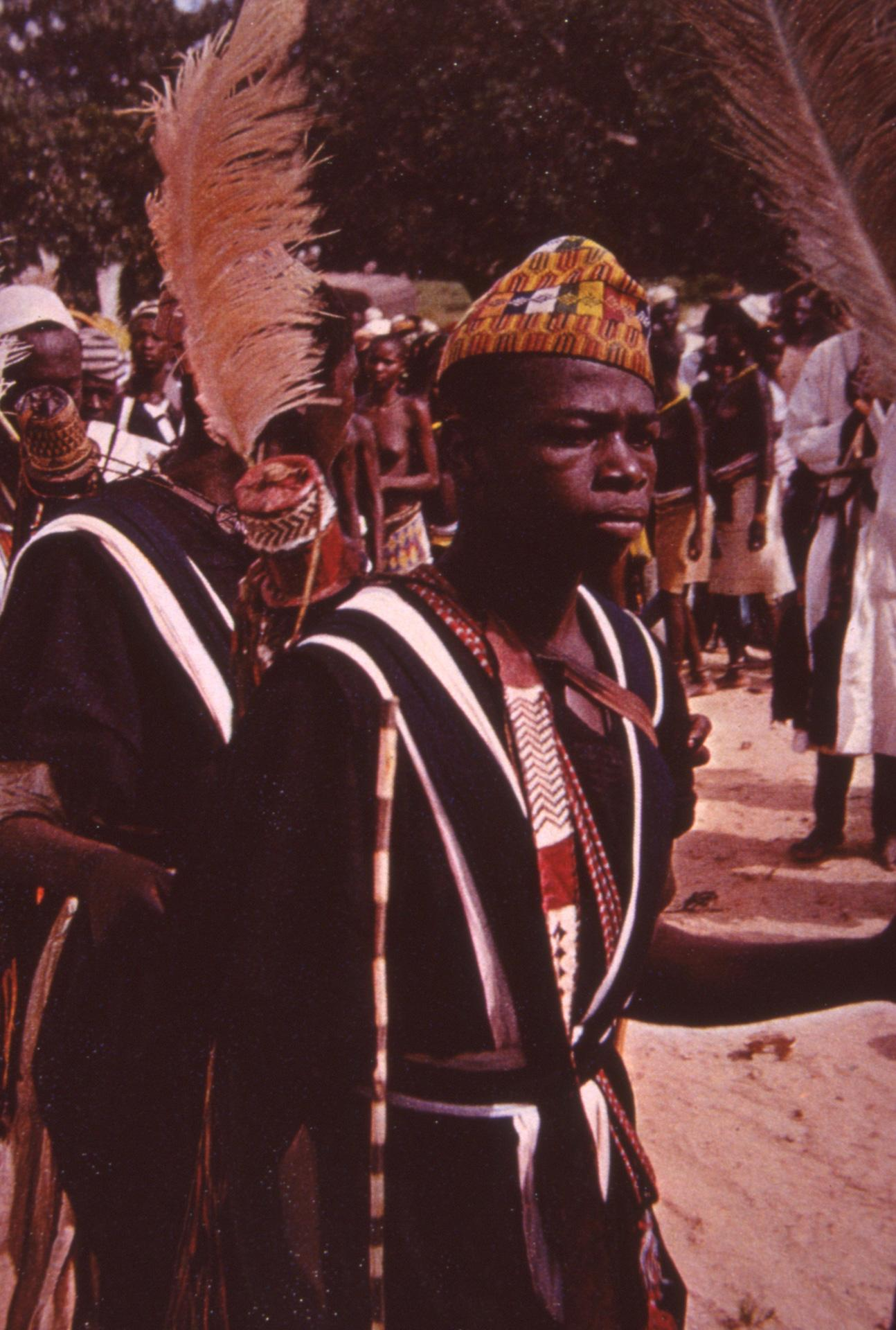
Festive holding of a celebration in Mokolo

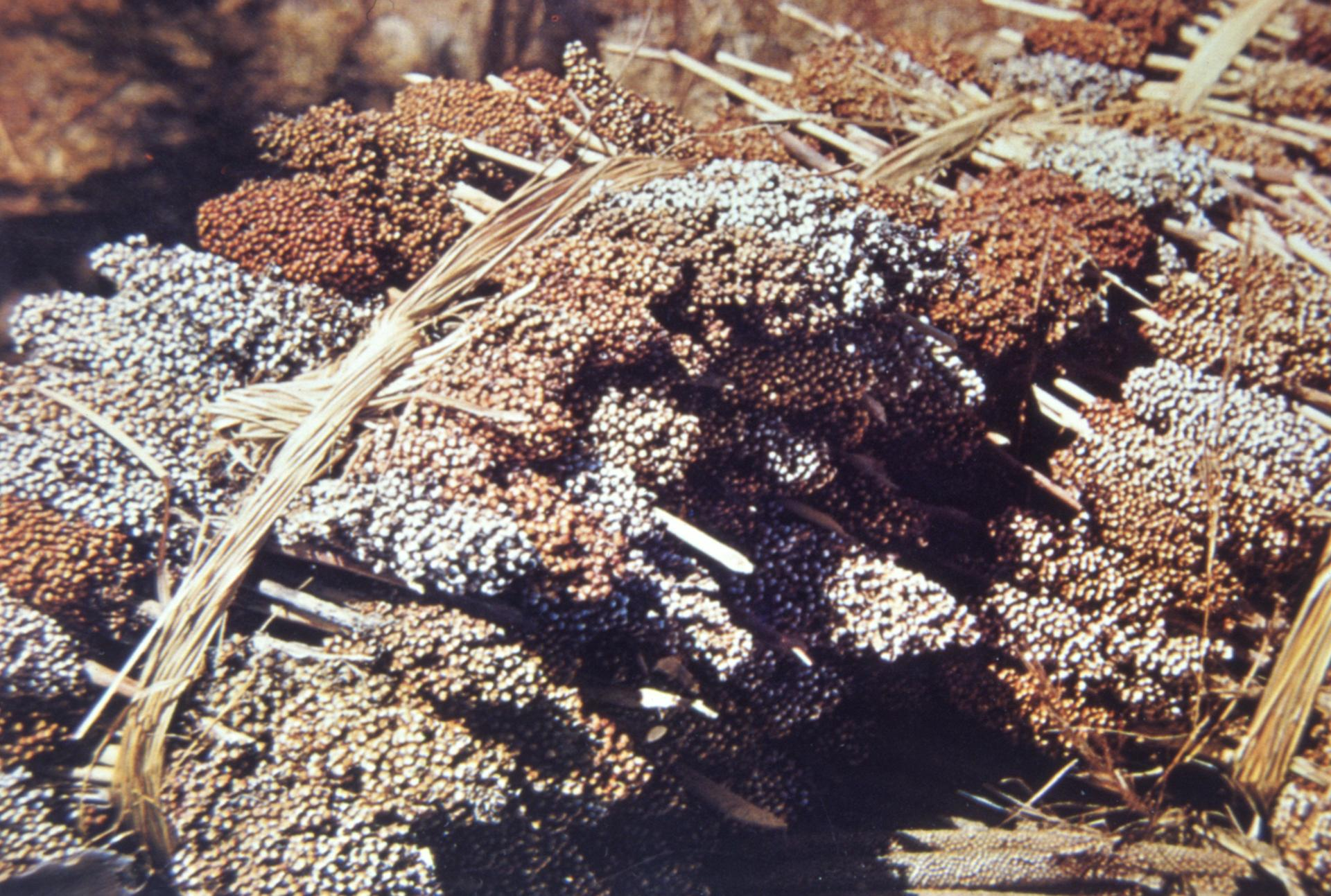
Mokolo sorghum bundles

== Languages ==
Fulfulde, as the lingua franca of the Extreme North Province, is the predominant language spoken throughout the Mokolo area, and is prevalent in the centre of Mokolo. Fulfuldé was brought to the region by the Fulani peoples. Mafa is widely spoken among the Mafa populations throughout Mokolo. To the southwest of Mokolo, in the direction of the town Rumsiki, Kapsiki is the dominant language. French is used by the government and is the language of instruction in government-run schools.

== Religion ==
Among the places of worship, they are predominantly Muslim mosques. There are also Christian churches and temples.

== Climate ==
The climate of Mokolo is typical of the Sahel- tropical dry. A short rainy season lasts from mid-May to August. Harmattan winds blow South from the Sahara during December and January. A dry, hot season lasts from March to May. Hot season temperatures reach roughly 43.3 °C (110 °F). As it is located in the Mandara Mountains at a slightly higher elevation than Maroua, the temperature of Mokolo is usually five to ten degrees cooler than that of Maroua.

== Economy and Services ==
Mokolo has one internet café and two state-recognized financial institutions, the Mutuel Communautaire de Croissance, and a branch of Crédit du Sahel. Mokolo is served by all major Cameroonian cellular telephone services. The weekly market is on Wednesday, where one can find large markets for clothing, dogs and various livestock.

== Agriculture ==
The primary crops grown in and around Mokolo include millets, soy, and peanuts. The majority of soy found in Cameroon comes from the region surrounding Mokolo. The city is known as "the breadbasket of the Mandara Mountains". The Fulbé people are traditionally cattle herders, and cattle raising remains a common and profitable activity. Cotton, of decreasing importance, is cultivated in limited amounts and purchased by SODECOTON.

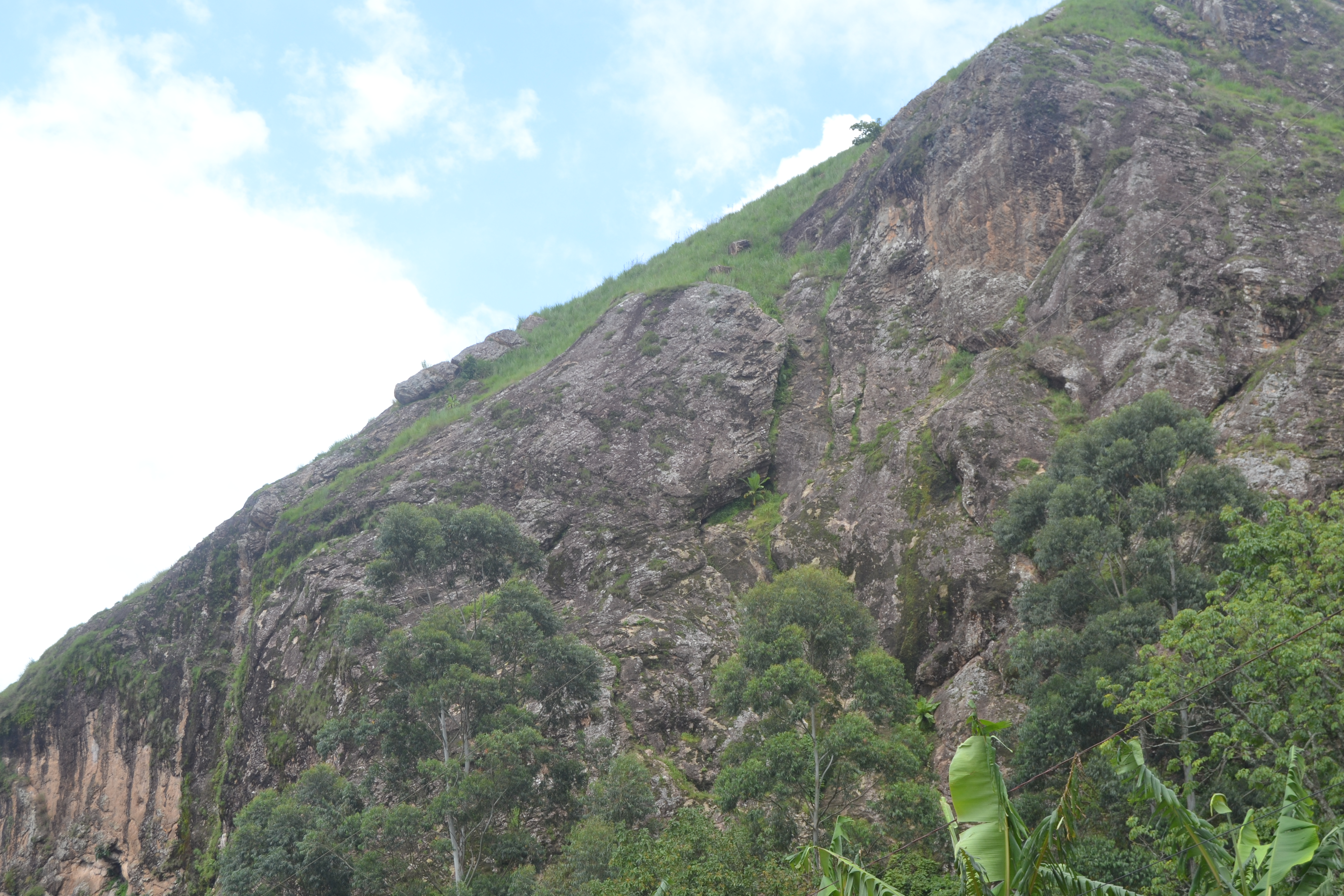
Rhum rock

== Government ==
As Mokolo is the departmental capital, many government ministries maintain delegates there. The current serving Mayor, Damien Zokom, is a member of the RDPC party.

== Education ==
Three public high schools are located in Mokolo, including a bilingual high school and a technical school. A private Protestant high school also operates. Mokolo is host to a teachers’ training college. The Catholic mission operates schools for both the deaf and the blind. Mokolo also boasts a Youth Centre and stadium. Both the Youth Centre, and a Catholic establishment, l’Aumonerie, operate libraries.

== Transportation ==
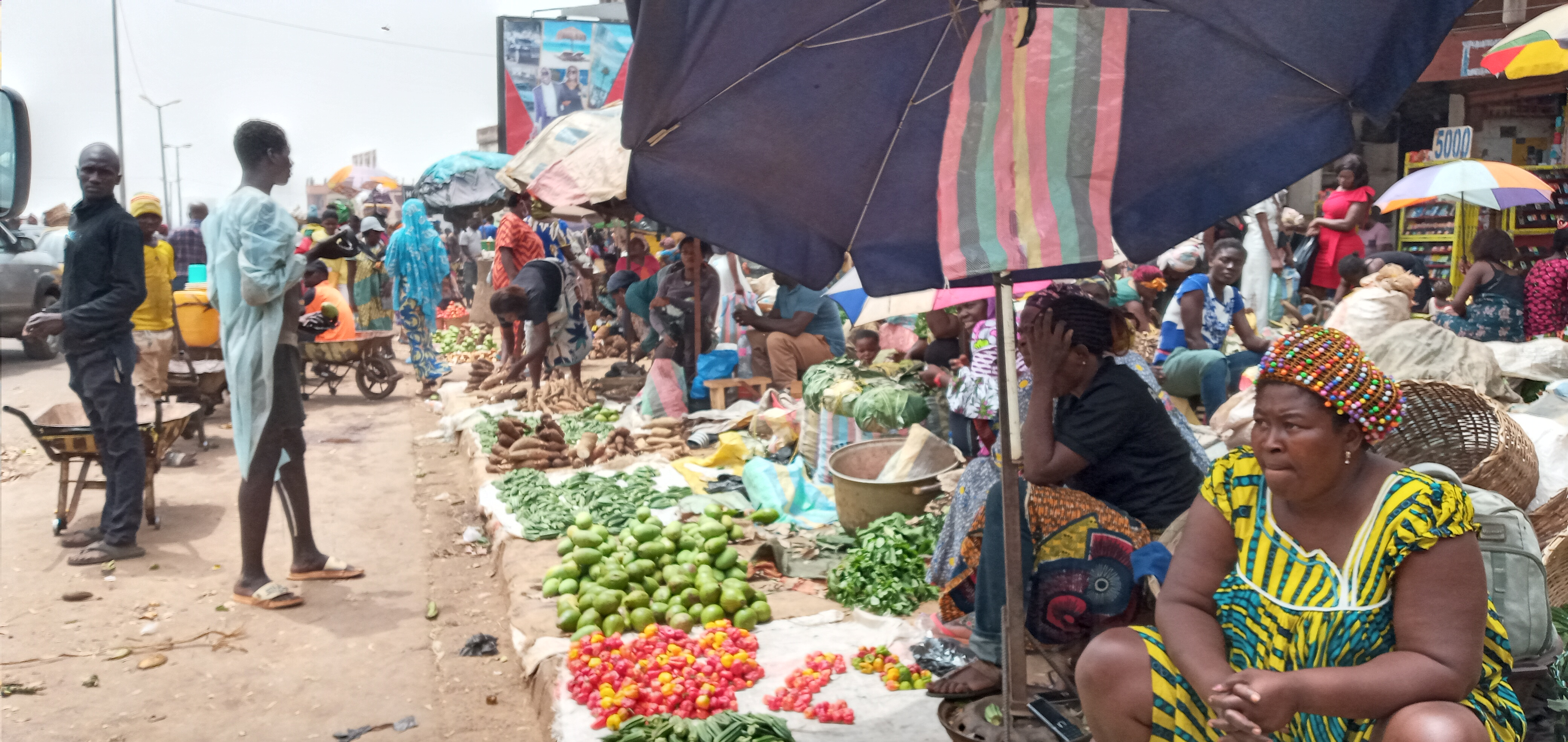
Mokolo market

Mokolo is located on a paved road, 79 km to the west of Maroua, the regional capital. Two bus services, Tsanaga Voyages and Mokolo Express, make regular trips between Maroua and Mokolo. A number of informal bush taxis also offer transport between the two cities. The average travel time is just over an hour, and costs 800 - 1,000 CFA francs ($1.61-$2.01).

The city is at the centre of several tourist destinations, including Tourou and Rhumsiki.
