= Mount Oupay =

Highest mountain in Mandara Mountains, Cameroon

- highest point in the Mandara Mountains
- Location within Cameroon

Highest point
- Elevation: 1,494 m (4,902 ft)
- Coordinates: 10°53′N 13°47′E

Geography
- Parent range: Mandara Mountains

Mount Oupay in Cameroon is the highest point in the Mandara Mountains, with an elevation of 1,494 m (4,902 ft).
