= Mofu =

Mofu is a designation for various ethnic groups and languages they speak in northern Cameroon, near the border with Nigeria. The Mofu groups live in the Mandara Mountains of Cameroon's Far North Province.

Some of these groups accept the name "Mofu", for example the Mofu-Duvangar, Mofu-Durum, Mofu-Wazang, Mofu-Meri, and the Mofu-Gudur. Others do not use the appellation "Mofu". They use just Zulgo, Gemjek, Mbuko, or Moloko. They use those names to refer to themselves and their languages. Most of the groups with the Mofu prefix traditionally refer to themselves as "People of the Mountains" or their language as "Language of the Mountains".

The Mofu languages are separate languages of the Biu–Mandara branch of the Chadic language family.

The Mofu-Wazan was featured in the 2007 documentary Master of the Killer Ants, a Nova program episode.
