= Mandara Mountains =

Mountain range in Nigeria and Cameroon

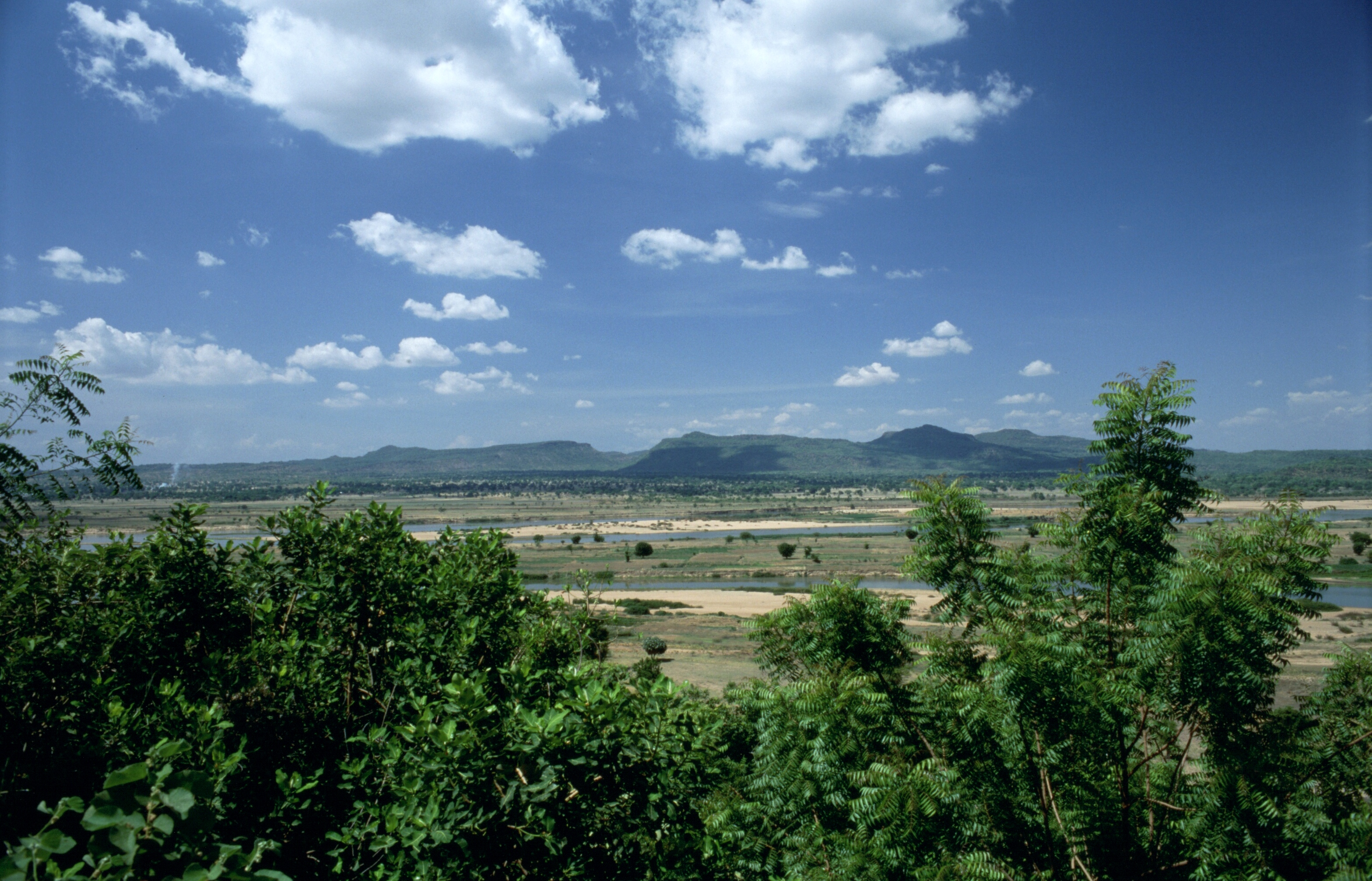
The Mandara Mountains looking north-east from Jimeta/Yola.

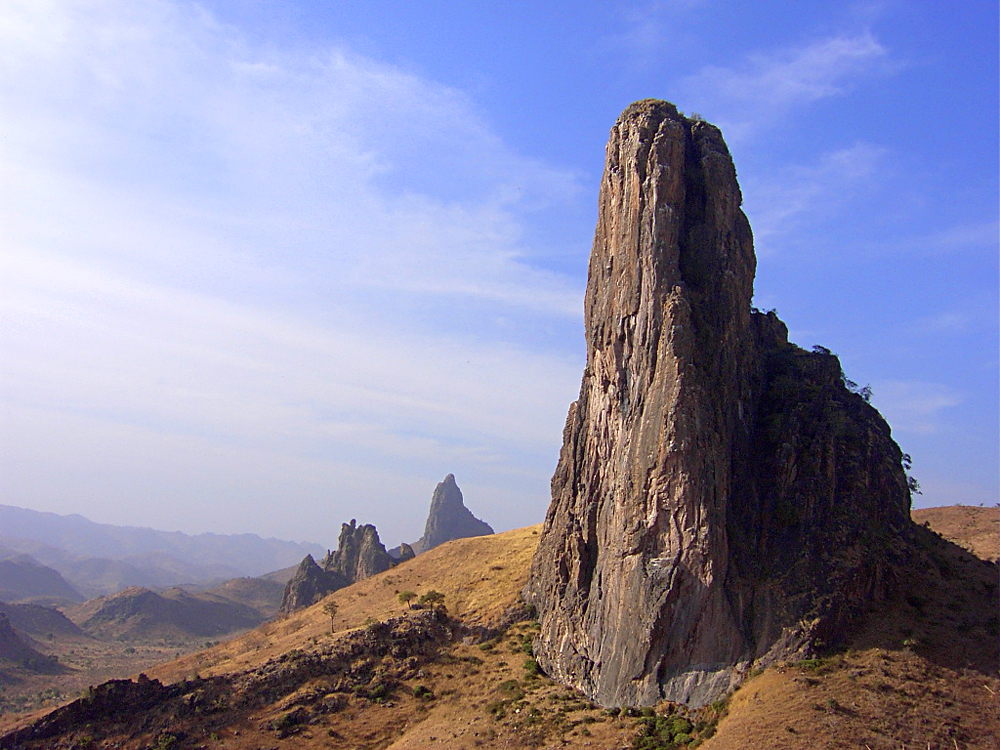
Kapsiki Peak near Rhumsiki is one of the most photographed parts of the Mandara.

The Mandara Mountains are a volcanic range extending about 190 km (about 120 mi) along the northern part of the Cameroon–Nigeria border, from the Benue River in the south (9.3°N 12.8°E) to the north-west of Maroua in the north (11.0°N 13.9°E). The highest elevation is the summit of Mount Oupay, at 1,494 m (4,900 ft) above sea level (10°53′N 13°47′E).

The region is densely populated, mainly by speakers of Chadic languages, including both the Mofu and the Kirdi ethnic groups.

Extensive archaeological research has been undertaken in the Mandara Mountains, including work at Diy-Gid-Biy (DGB) sites.

== Geology ==
The Mandara Mountains were formed millions of years ago when a continental plate of basement rock deep beneath the African continent rose up, fragmenting and splitting as it was pushed to the surface. The climate was significantly wetter in those times, so enormous amounts of precipitation formed numerous rivers that rushed through these fractures, carving them deeper and wider, resulting in the range's notably rugged terrain.

Volcanic activity also played a role in the formation of the range. Eruptions of lava formed volcanic cones whose vents were eventually plugged with hardening magma. These hardened cores are called volcanic plugs. In the case of the Mandara Mountains, the plugs were much more erosion-resistant than the exterior of the cones, which wore away over time. Eventually, only the plugs remained, forming the stark, needle-like spires such as Kapsiki Peak that the range is known for.

Gallery

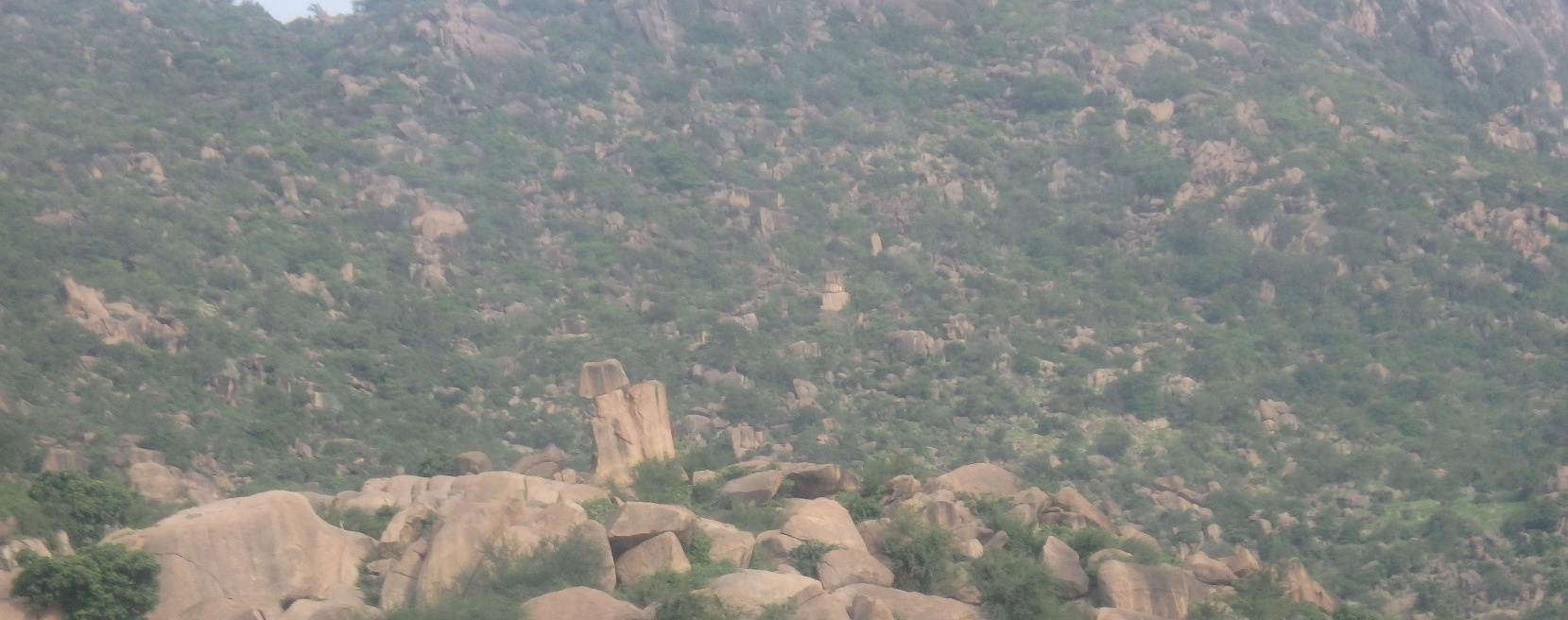
Cross sectional view

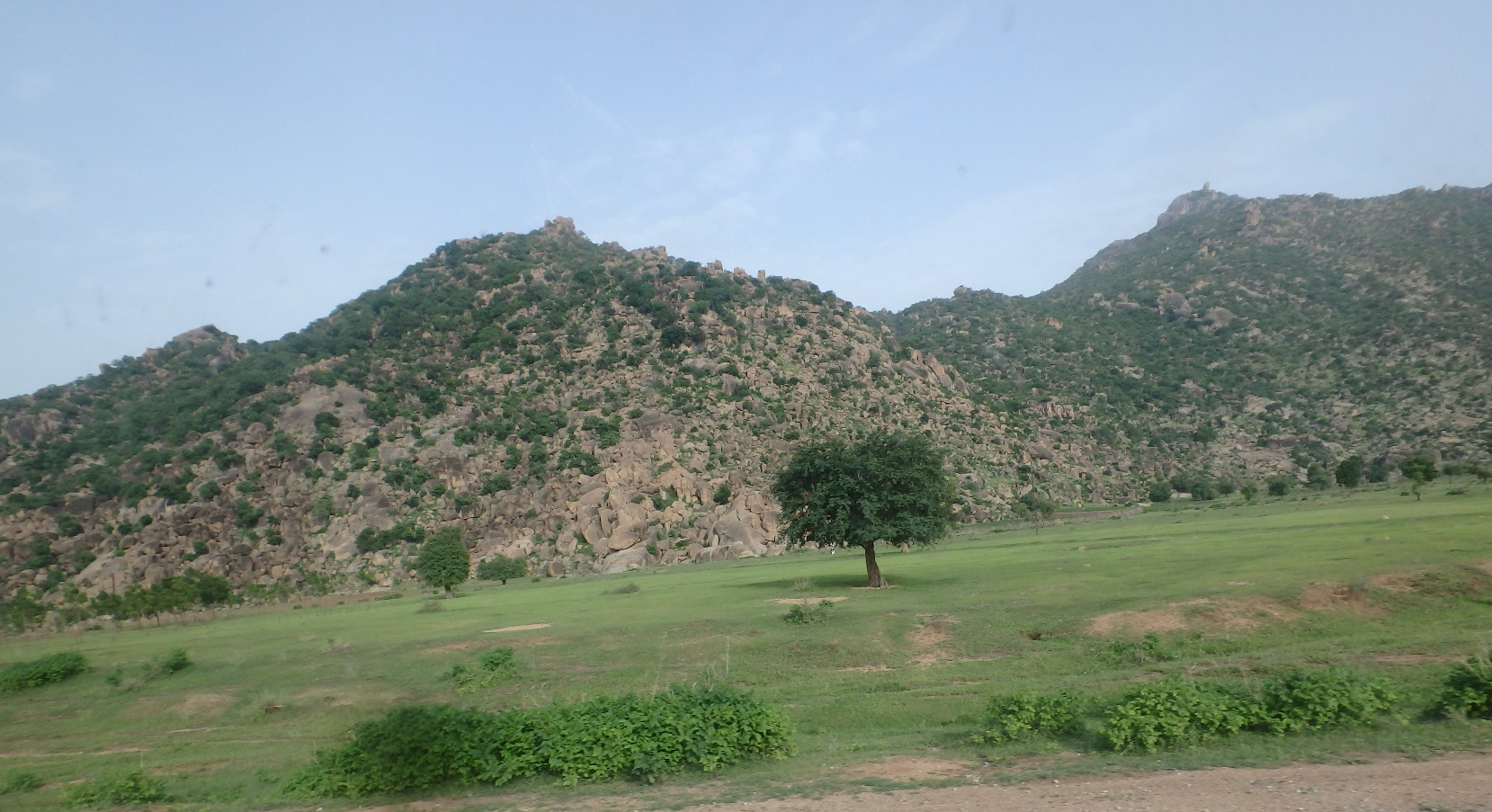
View of small Mountains

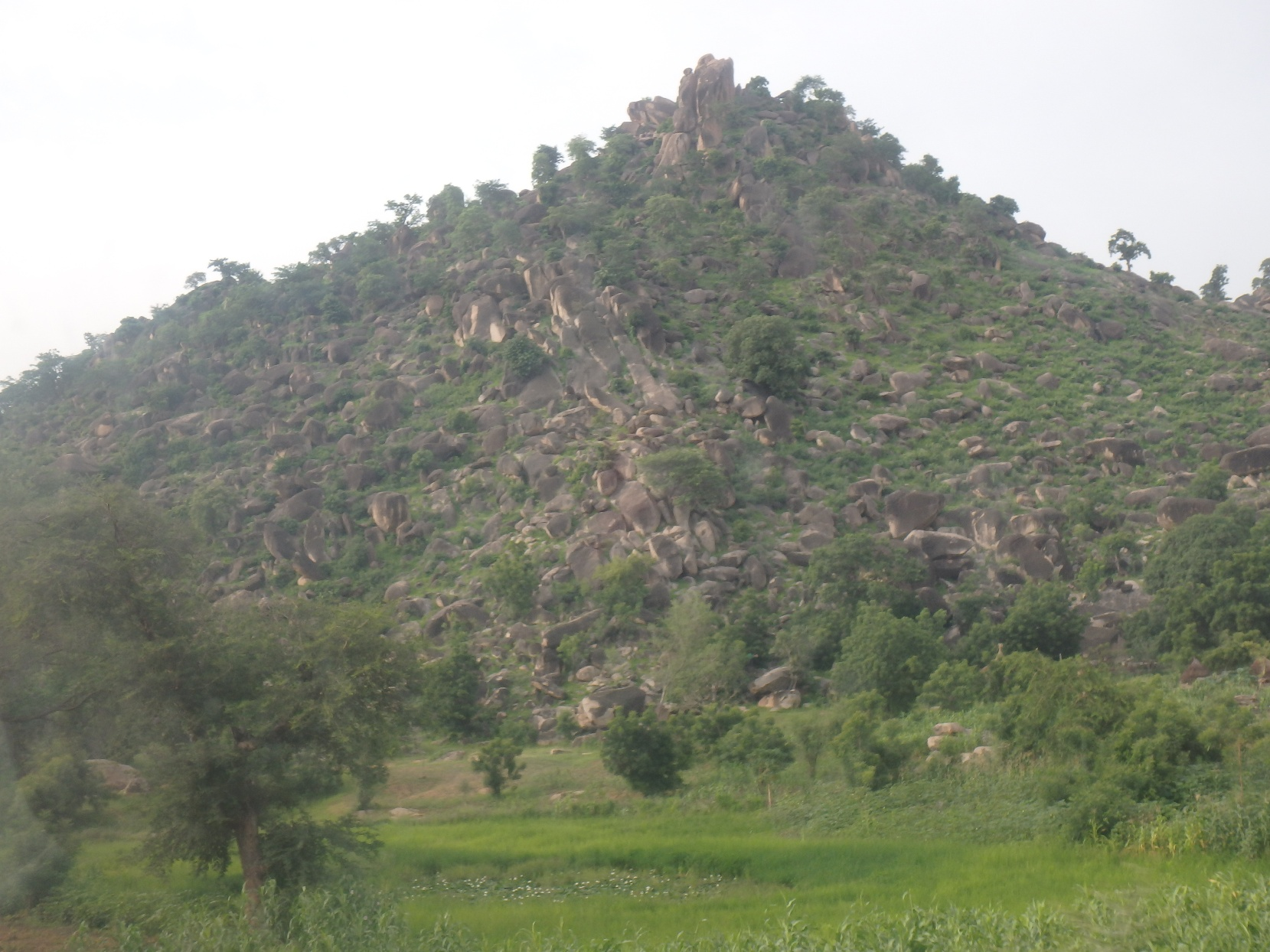
The mountain peak

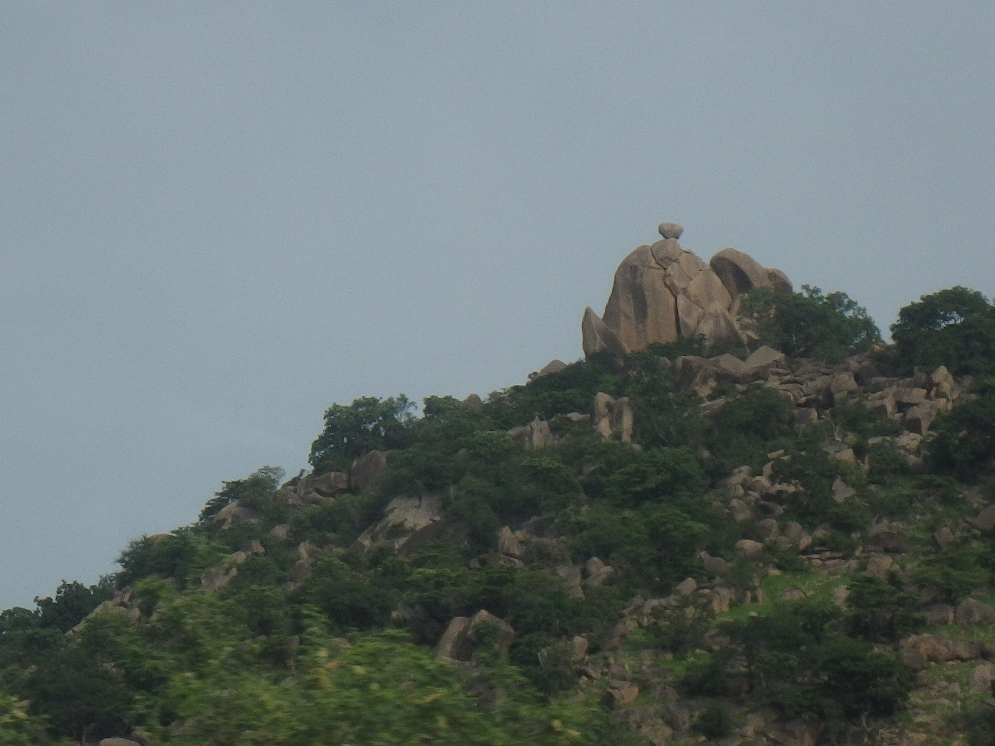
View of a pointed Rock form

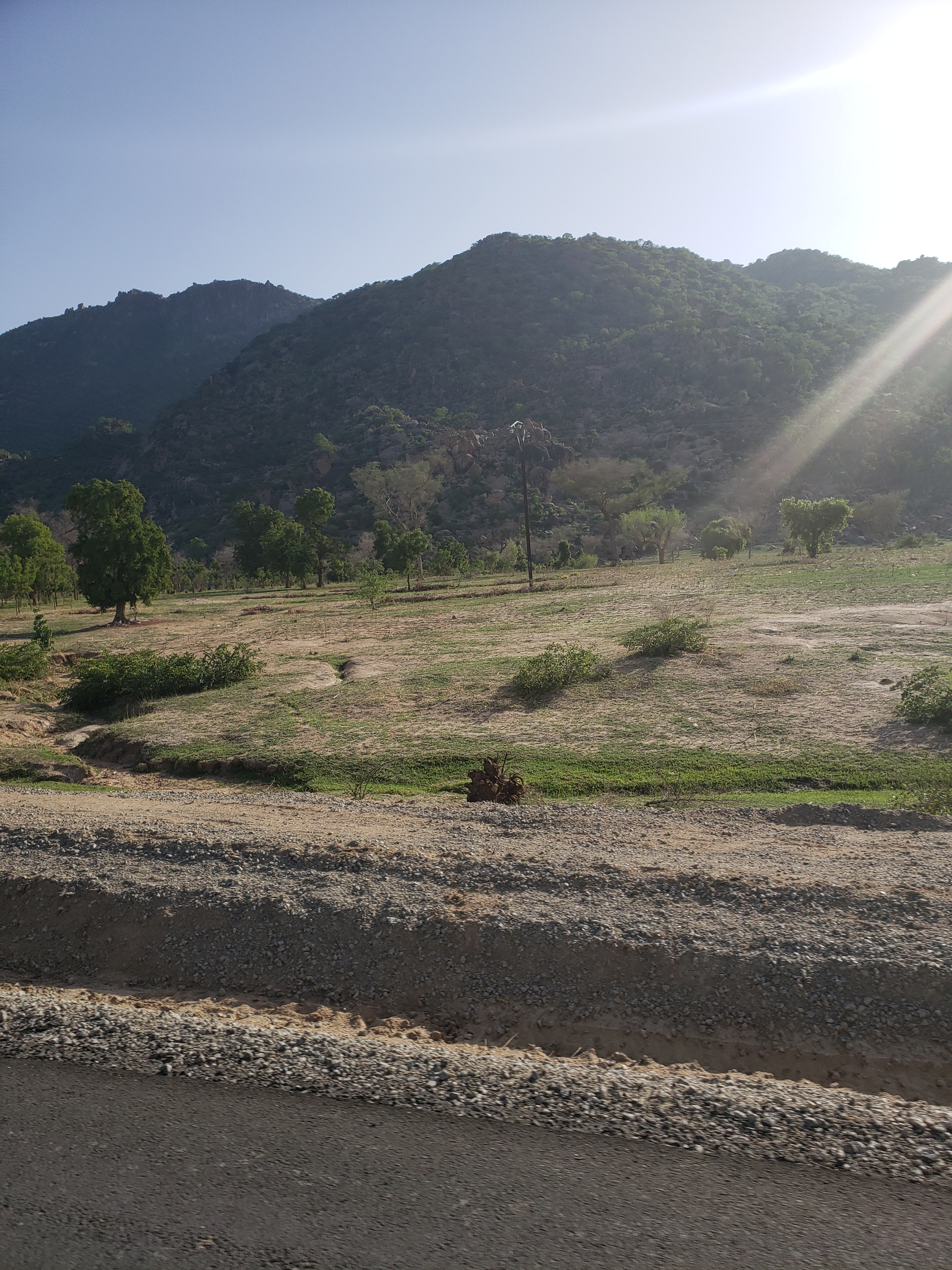
Sunset view

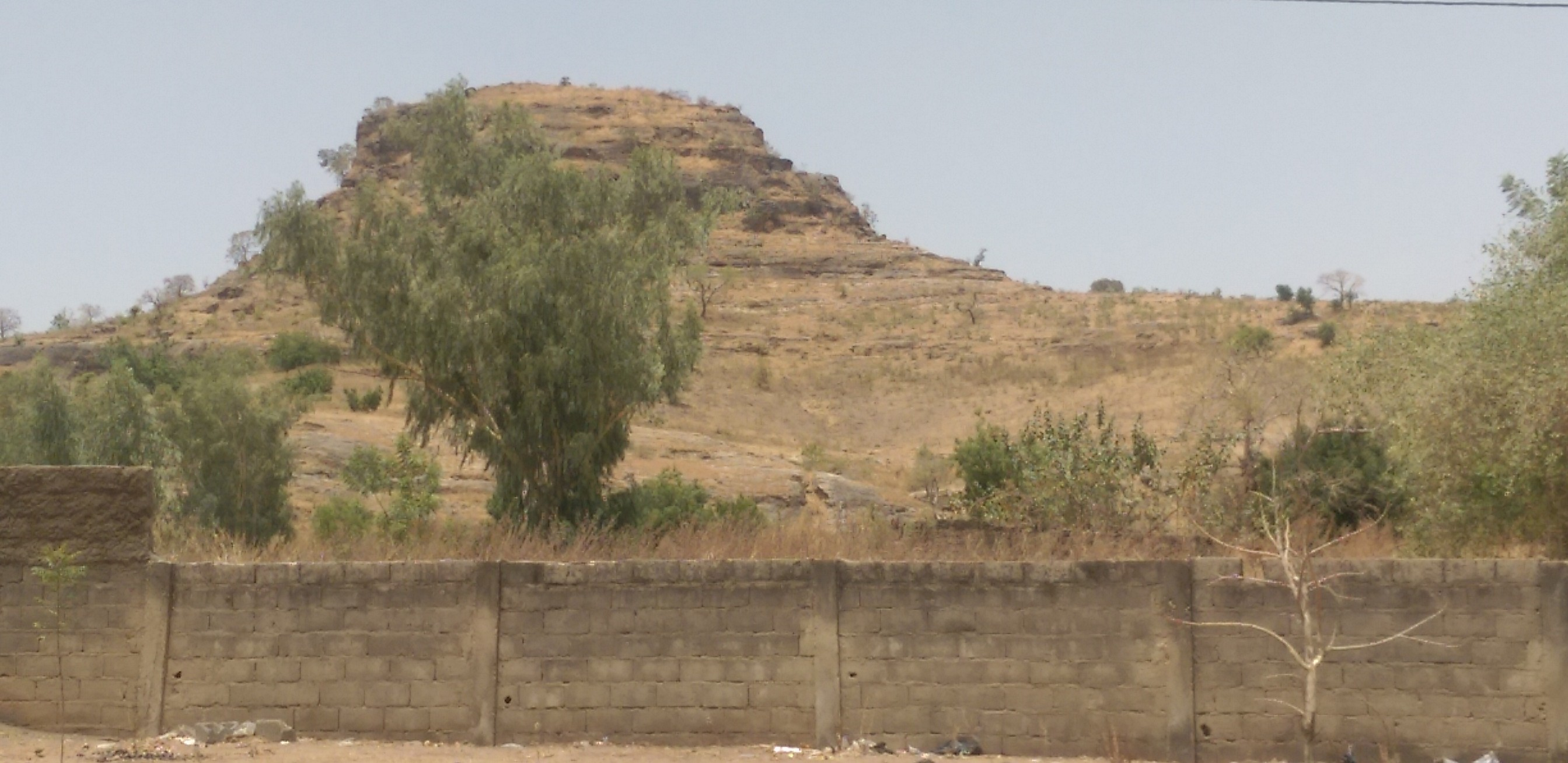

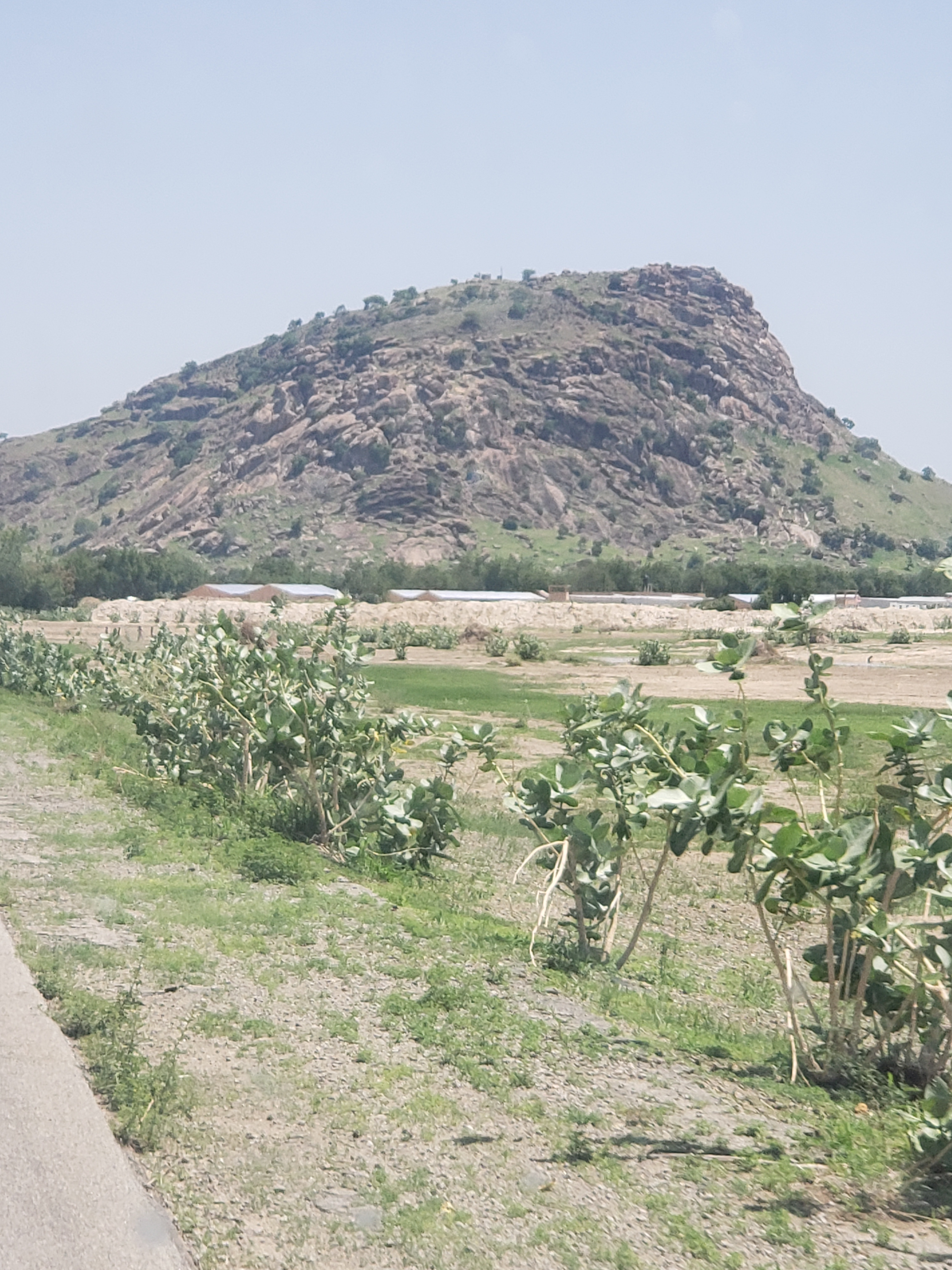

== Climate ==
The ecoregion has a tropical savanna climate, moderated by elevation. The average annual rainfall varies from 800 to 1000 mm depending on location. Most rain falls during the long wet season from May to October, with November to April being the dry season.

== Ecology ==
The higher elevation and rainfall of the mountains sustained plant communities distinct from the surrounding lowlands.

Open woodlands, dominated by the tree Isoberlinia doka, were once the dominant plant community in the ecoregion, In relatively intact woodlands the trees reach 12 to 18 meters high, and tree cover averages 50% or more. Grasses form the understory. The highest-elevation areas, from 1,200 to 1,494 meters elevation, are home to a mix of lowland (Sudanian) and montane and submontane (Afromontane) species, including some rare and endemic plants and reptiles. The vegetation has been profoundly altered by heavy grazing, burning, and conversion to agriculture, and only fragmented and degraded areas of woodland remain.

Mozogo-Gokoro National Park and Mayo-Louti Forest Reserve in Cameroon cover lower-elevation portions of the mountains. The high peaks, which are of the greatest biological interest, are unprotected.

== People ==
The Mandara Mountains sustain a relatively dense population, despite the topography and relatively poor soils. Historically the mountains were a refuge for people resisting conquest or enslavement by states on the surrounding plains, and the mountains sustain a great diversity of languages and traditional religions.

Local people developed a system of intensive agriculture involving the construction of terraces and measures to retain and improve soil fertility. Terraces were built on hillsides to protect soil from erosion and can extend from valleys to the high mountain slopes. Crop rotation between sorghum, millet, and legumes maintains soil fertility and reduces pests. Trees are used for shade, fodder, and green manure. Khaya senegalensis and Acacia albida are the most important, along with about 30 other species. Domestic sheep, goats, and cattle are kept and fed in pens during the crop-growing season, and their manure is deposited on the terraces after each harvest. Domestic animals are allowed to graze on the terraces' plant stubble after harvest to ensure that the manure fertilizes the fields. Household, human, and plant waste is used to improve the soil on terraces.

== See also ==
- Pico Cão Grande
- Tororo Rock
