= Daba language =

Chadic language of Cameroon and Nigeria

Daba
- Native to: Cameroon, Nigeria
- Region: Far North Province; Adamawa State
- Native speakers: 25,000 (2007)
- Language family: Afro-Asiatic: Chadic; Biu–Mandara; Daba languages (A.7); South; Daba
- Dialects: Daba; Mazagway (Musgoy); Nive; Pologozom; Tpala (Kola)

Language codes
- ISO 639-3: dbq
- Glottolog: nucl1683
- ELP: Daba

Daba (also known as Dabba) is a Chadic dialect cluster spoken in Cameroon in Far North Province and in one village in neighboring Nigeria. Blench (2006) considers Mazagway to be a dialect.

Daba is spoken throughout the northern part of the Mayo-Louti department in the Northern Region (in Mayo-Oulo commune), extending slightly into Mayo-Tsanaga Department (in Hina and Bourrha communes) and Diamaré Department (Ndoukoula commune in the Far North Region). Daba (Kanakana), the most western variety that is isolated from the rest of the dialects, is spoken in Douroum, in the northern part of the Mayo-Oulo commune and in the Garoua Daba area (enclave of Hina commune) and in Bourrha commune. Tpala, in the northeast, is spoken in the Ndoukoula area.

== Documentation and Resources ==
Efforts have been made to record and save the Daba language, which include the creation of a dictionary that translates between Daba, French, and Fulfulde. The purpose of this glossary is to aid both native speakers and language learners. This initiative is a component of a broader endeavor aimed at recording and cataloging languages spoken by minority groups. The primary objective is to create accessible educational and preservation materials.

== Language Status ==
The Daba language is classified as vulnerable. This status suggests that the language is still in use, but it is confronted with obstacles that could potentially jeopardize its continued existence. These challenges may encompass the influence of more dominant languages, such as French and Fulfulde, and socio-economic changes that promote the adoption of other languages.
