= Kosa =

Kosa may refer to:

== Places ==
- Kosa, Azerbaijan
- Kosa, Croatia, a village in Croatia
- Kōsa, Kumamoto, a town in Japan
- Kosa, Russia, several places with the name in Russia
- Kosa, Ukraine, a village in Bolhrad Raion, Ukraine

== People ==
- Kosa (surname)
- Kósa, Hungarian surname
- Kóša, Slovak surname
- Kōsa (1543–1592), Japanese religious leader
- Kosa (Maoist) (died 2025), Indian guerrilla communist
- Kosa Lek (1632–1683), Siamese trader, military general and minister
- Kosa Pan (1633–1699), Siamese diplomat and minister

== Other uses ==
- Kosa (folklore)
- Kosa (river), a river in Perm Krai, Russia
- Kosa (sports manufacturer), Swedish sports equipment manufacturer
- KOSA-TV, a television station
- KOSA, campus radio station of Oakland School for the Arts in Oakland, California, U.S.
- Former call sign of KOZA (Texas), a radio station in Odessa, Texas, U.S.
- Kosa language, a variety of Lunda
- Kosa phenomenon, a sandstorm
- Kosa, a vila in Serbian-Slavic mythology
- Kosha or Kosa, a sheath or layer of the atman or soul according to Vedantic philosophy
- Kids Online Safety Act, a proposed bill in the US Congress
- Tussar silk, called "Kosa" in Sanskrit
- Asian Dust, East Asian meteorological phenomenon

== See also ==
- Khosa (disambiguation)
- Kossa (disambiguation)
- Koza (disambiguation)
- Xhosa (disambiguation),
- Kos (disambiguation)
- Cosa
