= Khosa =

Khosa may refer to:

== People ==
- Asif Saeed Khan Khosa, Chief Justice of the Supreme Court of Pakistan since 31 December 2016
- Baldev Khosa, Indian film actor and politician
- Muhammad Muqeem Khan Khosa (1949–2016), Pakistani politician and MNA
- Dost Muhammad Khosa (born 1973), former Muslim League politician, now Pakistan People's Party
- Mir Hazar Khan Khosa (1929–2021), Chief Justice of the Federal Shariat Court of Pakistan
- Rajan Khosa, Indian filmmaker
- Sukhvir Singh Khosa, Indian immigrant to Canada, litigant in Canada (Minister of Citizenship and Immigration) v Khosa
- Zulfiqar Ali Khosa (born 1935), former Governor of Punjab and chief of khosa tribe
- Latif Khosa, Governor of Punjab
- Muhammad Saif-ud-Din Khosa, former member of the Provincial Assembly of the Punjab
- Sardar Muhammad Mohiuddin Khosa, former member of the Provincial Assembly of the Punjab

== Places ==
- Khosa, Punjab, Pakistan
- Khosa, Shahkot, Punjab State, India
- Jamaitgarh Alias Khosa, Punjab, India

== Other uses ==
- Khosa (tribe), a Baloch tribe

== See also ==
- Khas people, an Indo-Aryan ethno-linguistic group
- Khasas, an ancient Indo-Aryan tribe and a late Janapada kingdom
- Kosa (disambiguation)
- Khoshya, a gotra of Ahirs of Rajasthan and Haryana in India
- Xhosa (disambiguation)
- Xosa (disambiguation)
