= Mazagway language =

Chadic language spoken in Cameroon

Mazagway
- Native to: Cameroon
- Region: North Province, Far North Province
- Native speakers: 35,000 (2005)
- Language family: Afro-Asiatic: Chadic; Biu–Mandara; Daba languages (A.7); Daba; Mazagway
- Dialects: Kpala (Kola); Mazagway (Musgoi)

Language codes
- ISO 639-3: dkx
- Glottolog: maza1304

Mazagway (Musgoy; also known as Mazagway-Hidi) is a Chadic language spoken in Cameroon, in North Province and Far North Province. Blench (2006) classifies it as a dialect of Daba.

Mazagway or Mazagway Hidi is spoken in the Mousgoy region in the northern part of Guider commune (Mayo-Louti department, North Region) and in the south of the commune of Hina (Mayo-Tsanaga, Far North Region). It is closely related to Daba, which was formerly considered to be a dialect of Mazagway.
