= Kosa (surname) =

Kosa is a surname with multiple origins. Notable people with the surname include:

- Emil Kosa Jr. (1903–1968), American artist
- Muchaki Kosa, Indian politician

== See also ==
- Kósa, Hungarian surname
- Kóša, Slovak surname
