= Karl Henke =

Karl Henke may refer to:

- Karl Henke (general) (1896–1945), German army officer
- Karl Henke (American football) (1945–2025), American football player
