= Hausa =

Hausa may refer to:

- Hausa people, an ethnic group of West Africa
- Hausa language, spoken in West Africa
- Hausa Kingdoms, a historical collection of Hausa city-states
- Hausa (horse) or Dongola horse, an African breed of riding horse

== See also ==
- Hausa music, the music of the Hausa people
- Kannywood or Hausa movies, the Hausa-language film industry of Northern Nigeria
- Xhosa (disambiguation)
