= Ciężkowice (disambiguation) =

Ciężkowice may refer to the following places:

- Ciężkowice in Lesser Poland Voivodeship (south Poland)
- Ciężkowice, Łódź Voivodeship (central Poland)
- Ciężkowice, Opole Voivodeship (south-west Poland)
