= Koza =

Koza may refer to:

== Places ==
=== Japan ===
- Koza, Wakayama, a former town
- Kōza District, Kanagawa, a district
- Koza Station, a railway station in Kushimoto, Wakayama Prefecture
- Koza, a former name of Okinawa (city)

=== Other places ===
- Koza, Cameroon, a commune
- Koza, Opole Voivodeship, a village in Poland
- Koza Han, a historic caravanserai (han) in Turkey

== People ==
- Casimir Koza (1935–2010), French footballer
- Dave Koza (born 1954), American baseball player
- John Koza, 20th-century computer scientist and genetic programming pioneer
- Luxolo Koza (born 1994), South African rugby union player
- Paballo Koza (born 2002), South African actor

== Other ==
- Koza (bagpipe), a type of Polish bagpipe
- Koza (film), a 2015 Slovak film
- KOZA (FM), an American radio station
- KOZA (Texas), a defunct American radio station
