= DKX =

DKX or dkx may refer to:

- DKX, the FAA LID code for Knoxville Downtown Island Airport, Tennessee, United States
- dkx, the ISO 639-3 code for Mazagway language, Cameroon
