= Xosa =

Xosa most commonly refers to:

- Xhosa people, a nation, and ethnic group, who live in south-central and southeasterly region of South Africa
- Xhosa language, one of the 11 official languages of South Africa, principally spoken by the Xhosa people
- 1506 Xosa, a stony asteroid
- Xosa (bug), a genus of true bugs

== See also ==
- Xhosa (disambiguation)
- Khosa (disambiguation)
- Kosa (disambiguation)
