= Połowa =

Połowa Puhlau
- Village
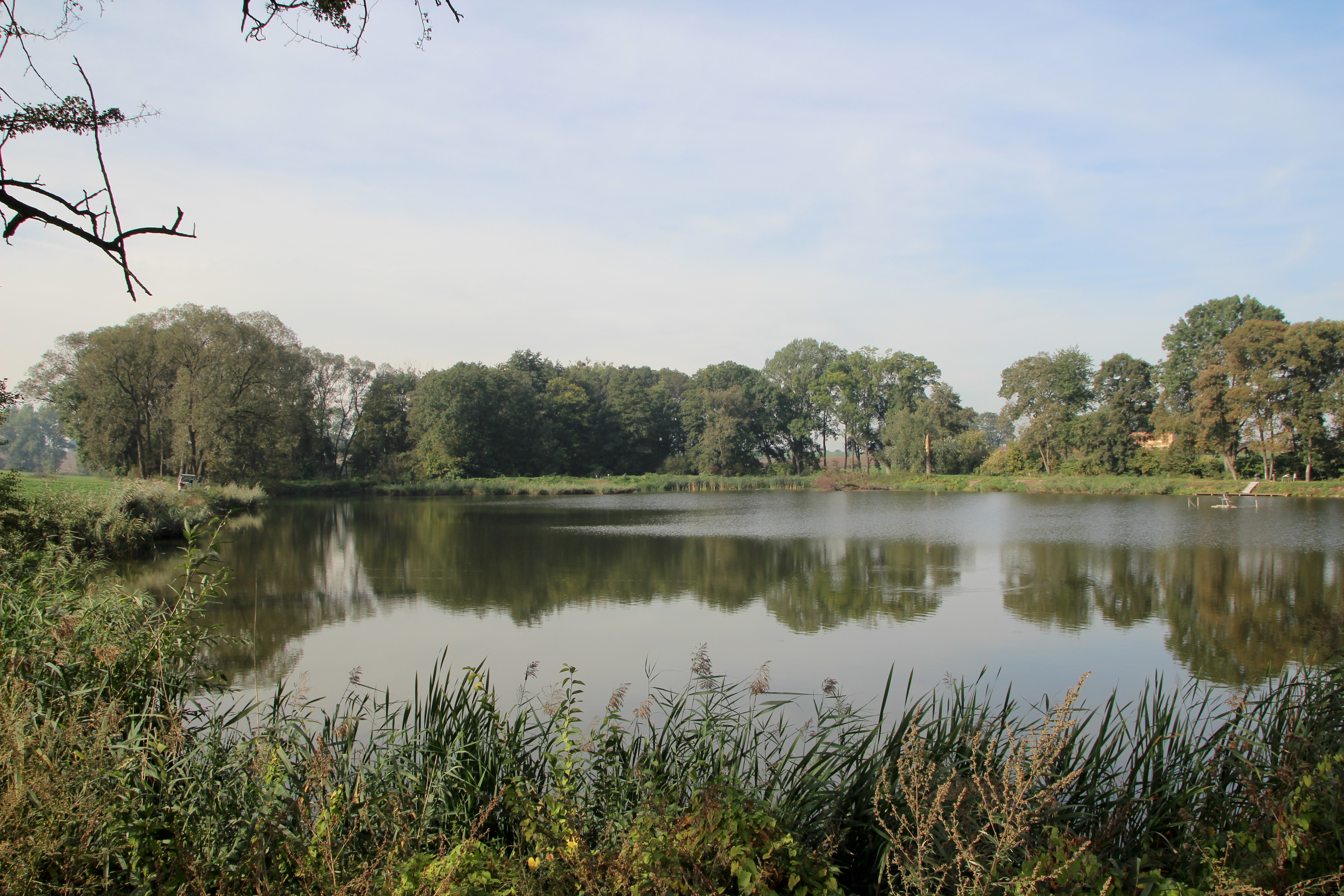

- Location within Poland
- Coordinates: 50°14′N 18°6′E
- Country: Poland
- Voivodeship: Opole
- County: Kędzierzyn-Koźle
- Gmina: Polska Cerekiew

Population
  - Total: 66
- Time zone: UTC+1 (CET)
  - Summer (DST): UTC+2 (CEST)
- Vehicle registration: OK

Połowa ([pɔˈwɔva], additional name in German: Puhlau) is a village in the administrative district of Gmina Polska Cerekiew, within Kędzierzyn-Koźle County, Opole Voivodeship, in southern Poland.
