= Mogodé =

Coordinates: 10.606°N 13.570°E

Mogodé is a commune in Mayo-Tsanaga Department, Cameroon. In 2005, the population was measured at 112.905 people.

== Gallery ==
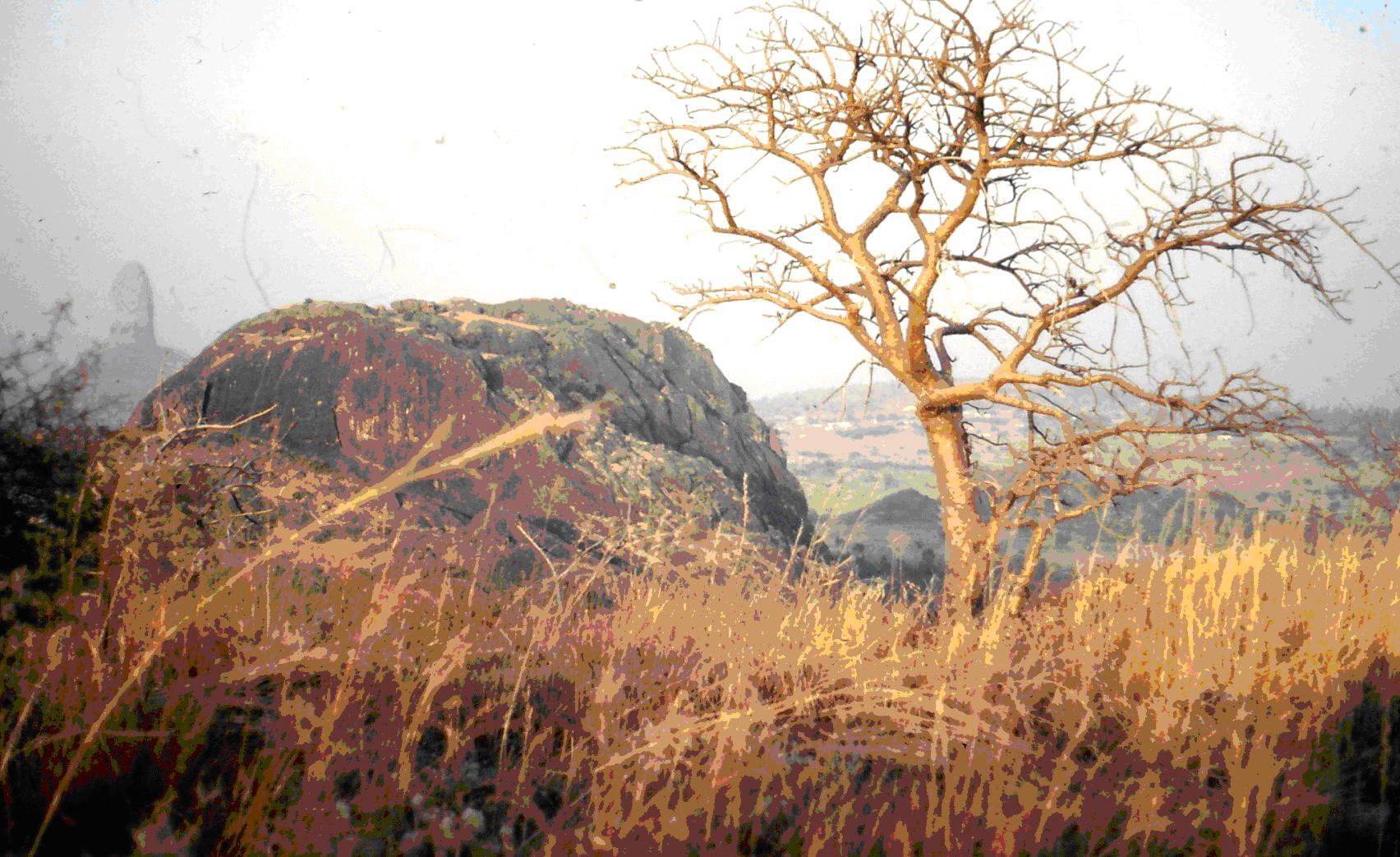
The sacred mountain of Mogode, place of the primordial habitation. Kapsiki

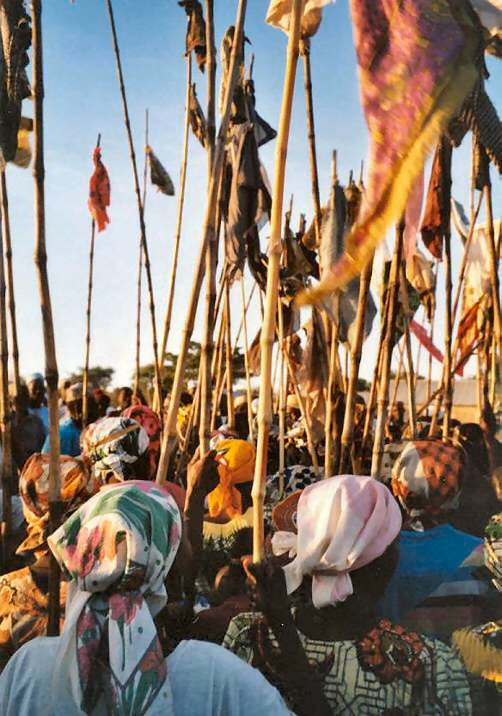
The women at the yearly festival in Mogodé, Kapsiki (Cameroon)

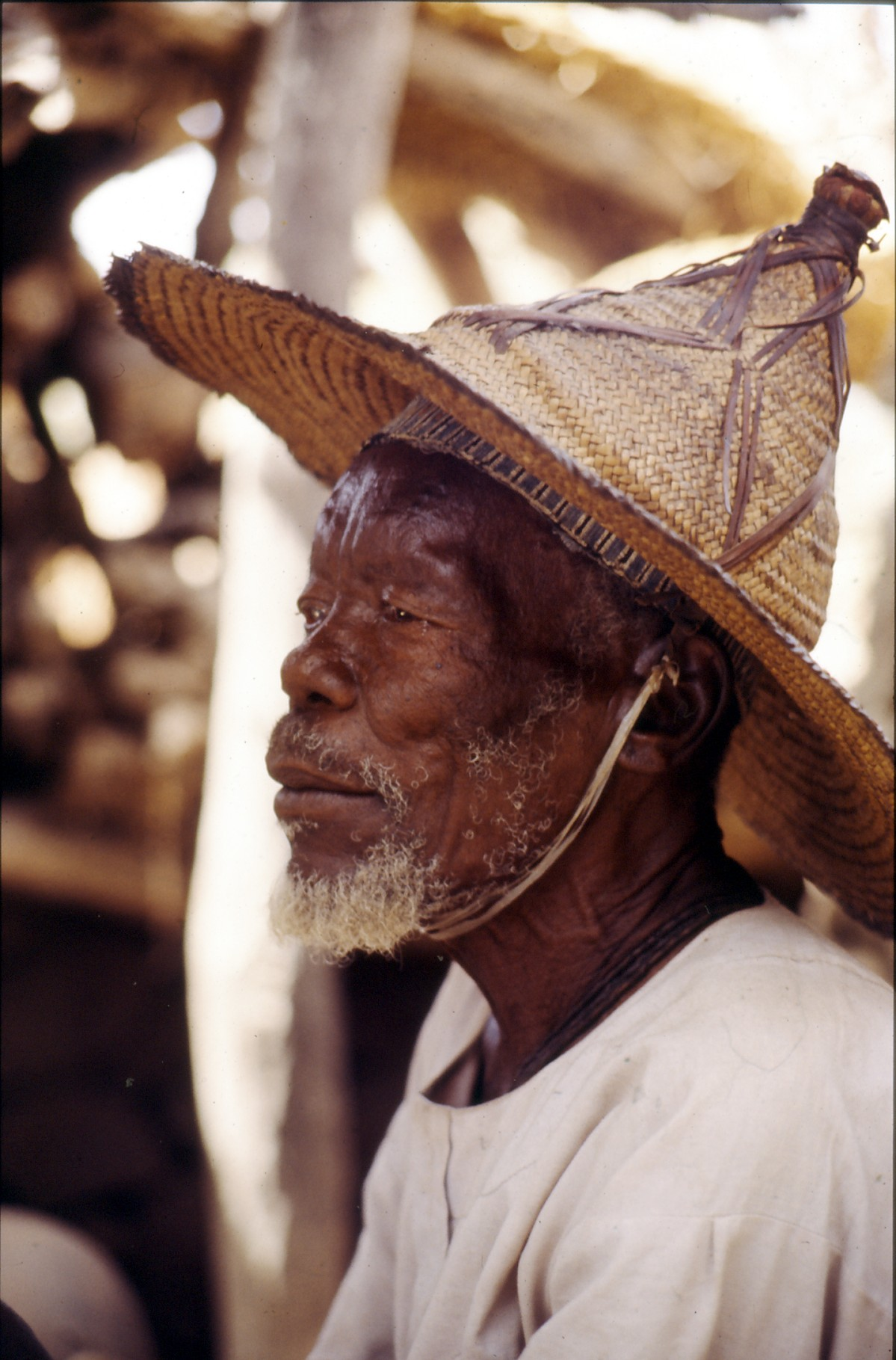
Vandu Zratè, a respected village elder of Mogode.

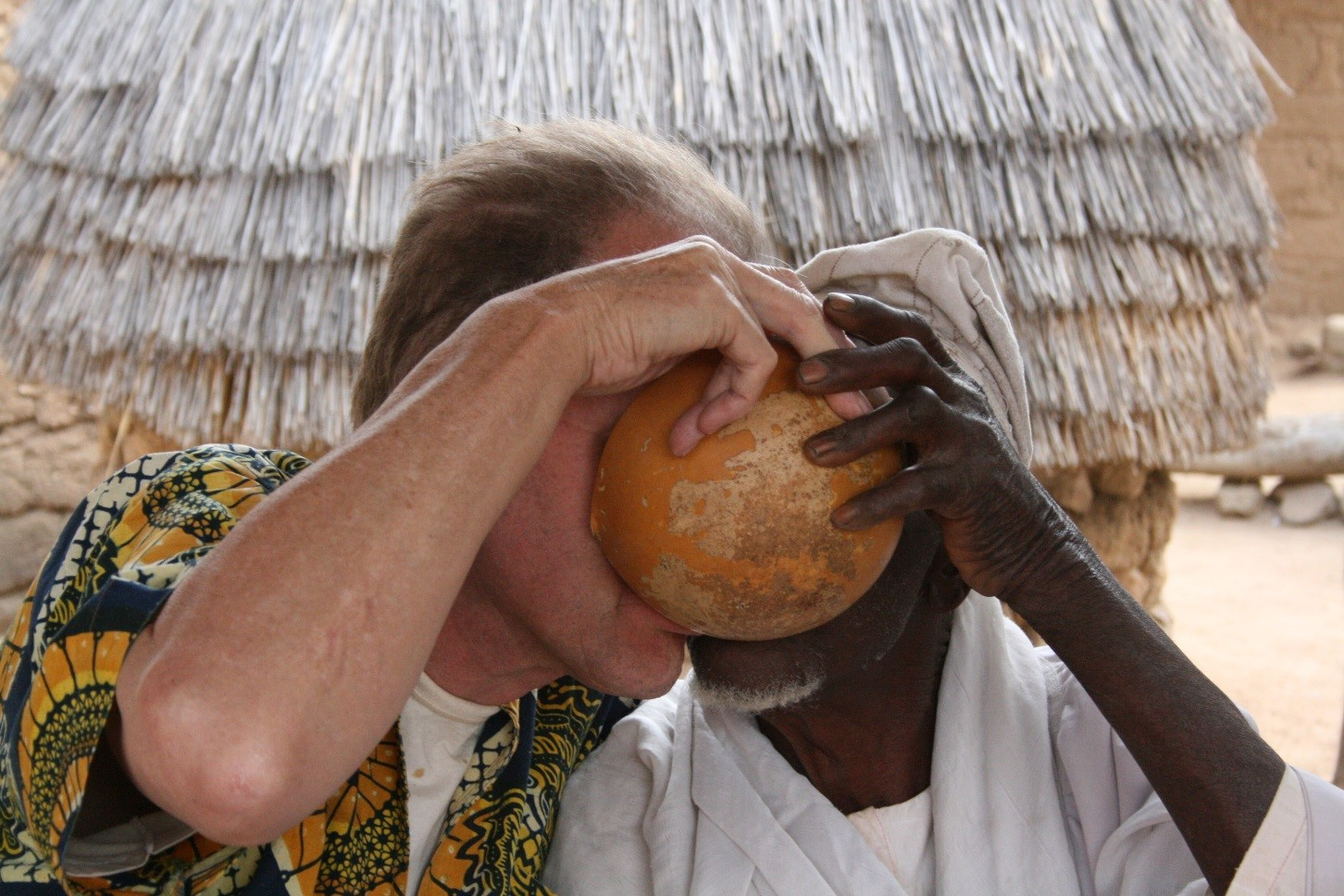
Friendship. Draining a gourd with millet beer together at the market, Mogodé, 1998.
