= Jaborowice =

Jaborowice Jaborowitz
- Village
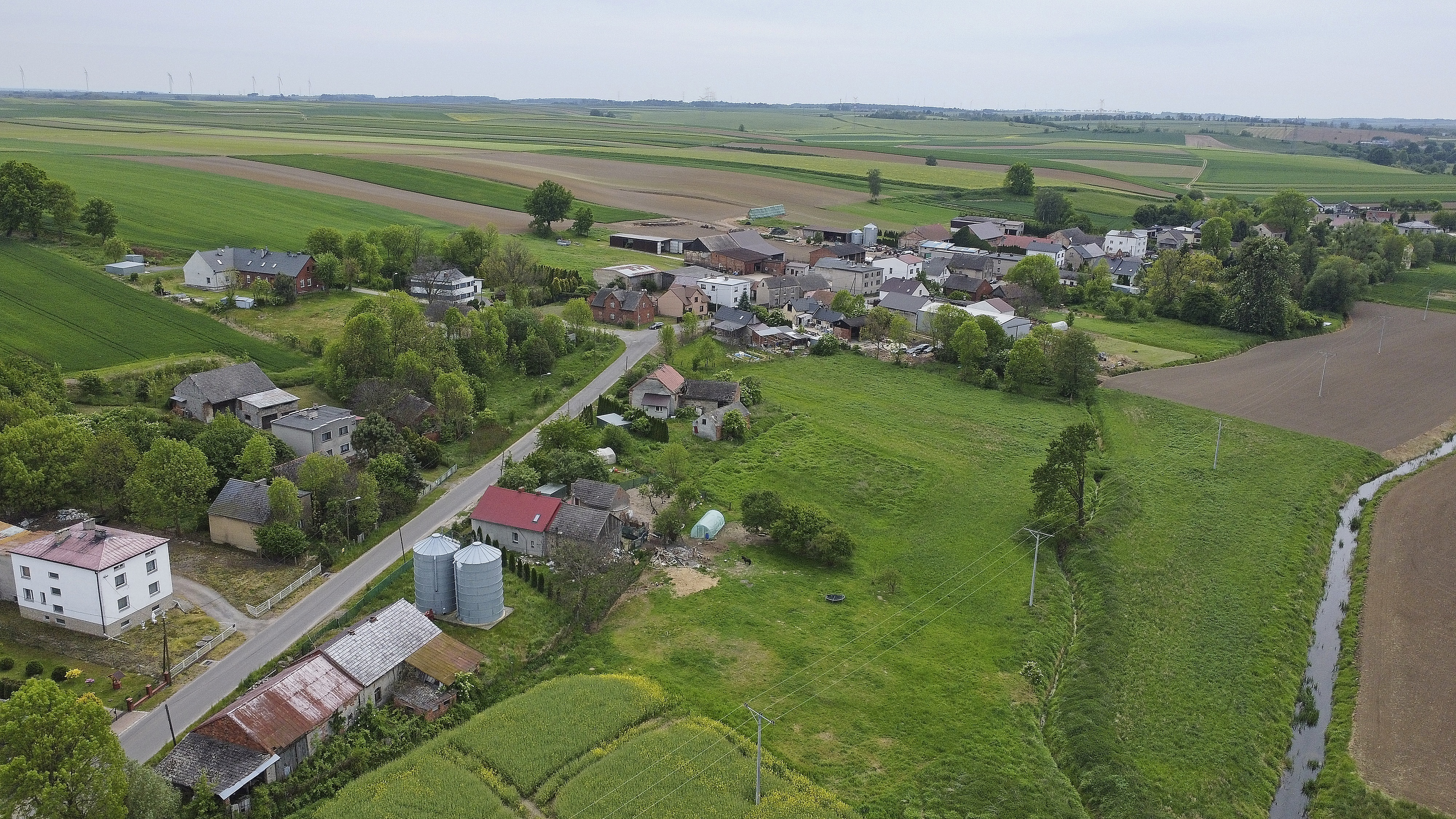
- Aerial view of Jaborowice

- Location within Poland
- Coordinates: 50°14′N 18°9′E
- Country: Poland
- Voivodeship: Opole
- County: Kędzierzyn-Koźle
- Gmina: Polska Cerekiew

Population
  - Total: 205
- Time zone: UTC+1 (CET)
  - Summer (DST): UTC+2 (CEST)
- Vehicle registration: OK

Jaborowice ([jabɔrɔˈvit͡sɛ], additional name in German: Jaborowitz) is a village in the administrative district of Gmina Polska Cerekiew, within Kędzierzyn-Koźle County, Opole Voivodeship, in southern Poland.
