= Polska Cerekiew =

Polska Cerekiew Groß Neukirch
- Village
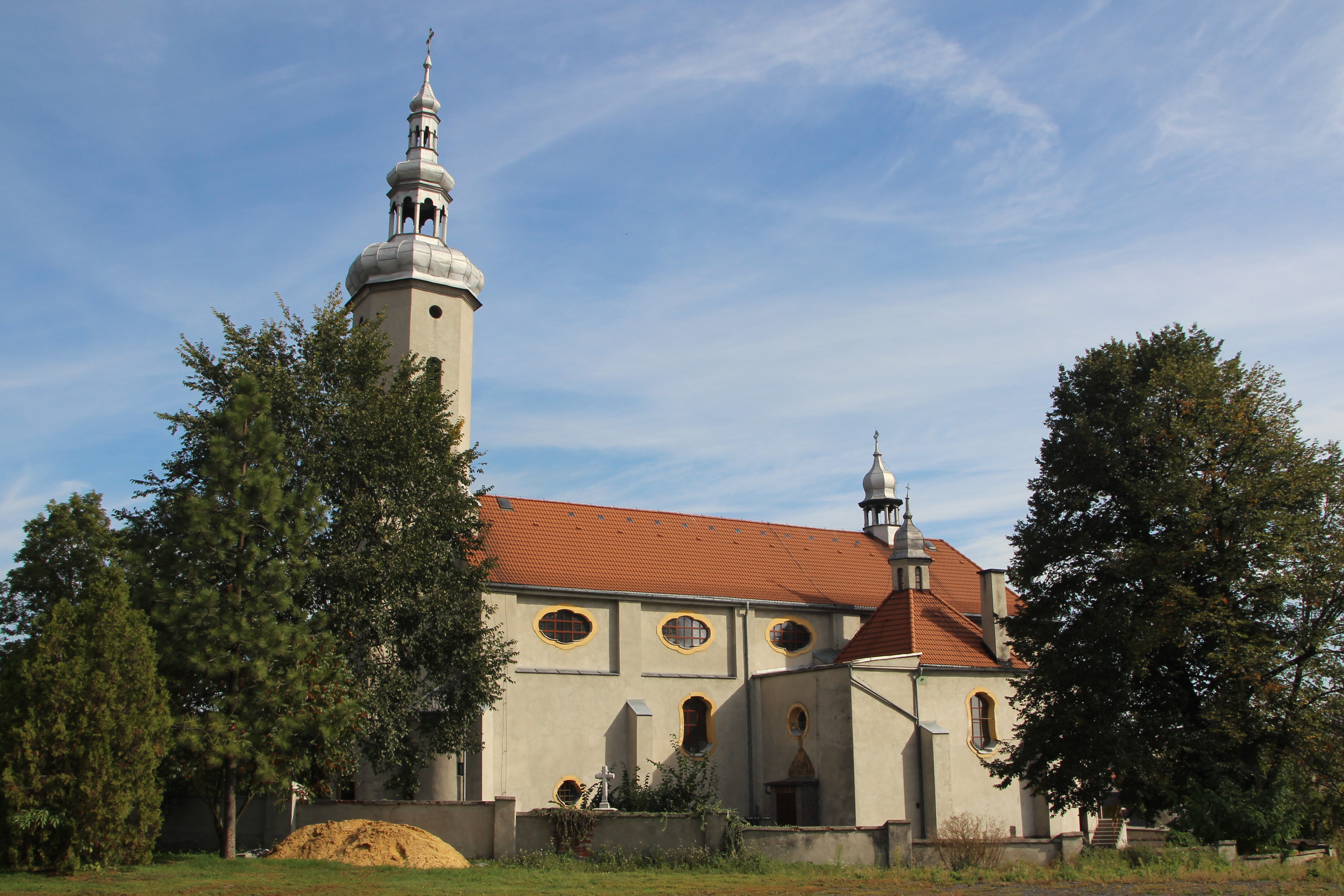
- Church of the Assumption of the Virgin Mary

- Location within Poland
- Coordinates: 50°13′45″N 18°7′38″E
- Country: Poland
- Voivodeship: Opole
- County: Kędzierzyn-Koźle
- Gmina: Polska Cerekiew

Population
  - Total: 1,429
- Time zone: UTC+1 (CET)
  - Summer (DST): UTC+2 (CEST)
- Postal code: 47-260
- Vehicle registration: OK
- Website: http://www.polskacerekiew.pl/

Polska Cerekiew ([ˈpɔlska t͡sɛˈrɛkʲɛf], additional name in German: Groß Neukirch, until 1914: Polnisch Neukirch) is a village in Kędzierzyn-Koźle County, Opole Voivodeship, in southern Poland. It is the seat of the gmina (administrative district) called Gmina Polska Cerekiew.

== History ==
The village was also known in Polish as Polska Cerkiew and simply Cerkiew in the 19th century. The name means "Polish Church".

During World War II, the German administration operated the E253 and E287 forced labour subcamps of the Stalag VIII-B/344 prisoner-of-war camp for Allied POWs in the village. 19 Polish citizens were murdered by Nazi Germany in the village during the war.

== Sights ==
The landmarks of Polska Cerekiew are the Renaissance castle and the Church of the Assumption of the Virgin Mary.

== Demographics ==
There is a German minority in the village.
