= Kossa =

Kossa may refer to:

- István Kossa (1904–1965), Hungarian politician
- Moussa Koussa (born 1949?), Libyan politician and diplomat
- Kossa Bokchan (1925–2009), Serbian painter
- Kossa F.C., Solomon Islands football club
- Von Kossa stain, method used in cell biology
