= Wronin, Opole Voivodeship =

Wronin
- Village
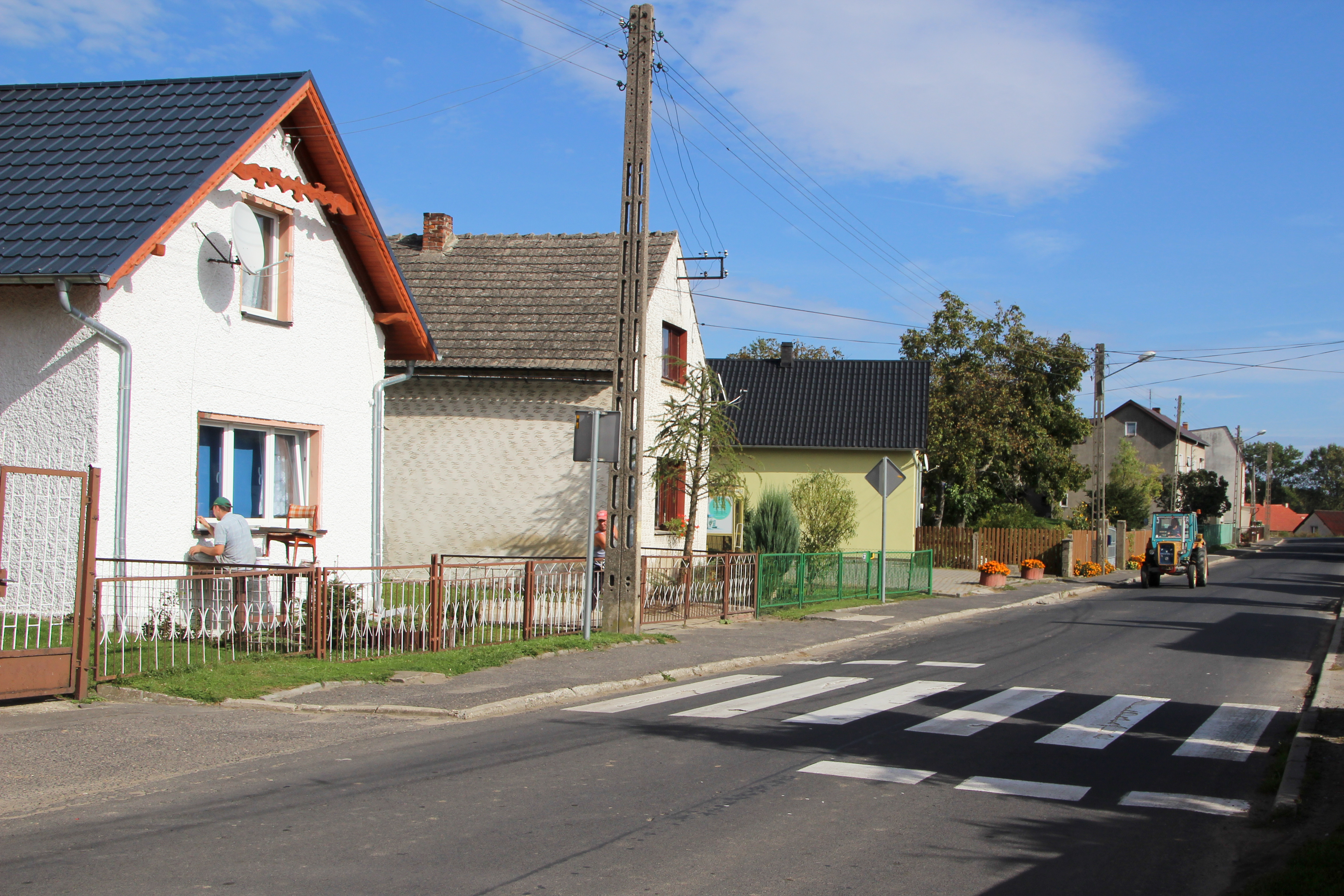

- Location within Poland
- Coordinates: 50°11′N 18°5′E
- Country: Poland
- Voivodeship: Opole
- County: Kędzierzyn-Koźle
- Gmina: Polska Cerekiew
- Population: 347
- Time zone: UTC+1 (CET)
  - Summer (DST): UTC+2 (CEST)
- Vehicle registration: OK

Wronin ([ˈvrɔnin], additional name in German: Wronin) is a village in the administrative district of Gmina Polska Cerekiew, within Kędzierzyn-Koźle County, Opole Voivodeship, in southern Poland.

The name of the village is of Polish origin and comes from the word wrona, which means "crow". In documents from 1294 and 1532 it was also mentioned under its Old Polish name Wronów.
