= Gmina Polska Cerekiew =

Gmina Polska Cerekiew Gemeinde Groß Neukirch Polska Cerekiew Commune
- Gmina
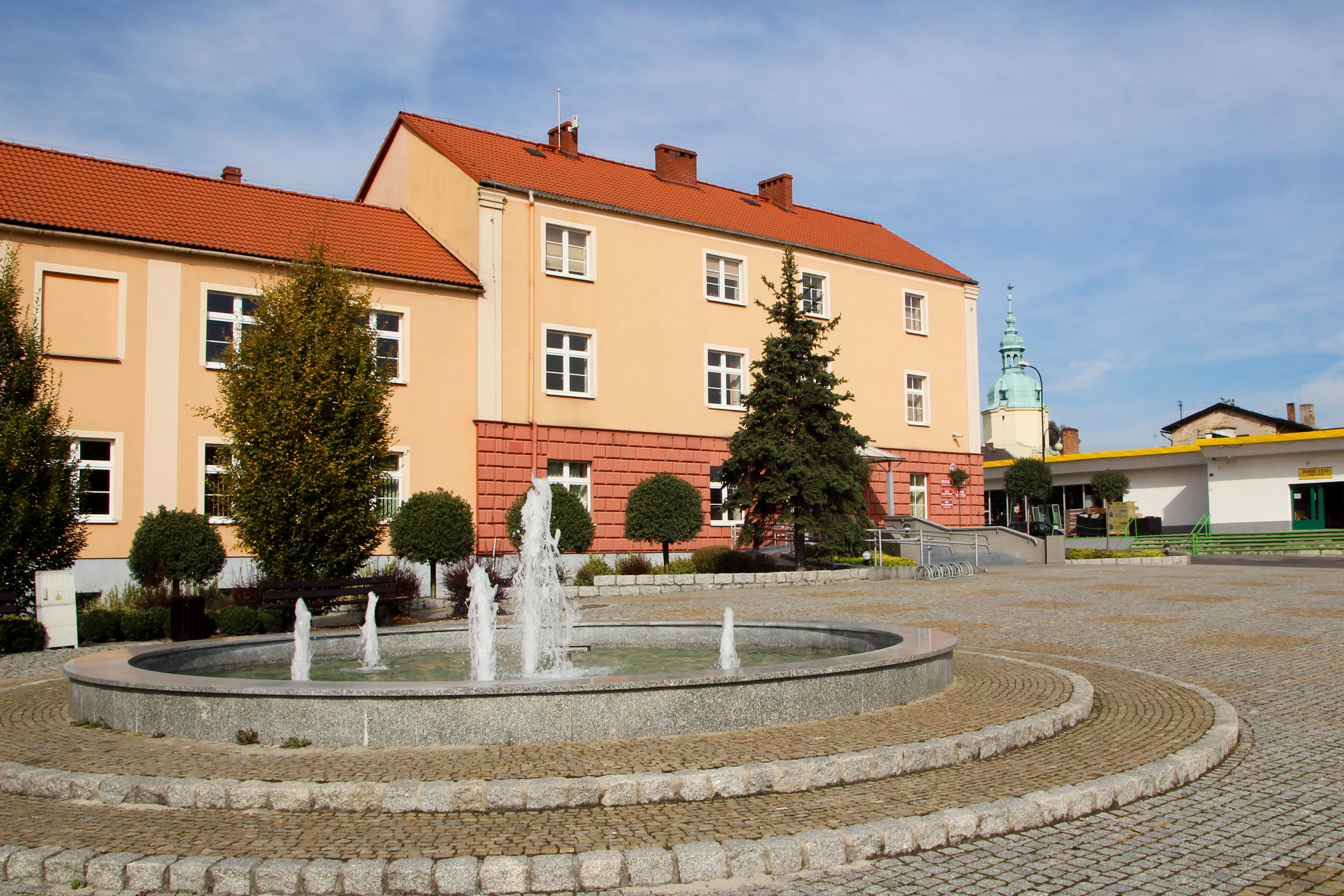
- Gmina office in Polska Cerekiew

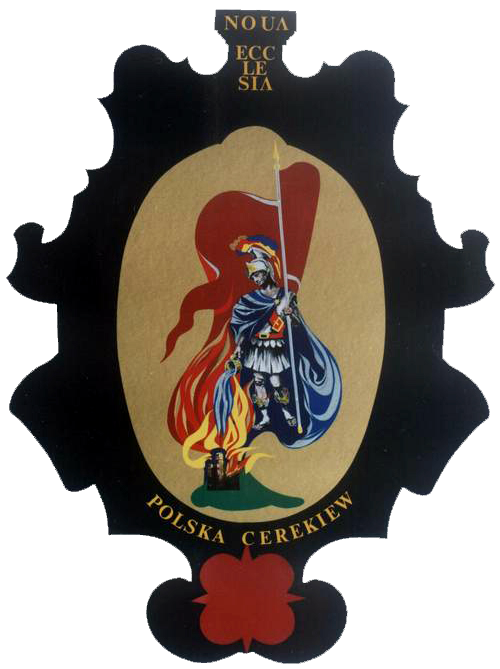
- Flag Coat of arms
- Interactive map of Gmina Polska Cerekiew
- Coordinates (Polska Cerekiew): 50°13′45″N 18°7′38″E
- Country: Poland
- Voivodeship: Opole
- County: Kędzierzyn-Koźle
- Seat: Polska Cerekiew

Area
  - Total: 60.85 km^{2} (23.49 sq mi)

Population (2019-06-30)
  - Total: 4,021
  - Density: 66.08/km^{2} (171.1/sq mi)
- Time zone: UTC+1 (CET)
  - Summer (DST): UTC+2 (CEST)
- Vehicle registration: OK
- Website: http://polskacerekiew.pl

Gmina Polska Cerekiew (German: Gemeinde Groß Neukirch) is a rural gmina (administrative district) in Kędzierzyn-Koźle County, Opole Voivodeship, in southern Poland. Its seat is the village of Polska Cerekiew, which lies approximately 15 kilometres (9 mi) south of Kędzierzyn-Koźle and 51 km (32 mi) south of the regional capital Opole.

The gmina covers an area of 60.85 square kilometres (23.5 sq mi), and as of 2019 its total population is 4,021. Since 2011 the commune has been bilingual in Polish and German, and has its signs in two languages.

== Administrative divisions ==
The commune contains the villages and settlements of:

- Polska Cerekiew
- Ciężkowice
- Dzielawy
- Grzędzin
- Jaborowice
- Koza
- Łaniec
- Ligota Mała
- Mierzęcin
- Połowa
- Witosławice
- Wronin
- Zakrzów

== Neighbouring gminas ==
Gmina Polska Cerekiew is bordered by the gminas of Baborów and Rudnik.

== Twin towns – sister cities ==
Gmina Polska Cerekiew is twinned with:

- Rieste, Germany
- Světlá Hora, Czech Republic

== Gallery ==
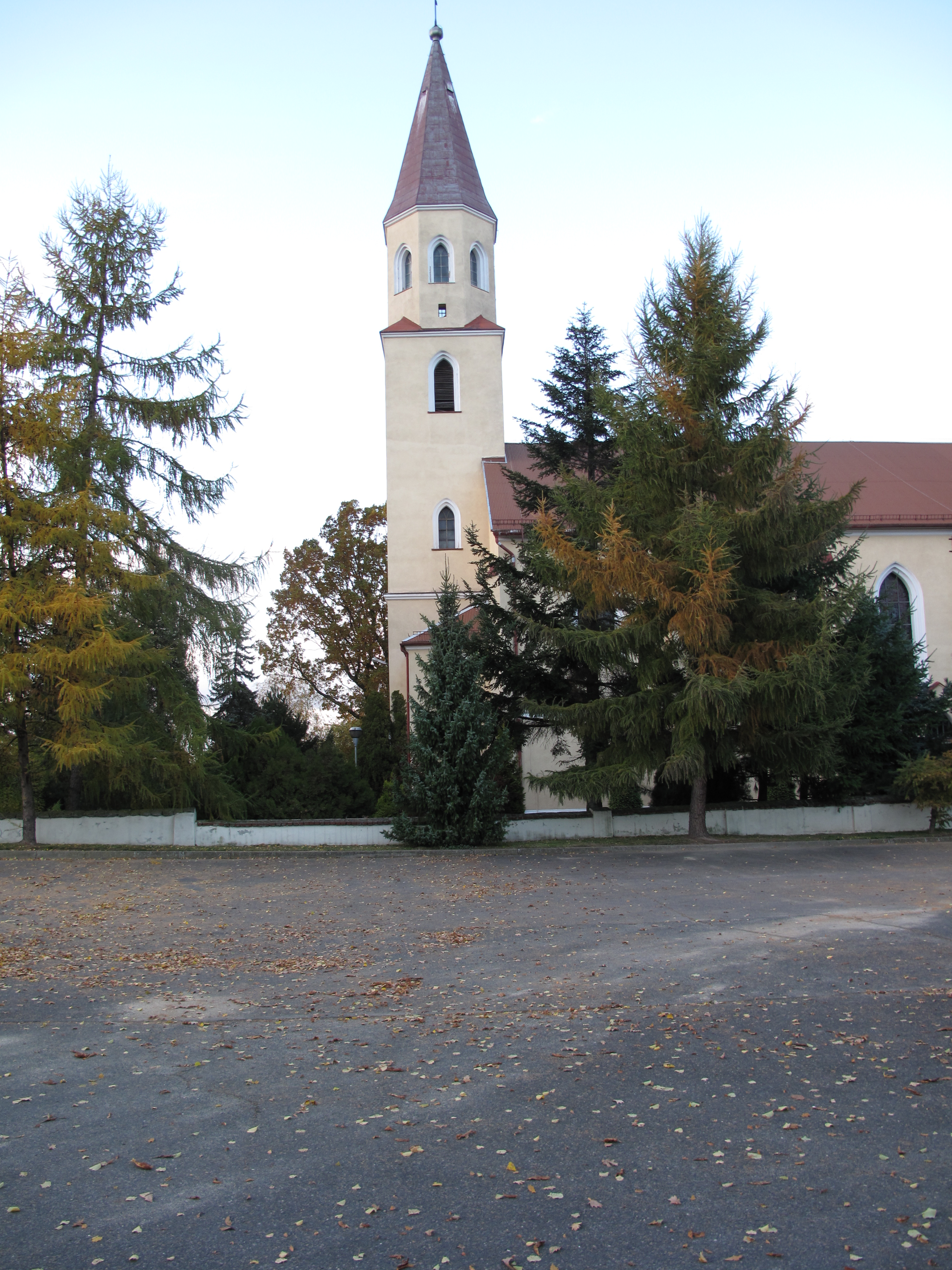
Church in Grzędzin

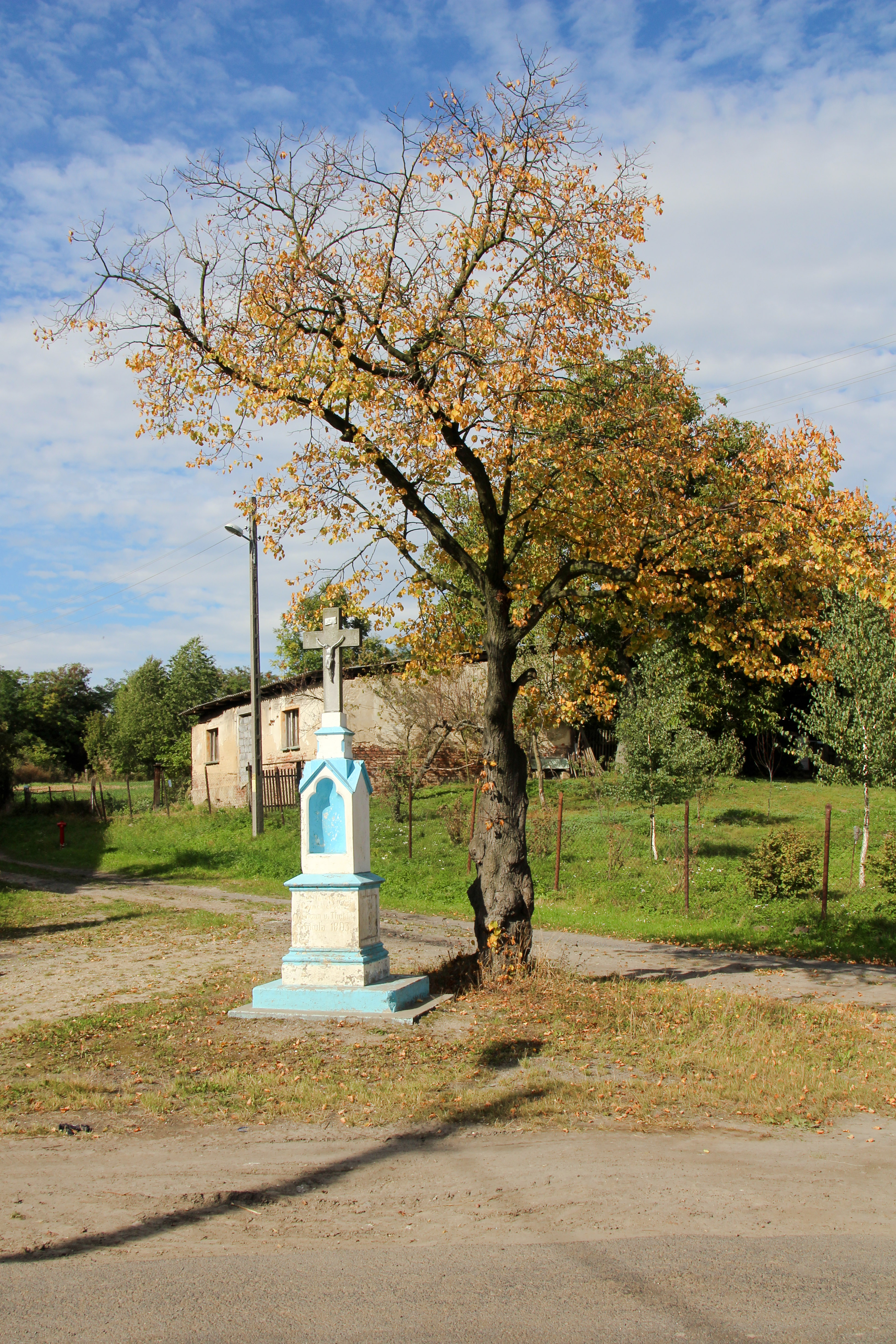

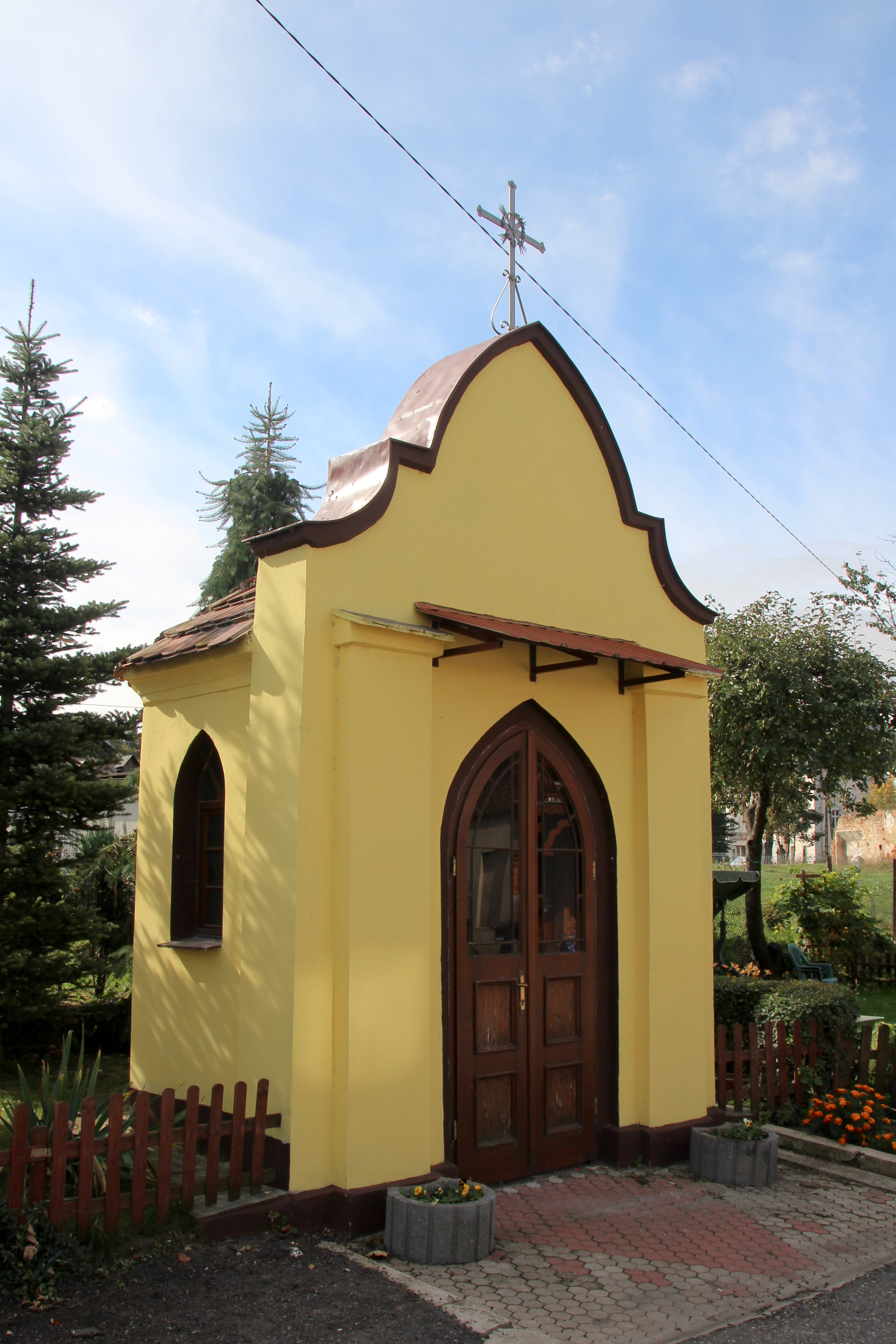
Ciężkowice
