= Ligota Mała, Opole Voivodeship =

Ligota Mała Klein Ellguth
- Village
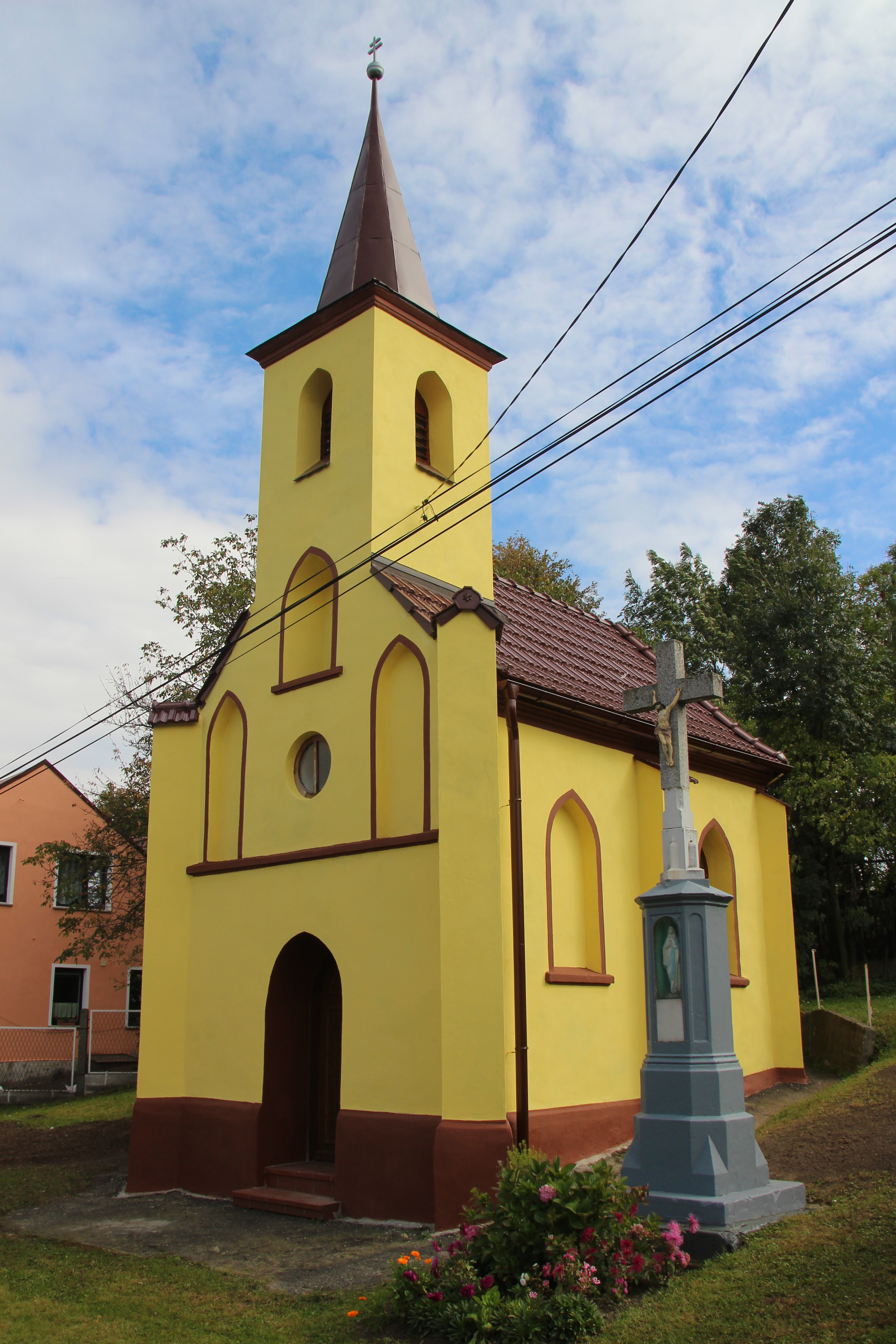
- Chapel

- Location within Poland
- Coordinates: 50°13′57″N 18°5′45″E
- Country: Poland
- Voivodeship: Opole
- County: Kędzierzyn-Koźle
- Gmina: Polska Cerekiew

Population
  - Total: 184
- Time zone: UTC+1 (CET)
  - Summer (DST): UTC+2 (CEST)
- Vehicle registration: OK

Ligota Mała ([liˈɡɔta ˈmawa], additional name in German: Klein Ellguth) is a village in the administrative district of Gmina Polska Cerekiew, within Kędzierzyn-Koźle County, Opole Voivodeship, in southern Poland.

Three Polish citizens were murdered by Nazi Germany in the village during World War II.
