= Zakrzów, Kędzierzyn-Koźle County =

Zakrzów Sakrau
- Village
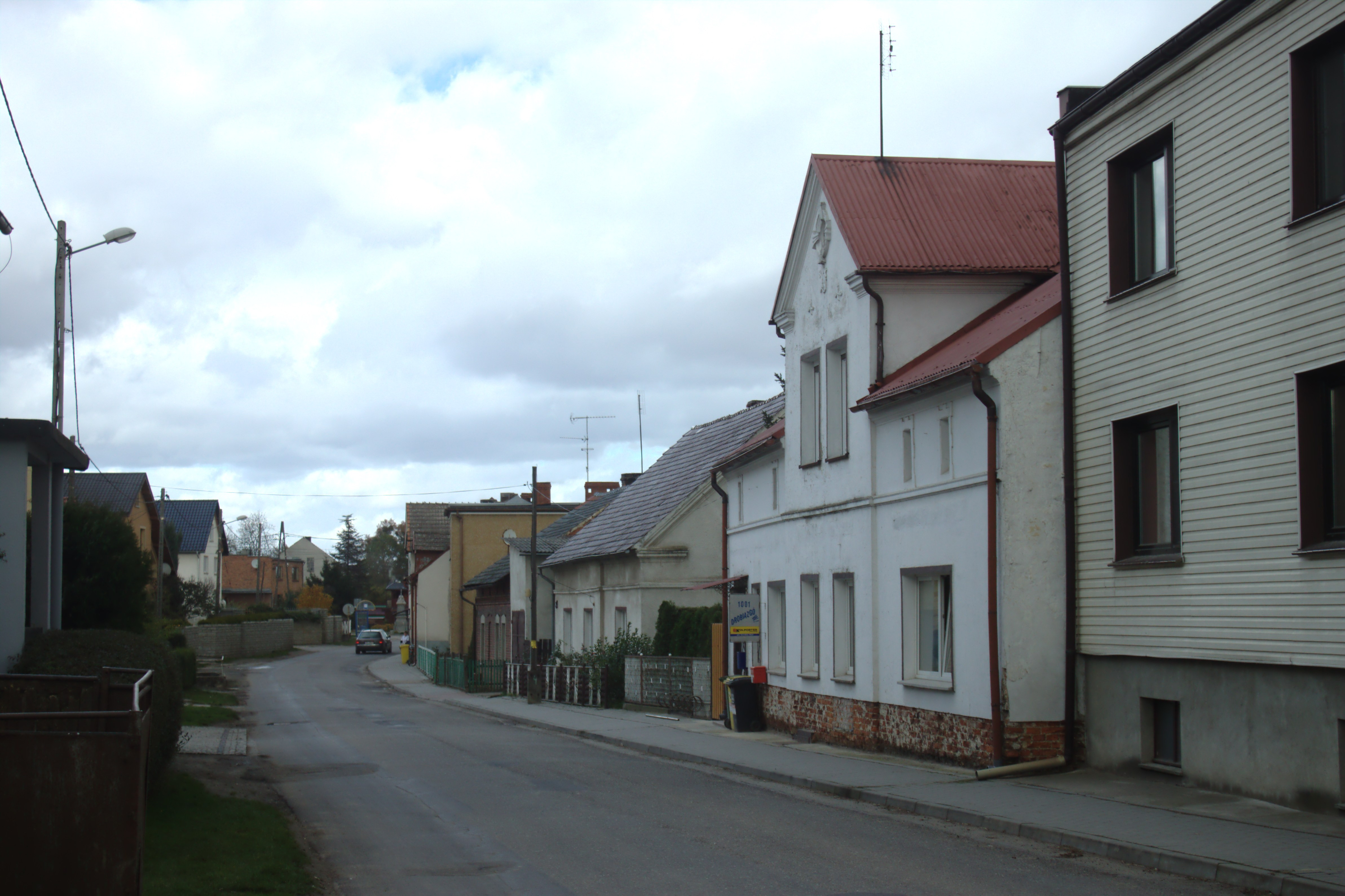
- Houses in Zakrzów

- Location within Poland
- Coordinates: 50°14′58″N 18°9′20″E
- Country: Poland
- Voivodeship: Opole
- County: Kędzierzyn-Koźle
- Gmina: Polska Cerekiew

Population
  - Total: 1,035
- Time zone: UTC+1 (CET)
  - Summer (DST): UTC+2 (CEST)
- Vehicle registration: OK

Zakrzów ([ˈzakʂuf], additional name in German: Sakrau) is a village in the administrative district of Gmina Polska Cerekiew, within Kędzierzyn-Koźle County, Opole Voivodeship, in southern Poland.

== History ==
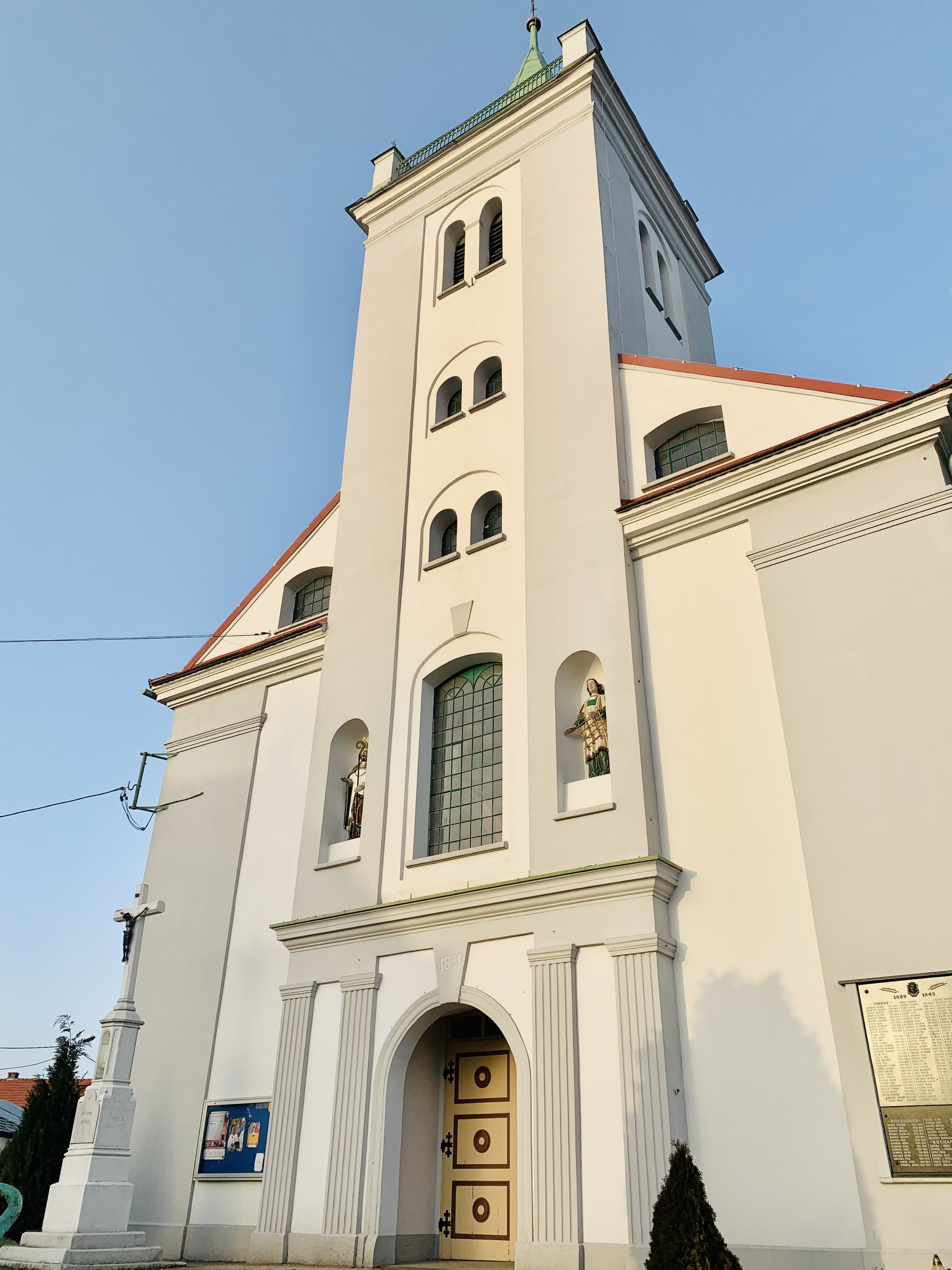
Saint Nicholas church

The name of the village comes from the Polish words za krzewami, which means "behind the bushes", and refers to its location. In the Middle Ages it was part of Piast-ruled Poland, and afterwards it was also part of Bohemia (Czechia), Prussia and Germany. In 1936, the German administration changed the name to Rosengrund in attempt to erase traces of Polish origin.

During World War II the Germans operated the E704 forced labour subcamp of the Stalag VIII-B/344 prisoner-of-war camp in the village. 30 Polish citizens were murdered by Nazi Germany in the village during the war. The village became again part of Poland after the defeat of Nazi Germany in the war in 1945, and its historic Polish name was restored.
