= Karl Henke (general) =

German general

- Born: 22 July 1896; Berlin, German Empire
- Died: 27 April 1945 (aged 48) near Pillau/Neutief, East Prussia, Germany
- Military career
- Allegiance: German Empire (to 1918); Weimar Republic (to 1933); Nazi Germany
- Branch: Army
- Service years: 1914–1945
- Rank: Generalmajor
- Commands: PiLandungsRgt 770 (mot.)
- Conflicts: World War I World War II
- Awards: Knight's Cross of the Iron Cross

Karl Henke (22 July 1896 in Berlin – 27 April 1945 in Neutief) was an engineer officer in the Reichsheer during World War I, in the German inter-war army, the Reichswehr, and in the Wehrmacht.

== Military service, World War I ==
Henke's military service began in 1914 as a cadet with a pioneer battalion. He was promoted to officer in 1915, but in 1916 was seriously wounded and unable to return to frontline service. Posted to Libau, he became involved in developing landing operations, an area in which he specialised for the remainder of his career.

Continuing to serve with the Reichswehr and then the Wehrmacht, by 1939 Henke had been promoted to lieutenant-colonel.

== Military service, World War II ==
On September 1, 1939, Henke was involved in the first major battle of Nazi Germany's invasion of Poland, the Battle of Westerplatte, where he led the assault engineer company.

Henke was intended to lead Operation Nordlicht, the attempt to take Leningrad in 1942, but when this was cancelled was transferred to the Crimea, where the Seventeenth Army was eventually trapped by Soviet forces. Here, Henke organised the evacuation of troops across the Strait of Kerch, an action for which he received the Knight's Cross of the Iron Cross, and from the Kuban bridgehead. Promoted to major-general, and appointed the senior commander of Wehrmacht landing operations, Henke oversaw the evacuation of German troops from islands in the Baltic Sea and from Estonia late in 1944.

From January 1945 Henke became responsible for the supply of Fourth Army, trapped in the Heiligenbeil pocket in East Prussia. In this role he was in part responsible for the evacuation of up to a million civilians from East Prussia and through the port of Pillau, which was retained as long as possible; on 24 April, he was placed in command of the 290th Infantry Division, which had been transported by sea from the Courland Pocket. Henke and his unit finally abandoned Pillau on 25 April for the nearby Batterie Lehmberg fortifications at Neutief (Noytif was Russian correspondence of Neutef before 1946) on the Frische Nehrung. After a failed breakout attempt around 200 men continued to resist the besieging Soviet forces to the last round at 15:30 on 27 April; Henke, refusing to surrender, then shot himself. It is said that the opposing Soviet commander praised Henke's bravery and treated Henke's surviving men well - unusual conduct for either side on the Eastern Front.

== Awards and decorations ==
- Iron Cross (1914)
  - 2nd Class
  - 1st Class
- Wound Badge (1914)
  - in Black
- Cross of Honor
- Wehrmacht Long Service Award 4th to 1st Class
- Sudetenland Medal with Prague Castle Bar
- War Merit Cross with Swords
  - 2nd Class
- Iron Cross (1939)
  - 2nd Class
  - 1st Class
- Knight's Cross of the Iron Cross on 4 August 1943 as Oberst and commander of Pionier-Landungs-Regiment 770 (motorized)

== See also ==
- List of Knight's Cross Recipients
