= Mierzęcin, Gmina Polska Cerekiew =

Mierzęcin Mierzenzin
- Village
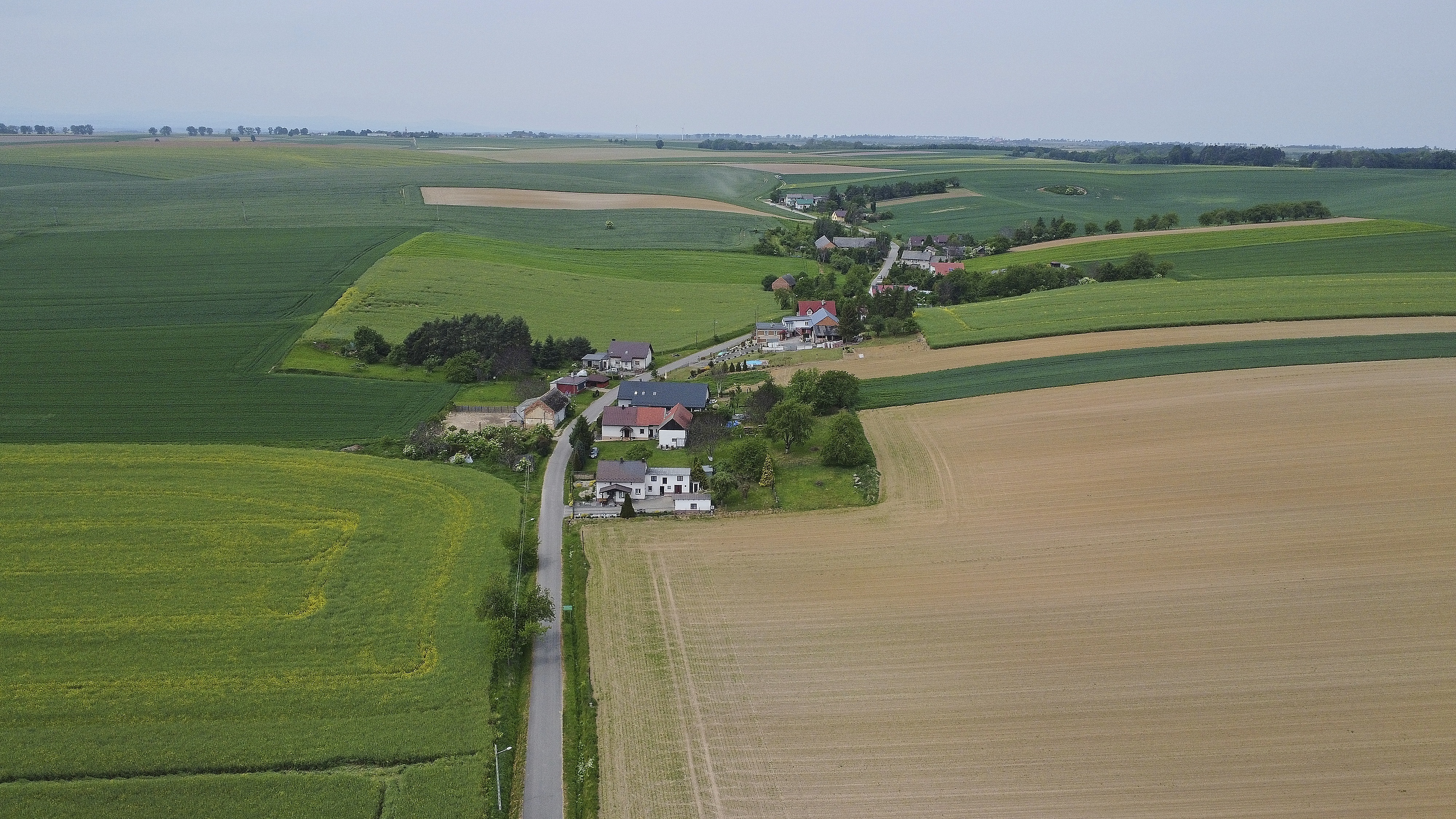
- Aerial view of Mierzęcin

- Location within Poland
- Coordinates: 50°11′08″N 18°04′30″E
- Country: Poland
- Voivodeship: Opole
- County: Kędzierzyn-Koźle
- Gmina: Polska Cerekiew

Population
  - Total: 64
- Time zone: UTC+1 (CET)
  - Summer (DST): UTC+2 (CEST)
- Vehicle registration: OK

Mierzęcin ([mjɛˈʐɛnt͡ɕin], additional name in German: Mierzenzin) is a village in the administrative district of Gmina Polska Cerekiew, within Kędzierzyn-Koźle County, Opole Voivodeship, in southern Poland.
