= Grzędzin =

Grzędzin Grzendzin
- Village
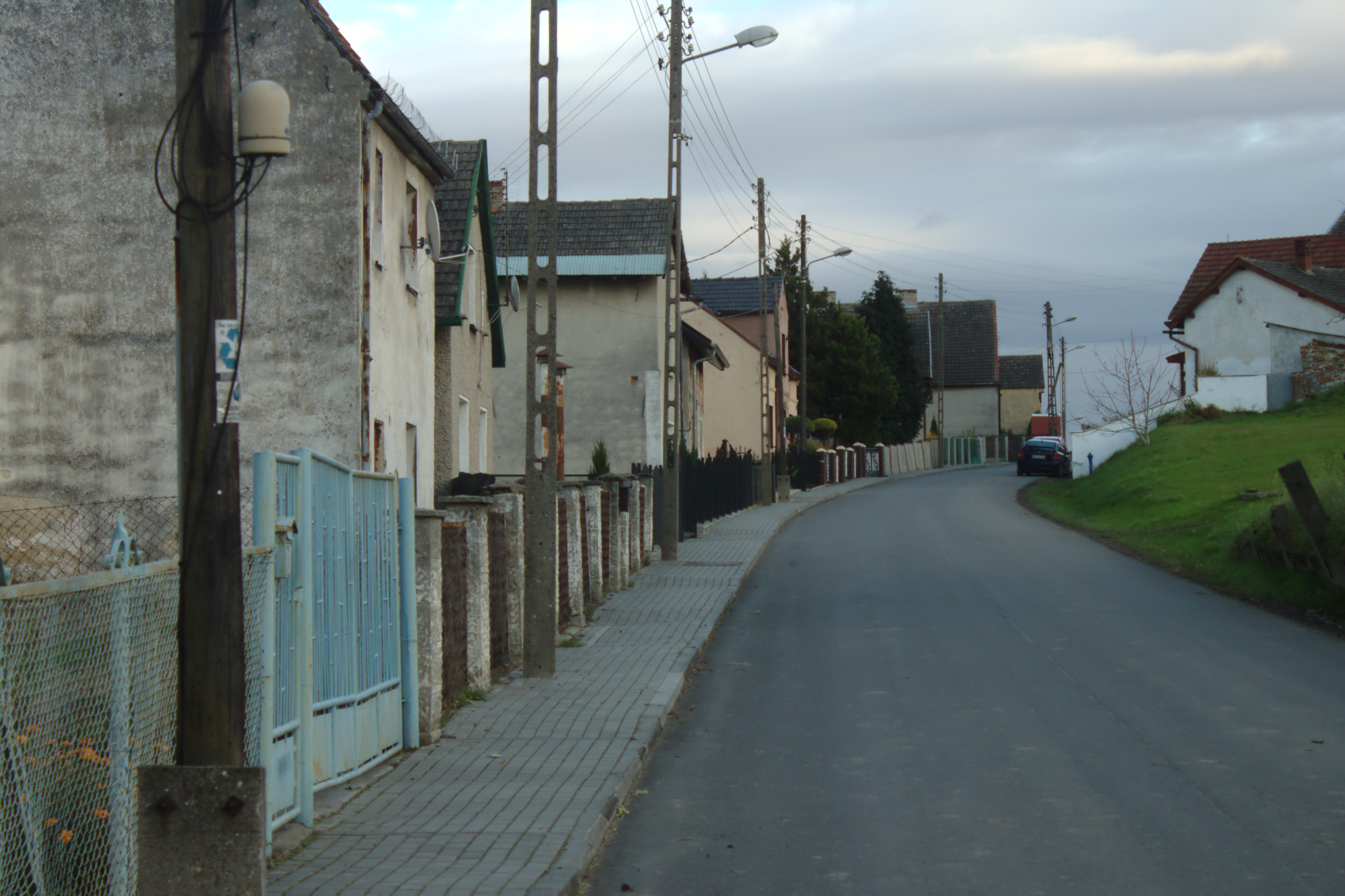
- Street

- Location within Poland
- Coordinates: 50°11′N 18°6′E
- Country: Poland
- Voivodeship: Opole
- County: Kędzierzyn-Koźle
- Gmina: Polska Cerekiew
- Population: 329
- Time zone: UTC+1 (CET)
  - Summer (DST): UTC+2 (CEST)
- Vehicle registration: OK

Grzędzin ([ˈɡʐɛnd͡ʑin], additional name in German: Grzendzin) is a village in the administrative district of Gmina Polska Cerekiew, within Kędzierzyn-Koźle County, Opole Voivodeship, in southern Poland.
