= Figuil =

- Commune and town
- Location in Cameroon
- Coordinates: 9°46′N 13°58′E
- Country: Cameroon
- Region: North
- Department: Mayo-Louti
- Elevation: 277 m (909 ft)

Population (2012)
  - Total: 29,399
- Time zone: UTC+1 (WAT)

Figuil is a town and commune in Cameroon.

== See also ==
- Communes of Cameroon
