= Ciężkowice, Opole Voivodeship =

Ciężkowice Czienskowitz
- Village
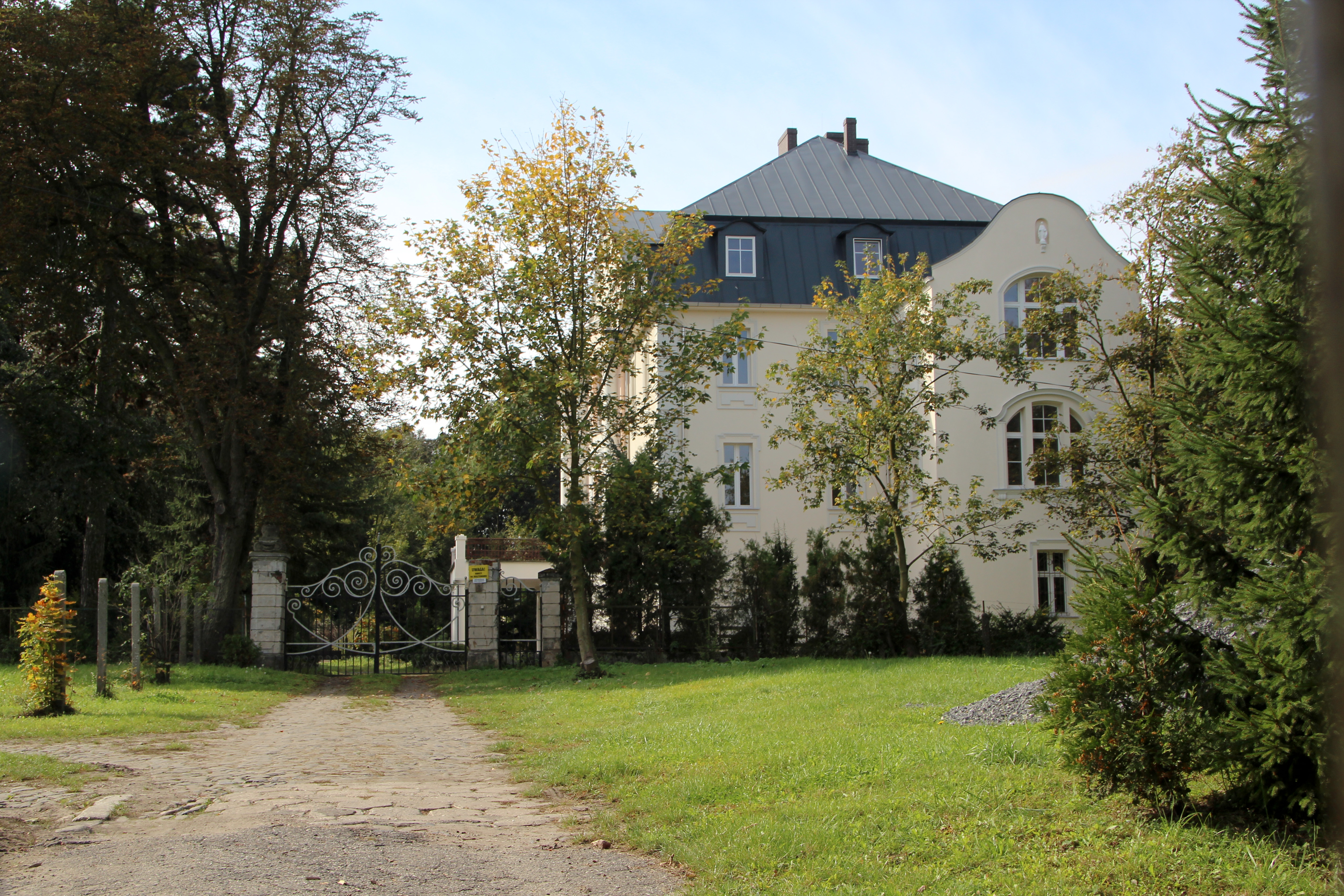

- Location within Poland
- Coordinates: 50°13′0″N 18°8′1″E
- Country: Poland
- Voivodeship: Opole
- County: Kędzierzyn-Koźle
- Gmina: Polska Cerekiew

Population
  - Total: 422
- Time zone: UTC+1 (CET)
  - Summer (DST): UTC+2 (CEST)
- Vehicle registration: OK

Ciężkowice ([t͡ɕɛ̃ʂkɔˈvit͡sɛ], additional name in German: Czienskowitz) is a village in the administrative district of Gmina Polska Cerekiew, within Kędzierzyn-Koźle County, Opole Voivodeship, in southern Poland.
