= Koza, Opole Voivodeship =

Koza
- Village
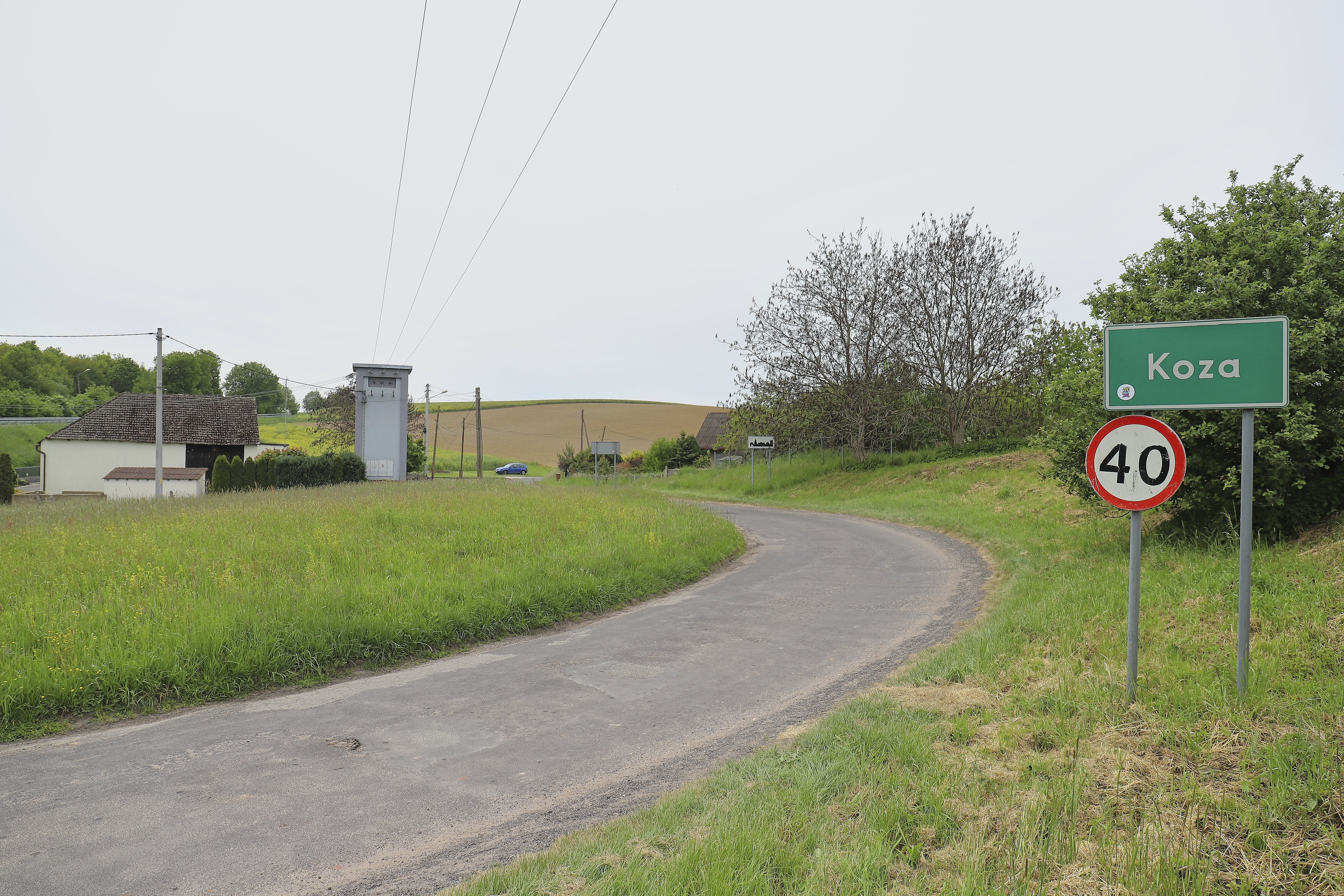

- Location within Poland
- Coordinates: 50°10′44″N 18°3′31″E
- Country: Poland
- Voivodeship: Opole
- County: Kędzierzyn-Koźle
- Gmina: Polska Cerekiew
- Population: 61
- Website: http://www.koza.friko.pl

Koza [ˈkɔza] (German: Heinrichsdorf) is a village in the administrative district of Gmina Polska Cerekiew, within Kędzierzyn-Koźle County, Opole Voivodeship, in south-western Poland.

The German name of the village, Heinrichsdorf, indicates that the village was founded in the Middle Ages by German settlers.
