= Xhosa =

Xhosa may refer to:

- Xhosa people, a nation, and ethnic group, who live in south-central and southeasterly region of South Africa
- Xhosa language, one of the 11 official languages of South Africa, principally spoken by the Xhosa people

== See also ==
- Khosa (disambiguation)
- Kosa (disambiguation)
- Xosa (disambiguation)
