= Mayo-Tsanaga =

Coordinates: 10°44′24″N 13°48′10″E

- Department
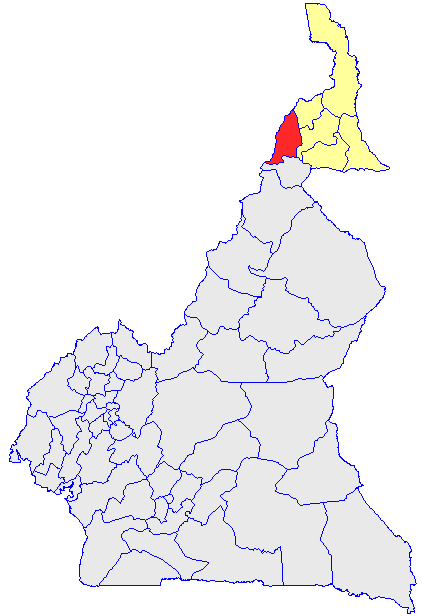
- Department location in Cameroon
- Country: Cameroon
- Province: Extreme-Nord Province
- Capital: Mokolo

Area
  - Total: 1,696 sq mi (4,393 km^{2})

Population (2005)
  - Total: 699,971
- Time zone: UTC+1 (WAT)

Mayo-Tsanaga is a department of Extreme-Nord Province in Cameroon. The department covers an area of 4,393 km^{2} and at the 2005 Census had a total population of 699,971. The capital of the department is at Mokolo. It is located within the Mandara Mountains, on the border with Nigeria.

== Subdivisions ==
The department is divided administratively into 7 communes and in turn into villages.

=== Communes ===
- Bourrha
- Hina
- Koza
- Mogodé
- Mokolo
- Modzogo
- Souledé-Roua

== Gallery ==
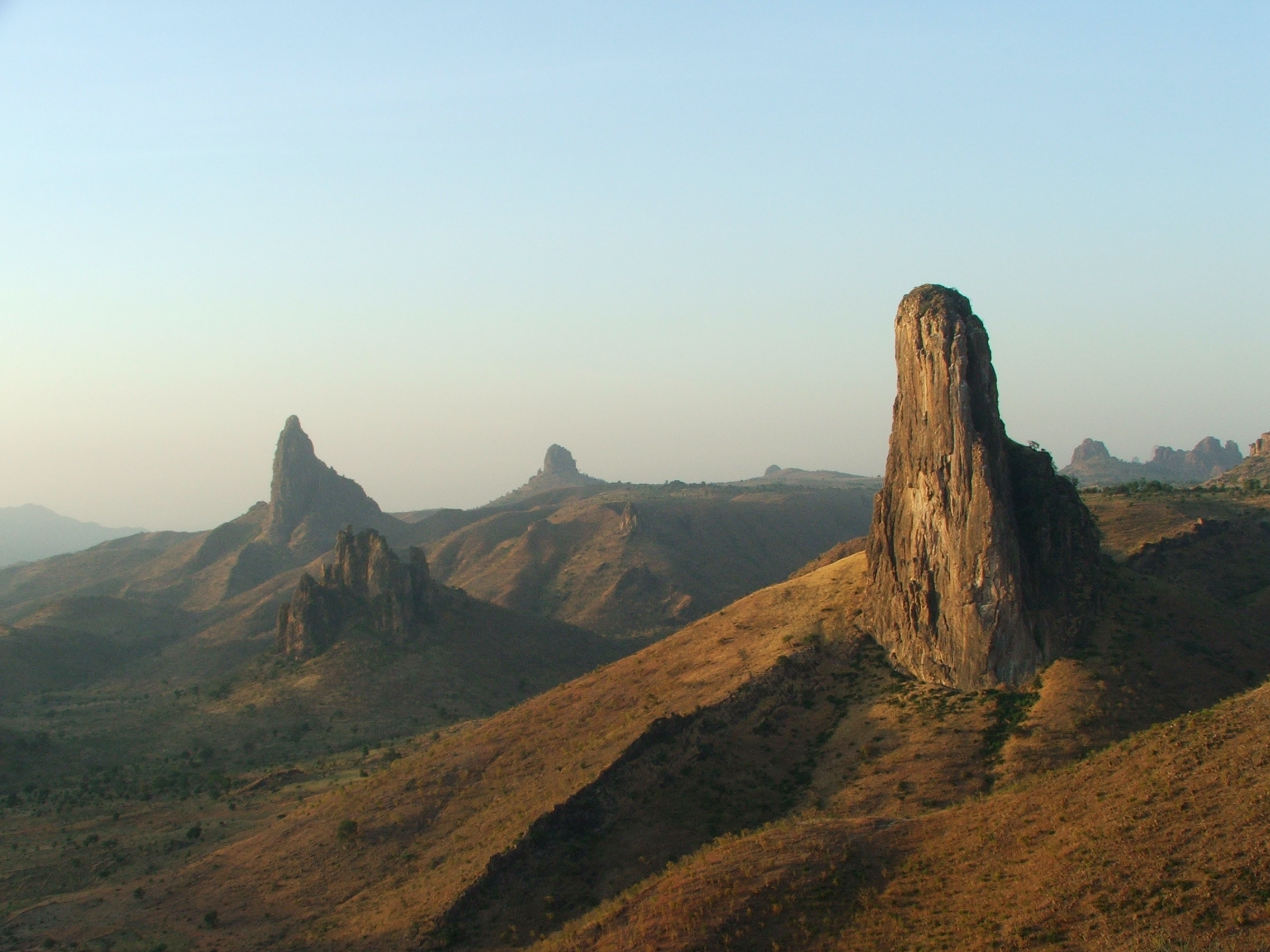
Mandara Mountains

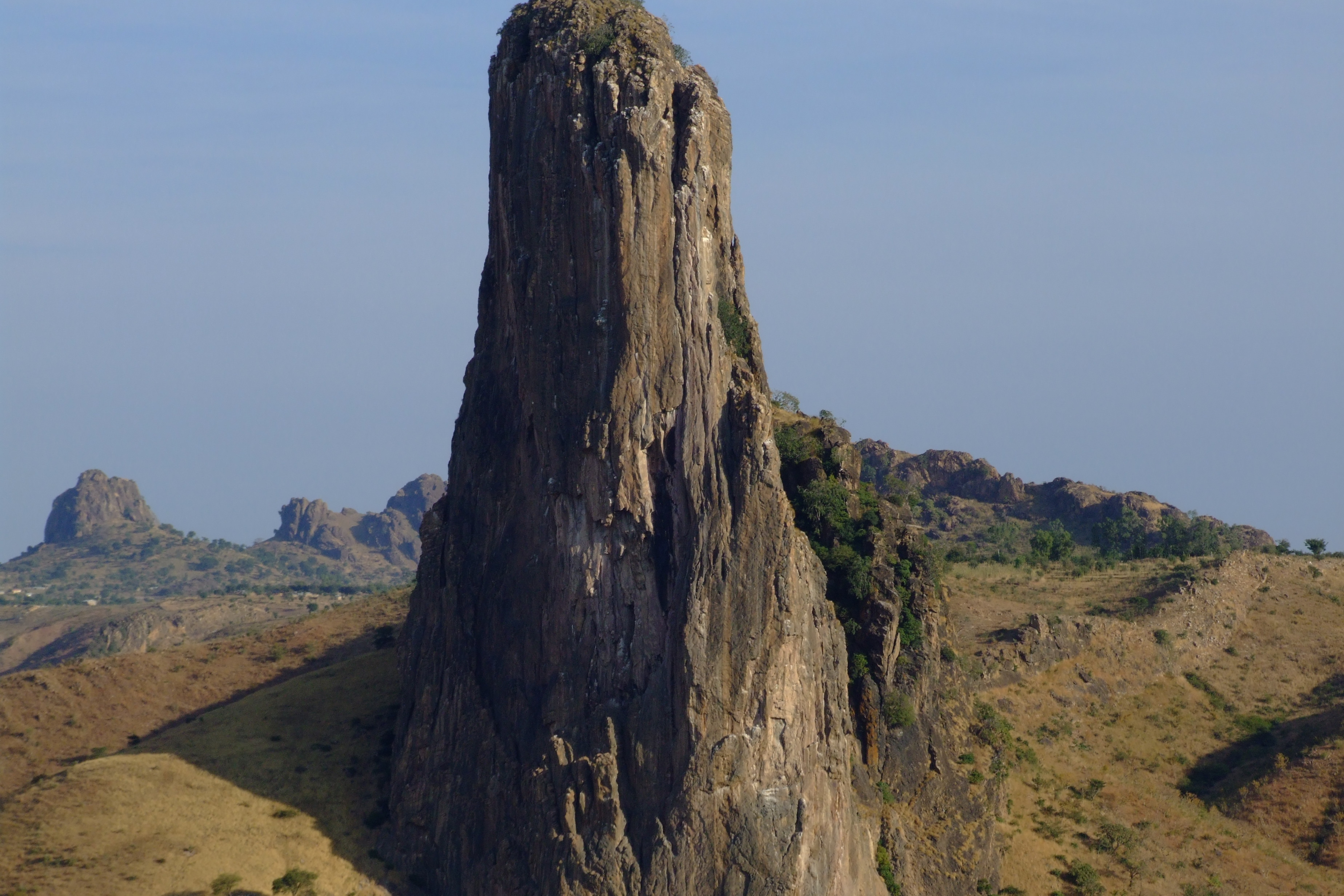
Mandara Mountains

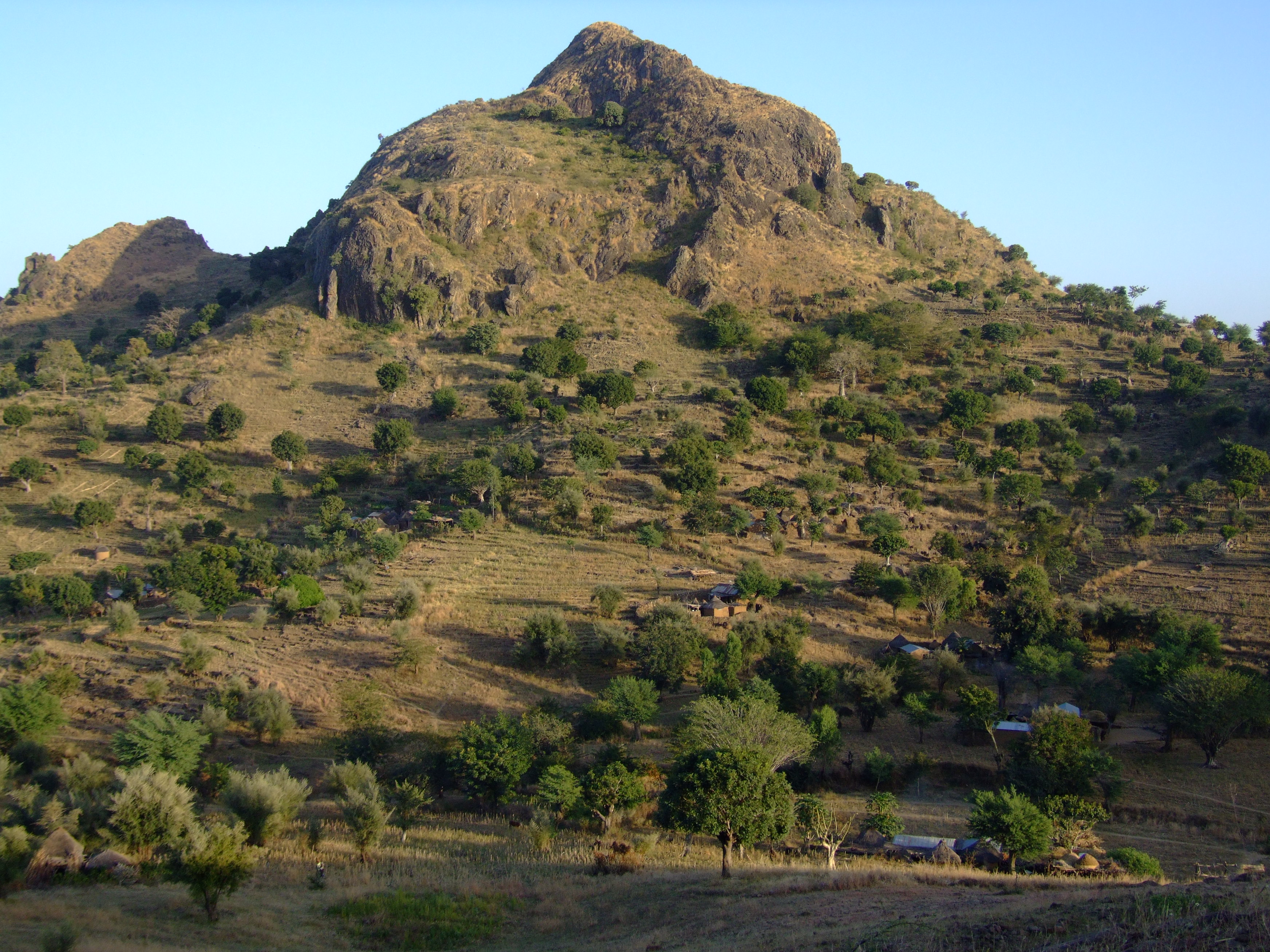
Mandara Mountains
