= Mayo-Louti =

- Department
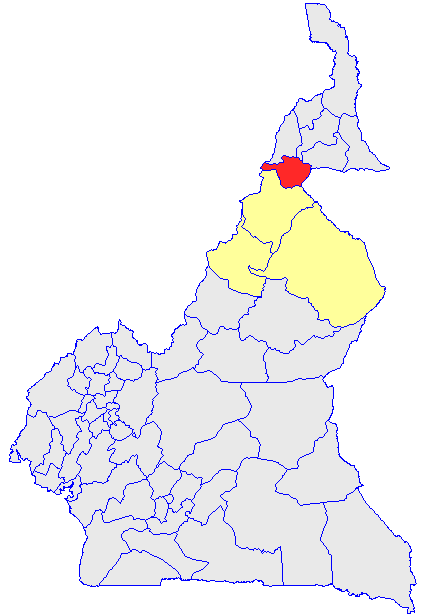
- Department location in Cameroon
- Coordinates: 9.9290°N 13.8795°E
- Country: Cameroon
- Province: North Province
- Capital: Guider

Area
  - Total: 4,161 km^{2} (1,607 sq mi)

Population (2001)
  - Total: 334,312
  - Density: 80.34/km^{2} (208.1/sq mi)
- Time zone: UTC+1 (WAT)

Mayo-Louti is a department of North Province in Cameroon. The department covers an area of 4,161 km^{2} (1,607 sq mi) and as of 2001 had a total population of 334,312. The capital of the department is Guider.

== Subdivisions ==
The department is divided administratively into 3 communes and in turn into villages.

=== Communes ===
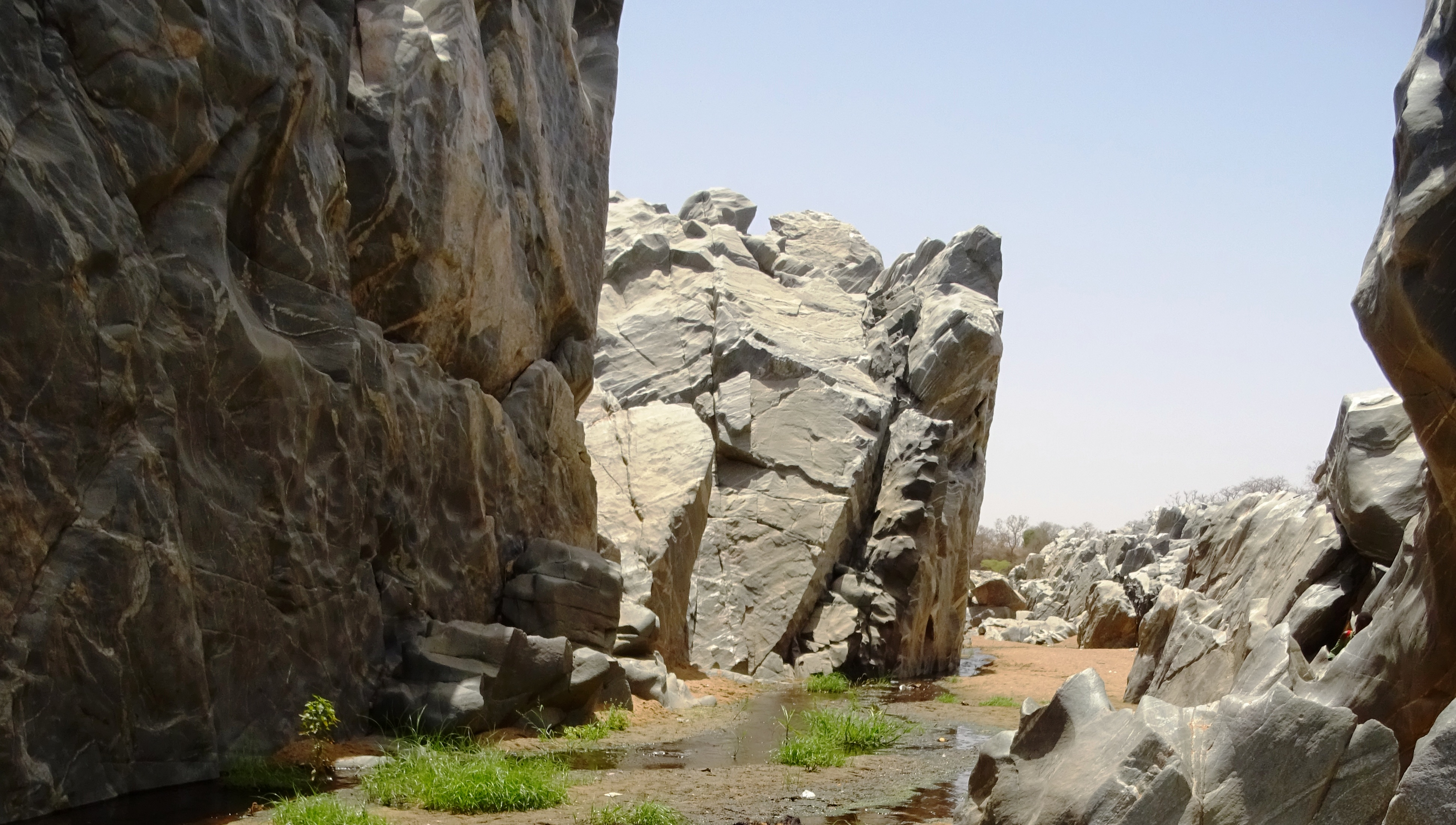
Kola Gorge in Guider during the dry season

- Figuil
- Guider
- Mayo-Oulo
