= Von Kossa stain =

Staining method used in cell biology to see calcium deposits

The von Kossa histological stain is used to quantify mineralization in cell culture and histological sections. It is named after the Hungarian physician Julius von Kóssa (a.k.a. Gyula Magyary-Kossa, 1865–1944), who developed it.

== Method ==
The von Kossa stain is a staining method to illustrates mineralization such as calcium and potassium in tissues. It is a precipitation reaction in which silver ions react with phosphate in the presence of acidic material. Photochemical degradation of silver phosphate to silver happens under light illumination.

Additional methods need to be employed to confirm the presence of calcium, such as Alizarin Red S.
