= Ndoukoula =

Coordinates: 10°16′N 14°02′E

- Commune and town
- Interactive map of Ndoukoula
- Country: Cameroon
- Time zone: UTC+1 (WAT)

Ndoukoula is a town and commune in Cameroon.

== See also ==
- Communes of Cameroon
