= Khoshya =

Khoshya (Hindi: खोश्या) is a gotra of Ahirs of Rajasthan and Haryana in India. According to historian Richard Gabriel Fox, Khoshya was dominant clan in Ahirwal whose ancestors occupied by force some Gujjar villages in Bharawas. One of the descendants of this clan, Chowdhari Deepchand was a sardar in the army of Emperor Alamgir II (1754–59).

Alternately it is also found as a surname in the Brahmin community of Kashmir, known as the Kashmiri Pandits.

== See also ==
- Ahir
- Haryana
- Ahir clans
