= Koza, Cameroon =

Commune in Far North Province, Cameroon

Koza
- Commune
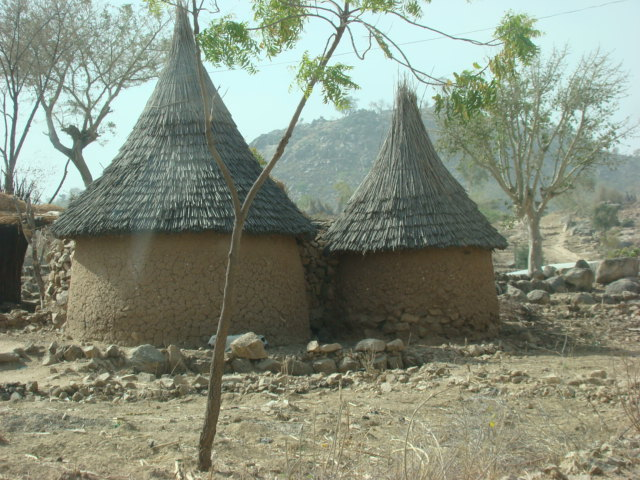
- Houses in Koza

- Location in Cameroon
- Coordinates: 10°51′55″N 13°52′39″E
- Country: Cameroon
- Province: Far North Province
- Division: Mayo-Tsanaga

Population (2005)
  - Total: 81,076

Koza is a commune in Mayo-Tsanaga Department, Cameroon. In 2005, the population was recorded at 81076.

== Villages ==
The following villages are located within the commune:

- Bigdé
- Djingliya
- Gabass
- Gaboua
- Gaivoukida
- Galdala
- Gouzda
- Guedjélé
- Hirché
- Houva
- Kilda
- Makandai
- Maltamaya
- Mawa
- Mbardam
- Modoko
- Morgoa
- Moulaï
- Moutchikar
- Mouzoua
- Ngjengué
- Oulad
- Tendéo
- Ziler
