= Kósa =

Kósa is a surname. Notable people with the surname include:

- Ádám Kósa (born 1975), Hungarian politician
- Ferenc Kósa (1937–2018), Hungarian filmmaker
- Gábor Kósa (born 1971), Hungarian historian
- György Kósa (1897–1984), Hungarian composer
- Lajos Kósa (born 1964), Hungarian politician
