= Kóša =

Kóša is a Slovak surname. Notable people with the surname include:

- František Kóša (born 2006), Slovak footballer
- Sebastian Kóša (born 2003), Slovak footballer
