= Mayo-Oulo =

Coordinates: 9°58′N 13°37′E

- Commune and town
- Interactive map of Mayo-Oulo
- Country: Cameroon
- Time zone: UTC+1 (WAT)

Mayo-Oulo is a town and commune in Cameroon.

== See also ==
- Communes of Cameroon
