= Kosa, Russia =

Kosa (Russian: Коса) is the name of several rural localities in Russia:

- Kosa, Kirov Oblast, a selo in Zuyevsky District of Kirov Oblast
- Kosa, Kosinsky District, Perm Krai, a selo in Kosinsky District of Komi-Permyak Okrug of Perm Krai
- Kosa, Ochyorsky District, Perm Krai, a village in Ochyorsky District of Perm Krai
- Kosa, Rostov Oblast, a khutor in Azovsky District of Rostov Oblast
