= Hina, Cameroon =

Town in the Far North District, Cameroon

Coordinates: 10.3659°N 13.8484°E

Hina Hina-Marbac
- Commune and town
- Interactive map of Hina
- Country: Cameroon
- Region: Far North Region
- Department: Mayo-Tsanaga
- Elevation: 2,300 ft (700 m)
- Time zone: UTC+1 (WAT)

Hina is a town, commune and political sub division in the Department of Mayo-Tsanaga in the Far North Region of Cameroon.

== Climate ==
Hina has a tropical savanna climate (Aw) with little to no rain from October to April and moderate to heavy rainfall from May to September.

Climate data for Hina
Month	Jan	Feb	Mar	Apr	May	Jun	Jul	Aug	Sep	Oct	Nov	Dec	Year
Mean daily maximum °C (°F)	32.5 (90.5)	34.3 (93.7)	37.1 (98.8)	37.8 (100.0)	35.2 (95.4)	32.4 (90.3)	30.1 (86.2)	28.7 (83.7)	30.1 (86.2)	33.2 (91.8)	34.4 (93.9)	32.7 (90.9)	33.2 (91.8)
Daily mean °C (°F)	24.5 (76.1)	26.4 (79.5)	29.3 (84.7)	30.4 (86.7)	28.6 (83.5)	26.6 (79.9)	25.0 (77.0)	24.2 (75.6)	24.9 (76.8)	26.3 (79.3)	26.5 (79.7)	24.6 (76.3)	26.4 (79.6)
Mean daily minimum °C (°F)	16.6 (61.9)	18.5 (65.3)	21.5 (70.7)	23.0 (73.4)	22.0 (71.6)	20.8 (69.4)	20.0 (68.0)	19.7 (67.5)	19.7 (67.5)	19.4 (66.9)	18.6 (65.5)	16.6 (61.9)	19.7 (67.5)
Average rainfall mm (inches)	0 (0)	0 (0)	3 (0.1)	25 (1.0)	89 (3.5)	127 (5.0)	202 (8.0)	259 (10.2)	154 (6.1)	39 (1.5)	1 (0.0)	0 (0)	899 (35.4)
Source: Climate-Data.org

== See also ==
- Communes of Cameroon
