= Bourrha =

Coordinates: 10°15′N 13°31′E

- Commune and town
- Interactive map of Bourrha
- Country: Cameroon
- Time zone: UTC+1 (WAT)

Bourrha is a town and commune in Cameroon.

== See also ==
- Communes of Cameroon
